= Great Recession in Russia =

The Great Recession in Russia was a crisis during 2008–2009 in the Russian financial markets as well as an economic recession that was compounded by political fears after the war with Georgia and by the plummeting price of Urals heavy crude oil, which lost more than 70% of its value since its record peak of US$147 on 4 July 2008 before rebounding moderately in 2009. According to the World Bank, Russia's strong short-term macroeconomic fundamentals made it better prepared than many emerging economies to deal with the crisis, but Russia's underlying structural weaknesses and high dependence on the price of a single commodity made the crisis' impact more pronounced than would otherwise be the case.

In late 2008 during the onset of the crisis, Russian markets plummeted and more than $1 trillion had been wiped off the value of Russia's shares, although Russian stocks rebounded in 2009 becoming the world's best performers, with the MICEX Index having more than doubled in value and regaining half its 2008 losses.

As the crisis progressed, Reuters and the Financial Times speculated that the crisis would be used to increase the Kremlin's control over key strategic assets in a reverse of the "loans for shares" sales of the 1990s, when the state sold off major assets to the oligarchs in return for loans. In contrast to this earlier speculation, in September 2009 the Russian government announced plans to sell state energy and transport holdings in order to help plug the budget deficit and to help improve the nation's aging infrastructure. The state earmarked about 5,500 enterprises for divestment and planned to sell shares in companies that were already publicly traded, including Rosneft, the country's biggest oil producer.

From July 2008 – January 2009, Russia's foreign exchange reserves (FXR) fell by $210 billion from their peak to $386 billion as the central bank adopted a policy of gradual devaluation to combat the sharp devaluation of the ruble. The ruble weakened 35% against the dollar from the onset of the crisis in August to January 2009. As the ruble stabilized in January the reserves began to steadily grow again throughout 2009, reaching a year-long high of $452 billion by year's-end.

Russia's economy emerged from recession in the third quarter of 2009 after two-quarters of record negative growth. GDP contracted by 7.9% for the whole of 2009. Experts expected that Russia's economy would grow modestly in 2010, with estimates ranging from 3.1% by the Russian economic ministry to 2.5%, 3.6% and 4.9% by the World Bank, International Monetary Fund (IMF), and Organisation for Economic Co-operation and Development (OECD) respectively.

== Background ==
The rainy-day Stabilization Fund was used to buffer the national budget, which is strongly tied to the price of crude oil

Russia is a major exporter of commodities such as oil and metals, so its economy had been hit hard by the decline in the price of many commodities. The Russian stock market declined significantly. Foreign investors had pulled billions of dollars out of Russia on concerns over escalating geopolitical tensions with the West following the military conflict between Georgia and Russia, as well as concerns about state interference in the economy. Those concerns were underscored in July by Prime Minister Vladimir Putin's criticism of steel company Mechel collapsing the company's stock. By September 2008, the RTS stock index plunged almost 54%, making it one of the worst performing markets in the world. Russian involvement in the US subprime mortgage crisis contributed to the volatility in Russia's financial system. The Russian Central Bank owned US$100 Billion of mortgage-backed securities of the two American mortgage giants Fannie Mae and Freddie Mac that were taken over by the US government. This investment appeared to be bound for write-off.

Many analysts, including Andrei Illarionov, former economic policy adviser to then-President Vladimir Putin, claim that in Russia the crisis in the stock market was deepened dramatically by internal factors, including concerns over state interference in the economy fueled in June by Putin's criticism of Mechel and the conflict over TNK-BP, lack of transparency in banking and political risks associated with escalating geopolitical tensions following the 2008 South Ossetia war in August. Swedish Foreign minister Carl Bildt said on 17 September that the current Russian financial crisis is "obviously more worrying" than the ongoing subprime mortgage crisis in view of the political development in Russia. Furthermore, Russia's overt reliance on the oil and natural gas sector made it particularly vulnerable.

According to the Wall Street Journal and Gazeta.ru, as the Russian market declined in September, a conspiracy theory circulated within Russian leadership that the U.S. government had incited American investors to withdraw their capital from Russia, in punishment for the war in Georgia.

== Financial markets ==
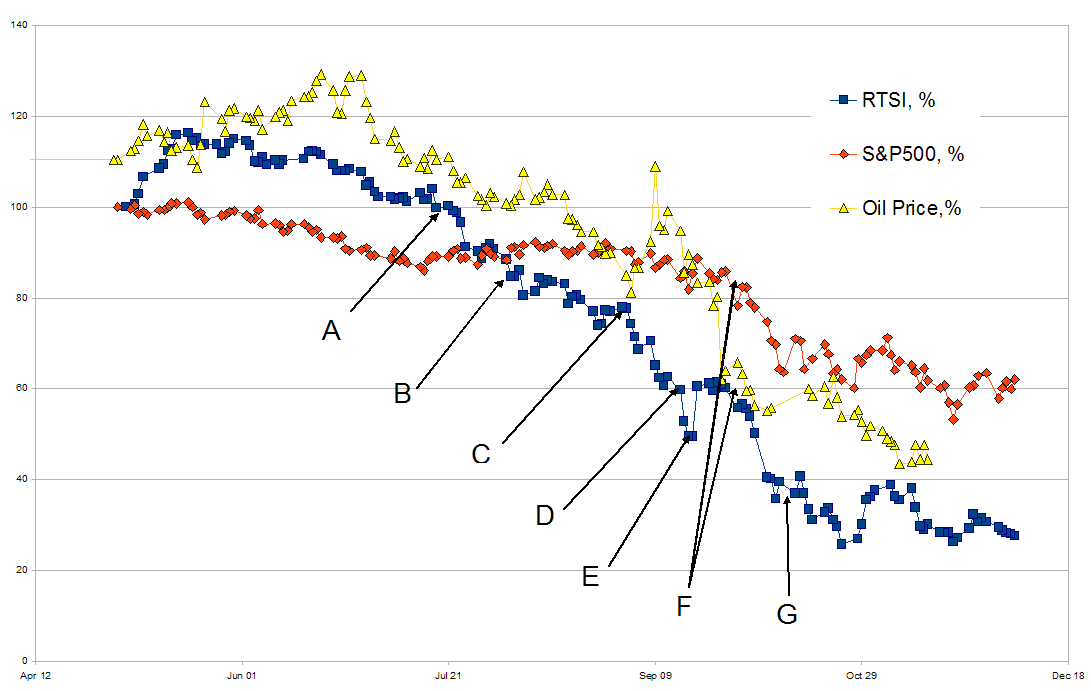
Major Russian stock market RTS Index with S&P 500 and Oil Spot Prices. All data are in percentages to 1 May 2008 values. A – Vladimir Putin criticises Mechel; B – 2008 South Ossetia war starts; C – Recognition of Abkhazia and South Ossetia by Russia; D – Alexei Kudrin "no systematic crisis" speech; E – measures to save major banks are adopted by the Russian government; F – 2008 financial crisis; G – President Dmitri Medvedev announced additional bailout financing

=== Stock markets ===
On 24 July 2008, Mechel's stock plunged by almost 38 percent after Russia's Prime Minister Vladimir Putin criticized its CEO Igor Zyuzin, and accused the company of selling resources to Russia at higher prices than those charged to foreign countries. The comments, which raised fears of another attack similar to that made on Yukos in 2004, contrasted sharply with previous efforts by President Dmitry Medvedev to improve Russia's reputation as an investor-friendly country. On the following day, Mechel issued a contrite statement promising full cooperation with federal authorities, while share values rebounded by nearly 15 percent. 28 July presidential aide Arkady Dvorkovich then sought to restore calm, declaring that all parties would "act in a civilized way", and confirming that Mechel was cooperating with antitrust authorities. Just hours later, however, Putin announced that Mechel had been avoiding taxes, by using foreign subsidiaries to sell its products internationally. His renewed attack caused share prices to tumble once more—this time by almost 33 percent.

On 16 September Russia's most liquid stock exchange MICEX and the dollar-denominated RTS were suspended trade for one hour after the worst one-day fall in 10 years as Finance Minister Alexei Kudrin reassured markets there was no "systemic" crisis. Next day, trading was suspended for the second day in succession on Russia's two main stock exchanges (MICEX and RTS) after shares fell dramatically, forcing the Federal Financial Markets Service to intervene. The simultaneous collapse of money markets prompted reaction from the government and the Central Bank, while Finance Minister Alexey Kudrin sought assurances from U.S. Treasury Secretary Henry Paulson that the U.S. did not play politics with Russia in the crisis.

The crisis continued on 18 September, as trading was suspended for the third day in succession on Russia's two main stock exchanges amidst fear of financial collapse. News agencies are quoting Russia's finance minister Alexei Kudrin as saying trading on Russian exchanges will not resume until 19 September 2008. Officials at MICEX stock exchange describe conditions in the Russian markets as "extraordinary" Deputy Finance Minister Pyotr Kazakevich asserted that "Russia is facing its worst stock market decline in a decade mainly because of a confidence crisis rather than liquidity problems".

On 6 October the MICEX and RTS crashed by 18.6% and 19.1% respectively. The losses forced the Federal Financial Markets Service to suspend the stocks three times. Trading on both exchanges was suspended on the next day; Russian companies have augmented in price at London LSE. On 8 October the MICEX and RTS plunged 14.4% and 11.3% respectively, trading on the markets was halted until 10 October, respectively. However, on 9 October MICEX trading resumed ahead of schedule, and the stock market rose 14.7%. On the next day the regulator, wary of crises in American and Asian markets, decided not to open trading at all.

=== Money markets ===
The crisis in money markets was imminent since spring, when Central Bank of Russia warned the public of a gradual contraction in bank lending due to unfolding world liquidity crisis. However, the regulator preferred to combat inflation, raising the refinancing rate and bank reserve contributions. 1 September hike in reserve rate alone withdrew nearly 100 billion roubles from the money market. The raise coincided with a seasonal peak in tax payments and left the banking system in a worse state of liquidity than that of August 1998. A subsequent drop in rouble-to-dollar exchange rate and dollar-denominated prices of Russian corporate securities forced investors to crowd out, worsening the positive feedback loop. The interbank money market that traditionally relied on Russian corporate stock as a collateral for the repurchase agreements, immediately imploded in what was called "a crisis of trust" or even "elimination of trust": when the borrowers defaulted on loans, leaving lenders with impaired collateral, other banks stopped lending as a precaution.

Money market crunch passed its first lowest mark 15–17 September. 17 September the government lent the country's three biggest banks, Sberbank, VTB Bank and Gazprombank, 1.13 trillion rubles (US$44 billion) for at least three months to boost liquidity; the Central Bank lowered the reserve requirement. This was followed 24 September by Central Bank loans to keep the current accounts afloat and prevent a bank run. The regulators also raised the cap for deposit insurance from 400 to 700 thousand roubles (equivalent to 25 thousand dollars). These actions served their short-term purpose but failed to revitalize the money market: no bank was willing to lend for longer than overnight.

17 November MosPrime interbank interest rate on rouble loans reached a record high of 22.67%, indicating another shortage of liquid funds as the bank clients transferred funds overseas or paid taxes due. Rates on six-month US dollar forward contracts fluctuated at 40–60%, short-term currency swaps averaged around 80% as the banks anticipated further drop in exchange rates.

=== Bank failures ===
On 15 September the KIT Finance brokerage failed to pay off its debt, signalling problems in Russia's financial sector. On 8 October the Russian Railways and Alrosa agreed to acquire a 90% stake in KIT Finance.

In the beginning of October Sergei Ignatyev, chairman of the Central Bank, announced imminent bankruptcy of 50 to 70 banks. Actually, in late August – late November the regulator has shut down only nine banks. More smaller banks showing signs of distress are allowed to operate, like the Moscow Mortgage Bank that defaulted on returning individual deposits in November. Regional banks, heavily dependent on individual deposits, were in particular hit. A bank run registered in Bashkortostan in November caused local crises. Three of the four worst affected banks were promised rescue by their shareholders or third-party buyers; fate of the fourth one is yet to be decided.

== Government intervention ==
=== Refinancing foreign capital ===
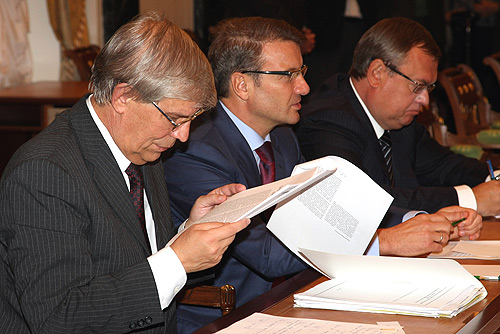
Sergei Ignatyev (Chairman of the Central Bank of Russia), German Gref (Chairman and CEO of Sberbank) and Andrey Kostin (Chairman and CEO of Vneshtorgbank) at a meeting convened by President of Russia Dmitry Medvedev dealing with economic issues in Russia on 18 September 2008

On 18 September, Russian President Dmitry Medvedev ordered ministers to inject 500 billion roubles of funds from the state budget into the markets and pledged that the financial system would receive "all necessary support". On 7 October, Medvedev announced an additional $36 billion for banks on top of the $150 billion approved in September.

On 29 September, Vladimir Putin announced a government policy aimed at refinancing Russian corporations that previously relied on foreign loans. Government authorized Vnesheconombank as its principal agent in distributing state loans to these corporations, amounting initially up to 50 billion US dollars, or 8% of Russia's foreign currency assets. At the same time Putin recommended the Central Bank to extend unsecured stabilization loans to Russian banks, which was duly implemented. The policy was immediately dubbed "soft re-nationalisation" and criticized for selective picking of "eligible" borrowers. The 50 billion installment covers only the current portion of 477 billion US dollars owed by Russian corporations to foreign lenders; total assets of the government and the Central Bank combined are estimated at 550 billion US dollars.

On 23 October, Standard & Poor's changed the long-term outlook on the sovereign credit ratings of Russia from stable to negative, warning of the costs of bailing out troubled banks and a rising risk of a budget deficit in 2009. It also lowered Russia's Transfer and Convertibility (T&C) assessment to BBB+ from A−. At the same time, the 'BBB+' long-term foreign currency, the 'A−' long-term local currency ratings and the short-term ratings of A-2 were affirmed.

By 13 November, Russian government spending to quench the recession reached 222 billion US dollars, or 13.9% of its GDP; in November the state was spending its reserves at an average 22 billion dollars a week.

On 8 December 2008, Standard & Poor's additionally lowered Russia's foreign currency credit ratings to BBB (long term) and A-3. It also lowered Russia's Transfer and Convertibility (T&C) assessment to BBB and the long-term local currency assessment to BBB+. On the other hand, the short-term credit rating in local currency was left intact as A-2. The lowering of credit ratings was caused by the sharp decline of reserves and investment flow. Standard & Poor's also launched a downward revision of Russian municipal and corporate bond ratings.

=== Tax and state budget policy ===
20 November Vladimir Putin announced government package of tax reforms. Corporate profit tax rate (24% in 2008) is to be reduced to 20%. Profit tax base will decrease for companies investing in capital assets as the immediately recoverable depreciation allowance is raised from 10% to 30% of the asset cost. There will be no change in value added tax rates (maximum 18%) in 2009, but the government considered changing VAT accrual rules in favor of the taxpayers. Minister of finance Alexey Kudrin, who resisted tax breaks until September, concurred with Putin's proposal, estimating that they will save the businesses around 500 billion roubles annually.

Earlier in November, Kudrin announced that the state has accepted the fact of a long-term drop in oil prices and that the existing state budget plans will hold unchanged if the oil prices stabilize on 50 dollars per barrel mark. Even with tax breaks effective, Kudrin estimated that the 2009 state budget will break even or, in worst case, bear no more than 1% deficit. The deficit will be covered by Stabilisation Fund, without resorting to borrowing.

In December the government lifted import tariffs on industrial equipment imported by metallurgy, construction, forestry and textile industry, at the same time enforcing increased tariffs on imported cars.

=== Corporate governance ===
Federal Financial Monitoring Service of Russia, the agency in charge of domestic stock markets and corporate governance, pressed the corporations to reveal their true owners and signed an agreement with the government of Cyprus (20 November) that may enable inter-government disclosure of ownership records. Cyprus is, nominally, the number one investor in Russia; 99% of RTS stock trades are arranged between foreign shareholders.

=== International cooperation ===
Russia has agreed to co-finance International Monetary Fund emergency loans to other states, initially contributing one billion US dollar. Earlier, in October, Russian ambassador to Iceland announces that Iceland will receive a €4 billion loan from Russia to mitigate the 2008–2011 Icelandic financial crisis. The loan will be given across three or four years, and the interest rates will be 30 to 50 points above LIBOR. Prime minister Geir Haarde had been investigating the possibility of a loan provided by Russia since the mid-summer. Iceland's Central bank Governor Davíð Oddsson later clarified that the loan was still being negotiated.

== Russian economic crisis ==
At the end of November 2008, The Russian economy as a whole was not in a state of recession. The government forecast for 2009 stood at a 6.7% annual growth rate while a November 2008 World Bank report projected 3% growth for 2009, However, a revised projection issued 30 March 2009 by the World Bank projects a 4.5% decrease for 2009 with unemployment projected to rise to 12% by the end of 2009. The World Bank report expressed concern about the condition of the poor and recommended increases in social support payments such as unemployment payments and child support payments. The report projected a slight rise in the average price of oil during 2010, up to $53 a barrel from the projected average of $45 for 2009.

In the middle of December 2008 Russian officials confirmed that possibility of a recession was inevitable. "Russia is headed for a recession", the country's deputy economy minister, Andrei Klepach, has said. Asked whether Russia would have a recession, he said: "It's started already. I'm afraid it will not be over in the next two-quarters. ... A major drop began in October and there will also be drops in November–December," he said, according to official reports. Recessions are normally declared after two-quarters of negative growth. He also said that full-year economic growth for 2008 would be lower than the 6.8% previously forecast.

=== Steel industry ===
Russian steel industry is dependent on foreign markets and domestic construction and automobile industries. Crisis in the industry was first publicly reported in the end of September – early October. Magnitogorsk Iron and Steel Works laid off 3,000 workers (10% of its Urals staff) and reduced output by 15% on 7 October, another layoff of 1,300 was announced in early November. Severstal reduced domestic production by 25%; its US and Italian production dropped by 30%. Evraz Group, employer of 40 thousands workers in Kemerovo Oblast, was reported negotiating layoffs with the unions and regional government since 30 October. The company, specializing in construction-grade rolled steel, was inherently in worse position than other Russian steel mills. 13 November Evraz announced that, instead of layoffs, it will decrease workers' wages by a third. Some of Evraz facilities were converted to a four-day working week; the company reduced output to an estimated 50–60% of its capacity.

On 18 November Goskomstat insider reported an unprecedented drop in industrial prices – minus 6.6% monthly, following a 0.8% drop in September (the agency itself delayed its regular monthly report). Most of the losses concentrate in raw material industries; automobile and tool-making industries dropped only 0.4%. In two months, gasoline and diesel oil wholesale prices dropped by 12.8% and 16.5%. The worst price fall hit the steel industry: pig iron and ferric alloys dropped 21.7% in October after an 8.9% drop in September. Prices on aluminum and nickel are down to break-even point. The decline is sufficient to indicate a recession.

In November the industry relied on government funds distributed through loans from VTB Bank. VTB issued a 10 billion roubles emergency loan to Evraz to finance its current tax payments; a similar 5 billion loan was issued to OAO TMK. Magnitka was reported "in the line" for VTB financing. The industry continued to implode, and on 14 and 18 November Novolipetsk Steel shut down two of its five blast furnaces, reducing its pig iron capacity by 2.5 million metric tons, or 27%. On the same day Novolipetsk Steel denied steel shipments to GAZ due to automobile maker's default on payments.

=== Automotive industry ===
In June 2008 The Economist described "Russia's booming car market" as a place where "you just need someone to count the money". In November the market slowed to its lowest since January 2007. AC Nielsen linked the market drop to a collapse in auto loan programs and general uncertainty among consumers, and predicted that unless auto loans recover, the market will slide back into the 1990s. The government supported domestic auto makers by an increase in tariffs on imports, leading to an expected 7.5–8% price increase for imported cars.

GAZ and KAMAZ were the first auto makers to declare production cuts in September–October 2008. GAZ truck production has decreased by 23.4% in September 2008; in October the company announced week-long shutdowns of the main assembly line to meet decrease in demand for its most successful line, the GAZelle truck. KAMAZ, the target of acquisition by Daimler AG since July, has been reporting financial difficulties since September. In October KAMAZ reduced working hours by a third, from six-day to four-day working week. KAMAZ requested a 15 billion rouble state-backed loan and took a private loan from Citigroup at 9% over prime rate; in December Daimler AG acquired the first 10% in KAMAZ stock, citing "perfect storm" as a good time acquisition.

AvtoVAZ disclosed emergency measures on 16 October, when Igor Sechin held an industry-wide anti-crisis brainstorming session in Togliatti. AvtoVAZ reported a stockpile of 100 thousands unsold cars (two months' output). The company requested government assistance of 1 billion US Dollars arranged through a VTB loan. Unlike other major borrowers who used VTB loans to substitute foreign capital, AvtoVAZ loan was intended solely to pay current expenses.

AvtoFramos, Moscow-based manufacturer of Renault Logan, has confirmed that instead of a planned weekly New Year holiday, the plant will stop for a month, 12 December 2008 to 12 January 2009. Trade unions asserted that AvroFramos has practiced short-time stoppages in November; plant administration refuted these statements. According to the unions, unsold stock reached 8 thousand cars, a month's output of the plant.

Amtel-Vredestein has closed two of its tire plants due to cash flow problems. On 2 December media announced closure of Bor Glass Works, the principal supplier of auto glass, but the news was soon refuted as false by the plant administration.

=== Construction and real estate ===
In the first half of 2008 Russian construction industry, apparently immune of the global financial squeeze, grew by 22% in nominal money compared to 2007. In September–October Mirax Group, Sistema Hals, ST Group and other real estate developers announced freezing of future projects and intention to dispose of ongoing projects in early stages, citing an unacceptable increase in interest rates and uncertain demand. According to a Mirax executive, "our clients are panicking, and that is affecting our business", "... bank financing for developers has practically ceased". Developers and builders of a lesser scale are facing a "struggle to survive", especially in regional cities. In October 2008 Orenburg construction executive described regional business prospects as "very bad", notably the fact that "there is no single bank for today which grants mortgage loans... Construction industry will not survive under such terms."

27 October Vladimir Putin urged the government agencies to increase state purchases of road and housing construction services, arguing that the state must capitalize on the decrease in prices of raw materials. The state allocated 50 billion roubles to buy ready-to-occupy urban housing from cash-strapped developers. Putin emphasized that the new contracts must be struck on new, decreased, price terms – estimated to be 20–30% cheaper than in spring. Strabag executive estimated that in 2009 construction costs will decrease a further 30%. In November Moscow city government has been successfully pressing local developers for a 25% discount against October auction prices; the only developer who attempted to sue the city for a breach of contract withdrew their lawsuit and accepted the government terms. City government also pulled out of the 118-floor Russia Tower project, which was immediately suspended by its developer, citing "credit crunch".

=== Other industries ===
In November, the volume of Russian paper exports to China decreased by 30–40%, coupled with a 30% drop in prices. Exports to Western Europe fare marginally better, with an estimated 25–40% drop in production volumes. Russia's largest producer of industrial paper bags, Segezh Paper Mill (controlled by the Bank of Moscow and the City of Moscow), declared a ten-day shutdown on 24 November. UPM-Kymmene Oyj anticipates at least a 30–40% decrease in output compared to 2008. In June 2010, President Dmitry Medvedev visited Silicon Valley in San Jose, California in order to cultivate ideas of how to develop Russia as a major research center. Skolkovo, a mid-sized city near Moscow, is the proposed location for this Russian Silicon Valley, and will have its own tax structure. Yet, Medvedev has been criticized by opposition politicians for deflecting attention away from the struggling economy and corruption.

=== Airlines ===
In June–August 2008 the fleet of KrasAir, a Krasnoyarsk-based airline with a controlling state interest, was grounded by the fuel suppliers' refusal to extend credit to the company that defaulted on payments. Other members of AiRUnion consortium, notably Dalavia, also folded in August. Thousands of passengers were stranded in airports; flight delays and cancellations became a national agenda. Government action focused on setting the cap on jet fuel prices and restructuring its assets into a new company managed by Rostechnologii, a newly formed state conglomerate. Ministry of Transportation distributed the licenses to fly former KrasAir routes to other companies. KrasAir also defaulted on payments to its staff, and on 27 October a strike action, coupled with fuel suppliers' denial of service, finally ruined the airline. Dalavia lost its license earlier in October. The collapse of KrasAir also threatened Sky Express, Russia's first low cost carrier co-owned by the EBRD and former manager of KrasAir. 22 October the assets of bankrupt KrasAir, Domodedovo Airlines, Samara Airlines and Atlant-Soyuz Airlines were consolidated in a new company, Rosavia, co-financed by the City of Moscow and Rostekhnologii. Rossiya, Orenair, Kavminvodyavia, Vladivostok Air, Dalavia and Saravia were originally planned to join this proposed airline holding company, too, which would have made Rosavia the largest Russian airline by fleet size. Following a 20 percent drop of domestic passenger numbers in Russia per month, the federal government scrapped all plans concerning the new airline on 5 March 2009.

=== Agriculture, food industry and retail ===
Russia had a high grain harvest in 2008, but so it was elsewhere in the world, bringing the prices down. To support the trade, Dmitry Medvedev authorized a state export subsidy of 40 US dollars per metric ton. This, according to the minister of agriculture, is sufficient to maintain exports at 20–25 million metric tons. The food industry is, however, locked between high costs of farm produce and tight price and credit terms dictated by retail chains. Food industry executives anticipate that the chains will eventually lose part of their clients to street markets, as the suppliers are forced to develop this independent sales channel.

Domestic retail chains, heavily leveraged, were experiencing liquidity crisis at least since April 2008. The first chain to go bankrupt in May 2008, Grossmart (190 stores in Moscow region), had a particularly high debt-to-EBITDA ratio of 6 to 1. Arbat Prestige, subject to government attacks since 2007, defaulted on its bonds in June. In November 2008 nine leading food retail chains (out of nearly 300) received access to government-backed financing. Nevertheless, retailers are pressing food suppliers for longer credit terms or bigger cash discounts, demanding up to 50% price cut for cash payment. Suppliers, in a mirror move, raised "regular" credit prices by 20–60%. Rather than submit to the chains' demands, they simply refuse to sell; visible depletion of stocks has affected only a few affected chains.

== Social impact ==
=== Unemployment ===
A proprietary Ernst & Young survey of 113 clients that leaked into Russian press in November summarized their losses at 8% of managerial and 6% of low-level jobs by end of October. All companies in the survey practiced some sort of reducing labor costs. One company in four practiced unpaid "vacations"; 8% of clients settled for reduced working hours. Federal Migratory Service announced in November that 1123 Russian companies reported upcoming layoffs of 45 thousand.

Most layoffs were reported in metallurgy and financial services: 20% in Uralsib, 1000 in Vneshtorgbank's VTB24 retail division. 1 December Vedomosti reported upcoming 40% cuts in MDM Bank and 80% in IFD Kapital. Sberbank endorsed a long-term program to reduce headcount by 25% in 2014. In telecommunications, Sitronics laid off up to 10% in all business units; in audit services, Deloitte Touche Tohmatsu reduced number of partners in its Russian division by 17 out of 180. Vedomosti has set up a private "layoff newsreel" syndicating independent reports of job cuts, yet as at 7 December 2008, there are no reliable nationwide statistics on white-collar unemployment, which usually escapes official unemployment record.

By late November, Kremlin First Deputy Chief of Staff, Vladislav Surkov, was warning that the middle classes should be defended from poverty during the crisis. He called for swift measures to protect the middle class from layoffs and to support consumption. "If the 1980s were the times of the intellectuals and the 1990s were the times of the oligarchs then the 00s can be seen as the epoch of the middle classes,' Surkov said in a speech published on the Web site of the ruling United Russia party ... The main task of the state during the slump must become the preservation of the middle class, the defence of the middle class from the waves of poverty and confusion that are coming from the West," he said.

According to official statements released 9 December, rate of unemployment growth peaked in the middle of November and slowed down in subsequent weeks. In the week ending 3 December overall unemployment grew by 1.6% to 1.315 million people, following a 2.3% increase in the preceding week. The state also reported an increase in unpaid vacations and reduced working week employees to 149.3 thousands. The number increased by 84% in a single week ending 3 December. The trade unions anticipate that official unemployment will peak at around 2 million people in 2009, when hidden forms of unemployment become visible to statisticians. Yet on 12 December Putin announced completely different unemployment numbers – 4.6 million in October.

In February 2009 the unemployment rate peaked at a seven-year high of 9.4%, then began to steadily decline, falling to 7.7% as of October.

=== Consumer price inflation ===
Official consumer price inflation in January–August 2008 reached 14.8%. By the end of November, food price inflation for an 11-month period reached 15.3%. Overall price inflation, taking into account consumer and industrial prices, reached 12.5% compared to 10.6% for the same period of 2007. Decline in short-term inflation was credited to a reduction in monetary supply. Inflation slowed through 2009 with a year on year rate of 9.1% as of November, down from 13.8% a year earlier.

== See also ==
- 1998 Russian financial crisis
- 2008 financial crisis
- Great Recession
- 2008 Latvian financial crisis
- 2000s commodities boom
- Russian financial crisis (2014–2016)
