= Economic history of the Russian Federation =

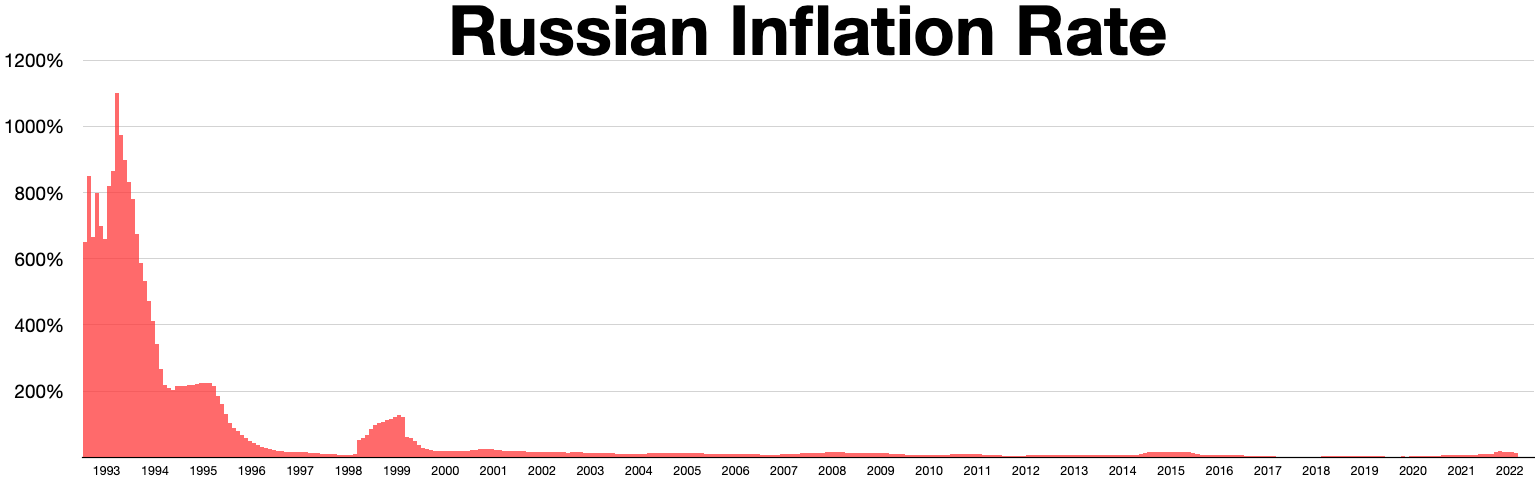
Russian inflation rate 1993-2022

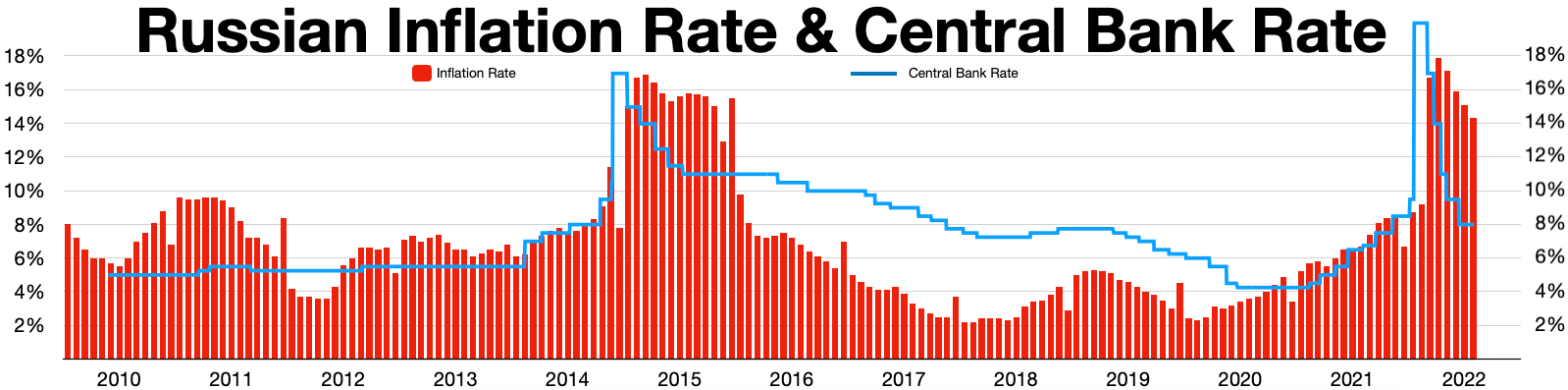
Russian inflation rate 2010-2022 Central Bank of Russia key interest rate

After the dissolution of the Soviet Union in 1991 and the end of its centrally-planned economy, the Russian Federation succeeded it under president Boris Yeltsin. The Russian government used policies of shock therapy to liberalize the economy as part of the transition to a market economy, causing a sustained economic recession. GDP per capita levels returned to their 1991 levels by the mid-2000s. The economy of Russia is much more stable today than in the early 1990s, but inflation still remains an issue. Historically and currently, the Russian economy has differed sharply from major developed economies because of its weak legal system, underdevelopment of modern economic activities, technological backwardness, and lower living standards.

Russia began its transition to a market economy in January 1992. It was formally recognized as such by the European Union in May 2002 and by the United States in June 2002.

== Historical background ==
=== Economic history of the Russian Empire ===
Russian national income per capita increased and moved to closer to the most developed economies of Northern and Western Europe from the late 17th century to the 1740s. After the 1740s, the Russian economy stagnated and declined. In the 18th century, Russian national income per capita was about 40–70% of British per capita income but higher than Poland's. By 1860, Russian GDP per capita was similar to that of Japan; one-third of GDP per capita in the United States or the United Kingdom; and twice that of China or India. Russia was a late industrializer.

Serfdom, which held back development of the wage labor market and created a shortage of labor for industry, was abolished in 1861. In the aftermath, GDP per capita was volatile and did not substantially increase. Steady economic growth began in the 1890s, alongside a structural transformation of the Russian economy. By the time World War I started, more than half the Russian economy was still devoted to agriculture. By the early 20th century, the Russian economy had fallen further behind the American and British economies. From the late 19th century to the early 20th century, the economy grew at a similar pace as the Japanese economy and faster than the Brazilian, Indian and Chinese economies.

Despite all this Russian Empire from the beginning of the reign of Nicholas II, it began to change dramatically in economic terms. It was the fastest growing economy in the world, the average GDP growth was higher than the Western European one, and the volume of production per capita was equal to it. The standard of living also grew high.

=== Economic history of the Soviet Union ===
For about 69 years, the Russian economy and that of the rest of the Soviet Union operated on the basis of a centrally planned economy, with a state control over virtually all means of production and over investment, production, and consumption decisions throughout the economy. Economic policy was made according to directives from the Communist Party, which controlled all aspects of economic activity. Since the collapse of Communism in the early 1990s, Russia has experienced difficulties in making the transition from a centrally planned economy to a market based economy.

Much of the structure of the Soviet economy that operated until 1987 originated under the leadership of Joseph Stalin, with only incidental modifications made between 1953 and 1987. Five-year plan and annual plans were the chief mechanisms the Soviet government used to translate economic policies into programs. According to those policies, the State Planning Committee (Gosudarstvennyy planovyy komitet—Gosplan) formulated countrywide output targets for stipulated planning periods. Regional planning bodies then refined these targets for economic units such as state industrial enterprises and state farms (sovkhozy; sing., sovkhoz) and collective farms (kolkhozy; sing., kolkhoz), each of which had its own specific output plan. Central planning operated on the assumption that if each unit met or exceeded its plan, then demand and supply would balance.

The government's role was to ensure that the plans were fulfilled. Responsibility for production flowed from the top down. At the national level, some seventy government ministries and state committees, each responsible for a production sector or subsector, supervised the economic production activities of units within their areas of responsibility. Regional ministerial bodies reported to the national-level ministries and controlled economic units in their respective geographical areas. The plans incorporated output targets for raw materials and intermediate goods as well as final goods and services. In theory, but not in practice, the central planning system ensured a balance among the sectors throughout the economy. Under central planning, the state performed the allocation functions that prices perform in a market system. In the Soviet economy, prices were an accounting mechanism only. The government established prices for all goods and services based on the role of the product in the plan and on other noneconomic criteria. This pricing system produced anomalies. For example, the price of bread, a traditional staple of the Russian diet, was below the cost of the wheat used to produce it. In some cases, farmers fed their livestock bread rather than grain because bread cost less. In another example, rental fees for apartments were set very low to achieve social equity, yet housing was in extremely short supply. Soviet industries obtained raw materials such as oil, natural gas, and coal at prices below world market levels, encouraging waste.

The central planning system allowed Soviet leaders to marshal resources quickly in times of crisis, such as the Nazi invasion, and to reindustrialize the country during the postwar period. The rapid development of its defence and industrial base after the war permitted the Soviet Union to become a superpower.

The attempts and failures of reformers during the era of perestroika (restructuring) in the regime of Mikhail Gorbachev (1985–91) attested to the complexity of the challenge.

== Transition to market economy ==
After 1991, under the leadership of Boris Yeltsin, the country made a significant turn toward developing a market economy by implanting basic tenets such as market-determined prices. Two fundamental and interdependent goals — macroeconomic stabilization and economic restructuring — the transition from central planning to a market-based economy. The former entailed implementing fiscal and monetary policies that promote economic growth in an environment of stable prices and exchange rates. The latter required establishing the commercial, and institutional entities — banks, private property, and commercial legal codes— that permit the economy to operate efficiently. Opening domestic markets to foreign trade and investment, thus linking the economy with the rest of the world, was an important aid in reaching these goals. The Gorbachev regime failed to address these fundamental goals. At the time of the Soviet Union's demise, the Yeltsin government of the Russian Republic had begun to attack the problems of macroeconomic stabilization and economic restructuring. By mid-1996, the results were mixed.

Since collapse of the Soviet Union in 1991, Russia has tried to develop a market economy and achieve consistent economic growth. In October 1991, Yeltsin announced that Russia would proceed with radical, market-oriented reform along the lines of "shock therapy", as recommended by the United States and IMF. Hyperinflation resulted from the removal of Soviet price controls and the central bank's policy in the early 1990s. Jeffrey Sachs, an economist who advised the Russian government on the reforms, said that the shock therapy reforms failed in Russia (after having succeeded in Poland two years before) due to loose monetary policy by the central bank and the lack of financial support of the transition by the West. He explains the latter by the US government viewing Poland as an ally and Russia as an antagonist.

Assuming the role as the continuing legal personality of the Soviet Union, Russia took up the responsibility for settling the USSR's external debts.

Russia experienced hyperinflation between 1992 and 1995. Prices increased by 300% in January 1992, and by as much as 1,000% in the first three months. The inflation rate was 2,509% for the year 1992, 840% for 1993, 215% for 1994, and 131% for 1995. The Russian GDP contracted an estimated 40% between 1991 and 1998, despite the country's wealth of natural resources, its well-educated population, and its diverse – although increasingly dilapidated – industrial base. Some economists said that this figure may be misleading, since much of the Soviet Union's GDP was military spending and the production of goods for which there was little demand. The discontinuation of much of that wasteful spending created the false impression of larger than actual economic contraction.

Critical elements such as privatization of state enterprises and extensive foreign investment were rushed into place in the first few years of the post-Soviet period. But other fundamental parts of the economic infrastructure, such as commercial banking and authoritative, comprehensive commercial laws, were absent or only partly in place by 1996. Although by the mid-1990s a return to Soviet-era central planning seemed unlikely, the configuration of the post-transition economy remained unpredictable.

On November 7, 1990, an open letter to Mikhail Gorbachev was published and signed by a rank of thirty Western sources, most of whom were academics. The contents of the letter made the argument to the Soviet head of state that while moving the Economy of the Soviet Union away from a centrally planned system towards a free market mixed economy was a step forward, they warned the leader against following through with what the West had done following the end of feudalism; privatising the land itself, instead opting towards a Georgist system of common ownership and the collection of public revenue through land value taxation. Nobel prize-winners Franco Modigliani, James Tobin, Robert Solow and William Vickrey were among the letter's signees. Today, Russia imposes a degree of land-value taxation. British economist Fred Harrison worked closely with Russia's State Duma in regards to tax reform during the 1990s. However, land value taxation in these countries is not nearly as high as the letter recommended.

=== Monetary and fiscal policies ===
In January 1992, the government clamped down on money and credit creation at the same time that it lifted price controls. However, beginning in February, the Central Bank, headed by Viktor Gerashchenko, loosened the reins on the money supply. In the second and third quarters of 1992, the money supply had increased at especially sharp rates of 34% and 30%, respectively. By the end of 1992, the Russian money supply had increased by eighteen times. This led directly to high inflation and to a deterioration in the exchange rate of the ruble.

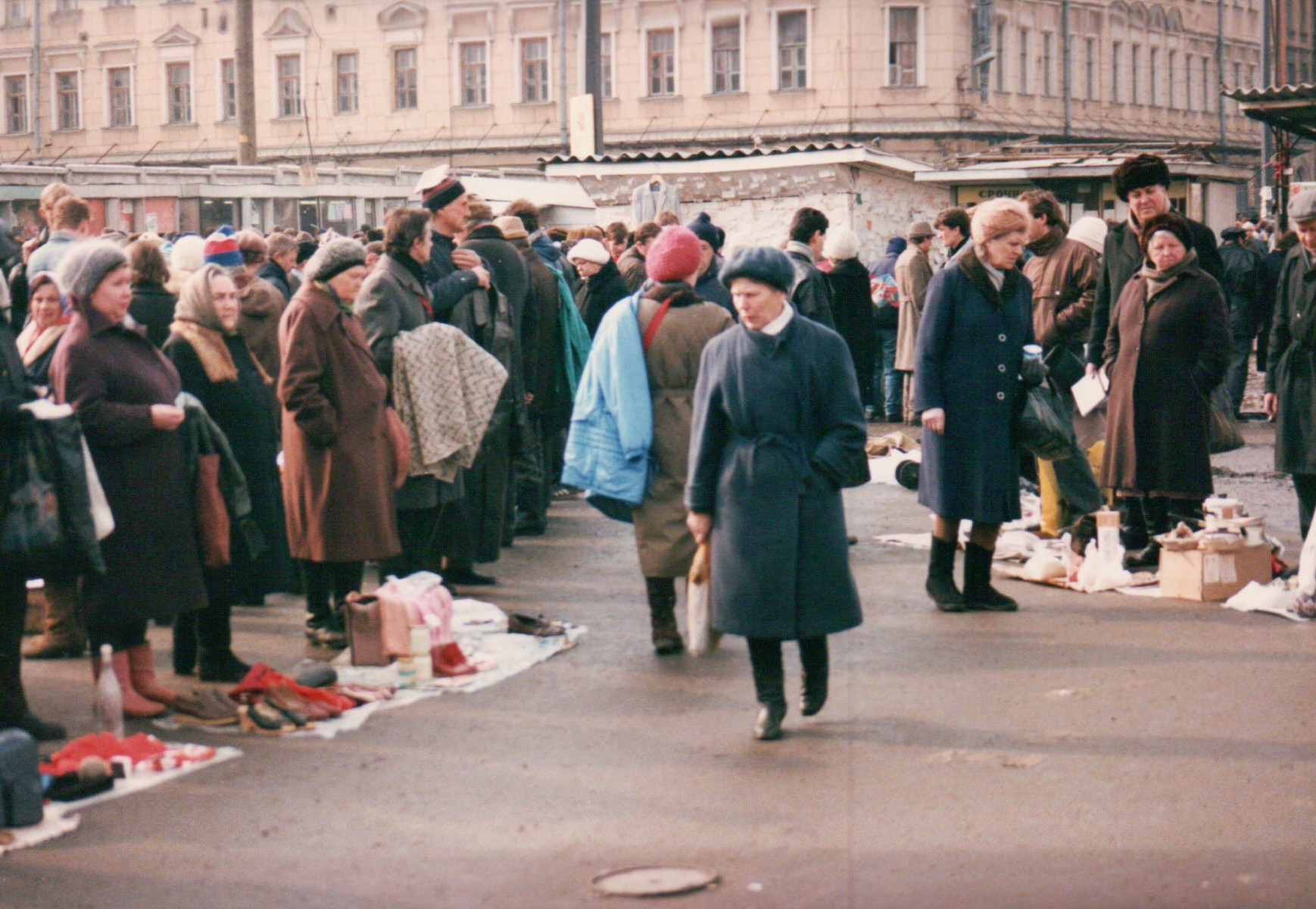
A street flea market in Rostov-on-Don, 1992

The sharp increase in the money supply was influenced by large foreign currency deposits that state-run enterprises and individuals had built up, and by the depreciation of the ruble. Enterprises drew on these deposits to pay wages and other expenses after the Government had tightened restrictions on monetary emissions. Commercial banks monetized enterprise debts by drawing down accounts in foreign banks and drawing on privileged access to accounts in the Central Bank.

=== Inflation ===
In 1992, the first year of economic reform, retail prices in Russia increased by 2,520%. A major cause of the increase was the deregulation of most of the prices in January 1992, a step that prompted an average price increase of 245% in that month alone. By 1993 the annual rate had declined to 240%, still a very high figure. In 1994 the inflation rate had improved to 224%.

Trends in annual inflation rates mask variations in monthly rates, however. In 1994, for example, the government managed to reduce monthly rates from 21% in January to 4% in August, but rates climbed once again, to 16.4% by December and 18% by January 1995. Instability in Russian monetary policy caused the variations. After tightening the flow of money early in 1994, the Government loosened its restrictions in response to demands for credits by agriculture, industries in the Far North, and some favored large enterprises. In 1995 the pattern was avoided more successfully by maintaining the tight monetary policy adopted early in the year and by passing a relatively stringent budget. Thus, the monthly inflation rate held virtually steady below 5% in the last quarter of the year. For the first half of 1996, the inflation rate was 16.5%. However, experts noted that control of inflation was aided substantially by the failure to pay wages to workers in state enterprises, a policy that kept prices low by depressing demand.

An important symptom of Russian macroeconomic instability has been severe fluctuations in the exchange rate of the ruble. From July 1992, when the ruble first could be legally exchanged for United States dollars, to October 1995, the rate of exchange between the ruble and the dollar declined from 144 rubles per US$1 to around 5,000 per US$1. Prior to July 1992, the ruble's rate was set artificially at a highly overvalued level. But rapid changes in the nominal rate (the rate that does not account for inflation) reflected the overall macroeconomic instability. The most drastic example of such fluctuation was the Black Tuesday (1994) 27% reduction in the ruble's value.

In July 1995, the Central Bank announced its intention to maintain the ruble within a band of 4,300 to 4,900 per US$1 through October 1995, but it later extended the period to June 1996. The announcement reflected strengthened fiscal and monetary policies and the buildup of reserves with which the government could defend the ruble. By the end of October 1995, the ruble had stabilized and actually appreciated in inflation-adjusted terms. It remained stable during the first half of 1996. In May 1996, a "crawling band" exchange rate was introduced to allow the ruble to depreciate gradually through the end of 1996, beginning between 5,000 and 5,600 per US$1 and ending between 5,500 and 6,100.

Another sign of currency stabilization was the announcement that effective June 1996, the ruble would become fully convertible on a current-account basis. This meant that Russian citizens and foreigners would be able to convert rubles to other currencies for trade transactions.

=== Privatization ===
In the Soviet era, all enterprises belonged to the state and were supposed to be equally owned among all citizens. Privatization transferred much of this wealth into the hands of a few, making them immensely rich. Stocks of the state-owned enterprises were issued, and these new publicly traded companies were quickly handed to the members of Nomenklatura or known criminal bosses. For example, the director of a factory during the Soviet regime would often become the owner of the same enterprise. During the same period, violent criminal groups often took over state enterprises, clearing the way by assassinations or extortion. Corruption of government officials became an everyday rule of life. Under the government's cover, outrageous financial manipulations were performed that enriched the narrow group of individuals at key positions of the business and government mafia. Many took billions in cash and assets outside of the country in an enormous capital flight.

The largest state enterprises were controversially privatized by President Boris Yeltsin to insiders for far less than they were worth. Many Russians consider these infamous "oligarchs" to be thieves. Through their immense wealth, the oligarchs wielded significant political influence.

== 1991–1992 ==
Government efforts to take over the credit expansion also proved ephemeral in the early years of the transition. Domestic credit increased about nine times between the end of 1991 and 1992. The credit expansion was caused in part by the buildup of enterprise arrears and the RCB's subsequent financing of those arrears. The Government restricted financing to state enterprises after it lifted controls on prices in January 1992, but enterprises faced cash shortages because the decontrol of prices cut demand for their products. Instead of curtailing production, most firms chose to build up inventories. To support continued production under these circumstances, enterprises relied on loans from other enterprises. By mid-1992, when the amount of unpaid interenterprise loans had reached 3.2 trillion rubles (about US$20 billion), the government froze interenterprise debts. Shortly thereafter, the government provided 181 billion rubles (about US$1.1 billion) in credits to enterprises that were still holding debt.

The government also failed to constrain its own expenditures in this period, partially under the influence of the post-Soviet Supreme Soviet of Russia, which encouraged the Soviet-style financing of favored industries. By the end of 1992, the Russian budget deficit was 20% of GDP, much higher than the 5% projected under the economic program and stipulated under the International Monetary Fund (IMF) conditions for international funding. This budget deficit was financed largely by expanding the money supply. These monetary and fiscal policies were a factor along with price liberalization in an inflation rate of over 2,000% in 1992.

In late 1992, deteriorating economic conditions and a sharp conflict with the parliament led Yeltsin to dismiss neoliberal reform advocate Yegor Gaidar as prime minister. Gaidar's successor was Viktor Chernomyrdin, a former head of the State Natural Gas Company (Gazprom).

== 1993 ==
Russian economy since fall of the Soviet Union (2008 international dollars)

Chernomyrdin formed a new government with Boris Fedorov, an economic reformer, as deputy prime minister and finance minister. Fedorov considered macroeconomic stabilization a primary goal of Russian economic policy. In January 1993, Fedorov announced a so-called anticrisis program to control inflation through tight monetary and fiscal policies. Under the program, the government would control money and credit emissions by requiring the RCB to increase interest rates on credits by issuing government bonds, by partially financing budget deficits, and by starting to close inefficient state enterprises. Budget deficits were to be brought under control by limiting wage increases for state enterprises, by establishing quarterly budget deficit targets, and by providing a more efficient social safety net for the unemployed and pensioners.

The printing of money and domestic credit expansion moderated somewhat in 1993. In a public confrontation with the parliament, Yeltsin won a referendum on his economic reform policies that may have given the reformers some political clout to curb state expenditures. In May 1993, the Ministry of Finance and the Central Bank agreed to macroeconomic measures, such as reducing subsidies and increasing revenues, to stabilize the economy. The Central Bank was to raise the discount lending rate to reflect inflation. Based on positive early results from this policy, the IMF extended the first payment of US$1.5 billion to Russia from a special Systemic Transformation Facility (STF) the following July.

Fedorov's anticrisis program and the Government's accord with the Central Bank had some effect. In the first three quarters of 1993, the Central Bank held money expansion to a monthly rate of 19%. It also substantially moderated the expansion of credits during that period. The 1993 annual inflation rate was around 1,000%, a sharp improvement over 1992, but still very high. The improvement figures were exaggerated, however, because state expenditures had been delayed from the last quarter of 1993 to the first quarter of 1994. State enterprise arrears, for example, had built up in 1993 to about 15 trillion rubles (about US$13 billion, according to the mid-1993 exchange rate).

== 1994 ==
In June 1994, Chernomyrdin presented a set of moderate reforms calculated to accommodate the more conservative elements of the Government and parliament while placating reformers and Western creditors. The prime minister pledged to move ahead with restructuring the economy and pursuing fiscal and monetary policies conducive to macroeconomic stabilization. But stabilization was undermined by the Central Bank, which issued credits to enterprises at subsidized rates, and by strong pressure from industrial and agricultural lobbies seeking additional credits.

By October 1994, inflation, which had been reduced by tighter fiscal and monetary policies early in 1994, began to soar once again to dangerous levels. On 11 October, a day that became known as Black Tuesday, the value of the ruble on interbank exchange markets plunged by 27%. Although experts presented a number of theories to explain the drop, including the existence of a conspiracy, the loosening of credit and monetary controls clearly was a significant cause of declining confidence in the Russian economy and its currency.

In late 1994, Yeltsin reasserted his commitment to macroeconomic stabilization by firing Viktor Gerashchenko, head of the Central Bank, and nominating Tatyana Paramonova as his replacement. Although reformers in the Russian government and the IMF and other Western supporters greeted the appointment with skepticism, Paramonova was able to implement a tight monetary policy that ended cheap credits and restrained interest rates (although the money supply fluctuated in 1995). Furthermore, the parliament passed restrictions on the use of monetary policy to finance the state debt, and the Ministry of Finance began to issue government bonds at market rates to finance the deficits.

According to official Russian data, in 1994 the national gross domestic product (GDP) was 604 trillion rubles (about US$207 billion according to the 1994 exchange rate), or about 4% of the United States GDP for that year. But this figure underestimates the size of the Russian economy. Adjusted by a purchasing-power parity formula to account for the lower cost of living in Russia, the 1994 Russian GDP was about US$678 billion, making the Russian economy approximately 10% of the United States economy. In 1994 the adjusted Russian GDP was US$4,573 per capita, approximately 19% of that of the United States.

== 1995 ==
During most of 1995, the government maintained its commitment to tight fiscal constraints, and budget deficits remained within prescribed parameters. However, in 1995 pressures mounted to increase government spending to alleviate wage arrearages, which were becoming a chronic problem within state enterprises, and to improve the increasingly tattered social safety net. In fact, in 1995 and 1996 the state's failure to pay many such obligations (as well as the wages of most state workers) was a major factor in keeping Russia's budget deficit at a moderate level. Conditions changed by the second half of 1995. The members of the State Duma (beginning in 1994, the lower house of the Federal Assembly, Russia's parliament) faced elections in December, and Yeltsin faced dim prospects in his 1996 presidential reelection bid. Therefore, political conditions caused both Duma deputies and the president to make promises to increase spending.

In addition, late in 1995 Yeltsin dismissed Anatoly Chubais, one of the last economic reform advocates remaining in a top Government position, as deputy prime minister in charge of economic policy. In place of Chubais, Yeltsin named Vladimir Kadannikov, a former automobile plant manager whose views were antireform. This move raised concerns in Russia and the West about Yeltsin's commitment to economic reform. Another casualty of the political atmosphere was RCB chairman Paramonova, whose nomination had remained a source of controversy between the State Duma and the Government. In November 1995, Yeltsin was forced to replace her with Sergey Dubinin, a Chernomyrdin protégé who continued the tight-money policy that Paramonova had established.

== 1996 ==
As of mid-1996, four and one-half years after the launching of Russia's post-Soviet economic reform, experts found the results promising but mixed. The Russian economy has passed through a long and wrenching depression. Official Russian economic statistics indicate that from 1990 to the end of 1995, Russian GDP declined by roughly 50%, far greater than the decline that the United States experienced during the Great Depression. (However, alternative estimates by Western neoliberal pro-disregulation analysts described a much less severe decline, taking into account the upward bias of Soviet-era economic data and the downward bias of post-Soviet data. E.g. IMF estimates: ) Much of the decline in production has occurred in the military–industrial complex and other heavy industries that benefited most from the economic priorities of Soviet planners but have much less robust demand in a free market.

But other major sectors such as agriculture, energy, and light industry also suffered from the transition. To enable these sectors to function in a market system, inefficient enterprises had to be closed and workers laid off, with resulting declines in output and consumption. Analysts had expected that Russia's GDP would begin to rise in 1996, but data for the first six months of the year showed a continuing decline, and some Russian experts predicted a new phase of economic crisis in the second half of the year.

The pain of the restructuring has been assuaged somewhat by the emergence of a new private sector. Western experts believe that Russian data overstate the dimensions of Russia's economic collapse by failing to reflect a large portion of the country's private-sector activity. The Russian services sector, especially retail sales, is playing an increasingly vital role in the economy, accounting for nearly half of GDP in 1995. The services sector's activities have not been adequately measured. Data on sector performance are skewed by the underreporting or nonreporting of output that Russia's tax laws encourage. According to Western analysts, by the end of 1995 more than half of GDP and more than 60% of the labor force were based in the private sector.

An important but unconventional service in Russia's economy is "shuttle trading" — the transport and sale of consumer goods by individual entrepreneurs, of whom 5 to 10 million were estimated to be active in 1996. Traders buy goods in foreign countries such as China, Turkey, and the United Arab Emirates and in Russian cities, then sell them on the domestic market where demand is highest. Yevgeniy Yasin, minister of economics, estimated that in 1995 some US$11 billion worth of goods entered Russia in this way. Shuttle traders have been vital in maintaining the standard of living of Russians who cannot afford consumer goods on the conventional market. However, domestic industries such as textiles suffer from this infusion of competing merchandise, whose movement is unmonitored, untaxed, and often mafia-controlled.

The geographical distribution of Russia's wealth has been skewed at least as severely as it was in Soviet times. By the mid-1990s, economic power was being concentrated in Moscow at an even faster rate than the federal government was losing political power in the rest of the country. In Moscow an economic oligarchy, composed of politicians, banks, businesspeople, security forces, and city agencies, controlled a huge percentage of Russia's financial assets under the rule of Moscow's energetic and popular mayor, Yuriy Luzhkov. Unfortunately, organized crime also has played a strong role in the growth of the city. Opposed by a weak police force, Moscow's rate of protection rackets, contract murders, kickbacks, and bribes — all intimately connected with the economic infrastructure — has remained among the highest in Russia. Most businesses have not been able to function without paying for some form of mafia protection, informally called a krysha (the Russian word for roof).

Luzhkov, who has close ties to all legitimate power centers in the city, has overseen the construction of sports stadiums, shopping malls, monuments to Moscow's history, and the ornate Christ the Savior Cathedral. In 1994 Yeltsin gave Luzhkov full control over all state property in Moscow. In the first half of 1996, the city privatized state enterprises at the rate of US$1 billion per year, a faster rate than the entire national privatization process in the same period. Under Luzhkov's leadership, the city government also acquired full or major interests in a wide variety of enterprises — from banking, hotels, and construction to bakeries and beauty salons. Such ownership has allowed Luzhkov's planners to manipulate resources efficiently and with little or no competition. Meanwhile, Moscow also became the center of foreign investment in Russia, often to the exclusion of other regions. For example, the McDonald's fast-food chain, which began operations in Moscow in 1990, enjoyed immediate success but expanded only in Moscow. The concentration of Russia's banking industry in Moscow gave the city a huge advantage in competing for foreign commercial activity.

In mid-1996 the national government appeared to have achieved some degree of macroeconomic stability. However, longer-term stability depends on the ability of policy makers to withstand the inflationary pressures of demands for state subsidies and easier credits for failing enterprises and other special interests. (Chubais estimated that spending promises made during Yeltsin's campaign amounted to US$250 per voter, which if actually spent would approximately double the national budget deficit; most of Yeltsin's pledges seemingly were forgotten shortly after his reelection.)

By 1996 the structure of Russian economic output had shifted far enough that it more closely resembled that of a developed market economy than the distorted Soviet central-planning model. With the decline in demand for defense industry goods, overall production has shifted from heavy industry to consumer production. However, in the mid-1990s the low quality of most domestically produced consumer goods continued to limit enterprises' profits and therefore their ability to modernize production operations. On the other side of the "vicious circle", reliance on an outmoded production system guaranteed that product quality would remain low and uncompetitive.

Most prices were left to the market, although local and regional governments control the prices of some staples. Energy prices remain controlled, but the Government has been shifting these prices upward to close the gap with world market prices.

A 1996 government report quantified so-called "shadow economy" which yields no taxes or government statistics as accounting for about 51% of the economy and 40% of its cash turnover.

== 1997–1998 ==
By the end of 1997, Russia had achieved some progress. Inflation had been brought under control, the ruble was stabilized, and an ambitious privatization program had transferred thousands of enterprises to private ownership. Some important market-oriented laws had also been passed, including a commercial code governing business relations and the establishment of an arbitration court for resolving economic disputes.

But in 1998 difficulties in implementing fiscal reforms aimed at raising government revenues and a dependence on short-term borrowing to finance budget deficits led to a serious financial crisis in 1998, contributing to a sharp decline in Russia's earnings from oil exports and resulting in an exodus of foreign investors. The government allowed the ruble to fall precipitously and then stopped payment on $40 billion in ruble GKOs, the short-term treasury bonds widely held by foreign investors.

== 1999 ==
In 1999, output increased for only the second time since 1991, by an officially estimated 6.4%, regaining 4.6% drop of 1998. This increase was achieved despite a year of potential turmoil that included the tenure of three premiers and culminated in the New Year's Eve resignation of President Boris Yeltsin. Of great help was the tripling of international oil prices in the second half of 1999, raising the export surplus to $29 billion.

On the negative side, inflation rose to an average 85% in 1998, compared with an 11% average in 1997 and a hoped-for 36% average in 1999. Ordinary persons found their wages falling by roughly 30% and their pensions by 45%. The Vladimir Putin government gave high priority to supplementing low incomes by paying down wage and pension arrears.

== 2000–2007 ==
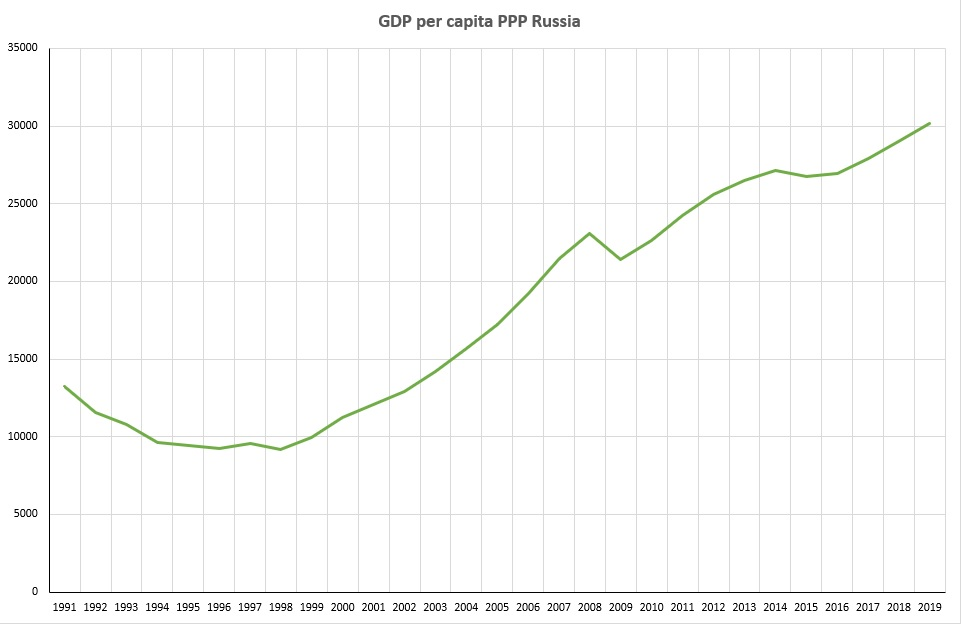
Russia's GDP by purchasing power parity (PPP) in 1991–2019 (in international dollars, not adjusted by inflation)

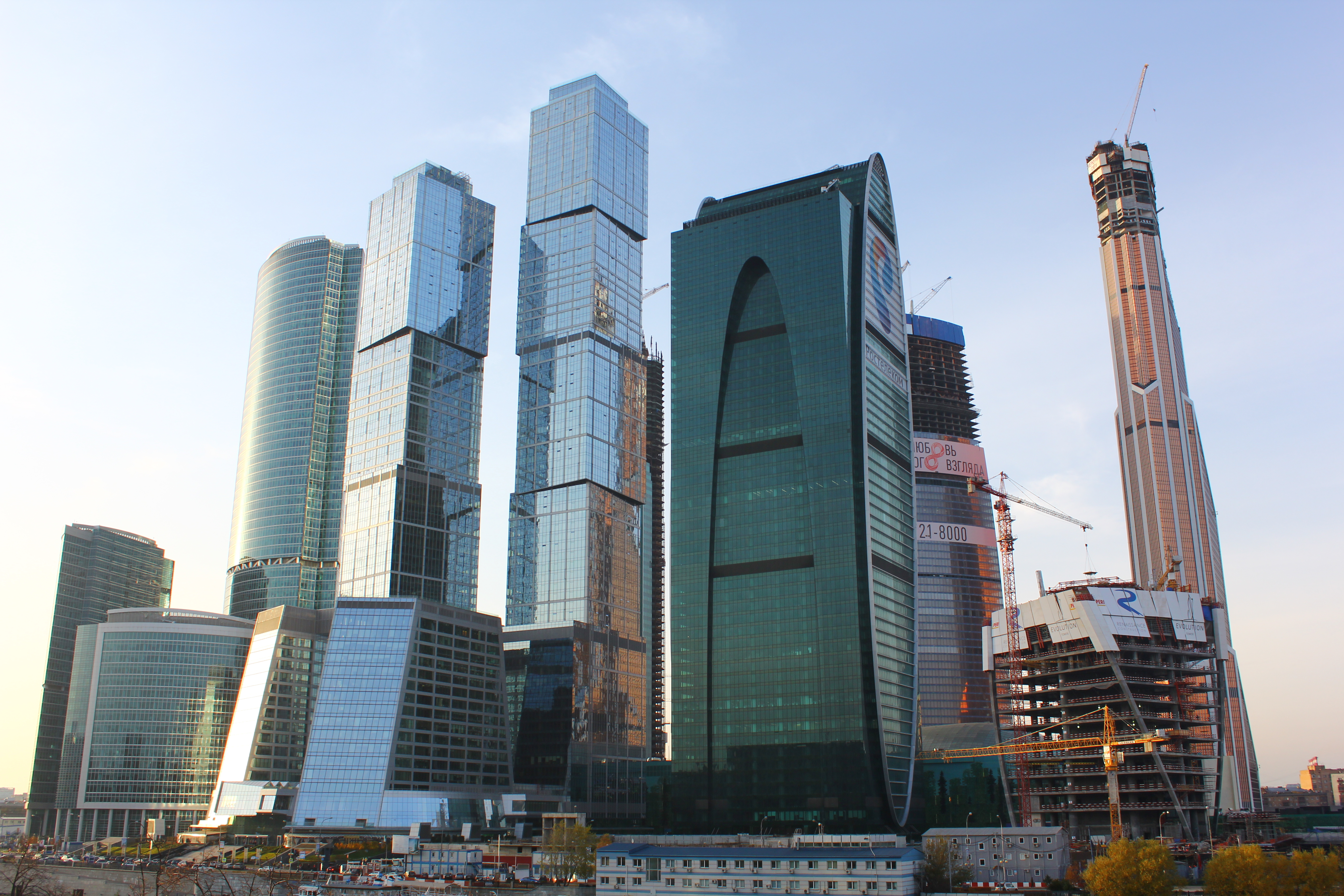
New construction in Moscow International Business Centre

Under the presidency of Vladimir Putin, Russia's economy saw the nominal Gross Domestic Product (GDP) double, climbing from 22nd to 11th largest in the world. The economy made real gains of an average 7% per year (2000: 10%, 2001: 5.1%, 2002: 4.7%, 2003: 7.3%, 2004: 7.2%, 2005: 6.4%, 2006: 8.2%, 2007: 8.5%, 2008: 5.6%), making it the 6th largest economy in the world in GDP (PPP). On a per capita basis, Russian GDP was US$11,339 per individual in 2008, making Russians 57th richest on both a purchasing power and nominal basis.

Real incomes more than doubled and the average salary increased eightfold from $80 to $640. The volume of consumer credit between 2000 and 2006 increased 45 times, and during that same time period, the middle class grew from 8 million to 55 million, an increase of 7 times. The number of people living below the poverty line also decreased from 30% in 2000 to 14% in 2008.

Inflation remained a problem however, as the government failed to contain the growth of prices. Between 1999 and 2007 inflation was kept at the forecast ceiling only twice, and in 2007 the inflation exceeded that of 2006, continuing an upward trend at the beginning of 2008.

In the June 2002 G8 Summit, leaders of the eight nations signed a statement agreeing to explore cancellation of some of Russia's old Soviet debt to use the savings for safeguarding materials in Russia that could be used by terrorists. Under the proposed deal, $10 billion would come from the United States and $10 billion from other G-8 countries over 10 years.

In 2003, the debt has risen to $19 billion due to higher Ministry of Finance and Eurobond payments. However, $1 billion of this has been prepaid, and some of the private sector debt may already have been repurchased. Russia continued to explore debt swap/exchange opportunities.

On 1 January 2004, the Stabilization fund of the Russian Federation was established by the Government of Russia as a part of the federal budget to balance it if oil price falls. Now the Stabilization fund of the Russian Federation is being modernized. The Stabilization Fund was divided into two parts on 1 February 2008. The first part is a reserve fund equal to 10 percent of GDP (10% of GDP equals to about $200 billion now), and is invested in a similar way as the Stabilization Fund. The second part is turned into the National Prosperity Fund of Russian Federation. The National Prosperity Fund is to be invested into more risky instruments, including the shares of foreign companies. Shyhkin, Maxim. "Stabilization Fund to Be Converted into National Prosperity". Archived from the original on 30 September 2007.

The Russian economy remained commodity-driven despite its growth. Payments from the fuel and energy sector in the form of customs duties and taxes accounted for nearly half of the federal budget's revenues. The large majority of Russia's exports was made up by raw materials and fertilizers, although exports as a whole accounted for only 8.7% of the GDP in 2007, compared to 20% in 2000.

There was also a growing gap between rich and poor in Russia. Between 2000 and 2007 the incomes of the rich grew from approximately 14 times to 17 times larger than the incomes of the poor. The income differentiation ratio shows that the 10% of Russia's rich live increasingly better than the 10% of the poor, amongst whom are mostly pensioners and unskilled workers in depressive regions. (See: Gini Coefficient)

Russia has been experiencing a boom in capital investment since the beginning of 2007. Capital investment showed record growth in June, rising 27.2 percent over June of last year in real terms (adjusted for price changes), to 579.8 billion rubles, with construction industry leading the way. That is a rise of 58 percent in nominal terms and a better showing than in China. Modern Russia has never before seen such a growth rate. The rate of investment in Russia rose 22.3 percent in the first half of 2007 compared to the same period the year before. The increase during that period in 2005 was only 11 percent. The statistics significantly exceed both the conservative prognoses of the Ministry of Economic Development and Trade and less conservative independent analyses. According to Interfax, the consensus among analysts at the end of last month 15.3-percent growth compared to last year.

As of 2007 real GDP increased by the highest percentage since the fall of the Soviet Union at 8.1%, the ruble remains stable, inflation has been moderate, and investment began to increase again. In 2007 the World Bank declared that the Russian economy had achieved "unprecedented macroeconomic stability". Russia is making progress in meeting its foreign debts obligations. During 2000–01, Russia not only met its external debt services but also made large advance repayments of principal on IMF loans but also built up Central Bank reserves with government budget, trade, and current account surpluses. The FY 2002 Russian Government budget assumes payment of roughly $14 billion in official debt service payments falling due. Large current account surpluses have brought a rapid appreciation of the ruble over the past several years. This has meant that Russia has given back much of the terms-of-trade advantage that it gained when the ruble fell by 60% during the debt crisis. Oil and gas dominate Russian exports, so Russia remains highly dependent upon the price of energy. Loan and deposit rates at or below the inflation rate inhibit the growth of the banking system and make the allocation of capital and risk much less efficient than it would be otherwise.

By the end of first decade of the 21st century, the ECB reported that the country has caught a new strain of Dutch disease.

== 2008–2009 Great Recession ==
Arms sales increased to the point where Russia was second (with 0.6 the amount of US arms sale) in the world in sale of weapons, the IT industry recorded a record year of growth concentrating on high end niches like algorithm design and microelectronics, while leaving the lesser end work to India and China. Russia was the world's third biggest destination for outsourcing software behind India and China. The space launch industry was now the world's second largest behind the European Ariane 5 and nuclear power plant companies were going from strength to strength, selling plants to China and India, and signed a joint venture with Toshiba to develop cutting edge power plants. The civilian aerospace industry developed the Sukhoi Superjet, as well as the upcoming MS 21 project to compete with Boeing and Airbus.

The Great Recession in Russia was a crisis during 2008–2009 in the Russian financial markets as well as an economic recession that was compounded by political fears after the war with Georgia and by the plummeting price of Urals heavy crude oil, which lost more than 70% of its value since its record peak of US$147 on 4 July 2008 before rebounding moderately in 2009. According to the World Bank, Russia's strong short-term macroeconomic fundamentals made it better prepared than many emerging economies to deal with the crisis, but its underlying structural weaknesses and high dependence on the price of a single commodity made its impact more pronounced than would otherwise be the case.

In late 2008 during the onset of the crisis, Russian markets plummeted and more than $1 trillion had been wiped off the value of Russia's shares, although Russian stocks rebounded in 2009 becoming the world's best performers, with the MICEX Index having more than doubled in value and regaining half its 2008 losses.

In September 2009 the Russian government announced plans to sell state energy and transport holdings in order to help plug the budget deficit and to help improve the nation's aging infrastructure. The state earmarked about 5,500 enterprises for divestment and plans to sell shares in companies that are already publicly traded, including Rosneft, the country's biggest oil producer.

From July 2008 – January 2009, Russia's foreign exchange reserves (FXR) fell by $210 billion from their peak to $386 billion as the central bank adopted a policy of gradual devaluation to combat the sharp devaluation of the ruble. The ruble weakened 35% against the dollar from the onset of the crisis in August to January 2009. As the ruble stabilized in January the reserves began to steadily grow again throughout 2009, reaching a year-long high of $452 billion by year's-end.

Russia's economy emerged from recession in the third quarter of 2009 after two quarters of record negative growth. GDP contracted by 7.9% for the whole of 2009.

== 2010–2014 ==
In March 2010, the World Bank report noted that Russia's economic losses were lower than expected at the beginning of the crisis. According to the World Bank, some of this is due to large-scale anti-crisis measures that the government has taken.

In the first quarter of 2010, GDP growth rate (2.9%) and the growth of industrial production (5.8%), Russia took the 2nd place among the "Big Eight", second only to Japan.

As of 2010, nominal GDP grew by 4.0%, in 2011 by 4,3% and in 2012 by 3.4%. In 2012 more than the 12.5% of the population was below Russian line of poverty. The average net income per capita was according to Rosstat 22691 rubles per month.

== 2014–2017 financial crisis ==
The 2014–2017 financial crisis was the result of the collapse of the Russian ruble beginning in the second half of 2014. A decline in confidence in the Russian economy caused investors to sell off their Russian assets, which led to a decline in the value of the Russian ruble and sparked fears of a Russian financial crisis. The lack of confidence in the Russian economy stemmed from at least two major sources. The first was the fall in the price of oil in 2014. Crude oil, a major export of Russia, declined in price by nearly 50% between its yearly high in June 2014 and 16 December 2014. The second was the result of international economic sanctions imposed on Russia following Russia's 2014 annexation of Crimea and the subsequent Russo-Ukrainian War.

The crisis affected the Russian economy, both consumers and companies, and regional financial markets, as well as Putin's ambitions regarding the Eurasian Economic Union. The Russian stock market in particular experienced large declines with a 30% drop in the RTS Index from the beginning of December through 16 December 2014.

== 2022 invasion of Ukraine ==
Economic sanctions affected Russia from the first day of the invasion, with the stock market falling by up to 39% (RTS Index). The Russian ruble fell to record lows, as Russians rushed to exchange currency. Stock exchanges in Moscow and St. Petersburg were suspended until at least 18 March, making it the longest closure in Russia's history. On 26 February, S&P Global Ratings downgraded the Russian government credit rating to "junk", causing funds that require investment-grade bonds to dump Russian debt, making further borrowing very difficult for Russia.

The Central Bank of Russia announced interventions, its first since the 2014 annexation of Crimea, to stabilise the market. On 28 February, it raised interest rates to 20% and banned foreigners from selling local securities. According to a former deputy chairman of the Russian central bank, the sanctions put the Russian National Wealth Fund at risk of disappearing. With the value of the Russian ruble and the share prices for Russian equities falling on major exchanges, the Moscow Exchange was closed for a day, which was afterwards extended to over a week. As of 28 February, the price of Russia's credit default swaps signalled about a 56% chance of default. Fitch Ratings feared that Russia would imminently default on its debts.

On 27 February, BP, one of the world's seven largest oil and gas companies and the single largest foreign investor in Russia, announced it was divesting from Rosneft. The Rosneft interest comprised about half of BP's oil and gas reserves and a third of its production. The divestment was projected to cost the company up to $25 billion, and analysts noted that it was unlikely that BP would be able to recover anywhere near the value of Rosneft. The same day, the Government Pension Fund of Norway, the world's largest sovereign wealth fund, announced that it would divest itself from its Russian assets. The fund owned about 25 billion Norwegian krone ($2.83 billion) in Russian company shares and government bonds.

On 28 February, Shell also announced that it would be pulling its investments in Russia. On 1 March, the Italian energy company Eni announced that it would cancel its investments into the Blue Stream pipeline. The same day, the world's largest shipping companies, Maersk and Mediterranean Shipping Company, suspended all container shipments to Russia, excluding foodstuffs, medical, and humanitarian supplies.

== See also ==
- Timeline of largest projects in the Russian economy
- Economy of the Soviet Union
