= Russian financial crisis =

Russian financial crisis may refer to:

- 1998 Russian financial crisis
- Great Recession in Russia (2008–2009)
- Russian financial crisis (2014–2017)
- 2022 Russian financial crisis, which started in the aftermath of the Russian invasion of Ukraine.
