= MOEX =

MOEX may refer to:

- Mitsui Oil Exploration, a Japanese oil exploration company
- MOEX Russia Index, a stock market index based on the Moscow Exchange
- Moscow Exchange, a Russian trading exchange
