= Russian financial crisis (2014–2016) =

Period of devaluation of the Russian rouble, linked to the Crimean conflict

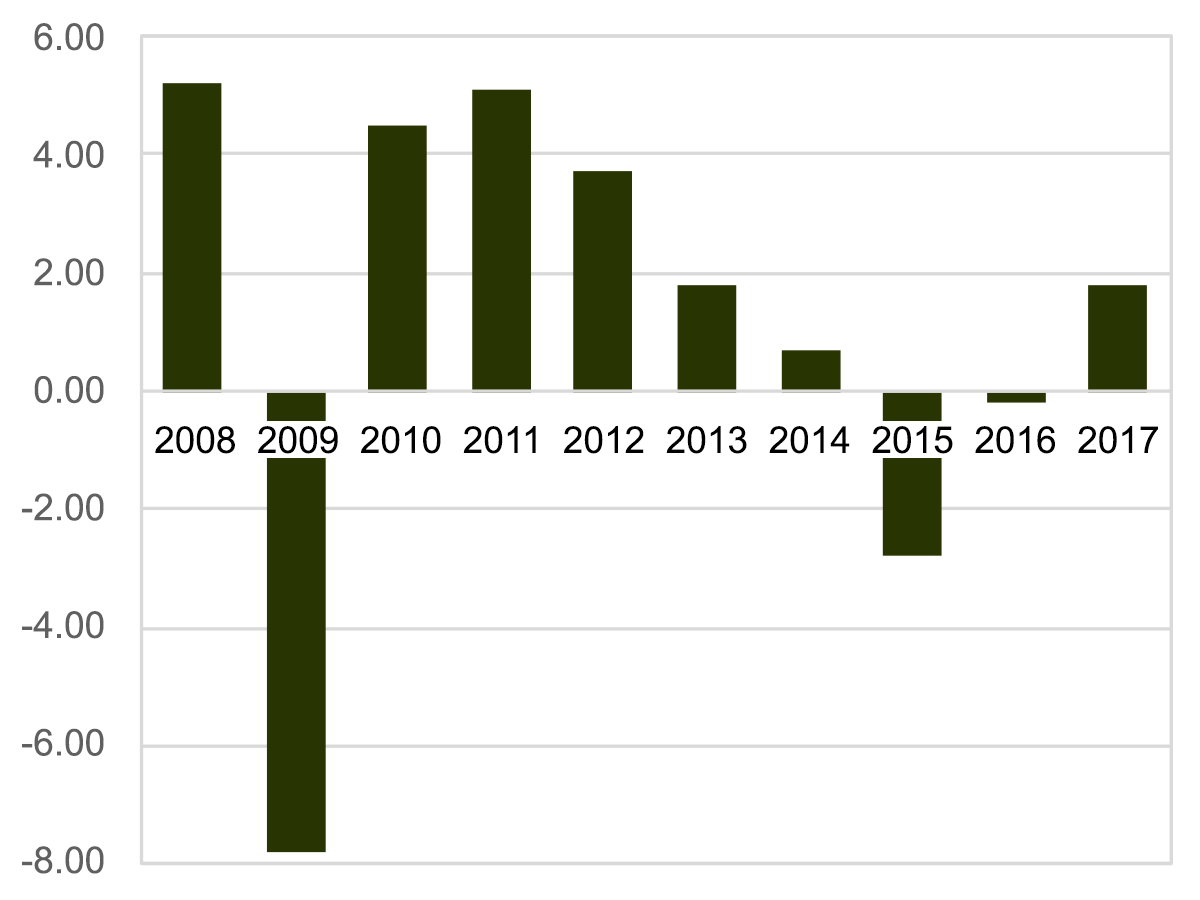
Annual percentage GDP growth rate of Russia, 2008–2017

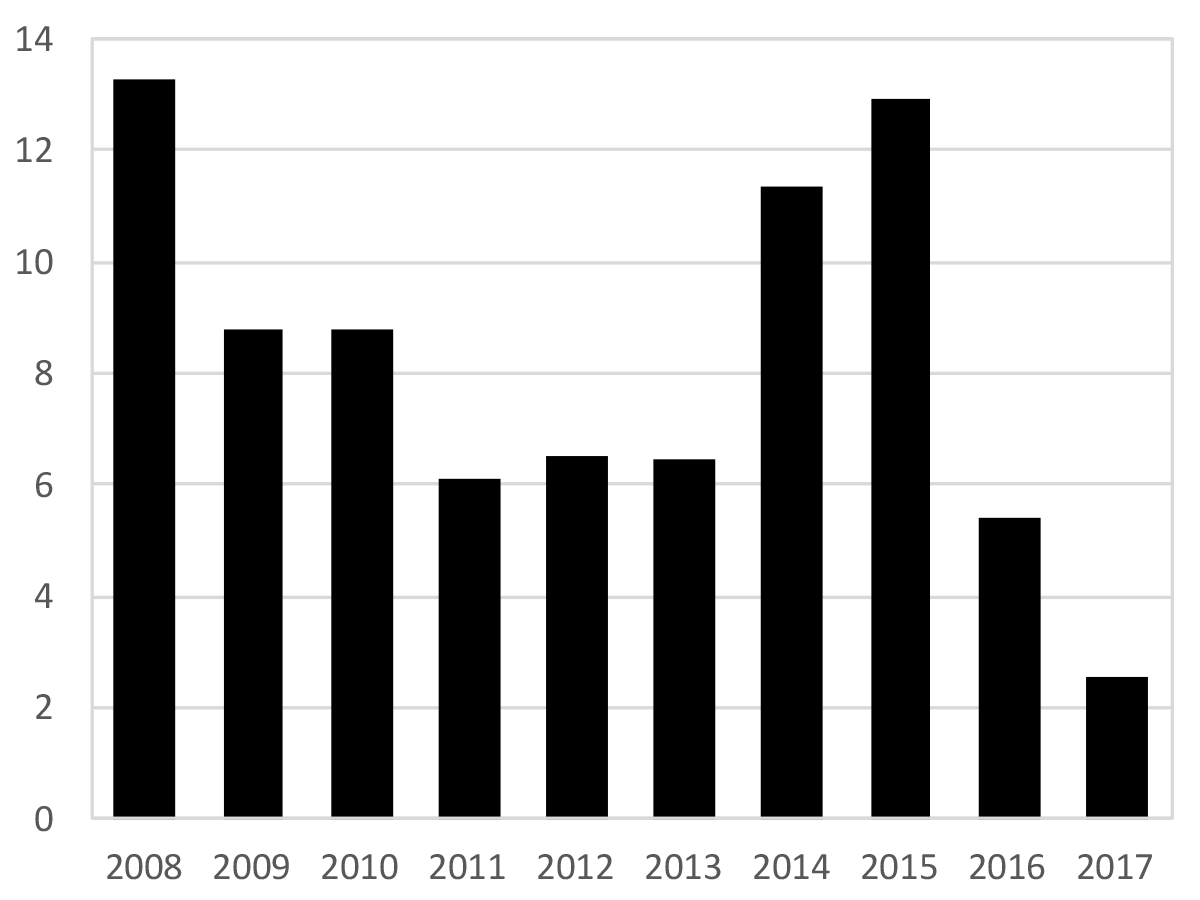
Yearly inflation in Russia since 2008

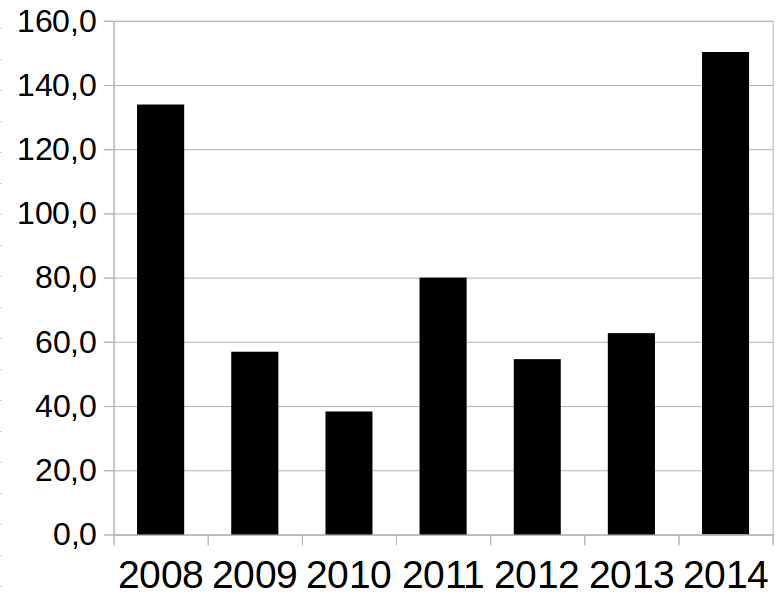
Capital outflow from Russia, billions of USD

The financial crisis in Russia in 2014–2016 resulted from the drop in oil prices and, to a lesser extent, sanctions. It began with a devaluation of the Russian rouble in the second half of 2014, which led to high inflation at the end of the year. The Russian Central Bank adjusted its monetary policy and successfully stabilized the economic situation. As a result, Russian GDP contracted 3.7% in 2015.

The crisis stemmed from at least two major causes. The first was the fall in oil prices in 2014. Crude oil, a major Russian export, fell nearly 50% between its yearly high in June 2014 and 16 December 2014. The second is the result of international economic sanctions imposed on Russia following Russia's annexation of Crimea, the war in Donbas and the broader Russo-Ukrainian War.

Capital outflows of $154B and balance-of-payments shocks put additional pressure on the currency, which led to a rise in inflation at the end of the year. In response, the Central Bank accelerated the move to a floating exchange rate, sharply increased interest rates from 8% in August to 17% in December and spent $107.5B of Russian foreign reserves in 2014 alone to stabilize the economy, which was ultimately successful.

The crisis affected the Russian economy, consumers and companies, regional financial markets, and Putin's ambition for the Eurasian Economic Union. The Russian stock market fell sharply, with the RTS Index dropping 30% from the beginning of December through 16 December 2014.

During the financial crisis, the economy shifted toward state ownership, with 60% of productive assets in the hands of the government. By 2016, the Russian economy rebounded with 0.3% GDP growth and officially exited the recession. In January 2017, Russia had foreign currency reserves of around $391 billion, an inflation rate of 5.0% and interest rate of 10.0%. (Note: The rate is set by Central Bank of Russia)

Following the 2022 Russian invasion of Ukraine, the country faced another financial crisis.

== Causes ==
Timeline of the Russian rouble exchange rate
Event	Date	RUB per USD	Ref
Start of Euromaidan	21 November 2013	32.9975	
Annexation of Crimea	18 March 2014	36.2477	
Minsk Protocol	5 September 2014	37.0028	
Donbas general elections	2 November 2014	43.0072	
Central Bank intervention	16 December 2014	68.4910	
Minsk II	11 February 2015	66.0305	

=== Economic sanctions ===
The United States, the European Union and many other countries had imposed economic sanctions on Russia following the start of the Russo-Ukrainian War in 2014, including Russia's annexation of Crimea and the War in Donbass. Despite the financial crisis, international aid to Russia was not considered likely.

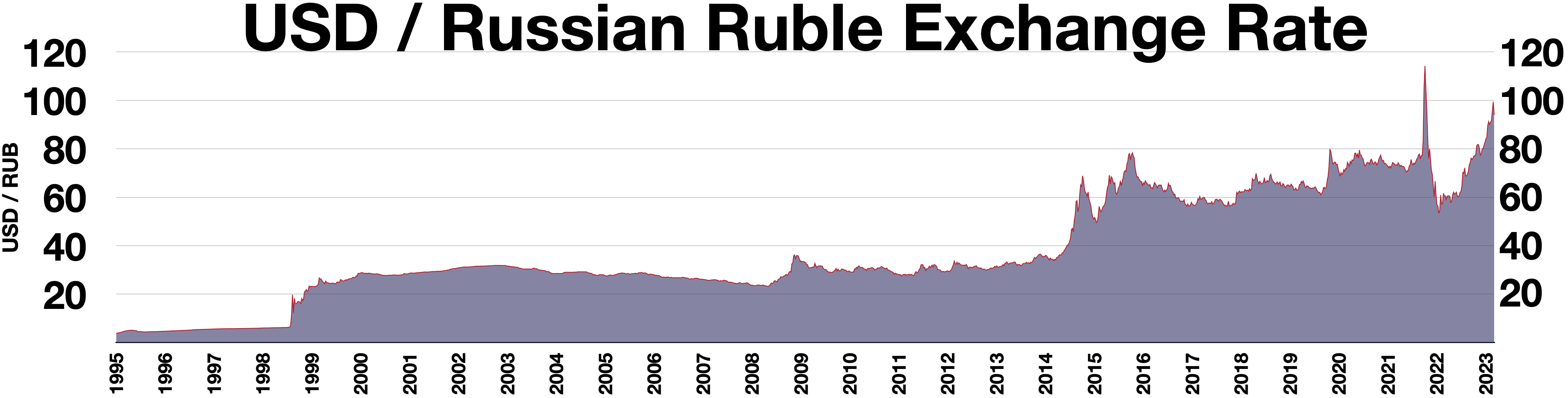
US Dollar / Russian rouble Exchange Rate 2001-2022

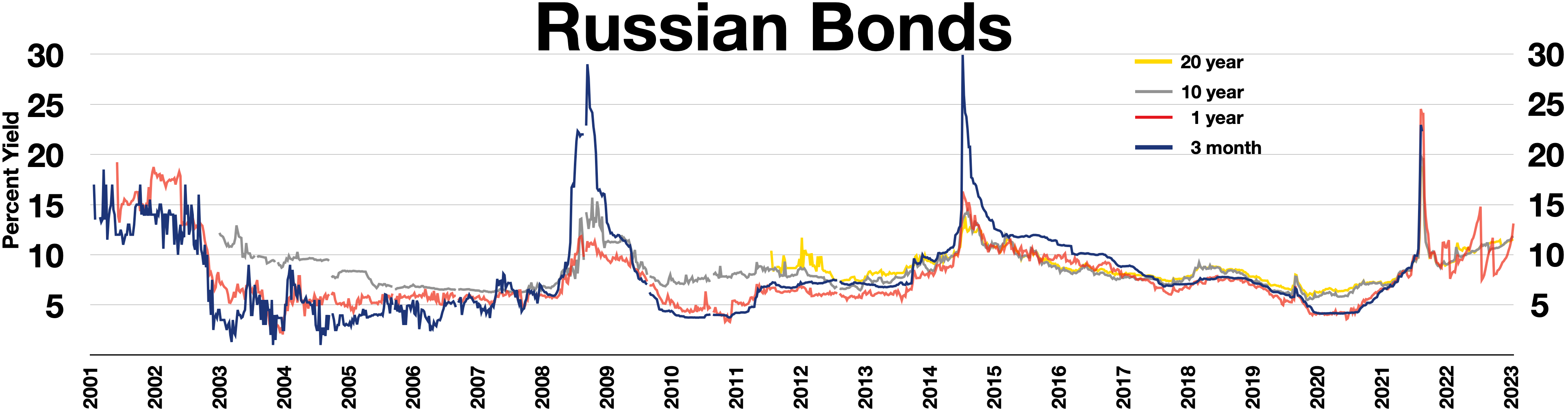
Russian bonds, Inverted yield curves to tame inflation during their wars (Russo-Georgian War, Russo-Ukrainian War, 2022 Russian invasion of Ukraine) 20 year bond 10 year bond 1 year bond 3 month bond

Economic sanctions contributed to the decline of the rouble since some Russian oil companies have been prevented from rolling over debt, forcing them to exchange their roubles for U.S. dollars or other foreign currencies on the open market to meet their interest payment obligations on their existing debt.

The impact of the international sanctions on Russian economy has been limited by design, since the sanctions only affected a limited number of individuals and companies. Russian counter-sanctions however reduced imports of food into Russia, which led to rising inflation and an increase in food prices. As result, the average salary decreased and the number of people living under the poverty line increased.

=== Fall in oil prices ===
The Russian economy depends largely on crude oil exports. In February 2014 crude oil prices started to slide down due to the boom in American shale oil production. For every $1 decline in crude oil prices, the Russian economy loses billions of dollars. The price of oil fell from $100 per barrel in June 2014 to $60 per barrel in December 2014. The drop in the oil prices was caused by a drop in the demand for oil across the world, as well as increased oil production in the United States. This fall in oil prices hit Russia hard, as roughly half of the Russian Federation's governmental revenue comes from the sale of oil and gas. Russia's economy suffers from Dutch disease, a term economists use to describe a situation in which a country focuses on developing its natural resources to the detriment of other economic activity. In 2014, Russia needed an oil price of $100 per barrel to have a balanced budget. As the price of oil falls, Russia continues to sell its oil at operational capacity, without the ability to dramatically increase oil production to compensate for the lower price, and thus due to the reduced profit from selling oil, the government has substantially lower income. Russia is not alone in feeling the ill effects of falling oil prices, as several other countries, including Venezuela, Nigeria, and Kazakhstan, also faced reduced revenues and economic activity.

In August 2015, oil prices fell to US$37 per barrel and then bounced to more than US$45 on 28 August. Now as OPEC has reduced production from November 2016 oil prices have started to move up and so does the rouble.

=== Other possible causes ===
Russian President Vladimir Putin has been accused by critics of running a kleptocracy, in which a small number of rent-seeking plutocrats drain the economy. Russia was ranked second in the world on The Economist's 2014 crony-capitalism index and first in their 2016 rankings. Putin accused the Western nations of engineering the Russian economic crisis. He has also said, "Our (Western) partners have not stopped. They decided that they are winners, they are an empire now and the rest are vassals and they have to be driven into a corner."

Russia was already near a recession before its annexation of Crimea, and Russia ranks low on the World Economic Forum's rankings of road quality, technological adaptation, and burden of government regulation. Russia's already-weak economy left it less able to withstand the challenges imposed by low oil prices and international sanctions. The Russian Central Bank's "erratic response" to the falling rouble has also been blamed for deepening the crisis.

== Russian monetary policy ==
=== Decline in the Russian rouble ===
Since the Great Recession, yields on U.S. treasuries and other low-risk assets have decreased due primarily to the liquidity-trap and also unconventional stimulative measures by central banks, such as ZIRP and quantitative easing. This has led investor patterns to become what is known as "reach for yield" with emerging market debt: emerging market debt is being bought by developed economy investors due to investors seeking greater interest on their holdings of debt. This led to increased issuance of debt by Russian companies in foreign currency-denominated terms, with $502 billion in foreign-currency denominated debt as of June 2014, up from $325 billion at the end of 2007.

The recent decline in the rouble has increased the costs for Russian companies to make interest payments on debt issued in U.S. dollar or other foreign currencies that have strengthened against the rouble; thus it costs Russian companies more of their rouble-denominated revenue to repay their debt holders in dollars or other foreign currencies. As of March 2016, the rouble was devalued more than 50 percent since July 2014.

Official exchange rates RUB/USD and RUB/EUR set by the Bank of Russia
United States dollar
Euro

=== Central Bank intervention ===
On 15 December 2014, Russia had foreign currency reserves worth around $400 billion, the sixth-highest total in the world, giving Russia the ability to prop up the rouble. On 15 December, the Central Bank of Russia spent almost $2 billion in an attempt to strengthen the declining rouble.

Just before 1 a.m. local time on 16 December 2014, the Central Bank increased its key interest rate from 10.5% to 17% in an attempt to slow or stop the decline of the rouble. It was the sixth increase in interest rates by the Central Bank during 2014.

Despite the Central Bank's intervention, the rouble declined further, to as low as 79 roubles to one U.S. dollar, compared to 33 roubles to the dollar in January 2014. The rouble strengthened from its lows on 16 December after the Central Bank said it would not implement capital controls.

On 22 December, the Central Bank lent $530 million to Trust Bank, which became the first bank to accept a government bailout during the crisis.

On 12 January 2015, the Central Bank's 2014 data of net currency interventions was reported by Interfax, a Russian news agency, to have been $76.13 billion and €5,410,000,000, including $11.9 billion in December 2014.

In 2015, the Central Bank decreased interest rates numerous times. On 30 January, the Bank cut the interest rate from 17% to 15%. On 13 March, it was lowered to 14%, and 12.5% on 30 April. Inflation had slowed to 16.5% by 26 April, down from approximately 17% in March. On 15 June, the interest rate was lowered to 11.5%, and 11% on 31 July. Inflation as of 27 July was 15.8%, an increase from 15.3% in June, as a result of a temporary tariff increase, said the Bank.

State-owned agency TASS reported a loss of US$5.4 billion in the Bank's foreign reserves to US$369.2 billion on the week of 23–30 October.

In January 2017, Russia had foreign currency reserves of around $391 billion, an inflation rate of 5.0% and interest rate of 10.0%.

== Financial, economic, and social impact ==
=== Impact on Russia ===
On 16 December 2014, the RTS Index, denominated in U.S. dollars, declined 12%, the most on any given day since the 2008 financial crisis in November 2008, and the MICEX Index declined 8.1% at one point before ending the day higher. This increased the decline of RTS Index, up until 16 December, of nearly 30% during the month of December. In response to rising interest rates and bank runs, the interest rate on Russian three-month interbank loans rose to 28.3%, higher than at any point in the Great Recession of 2008.

To get rid of the Russian roubles which were declining in value, many Russians chose to purchase durable goods, such as washing machines, televisions, furniture, and jewelry, and to convert their pensions and savings from roubles to US dollars and euros. Several currency changers offered cash only at much greater exchange rates: USD up to 99.8 RUB (official rate was 61.15) and EUR up to 120–150 RUB (official rate was 76.15).

Some foreign companies halted their business activities in Russia, including Volvo car dealerships and the online stores of Apple and Steam, due to the high volatility and decline of the Russian rouble. Additionally, IKEA temporarily suspended sales of certain goods in Russia, in part due to the volatility and in part due to a lack of adequate supply, as numerous Russians bought IKEA furniture.

Many Western financial institutions, including Goldman Sachs, started cutting the flow of cash to Russian companies since they had restricted some longer-term rouble-denominated repurchase agreements (repos). These actions were intended to protect Western firms from the high volatility of the rouble. Repos had allowed Russian companies to exchange securities for cash with Western financial institutions, so the restrictions added pressure to the Russian financial system.

Russia may also be excluded from the MSCI Emerging Markets Index, composed of 26 countries' indices, if capital controls or currency controls are implemented by Russia, since such measures would make it more difficult for foreign entities to access Russian securities markets. Russia would be reclassified as a standalone market in that event.

The 20 December print edition of The Economist predicted that Russia would face the "lethal combination" of a major recession and high inflation in 2015. Others predicted that the crisis would spread to the banking sector. On the other hand, President Putin has argued that Russia was not in crisis, and that cheaper oil prices would lead to a global economic boom that would push up the price of oil, which would in turn help the Russian economy.

On the week of 15 December, Russian gold and foreign currencies reserves were reduced by "US$15.7 billion to below US$400 billion for the first time since August 2009 and down from [more than] $510 billion at the start of the year." Between 15 and 25 December, annual inflation had climbed to more than 10%. Prices of goods, including beef and fish, rose 40 to 50% within a few months before the end of the year due to Russia's ban on Western imports.

In 2014, car sales in Russia fell by 12% from the previous year. The largest Russian oil company, Rosneft, whose largest shareholding was owned by the British oil company BP at the time, lost U.S. and European assets and 86% of profits in the third quarter 2014. Rosneft attributed the decline to falling oil prices and rouble devaluation.

The crisis threatened the continued existence of the Kontinental Hockey League, and several teams missed or delayed payments to their players.

Russian President Putin ordered Dmitry Medvedev's Cabinet to not take their day off on 2015 New Year's Day because of the crisis.

As of December 2014, prices of meat, fish, and grain were inflated as a result of rouble devaluation. Some businesses had closed down, especially in the far eastern region of Russia's Siberia due to future rising lease fees.

In the first 8 months of 2014 more Russians left the country than in any year since 1999. Many start-ups and companies were seeking to relocate their businesses outside of Russia. The process that was labeled as "Excodus of tech".

The state-owned gas company, Gazprom, lost 86% in the 2014 net income, dropping to 159,000,000,000 ₽ (US$3.1 billion), because of rouble devaluation, plunge on oil prices, Ukraine crisis, and rising impairment costs. Overall revenues of the year grew 6.4% to PP 5.59 trillion ($106.3 billion).

According to a September 2015 survey conducted by Nielsen Russia, 49% of around 1,000 sampled people had not visited a bar in 2015 mainly due to economic crisis; 46%, not a pub; 62%, not a nightclub. In comparison, according to a 2014 survey, 28% had not visited a bar in the previous year, 2014; 32%, not a pub; 45%, not a nightclub. Survey conductors concluded that rising prices in restaurants and bars had been factors to declining attendance in those places.

By the end of 2015 direct foreign investments in Russian economy fell by 92% and more than 200 start-ups ceased to exist by closing down.

==== Demographic consequences ====
Calculations presented by a group of demographers from the Russian Presidential Academy of National Economy and Public Administration suggested the crisis could have very serious demographic consequences (simultaneous growth of mortality and decline of fertility)

As of March 2015, officially, three million Russians more than the previous year lived with less than 9,662₽ (US$169) monthly income, totalling to twenty-three million.

In 2016 over 330,000 Russian citizens applied for US permanent residency through the Green Card lottery program, a 24% increase over the previous year.

=== Global financial markets ===
The financial crisis in Russia affected other global financial markets. U.S. financial markets declined, with the Dow Jones Industrial Average down nearly 3% in 3 business days, in part due to the Russian financial crisis. The crisis drew comparisons to the 1998 Russian financial crisis that affected global markets. Economist Olivier Blanchard of the IMF noted that the uncertainty caused by Russia's economic crisis could lead to greater worldwide risk aversion in a manner similar to the 2008 financial crisis. However, the 2014 international sanctions on Russia decreased Russia's financial connections with the broader financial world, which in turn lowered the risk that an ailing Russian economy would affect the worldwide economy. Since 1998, Russia and many other countries have adopted a floating exchange rate, which could also help to prevent Russian financial woes from affecting the rest of the world.

Foreign exchange trading service FXCM said on 16 December 2014 it would restrict U.S. dollar-rouble trading starting the next day, due to the volatility of the rouble. They also said that most Western banks have stopped reporting the exchange rate of the U.S. dollar for roubles (USD/RUB). Liquidity in the U.S. dollar-rouble market has also declined sharply.

Financial institutions that hold relatively high amounts of Russian debt or other assets were affected by the Russian financial crisis. The PIMCO Emerging Markets Bond Fund also had 21% of its holdings in Russian corporate and sovereign debt as of the end of September 2014, which declined about 7.9% from about 16 November 2014 to 16 December 2014.

Companies from North America and Europe that heavily relied on Russian economy were affected by the crisis. American car company Ford Motor Company experienced a 40% decline in car sales in January–November 2014, according to Association of European Businesses, and terminated "about 950 jobs at its Russia joint in April [2014]." German car company Volkswagen experienced a 20% decline in the same period. American oil company ExxonMobil alongside Rosneft was unable to continue an Arctic project after the discovery of oil there due to sanctions over the Russo-Ukrainian war. British oil company BP lost 17% of market share. French energy company Total S.A. shelved joint shale exploration plans with Russian oil company Lukoil due to sanctions.

German engineering company Siemens lost 14% of Russian revenue in 2014. German sportswear company Adidas closed down stores and suspended development plans in Russia. Danish beer company Carlsberg Group lost more than 20% of Russian shares. American fast food company McDonald's closed twelve stores, which Russian officials said was due to "sanitary violations". French food conglomerate Danone experienced a loss of operating margins in the first half of 2014 due to rising milk prices.

In January 2015, ratings agency Standard & Poor's lowered Russia's credit rating to junk status and economic rating from BBB− to BB+. Moody's followed this decision in February 2015.

=== Impact on former republics of the Soviet Union ===
The devaluation of the Russian rouble affected the currencies of many post-Soviet states, which are tied through trade and remittances by migrant workers in Russia. For many post-Soviet states, trade with Russia represents over 5% of their GDP.

- Ukraine: Ukrainian officials abandoned dollar auctions and raised interest rates to 19.5 percent in 2015. The hryvnia was devalued sixty percent against the dollar between August 2014 and March 2015.
- Belarus: The Belarusian rubel plummeted to its weakest since 1998 by 15 December.
- Uzbekistan: the soum was devalued nine percent on 12 December. According to Daniil Kislov, who runs Fergana.ru, a central Asia news portal, "there are 2.4 million Uzbek migrants in Russia, and those are just the official figures."
- Kazakhstan: The tenge was devalued 19–20 per cent in February 2014, and nearly 40 percent in September 2015 However, the more significant devaluation of the rouble is making Kazakh goods less affordable to Russian citizens which reduces sales and manufacturing growth.
- Georgia: The lari had collapsed to its lowest level versus the dollar in more than a decade by 5 December. By 11 December the lari plunged from the pre-crisis average of ₾1.75 to the dollar to ₾1.92-₾1.98. Between August 2014 and March 2015, the lari was devalued twenty percent.
- Azerbaijan: Low oil prices battered its oil-dependent economy. However, it looks impervious to economic turmoil as the government has maintained in reserve a large stabilization fund which has kept the manat afloat against the dollar within its usual band. Most of the country's trade is done with Turkey. On 21 February 2015 the Central Bank of Azerbaijan devalued the manat by 33.5% to the dollar.
- Lithuania: After abandoning the litas on 31 December 2014, Lithuania adopted the euro on 1 January 2015, the Litas endured some inflation.
- Moldova: The leu was devalued twenty-five percent as of February 2015. The central bank raised interest rates by five hundred basis points.
- Latvia: After abandoning the lats on 31 December 2013, Latvia adopted the euro on 1 January 2014.
- Kyrgyzstan: Remittance rates had dropped to twenty-nine percent as of October 2014 for the first time since 2009. The Kyrgyzstani som was devalued 15 percent on 12 December. Some Kyrgyz migrants returned from Russia to Kyrgyzstan due to the crisis.
- Tajikistan: Remittance rates dropped to 49 percent as of October 2014 for the first time since 2009. The somini was devalued 5.5 percent on 12 December.
- Armenia: The depreciation of the Russian ruble and Russia's overall economic downturn drastically emphasized Armenia's considerable economic dependency on the Russian Federation. The dram depreciated from being traded at around ֏ 410-֏ 415 against the dollar in late November to a record low of 575 to the dollar on 16 December 2014. By mid-December inflation reached 15% to 20%. Parliament Vice-Speaker admitted panic in the country. The dram recovered significantly and stabilized on 18–19 December to around 460–80. However, inflation remained high, reaching forty percent for some products. In the past twelve months as of August 2015, the dram was devalued 15 percent.
- Turkmenistan: The manat was devalued 19 percent in January 2015. Turkmenistan is one of the trading partners of Russia.
- Estonia: Estonia had abandoned the kroon on 31 December 2010 but adopted the euro on 1 January 2011, the economic growth forecast was cut from 3.6 percent to 2.0 percent in April 2014 due to sanctions on Russia. As of April 2014, 11 percent of Estonia's exports had gone to Russia, and 100 percent of its natural gas had been imported from Russia.

==== Chart of currencies of former Soviet republics ====
Official USD exchange rates
Event	Date													
Event	Date	// EUR	AMD	AZN	BYR	GEL	KZT	KGS	LTL (Note: Lithuania adopted the euro on 1 January 2015.)	MDL	TJS	TMT	UAH	UZS
Start of Euromaidan	21 November 2013	0.742	403.82	0.7844	9,332.29	1.6761	152.74	48.8687	2.5622	13.01	4.772	2.8555	8.1978	2,169.605
Annexation of Crimea	18 March 2014	0.719	415.46	0.7843	9,842.75	1.7242	182.34	54.4999	2.4779	13.385	4.8001	2.8550	10.0238	2,236.6599
Ukraine–Russia Gazprom cutoff	16 June 2014	0.737	411.09	0.7843	10,179.93	1.7669	183.13	51.9848	2.5439	13.975	4.9241	2.8503	11.9204	2,320.1599
Russian Central Bank intervention	16 December 2014	0.800	475.19	0.7832	10,948.51	1.85	184.04	57.60	2.7596	15.465	5.1301	2.8503	15.8500	2,413.96

== See also ==
- Bibliography of Vladimir Putin
- Bibliography of Russian history (1991–present)
- Economic impact of the Russian invasion of Ukraine
- Cold War II
- Great Recession in Russia
- 1998 Russian financial crisis
- Eurasian Economic Union
- Economy of the Soviet Union
