= Corvil =

Irish network data analytics company

- Company type: Private
- Industry: Data analysis
- Founded: 2000; 26 years ago
- Headquarters: Dublin, Ireland
- Key people: Donal Byrne (CEO)

Corvil is a network data analytics company based in Dublin, Ireland. It helps businesses make sense of machine data sources and protect performance, security, and transparency of business and infrastructure applications. As of May 2017, prominent financial institutions, such as the New York Stock Exchange, London Stock Exchange, Moscow Stock Exchange, NASDAQ, Nomura, Thomson Reuters, and Commerzbank use Corvil's services.

== History ==
Corvil was founded in 2000 by Professor John Lewis, three Telia employees and three post-graduate students from Trinity College Dublin and is currently led by CEO Donal Byrne.

Corvil offers solutions for electronic processing in the financial field, IT operations, and cybersecurity operations.

IT operations can use Corvil's service to understand IT systems in real-time and improve transparency, performance, and monitoring of applications, infrastructure, services, and users. Cybersecurity operations can use Corvil's analytics to gain full visibility into malicious threats both in real-time and retrospect, allowing for greater threat detection, prevention, and response times.

Corvil has offices in New York, London, Tokyo, Toronto, and Kraków.

In 2019 Corvil was acquired by Pico.
