= John T. Lewis =

Welsh mathematical physicist, worked in Ireland

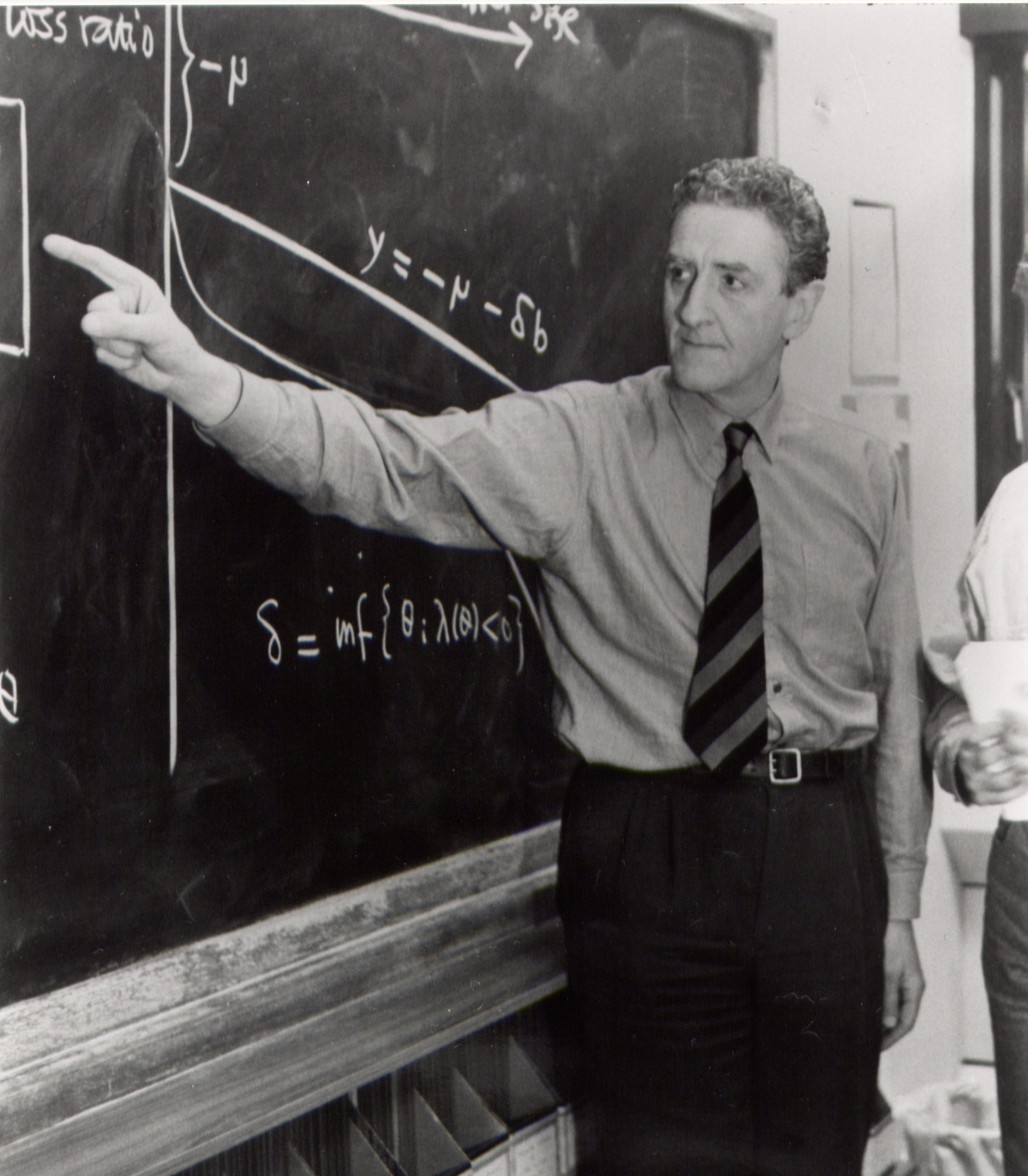
- John T. Lewis in School of Theoretical Physics, Dublin Institute for Advanced Studies
- Born: John Trevor Lewis; 15 April 1932; Swansea, Wales
- Died: 21 January 2004 (aged 71); Dublin, Ireland
- Scientific career
- Doctoral advisor: David Bates, Alexander Dalgarno
- Doctoral students: R. L. Hudson, Hans Maassen

John Trevor Lewis (15 April 1932 – 21 January 2004) was a Welsh mathematical physicist who made contributions to areas including quantum measurement, Bose–Einstein condensation and large deviations theory. He was a senior professor at the Dublin Institute for Advanced Studies (DIAS) in Ireland from 1972, serving as the director of the School of Theoretical Physics from 1975 until his retirement in 2001. He also founded the Communications Networks Research Institute at Dublin Institute of Technology.

== Academic career ==
Lewis was born in Swansea, Wales, and was educated at Cardiff High School and then the Royal Belfast Academical Institution. He then studied at Queen's University Belfast, earning BSc in 1952 and PhD in 1955, the latter for a thesis on "Quantal Calculations Relating to Certain Rate Processes" done with Alexander Dalgarno and David Bates. He moved to Oxford in 1956, initially at Christ Church and later at Brasenose where he acted as Dean. In 1969 he spent a year visiting Rockefeller University and the Institute for Advanced Study. In 1972, he moved to the Dublin Institute for Advanced Studies on the retirement of John L. Synge, where he served as director of the School of Theoretical Physics. He was an honorary professor at Swansea, Cardiff and Trinity College, Dublin. He was a member of the Royal Irish Academy and was its senior vice-president in 1988. He received one of the first honorary doctorates from Dublin Institute of Technology in 1999.

In 1971, he helped to found the Irish branch of Pugwash. With D McQuillan and T West he drew up the draft constitution of the Irish Mathematical Society after the DIAS Christmas Symposium in 1975. From 1985 to 1987 he was president of the Irish Federation of University Teachers.

Lewis was also a founder of, and chief scientist at, Corvil, a company specialising in measurement and performance of Internet traffic.
