= Hans Maassen =

Dutch mathematical physicist

- Born: 1951 (age 74–75)
- Education: University of Groningen
- Known for: Entropic uncertainty principle, quantum Markov chains
- Scientific career
- Fields: Mathematical physics, Quantum probability, Quantum information
- Workplaces: Radboud University Nijmegen, University of Amsterdam
- Doctoral advisor: Nicolaas Marinus Hugenholtz, John T. Lewis
- Website: Maassen’s homepage

Hans Maassen (born 1951) is a Dutch mathematical physicist and emeritus professor specialized in quantum probability and quantum information theory. He is best known as co-author of the Maassen–Uffink entropic uncertainty relation, a fundamental inequality in quantum mechanics. He is an emeritus professor at the Radboud University Nijmegen and holds a joint appointment at the University of Amsterdam.

== Academic career ==
Maassen received his Ph.D. in 1982 from the University of Groningen with a dissertation on quantum Langevin equations and the approach to equilibrium.

He joined Radboud University Nijmegen in 1986 and has been an associate professor in probability and statistics since 1999. In 2013, he was appointed full professor of Quantum Probability and Quantum Information at the University of Amsterdam.

== Research ==
Maassen's research centers on quantum probability, a non-commutative generalization of classical probability theory. His work explores quantum systems through the lens of extended probability calculus, where observables do not necessarily commute.

He is widely recognized for co-authoring a foundational paper on the entropic uncertainty principle with Jos Uffink in 1988, a fundamental inequality in all of quantum physics.

Other areas of his research include:

- Quantum Markov chains and their ergodic theory
- Entanglement and symmetries in quantum systems
- Feedback control in quantum systems
- Applications of quantum probability in optics and information theory
- Development of an integral kernel approach to quantum stochastic calculus (‘Maassen kernels’)

He has collaborated extensively with mathematicians including John T. Lewis, Burkhard Kümmerer and Madalin Guta, and maintains ongoing interdisciplinary collaborations with physicists and computer scientists.

== See also ==
- Quantum probability
- Entropic uncertainty principle
- Mutually unbiased bases
- Quantum information theory
