= Burkhard Kümmerer =

German mathematician

- Born: 9 April 1953 (age 73); Tübingen, West Germany
- Education: University of Tübingen
- Known for: Quantum probability, mathematical aspects of quantum scattering theory
- Scientific career
- Fields: Mathematical physics, Operator algebras, Quantum probability
- Workplaces: University of Stuttgart, Technische Universität Darmstadt
- Website: TU Darmstadt profile

Burkhard Kümmerer (born 9 April 1953) is a German mathematician and university professor working in mathematical physics, in particular operator algebras and quantum probability. He has been professor of mathematics at the Technische Universität Darmstadt since 2002.

== Education and career ==
Kümmerer was born in Tübingen and studied mathematics at the University of Tübingen, where he received his diploma in 1979, his doctorate in 1982 and his habilitation in 1987. He subsequently held teaching and research positions at several European institutions, including King's College London and Heidelberg University. In 1997 he was appointed associate professor at the University of Stuttgart, and in 2002 he became professor of mathematics at TU Darmstadt.

== Research ==
Kümmerer's research lies in the fields of operator algebras and quantum probability. His work includes the mathematical aspects of quantum scattering theory, on which he collaborated with the Dutch mathematical physicist Hans Maassen. Together they wrote the survey Elements of Quantum Probability (1998). In 2008 the two co-organised a session of the programme Mathematical Horizons for Quantum Physics at the Institute for Mathematical Sciences of the National University of Singapore.

== Teaching and public outreach ==
At TU Darmstadt, Kümmerer is affiliated with the mathematics education (Didaktik) group. He has received several awards for his teaching and research, and is active in communicating mathematics to schools and the general public through lectures and exhibitions. An example is his 2008 public lecture on knot theory, Knot or not Knot?, at the National University of Singapore.
