= Russian Trading System =

Stock market

- Type: Stock market
- Location: Moscow, Russia
- Founded: 1995
- Closed: 2011
- Currency: Russian ruble
- Website: rts.ru

The Russian Trading System (RTS; Russian: Фондовая биржа РТС) was a stock market that operated in Moscow from 1995 to 2011. It was established in September 1995 to consolidate various regional trading floors into one exchange. In December 2011 it merged with Moscow Interbank Currency Exchange (MICEX), creating Moscow Exchange. Originally RTS was modeled on NASDAQ's trading and settlement software; in 1998 the exchange went on line with its own in-house system. Initially created as a non-profit organisation, it was transformed into a joint-stock company.

== RTS Index ==
The RTS Index (RTSI) was first calculated on September 1, 1995. It is now the official indicator of Moscow Exchange. The RTSI is a capitalization-weighted composite index calculated based on prices of the 50 most liquid Russian stocks. The Index is calculated in real time and denominated in US dollars.

The RTS Index (RTSI) reached its highest point at 2,498.10 on 19 May 2008 (closing price: 2,487.92), which was during the 2008 financial crisis.

== History ==
In 1995, market professionals established the "Non-Profit Partnership for the Development of the Financial Market (NPF RTS)" to create a platform for organizing and regulating over-the-counter trading of securities. This marked the creation of the classical RTS stock market.

The main principles of trading on the classical market include the ability to enter into transactions, choose currency, method, and timing of settlements. Trading is based on non-anonymous quotes without prior deposit (without transfer to collateral storage) of securities and funds, allowing for trading a wide range of securities.

Based on prices formed on the classical stock market, the RTS Index has been calculated since 1995, becoming (alongside the MOEX Russia Index) one of the main indicators of the Russian stock market. The RTS Index is calculated based on quotes for 50 securities of the most capitalized Russian companies.

In early 2000, RTS received a stock exchange license.

In February 2001, the RTS Board system was launched — an information system of the RTS Stock Exchange designed for indicative quoting of securities not admitted to trading on the RTS. RTS Board includes quotes for almost 2,000 securities from over 1,000 issuers.

In September 2001, the futures and options market FORTS (Futures and Options on RTS) was launched. This is the RTS futures market for trading derivative financial instruments. The use of delivery futures on stocks, settlement futures, and futures options allows investors to implement various strategies: speculative operations, risk hedging, arbitrage, and effective management of a portfolio of individual stocks or with the help of a futures on the RTS Index.

In 2004, according to new regulations for exchange business, RTS was transformed into a joint-stock company.

On November 15, 2005, an anonymous electronic trading mode was launched. The most liquid stocks of the classical RTS market are traded here.

In 2007, a platform for small and medium-sized companies, RTS START, began operating.

In 2008, the RTS Global project was launched.

In March 2008, the Da Vinci Capital fund managed by Oleg Jelesko invested in the RTS Exchange. By the fall of 2011, the fund became the largest shareholder of the exchange, increasing its stake to 15%. In addition, the team from Da Vinci Capital was directly involved in negotiations for a merger with the Moscow Interbank Currency Exchange (MICEX).

In May 2008, RTS initiated the creation of JSC "Ukrainian Exchange" — a joint project with Ukrainian securities traders. The goal was to simplify access to the Ukrainian stock market and to compete with the Ukrainian Stock Exchange (PFTS). On March 26, 2009, the "Ukrainian Exchange" announced the start of trading in securities. The exchange trading system for the first time in Ukraine allows individuals to participate directly in trading using online trading systems.

On May 26, 2008, an evening trading session was introduced on the FORTS futures and options market. The main trading session ends at 18:45 MSK, followed by a clearing session until 19:00 MSK. The evening session continues from 19:00 MSK to 23:50 MSK. Settlements for transactions concluded during this period are made during the intermediate clearing session from 14:00 to 14:03 MSK the next trading day.

In February 2009, the exchange was rebranded.

On March 26, 2009, trading began at the "Eurasian Trading System" JSC (ETS) in Almaty (Kazakhstan). The first product launched into circulation was third-grade wheat. Currently, the traded commodities on ETS include wheat, rye, barley, and sunflower seeds.

On April 23, 2009, trading began on the new ruble stock market RTS Standard. Trading is conducted on the 20 most liquid securities of Russian issuers.

On December 19, 2011, a record was entered into the Unified State Register of Legal Entities (USRLE) about the termination of the activities of JSC "RTS," and the Charter of the Open Joint Stock Company "MICEX-RTS" in the new edition was registered by the registering authority. A deal was made to merge JSC "RTS" and CJSC MICEX (now JSC "Moscow Exchange").
