= RTS Index =

Russian stock market index

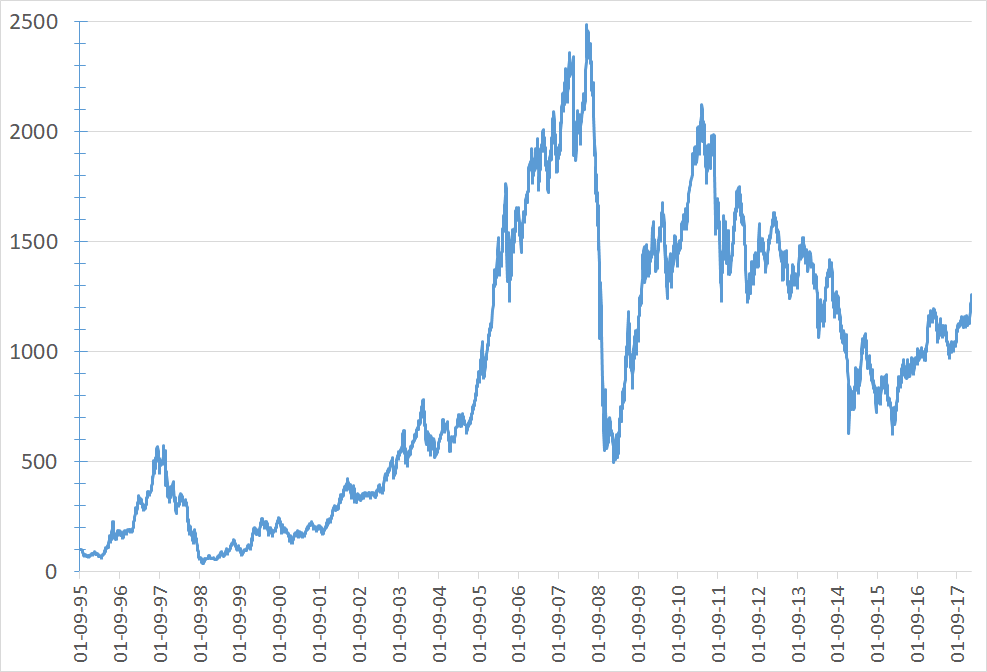
RTS Index from September 1995 to January 2018

The RTS Index (RTSI; Russian: Индекс РТС) is a free-float capitalization-weighted index of 50 Russian stocks traded on the Moscow Exchange, calculated in US dollars. The index was introduced on September 1, 1995, with the formation of the Russian Trading System (RTS) stock exchange, which later merged with Moscow Interbank Currency Exchange (MICEX) to form the Moscow Exchange.

The RTS Index was introduced with a base value of 100. It is calculated in a real-time mode. The list of stocks is reviewed every three months. The RTSI peaked on 19 May 2008 at 2,498.10 points, and fell to 492.59 on 23 January 2009.

In addition to the RTS Index, Moscow Exchange also computes and publishes the RTS Standard Index (RTSSTD), RTS-2 Index, RTS Siberia Index and seven sectoral indices (Telecommunication, Financial, Metals & Mining, Oil & Gas, Industrial, Consumer & Retail, and Electric Utilities). The RTS Standard and RTS-2 are compiled similarly to the RTS Index, from a list of top 15 large-cap stocks and 50+ second-tier stocks, respectively.

== Annual returns ==
The following table shows the annual development of the RTS Index since 1995.

Year	Closing level	Change in Index in points	Change in Index in %
1995	82.92		
1996	200.50	117.58	141.80
1997	396.86	196.36	97.94
1998	58.93	−337.93	−85.15
1999	175.26	116.33	197.40
2000	143.29	−31.97	−18.24
2001	260.05	116.76	81.49
2002	359.07	99.02	38.08
2003	567.25	208.18	57.98
2004	614.11	46.86	8.26
2005	1,125.60	511.49	83.29
2006	1,921.92	796.32	70.75
2007	2,290.51	368.59	19.18
2008	631.89	−1,658.62	−72.41
2009	1,444.61	812.72	128.62
2010	1.770.26	325.65	22.54
2011	1,380.49	−389.77	−22.02
2012	1,530.41	149.92	10.61
2013	1,442.73	−87.68	−5.73
2014	790.71	−652.02	−45.19
2015	757.04	−33.67	−4.26
2016	1,152.33	395.29	52.22
2017	1,154.43	2.10	0.18
2018	1,066.13	−88.30	−7.65
2019	1,548.92	482.79	45.82
2020	1,387.46	−161.46	−10.42
2021	1,595.76	208.30	15.01
2022	970.60	−625.16	−39.18
2023	1,083.47	112.87	11.63

== Components ==
From September 22, 2017 the composition of the RTS Index is the following:

Company	Ticker symbol	Stock type	Industry
AFK Sistema	AFKS	Common	Conglomerate
Aeroflot	AFLT	Common	Transportation
Rusagro	AGRO	Depositary receipt	Agriculture
Acron	AKRN	Common	Chemicals
Lenta	LNTA	Depositary receipt	Retail
Credit Bank of Moscow	CBOM	Common	Banking
Detsky Mir	DSKY	Common	Retail
SeverStal	CHMF	Common	Mining & Metallurgy
DIXY	DIXY	Common	Retail
FGC UES	FEES	Common	Electric utility
Gazprom	GAZP	Common	Oil & gas
Norilsk Nickel	GMKN	Common	Mining & Metallurgy
RusHydro	HYDR	Common	Energy
Inter RAO	IRAO	Common	Energy
Lukoil	LKOH	Common	Oil & gas
LSR Group	LSRG	Common	Real estate development
Magnitogorsk Iron and Steel Works	MAGN	Common	Metallurgy
MegaFon	MFON	Common	Telecommunication
OJSC Magnit	MGNT	Common	Retail
Moscow Exchange	MOEX	Common	Stock exchange
Mosenergo	MSNG	Common	Energy
Mechel	MTLR	Common	Mining & Metallurgy
Alrosa	ALRS	Common	Mining
Mobile TeleSystems	MTSS	Common	Telecommunication
M.video	MVID	Common	Retail
Novolipetsk Steel	NLMK	Common	Metallurgy
Novorossiysk Commercial Sea Port	NMPT	Common	Transportation
Novatek	NVTK	Common	Oil & gas
PhosAgro	PHOR	Common	Chemicals
PIK Group	PIKK	Common	Real estate development
Polyus Gold	PLZL	Common	Mining
Polymetal International	POLY	Common	Mining
Rosneft	ROSN	Common	Oil & gas
Rosseti	RSTI	Common	Electric utility
Rostelecom	RTKM	Common	Telecommunication
Rusal	RUALR	Russian depositary receipt (RDR)	Mining
SFI	EPLN	Common	Leasing
Sberbank	SBER	Common	Banking
Sberbank	SBERP	Preferred	Banking
Surgutneftegas	SNGS	Common	Oil & gas
Surgutneftegas	SNGSP	Preferred	Oil & gas
Tatneft	TATN	Common	Oil & gas
Tatneft	TATNP	Preferred	Oil & gas
OAO TMK	TRMK	Common	Steel industry
Transneft	TRNFP	Preferred	Oil & gas
Unipro	UPRO	Common	Electric utility
Russneft	RNFT	Common	Refining
United Wagon Company	UWGN	Common	Mechanical engineering
VTB Bank	VTBR	Common	Banking
Yandex	YNDX	Common	Internet

== See also ==
- MOEX Russia Index
