= Moscow Interbank Currency Exchange =

Russian stock market index

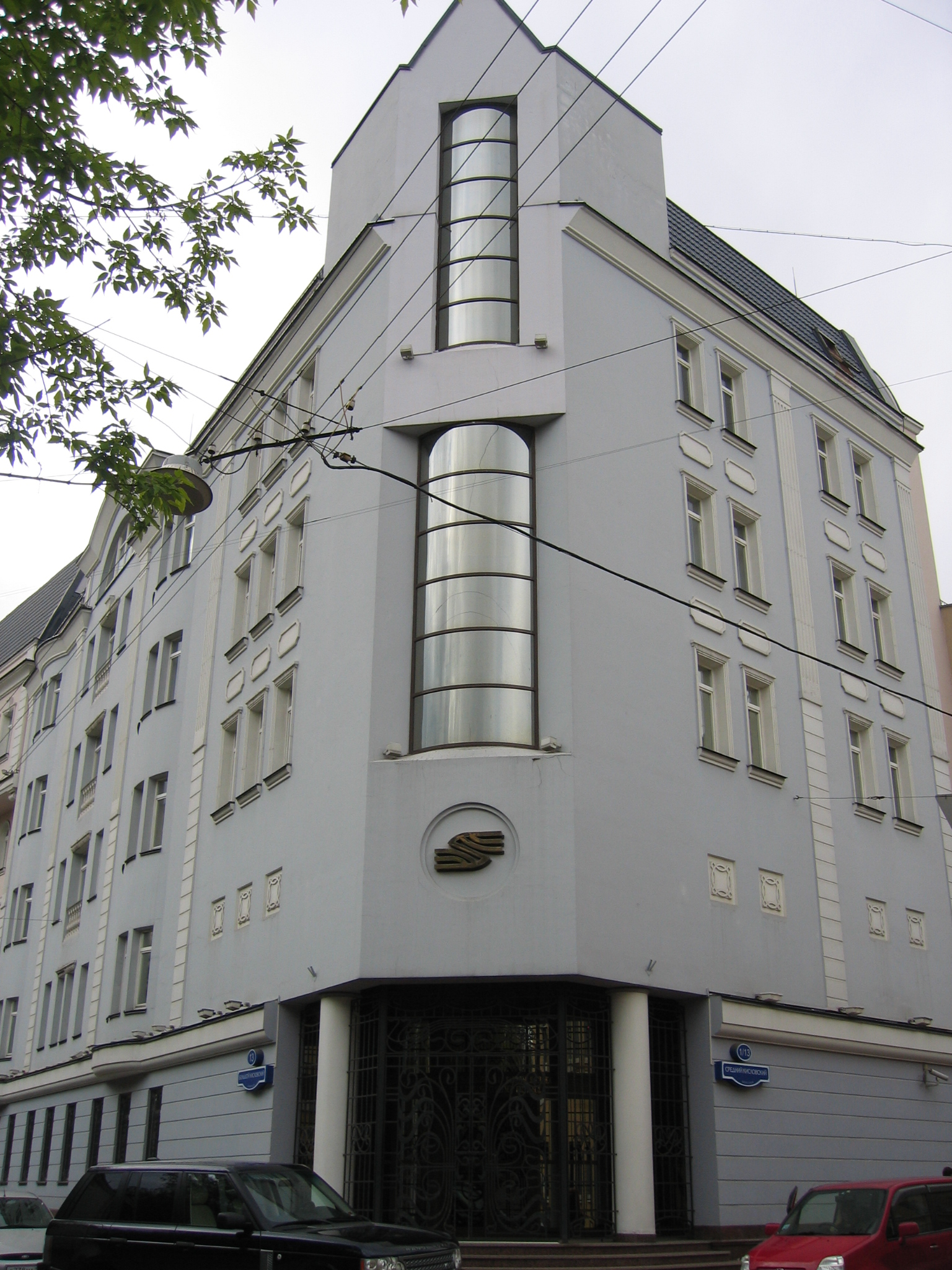
- Type: Stock exchange
- Location: Moscow, Russia
- Founded: 1992
- Closed: 2011
- Owner: MICEX Group
- Key people: Ruben Aganbegyan (President)
- Currency: Russian ruble
- No. of listings: 250
- Market cap: US$770.6 billion (Dec 2011)
- Indices: MICEX Index
- Website: www.micex.com

The Moscow Interbank Currency Exchange (Russian: Московская межбанковская валютная биржа) or MICEX (Russian: ММВБ) was a stock exchange that operated in Russia from 1992 to 2011. MICEX was the leading Russian stock exchange and one of the largest universal stock exchanges in Eastern Europe. It merged with the Russian Trading System in 2011, creating Moscow Exchange.

MICEX consisted of about 550 participating organizations and members, which traded for their clients. In 2006 the volume of transactions on the MICEX reached 20.38 trillion rubles (US$754.9 billion), representing more than 90% of the total turnover of the leading stock exchanges in the Russian stock market. About 239 Russian companies were listed, with a market capitalization of US$950 billion as of December 2010.

== History ==
MICEX started with currency auctions in November 1989 as an initiative by the Foreign trade and investment bank of the USSR. Thus, for the first time the market ruble exchange rate to dollar was established. In January 1992 it became the main platform for carrying out currency transactions for banks and enterprises.

Until July 1992 the rate in the Moscow Interbank Stock Exchange was used by the Central Bank for the official quotation of ruble to foreign currencies. In the mid-1990s preparation for trading corporate securities and futures began.

On 19 December 2011, MICEX merged with the Russian Trading System to form a single entity known as MICEX-RTS that was expected to become a leading stock exchange globally for trading across asset classes and to advance Russia's plans to turn Moscow into an international financial centre. The goals of the merger included the optimisation of the Russian stock market, the reduction of the number of organisations with overlapping functions, the creation of a single platform for issuers, traders and investors, the reduction of transaction costs, and easier trading.

Problems in merging the infrastructure resulted in computer errors in trades, something that had not happened on the merged exchanges for a decade: on the first day of trades, there was a short period of computer glitches when the clearing system malfunctioned, which resulted in registering multiple unsanctioned deals, with some traders suffering losses.

A new brand for the united exchange was unveiled in the first half of 2012.

== Chairman of the Board of Directors ==
From 2009 until 2012, Bella Ilyinichna (also tranliterated Ilinichna) Zlatkis (Russian: Белла Ильинична Златкис) was chairman of the board of directors. (Note: From 27 May 2004 until 20 September 2022, Bella Ilyinichna Zlatkis or also transliterated as Bella Ilinichna Zlatkis (Russian: Белла Ильинична Златкис; born 5 July 1948, Moscow) was a Deputy Chairman of the Executive Board of Sberbank. From December 1992, Zlatkis was on the Attestation Commission (Russian: Аттестационная комиссия) of the Goskomimushchestvo (Russian: «Госкомимущество»). From 2009 until 2012, Zlatkis was the chairman of the board of directors of MICEX, and, since 2011, she has been a member of the Board of Directors of MICEX-RTS which is known as the Moscow Exchange since 19 December 2011. On 8 May 2022, she was sanctioned by the Office of Foreign Assets Control of the United States Department of the Treasury.)
