= Moscow Exchange =

Stock exchange in Moscow, Russia

Coordinates: 55°45′19″N 37°36′22″E

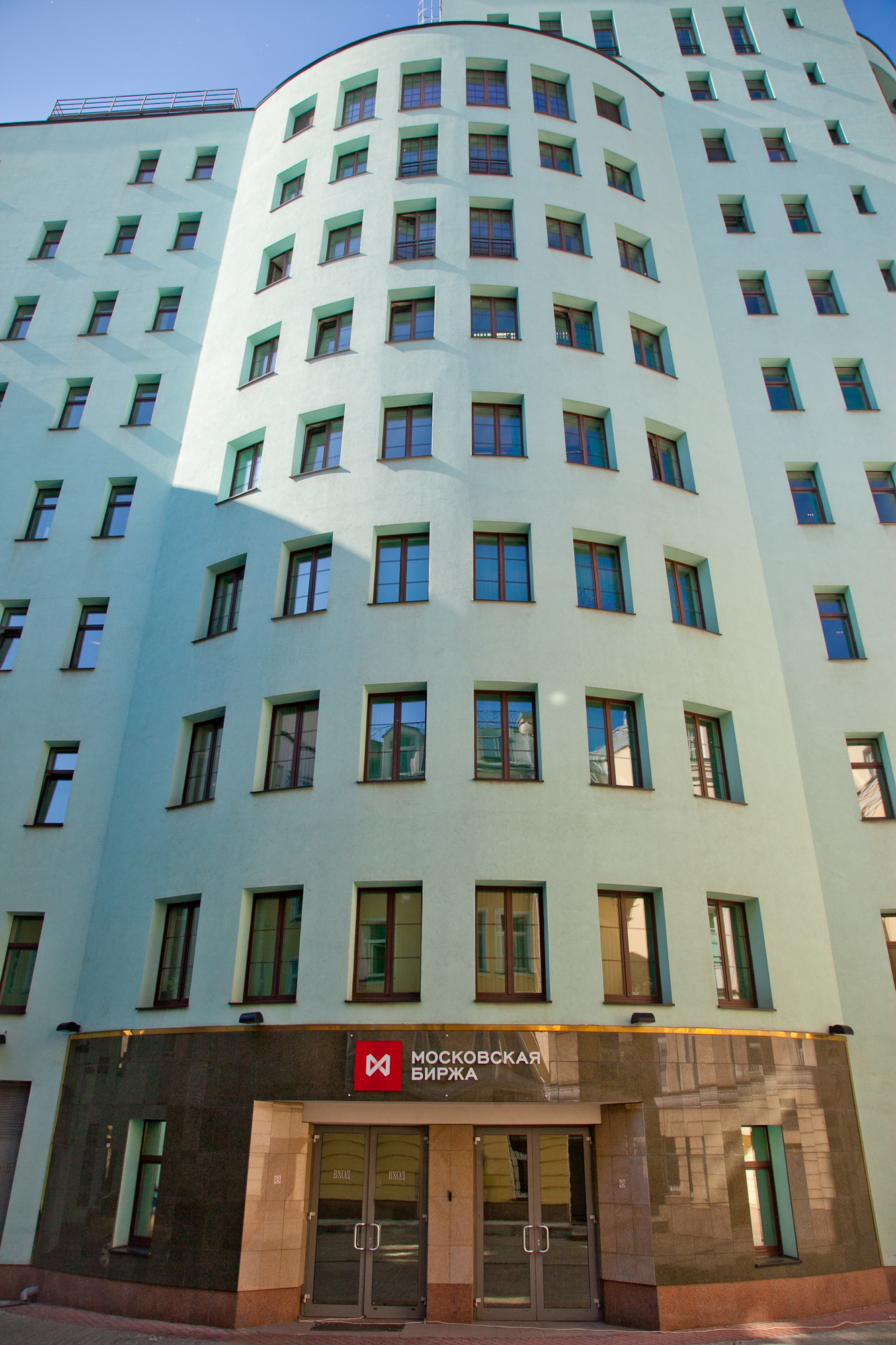
- Type: Stock exchange, futures exchange, FX exchange
- Location: Moscow, Russia
- Founded: 19 December 2011; 14 years ago
- Owner: Public company
- Key people: Yury Denisov (CEO)
- Currency: Russian ruble
- No. of listings: 219
- Market cap: US$ $773 billion
- Indices: MOEX Russia Index, RTS Index
- Website: moex.com/en/

The Moscow Exchange (MOEX; Russian: Московская биржа, romanized: Moskovskaya birzha, IPA: [mɐˈskofskəjə ˈbʲirʐə]) is the largest exchange in Russia, operating trading markets in equities, bonds, derivatives, the foreign exchange market, money markets, and precious metals. The Moscow Exchange also operates Russia's central securities depository, the National Settlement Depository (NSD), and the country's largest clearing service provider, the National Clearing Centre. The exchange was formed in 2011 in a merger of the Moscow Interbank Currency Exchange and the Russian Trading System.

At the end of 2025, the total trading volume on MOEX platforms reached 1.6 quadrillion rubles (about $22.4 trillion).

== History ==
The Moscow Exchange was established on 19 December 2011 by merging the two largest Moscow-based exchanges, the Moscow Interbank Currency Exchange (MICEX) and the Russian Trading System (RTS), hence the name "Moscow Exchange MICEX-RTS". Both organisations had been formed in the 1990s and were leading Russian exchanges for two decades with their MICEX Index and the RTS Index. The merger created a single entity to support Russia's plans to turn Moscow into an international financial centre.

The exchange completed an initial public offering on 15 February 2013, raising 15 billion ₽ (approximately US$500 million). The offering, at the time the largest ever held exclusively in Moscow, was more than twice oversubscribed and drew demand from institutional investors globally. The exchange's shares were included in the MSCI Russia Index in November 2013. In July 2014 the Central Bank of Russia, the largest shareholder of the exchange, completed the public sale of shares representing nearly 12% of the exchange. A Russian federal law requires the Central Bank to fully sell its stake in the exchange by 1 January 2016. In April 2015, the Central Bank of Russia saw it was inexpedient to completely withdraw from the OJSC Moscow Exchange capital and CJSC SPCEX. So, they made a new proposal to the Russian Ministry of Finance. In October 2018, Moscow Exchange launched the trading of deliverable gold futures on its Derivatives Market. Gold are delivered through precious metals market spot section.

On 24 February 2022, following the start of the Russian invasion of Ukraine, the Moscow Exchange suspended trading until further notice. On 27 February, TASS reported that foreign clients were banned from selling any securities, effective immediately.

On 4 March, the exchange was suspended from the World Federation of Exchanges.

On 18 March it was announced that trading in OFZ bonds should be resumed on 21 March. On 23 March, it was announced that trading of 33 ruble securities would resume on 24 March for residents of Russia, but that foreign investors were being restricted to repo deals and deals with derivative instruments. It was also announced that the act of short selling would be banned. On 26 March, it was announced that limited trading would be expanded to all stocks in a shortened four-hour session on 28 March. In August 2022, the bourse still hadn't fully returned to normal operations. It remains unclear if, and if so when, normal operations did or will resume.

The exchange was also targeted as part of international sanctions against Russia. On May 5, the United Kingdom revoked the exchange's status as a UK "recognized stock exchange", thereby depriving securities traded on the exchange of certain UK tax reliefs.

== Management ==
The Executive Board consists of five members:

- Yury Denisov, CEO since 2019 and a past supervisory board member
- Andrey Selyuk, chief financial officer since 2022
- Andrey Burilov, chief information officer since 2020,
- Igor Marich, Managing Director of Sales & Business Development and a 20-year veteran of Moscow Exchange,
- Dmitry Shcheglov, chief operating officer, a veteran of Moscow Exchange and its predecessor MICEX.

For 2020-2021 the board consisted of the following members:

- Oleg Vyugin (chairman), an economist and former head of the Russian financial markets regulator
- Andrey Golikov, board member at National Clearing Centre
- Maria Gordon, a former emerging markets portfolio manager at Goldman Sachs and PIMCO
- Valery Goreglyad, chief auditor of the Bank of Russia
- Bella Zlatkis, deputy chairman of the management board at Sberbank and former deputy finance minister of Russia
- Vadim Kulik, deputy president of VTB Bank
- Maxim Krasnykh, global chief operating officer at Gett
- Paul Bodart, former CEO of BNY Mellon Europe
- Ramon Adarraga, former executive chairman of Bolsas y Mercados Españoles Market Data
- Alexander Izosimov, former CEO of Vympelcom
- Oskar Hartmann, co-founder of Fast Lane Ventures and a board member of Alfa-Bank

== Shareholders ==
Moscow Exchange's shares are publicly traded under the ticker MOEX. As of December 2021 approximately 63% of shares were in the free float, while the following held blocks of shares: Central Bank of Russia (11.75%), Sberbank (9.9%), Vnesheconombank (8.4%), European Bank for Reconstruction and Development (6.1%) and US asset management firm Capital Research and Management Company, which manages more than $1.3 trillion globally in retirement assets. In total, US investors owned 36.8% of the shares of Moscow Exchange, and UK investors owned 10.1%. Additionally, 360,000 Russian retail investors owned MOEX shares.

== Trading markets ==
=== Equity & Bond Market ===
The Equity & Bond Market is a key platform for Russian businesses to raise capital and for domestic and international investors to access equity and debt investment opportunities. It is the main trading venue for Russian stocks as well as government, municipal, and corporate bonds. In 2013–2014, 16 companies placed stock via Moscow Exchange, raising a total of approximately RUB 200 bln. On the fixed income side, more than 400 bond issues were placed, raising more than RUB 3.4 trillion for issuers.

Moscow Exchange includes shares of many of Russia's largest companies, including Gazprom, Sberbank, Rosneft, Lukoil and VTB.

Global investment banks began to provide their clients with DMA to the Russian market in 2013. As a result of regulatory changes, the international central securities depositories Euroclear Bank and Clearstream Banking SA offered clearance and settlement services for Russian stocks and bonds.

In addition, Moscow Exchange focused on further developing the domestic investor base. The number of individuals with brokerage accounts on Moscow Exchange reached 17 million as of January 2022, which represented 11% of Russia's population.

=== Foreign Exchange and money market ===
The Bank of Russia uses the Exchange's infrastructure to implement monetary policy and provide liquidity to the market through repo transactions and FX swap transactions. For its domestic and international clients, including banks and corporates, Moscow Exchange offers products to manage liquidity and FX exposure. It is the centre of pricing for RUB and offers many RUB currency pairs, with tight spreads based on a transparent order book.

All transactions (spot and swap) on the FX market are centrally cleared by National Clearing Centre. In September 2014, average daily trading volume across all currency pairs was US$22.4 bln.

While RUB/USD and RUB/EUR were the most traded currency pairs in 2014, Moscow Exchange also promoted trading in other currencies. In particular the RUB/CNY pair was well received by the market and trading in the GBP and HKD were launched in late 2014.

=== Derivatives market ===
Moscow Exchange as of 2014 was one of the 10 largest exchange platforms for derivatives trading globally. The Derivatives Market facilitates trading of options contracts on, as well as futures contracts on indices, shares of both Russian and foreign companies, currency pairs, precious metals, energy and agricultural products.

Futures on the RTS Index ranked sixth among the world's most actively traded derivatives on stock market indices according to data from the Futures Industry Association as of June 2014. Futures contracts on the U.S. dollar-Russian ruble were ranked first on 2014 in global liquidity, according to the Futures Industry Association.

As of October 2014, 58 types of futures and 18 types of options were traded on the Exchange.

=== Commodities markets ===
==== Precious metals trading ====
Moscow Exchange introduced spot trading in gold and silver in 2013. It has postponed a launch of trade in platinum and palladium by end of October or early November 2014 in order to do additional testing of the trading and clearing system.

==== Grain trading ====
National Mercantile Exchange is Russia's platform for spot grain trading, as well as in deliverable futures on agricultural products. Since 2002, National Mercantile Exchange has been the platform by which the Russian state executes interventions in the grain market.

== Post-trade services, subsidiaries National Settlement Depository and National Clearing Centre ==
Moscow Exchange subsidiary National Settlement Depository (NSD) was granted status as Russia's Central Securities Depository in 2012. Subsequently, Euroclear Bank and Clearstream Banking SA opened accounts with the NSD, allowing international investors access to Russian bonds and equities, and giving Russian issuers access to non-Russian investors.

In the wake of the 2022 Russian invasion of Ukraine, NSD blocked and froze all securities held in Euroclear's account at NSD, on March 1, 2022. NSD also froze payments on securities of Russian issuers from being made to non-Russian individuals and entities. On March 18, 2022, NSD's accounts at Euroclear and Clearstream (which together held €50tn of assets on behalf of investors) were blocked and frozen. In March 2022, the European Central Securities Depositories Association (ECSDA) suspended NSD from membership in the association. In addition, the European Union added NSD to its extended sanctions list, blocking NSD's accounts in euros and in Euroclear and Clearstream and making it impossible to service forex-denominated bonds issued by Russia and Russian companies, and the NSD suspended transactions in euros.

Another Moscow Exchange subsidiary, National Clearing Centre (NCC), is Russia's largest clearing center and is the Central Counterparty (CCP) across all Moscow Exchange markets. In reaction to the 2022 Russian invasion of Ukraine, the European Association of CCP Clearing Houses (EACH) suspended National Clearing Centre from EACH membership.

== See also ==
- Russian Trading System Stock Exchange historic, merged 2011
- Moscow Interbank Currency Exchange historic, merged 2011
- Moscow International Business Center, a commercial district in Moscow
