= MOEX Russia Index =

Russian stock market index

Graph of MOEX Russia Index from inception to November 2025

The MOEX Russia Index (Russian: Индекс МосБиржи), formerly the MICEX Index, is the main ruble-denominated benchmark of the Russian stock market. It was established by the Moscow Interbank Currency Exchange (MICEX) on 22 September 1997. MICEX merged with the Russian Trading System to form Moscow Exchange (MOEX) in 2011 and the index was renamed to MOEX Russia Index on 27 November 2017.

It has the same composition as the RTS Index, which is denominated in U.S. dollars. The MOEX Russia Index is traditionally favored by domestic investors, while foreign investors prefer the RTS Index. The number of component stocks is variable, and depends on liquidity and trading frequency.
