= List of companies of Russia =

Russia has a high-income mixed economy with state ownership in strategic areas of the economy. Market reforms in the 1990s privatized much of Russian industry and agriculture, with notable exceptions to this privatization occurring in the energy and defense-related sectors.

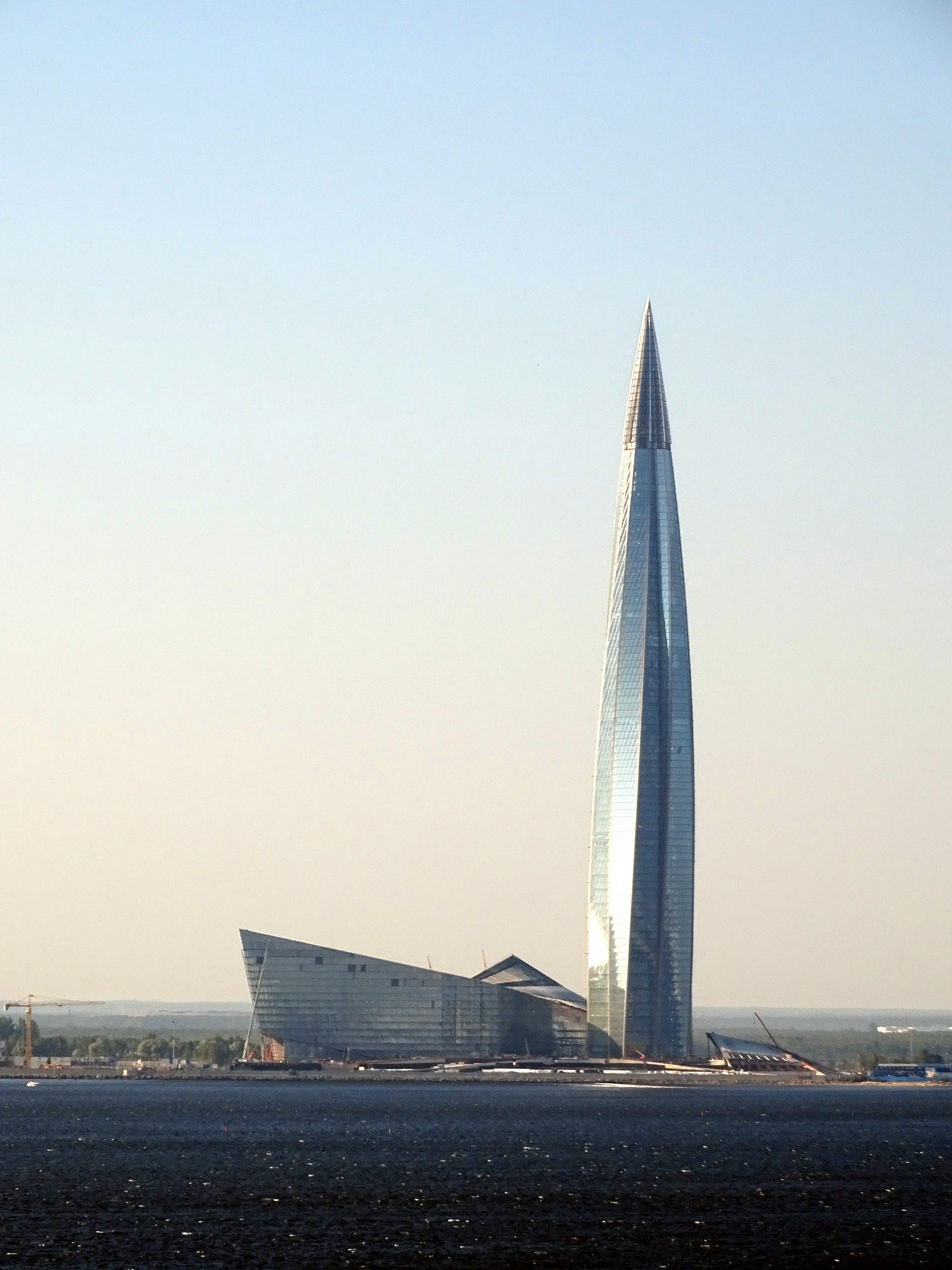
Gazprom's headquarters in the Lakhta Center in Saint Petersburg. Gazprom is the largest company in Russia

Russia's vast geography is an important determinant of its economic activity, with some sources estimating that Russia contains over 30 percent of the world's natural resources. The World Bank estimates the total value of Russia's natural resources at US$75 trillion. Russia relies on energy revenues to drive most of its growth. Russia has an abundance of petroleum, natural gas and precious metals, which make up a major share of Russia's exports. As of 2012 the oil-and-gas sector accounted for 16% of the GDP, 52% of federal budget revenues and over 70% of total exports.

== Largest firms ==
Active firms
State-owned firms
Defunct firms

Rank	Name	Industry	Revenue (USD billions)	Headquarters	Ref(s)
1	Gazprom	Oil and gas	112.2	St Petersburg	
2	Lukoil	Oil and gas	93.84	Moscow	
3	Rosneft	Oil and gas	86.21	Moscow	
4	Sberbank	Finance	53.7	Moscow	
5	Russian Railways	Transport	38.6	Moscow	
—	Rostec	Investments	27.24	Moscow	
6	VTB Bank	Finance	22.8	Moscow	
7	X5 Group	Trade	22.2	Moscow	
8	Surgutneftegas	Oil and gas	19.81	Surgut	
9	Magnit	Trade	19.59	Krasnodar	
10	Rosseti	Power engineering	16.25	Moscow	
11	Inter RAO	Power engineering	15.72	Moscow	
12	Transneft	Oil and gas	14.64	Moscow	
13	Rosatom	Atomic industry	19.65	Moscow	
—	Sistema	Investments	12.08	Moscow	
14	Tatneft	Oil and gas	11.67	Almetyevsk	
15	Megapolis Group	Distribution	11.24	Moscow	
16	Gazprombank	Finance	10.92	Moscow	
17	Evraz	Metals and mining	10.83	Moscow	
18	Novolipetsk Steel	Metals and mining	10.06	Moscow	
19	Novatek	Oil and gas	9.99	Moscow	
20	Sibur	Chemistry and petrochemistry	9.99	Moscow	
21	Rusal	Metals and mining	9.98	Moscow	
22	Norilsk Nickel	Metals and mining	9.2	Moscow	
23	Aeroflot	Transport	9.14	Moscow	
24	Severstal	Metals and mining	7.85	Cherepovets	
25	United Aircraft Corporation	Defense and machine building	7.75	Moscow	
26	Mobile TeleSystems	Telecommunications	7.59	Moscow	
27	Magnitogorsk Iron and Steel Works	Metals and mining	7.54	Magnitogorsk	
28	Ural Mining and Metallurgical Company	Metals and mining	7.13	Verkhnyaya Pyshma	
29	RusHydro	Power engineering	6.53	Moscow	
30	MegaFon	Telecommunications	6.39	Moscow	
31	Lenta	Trade	6.26	St. Petersburg	
32	Metalloinvest	Metals and mining	6.24	Moscow	
33	Stroygazmontazh	Construction of infrastructure	6.2	Moscow	
34	T Plus	Power engineering	6.08	Krasnogorsk	
35	VimpelCom	Telecommunications	5.84	Moscow	
36	SUEK	Metals and mining	5.69	Moscow	
37	United Shipbuilding Corporation	Defense and machine building	5.59	Moscow	
38	Sakhalin Energy	Oil and gas	5.4	Yuzhno-Sakhalinsk	
39	Rostelecom	Telecommunications	5.23	Moscow	
40	Alfa-Bank	Finance	5.12	Moscow	
41	Otkritie Holding	Finance	5.12	Moscow	
42	Mechel	Metals and mining	5.12	Moscow	
43	Vnesheconombank	Finance	5.12	Moscow	
—	Auchan Russia	Trade	5.04	France	
—	Japan Tobacco International Russia	Alcohol and tobacco	4.95	Japan	
44	EuroChem	Chemistry and petrochemistry	4.87	Moscow	
45	DIXY	Trade	4.85	Moscow	
—	Philip Morris Sales and Marketing Russia	Alcohol and tobacco	4.73	United States	
46	Alrosa	Metals and mining	4.71	Moscow	
47	Rosselkhozbank	Finance	4.61	Moscow	
48	Protek	Pharmaceuticals	4.42	Moscow	
49	OAO TMK	Metals and mining	4.39	Moscow	
50	Russian Helicopters	Defense and machine building	4.25	Moscow	
51	TNS Energo	Power engineering	4.18	Moscow	
52	Katren	Pharmaceuticals	4.17	Khimki	
53	Slavneft	Oil and gas	4.13	Moscow	
54	United Engine Corporation	Defense and machine building	4.03	Moscow	
—	Metro Cash & Carry Russia	Trade	3.98	Germany	
—	Leroy Merlin Russia	Trade	3.89	France	
55	AvtoVAZ	Cars	3.87	Tolyatti	
56	New Stream Group	Oil and gas	3.77	Moscow	
57	Merlion	Distribution	3.77	Krasnogorsk	
58	Avtotor	Cars	3.7	Moscow	
59	Tactical Missiles Corporation	Defense and machine building	3.62	Korolyov	
60	Red&White	Trade	3.6	Chelyabinsk	
61	Mostotrest	Construction of infrastructure	3.57	Moscow	
—	MUMT (British American Tobacco)	Alcohol and tobacco	3.45	United Kingdom	
62	M.video	Trade	3.39	Moscow	
63	DNS Group	Trade	3.39	Vladivostok	
64	PhosAgro	Chemistry and petrochemistry	3.1	Moscow	
65	Rolf Group	Cars	3.09	Moscow	
66	O'Key Group	Trade	3.03	Moscow	
67	Independent Oil and Gas Company	Oil and gas	3.03	Moscow	
68	PIK Group	Development and construction	3	Moscow	
69	EuroSibEnergo	Power engineering	2.97	Moscow	
70	Russian Post	Postal services	2.95	Moscow	
71	Nizhnekamskneftekhim	Chemistry and petrochemistry	2.88	Nizhnekamsk	
72	Rusenergosbyt	Power engineering	2.85	Moscow	
73	United Metallurgical Company	Metals and mining	2.85	Moscow	
74	GAZ Group	Cars	2.83	Nizhny Novgorod	
75	Tashir	Development and construction	2.81	Moscow	
76	SNS Holding	Distribution	2.78	Moscow	
77	National Computer Corporation	Information Technology	2.76	Moscow	
78	Uralkali	Chemistry and petrochemistry	2.76	Moscow	
79	TAIF-NK	Oil and gas	2.73	Nizhnekamsk	
80	Polyus	Metals and mining	2.73	Moscow	
81	United Company Eurobusiness Euroset	Trade	2.71	Moscow	
82	Chelyabinsk Pipe Rolling Plant	Metals and mining	2.71	Chelyabinsk	
83	Sodrugestvo	Agriculture and Food	2.67	Svetly	
84	SOGAZ	Finance	2.67	Moscow	
85	KamAZ	Cars	2.67	Naberezhnye Chelny	
86	Transmashholding	Defense and machine building	2.67	Moscow	
87	StroyTransNefteGaz (formerly Stroytransgaz)	Construction of infrastructure	2.64	St. Petersburg	
88	FC Pulse	Pharmaceuticals	2.57	Khimki	
89	Zarubezhneft	Oil and gas	2.54	Moscow	
90	Arktikgaz	Oil and gas	2.52	Novy Urengoy	
91	Tomskneft	Oil and gas	2.45	Strezhevoy	
92	UCL Holding	Transport	2.45	Moscow	
93	Credit Bank of Moscow	Finance	2.43	Moscow	
94	LSR Group	Development and construction	2.37	St. Petersburg	
95	Mosinzhproekt	Development and construction	2.35	Moscow	
96	Major Group	Cars	2.33	Moscow	
97	ForteInvest	Oil and gas	2.3	Moscow	
98	Irkutsk Oil Company	Oil and gas	2.26	Irkutsk	
99	Uralvagonzavod	Defense and machine building	2.23	Nizhny Tagil	
100	RussNeft	Oil and gas	2.21	Moscow	

== Notable firms ==
This list includes notable companies with primary headquarters located in the country. The industry and sector follow the Industry Classification Benchmark taxonomy. Organizations which have ceased operations are included and noted as defunct.

Active firms
State-owned firms
Defunct firms

Name	Russian	Industry	Sector	Headquarters	Founded	Notes
1C Company	Фирма "1С"	Technology	Software	Moscow	1991	Education, video games, business software
Abrau-Durso		Consumer goods	Food & beverage	Abrau-Dyurso	1870	Brewers, wines maker
Acron Group	Акрон	Basic materials	Chemicals	Nizhny Novgorod	1961	Fertilizers
Aeroflot	Аэрофлот	Consumer services	Airline	Moscow	1923	Flag-carrier airline
Ak Bars Bank		Financials	Banks	Kazan	1993	
Ak Bars Holding		Conglomerate		Kazan	1998	Agriculture, banks, construction, entertainment, foods, retail, industrials
Akella	Акелла	Technology	Software	Moscow	1993	Defunct 2012
Alawar Entertainment	Компания Alawar Entertainment	Technology	Software	Novosibirsk	1999	Video games
Alfa-Bank		Financials	Banks	Moscow	1990	Owned by Alfa Group
Alfa Group	Альфа-Групп	Conglomerate		Moscow	1989	Banks, retail, insurance, water
Alkon		Consumer goods	Food & beverage	Veliky Novgorod	1897	Brewers, vodka maker
All-Russia State Television and Radio Broadcasting Company (VGTRK)	Всероссийская государственная телевизионная и радиовещательная компания (ВГТРК)	Consumer services	Media	Moscow	1990	State-owned media
Almaz-Antey	Алмаз-Антей	Industrials	Aerospace & defense	Moscow	2002	Defense systems, missiles, artillery, electronics, military equipment
Alrosa	АЛРОСА	Basic materials	Precious metals & minerals	Mirny	1987	Diamonds & gemstones mining
Arktikgaz		Oil & gas	Oil & gas producers	Novy Urengoy	1992	Petroleum, owned by Gazprom Neft
Arnest Group		Conglomerate		Nevinnomyssk	1971	Consumer goods, brewery, aluminium
ASCON	АСКОН	Technology	Software	Saint Petersburg	1989	CAD Software
AST	АСТ	Consumer services	Publishing	Moscow	1993	Books publishing
Atomenergoprom	Атомэнергопром	Utilities	Electricity	Moscow	2007	Nuclear power generation
ATV	АТВ Продакшн	Consumer services	Media	Moscow	1988	Broadcasting & entertainment
Aurora		Consumer services	Airline	Yuzhno-Sakhalinsk	2013	
Aurus Motors	Аурус Моторс	Consumer goods	Automobiles & parts	Moscow	2008	luxury and sports vehicles, owned by NAMI
Aviaconversiya	Авиаконверсия	Industrials	Electronic & electrical equipment	Moscow	1991	Defense electronic countermeasures, Jamming technology
Aviakor	Авиакор	Industrials	Aerospace	Samara	1941	Commercial aircraft & parts manufacturer, owned by Basic Element
Avtotor	Автотор	Consumer goods	Automobiles & parts	Kaliningrad	1996	
AvtoVAZ	АвтоВАЗ	Consumer goods	Automobiles & parts	Tolyatti	1966	Brand Lada, owned by Rostec
Baltika Breweries	Пивоваренная компания Балтика	Consumer goods	Food & beverage	Saint Petersburg	1990	Brewers, part of Carlsberg Group (Denmark)
Bank Rossiya		Financials	Banks	Saint Petersburg	1990	
Bank Saint Petersburg	Банк Санкт-Петербург	Financials	Banks	Saint Petersburg	1990	
Barnaul Cartridge Plant		Industrials	Defense	Barnaul	1941	Ammunition
Basic Element	Ба́зовый элеме́нт	Conglomerate		Moscow	1997	Aviation, construction, energy, financial Services, manufacturing
Bolshevichka	Большевичка	Consumer goods	Clothing and accessories	Moscow	1929	Apparel & accessories
Bork		Consumer goods	Consumer electronics	Moscow	2001	Home appliances, beauty & wellness products
Bryansk Automobile Plant	Брянский автомоби́льный заво́д	Industrials	Commercial vehicles & trucks	Bryansk	1958	Military vehicles, defense, owned by Almaz-Antey
Central Bank of Russia		Financials	Banks	Moscow	1990	Central reserves bank
Channel One	Первый канал	Consumer services	Media	Moscow	1938	Broadcasting & entertainment
Chelyabinsk Pipe Rolling Plant	Группа ЧТПЗ	Basic materials	Iron & steel	Moscow	1942	Iron & steel, nonferrous metals
Chelyabinsk Tractor Plant	Челябинский тракторный завод	Industrials	Agricultural machinery	Chelyabinsk	1933	Tractors, bulldozers, diesel engines, part of Uralvagonzavod
Cherkizovo	Группа „Черки́зово“	Consumer goods	Food & beverage	Moscow	2005	Meat products, poultry and pork
Concern Morinformsystem-Agat	АО Концерн Моринсис-Агат	Industrials	Aerospace & defense	Moscow	1942	Missile systems, electronic equipment
Concern Radio-Electronic Technologies	Концерн Радиоэлектронные технологии	Industrials	Electronic & electrical equipment	Moscow	-	Defense electronics & equipment, owned by Rostec
Concern Tractor Plants	Тракторные заводы	Industrials	Agricultural machinery	Cheboksary	2003	Tractors, owned by Rostec
Credit Bank of Moscow		Financials	Banks	Moscow	1992	Commercial bank
CTC Media	СТС Медиа	Consumer services	Media	Moscow	1989	Broadcasting & entertainment
Dalsvyaz	Дальсвязь	Telecommunications	Fixed line telecommunications	Vladivostok	1994	Defunct 2013, acquired by Rostelecom
Detsky Mir		Consumer services	Retail	Moscow	1990	Children's retail store, owned by Sistema
Dixy		Consumer goods	Retail	Moscow	1992	Supermarkets & hypermarkets chain
E4 Group	Группа Е4	Industrials	Construction & materials	Moscow	2006	Heavy construction
Eksmo	Эксмо	Consumer services	publishing	Moscow	1991	Publishing, specialty retailers
En+ Group	En+ Group	Utilities	Electricity	Moscow	2002	Owned by Basic Element
Enel Russia	Энел Россия	Utilities	Electricity	Ekaterinburg	2004	Formerly OGK-5. Owned by Enel (Italy)
Energia	Королёва	Industrials	Aerospace & defense	Korolyov, Moscow Oblast	1946	Space industry, missiles systems, owned by Roscosmos
ER-Telecom	ЭР-Телеком	Telecommunications	Fixed line telecommunications	Perm	2001	Broadband internet, cable
Eurocement group	Евроцемент груп	Industrials	Construction & materials	Moscow	2002	Cement
Euroset	Евросеть	Consumer services	Retail	Moscow	1997	Defunct 2018
Evalar	Эвалар	Health care	Pharmaceuticals	Biysk	1991	Dietary supplements
Evraz	Евраз	Basic materials	Iron & steel	Moscow	1992	Steel & mining
GAZ Group	Группа ГАЗ	Industrials	Commercial vehicles & trucks	Nizhny Novgorod	2005	Trucks, buses, defense, owned by Basic Element
Gazprom	Газпром	Oil & gas	Oil & gas producers	Moscow	1989	Petroleum
Gazprom Media	Газпром-Медиа	Consumer services	Media	Moscow	2000	Broadcasting & entertainment, part of Gazprom
Gazprom Neft	Газпром нефть	Oil & gas	Oil & gas producers	Moscow	1995	Refining, part of Gazprom
Gazprom Space Systems	Газпром космические системы	Industrials	Aerospace, space industry	Shchyolkovo	1992	Communication satellites manufacturer, part of Gazprom
Gazprombank	Газпромбанк	Financials	Banks	Moscow	1990	Part of Gazprom
Gloria Jeans		Consumer goods	Clothing and accessories	Moscow	1988	Apparel & accessories
Gorky Film Studio	Киностудия имени М. Горького	Consumer services	Media	Moscow	1915	Film studio
Gosbank		Financials	Banks	Moscow	1921	Central bank, defunct 1991
High Precision Systems	Высокоточные комплексы	Industrials	Aerospace & defense	Moscow	2009	Ammunition, defense equipment, owned by Rostec
Ikar		Consumer services	Airline	Orenburg	1993	
Inter RAO	Интер Рао	Utilities	Electricity	Moscow	1997	Electrical power generation & distribution
International Industrial Bank	Международный Промышленный Банк	Financials	Banks	Moscow	1992	
Ingosstrakh	Ингосстрах	Financials	Insurance	Moscow	1947	Full line insurance, life, reinsurance
Interfax	Интерфакс	Consumer services	Media	Moscow	1989	News agency
Intourist	Интурист	Consumer services	Travel & tourism	Moscow	1929	Former state travel agency, defunct 2019, sold to Anex Tours (UK)
Irkutskenergo	Иркутскэнерго	Utilities	Electricity	Irkutsk	1992	Hydroelectric power generation
Irmash	Ирмаш	Industrials	Construction equipment	Bryansk	1752	Paver, road roller, grader, excavators, utility equipment
Izhevsk Mechanical Plant	Ижевский механический завод	Industrials	Defense	Izhevsk	1942	defunct 2013, merged with Kalashnikov Concern
Kalashnikov Concern	АО Концерн Калашников	Industrials	Defense	Izhevsk	1807	Firearms, owned by Rostec
Kamaz	КамАЗ	Industrials	Commercial vehicles & trucks	Naberezhnye Chelny	1969	Trucks, buses, diesel engines, defense, owned by Rostec
Kazanorgsintez	Казаньоргсинтез	Basic materials	Chemicals	Kazan	1959	Polyethylene products
Kaspersky Lab	Лаборатория Касперского	Technology	Software	Moscow	1997	Cyber security software
Kirov Plant	Кировский завод	Industrials	Agricultural machinery	Saint Petersburg	1801	Tractors, escalators, artillery
Klimovsk Specialized Ammunition Plant		Industrials	Defense	Klimovsk	1936	Ammunition
Kombat Armouring		Consumer goods	Automobiles & parts	Saint Petersburg	1985	Armorized vehicles
Komus	Комус	Consumer services	Retail	Moscow	1990	Office & school items retailer
Krasnoe & Beloe		Consumer services	Retail	Chelyabinsk	2006	Alcoholic beverages retailer
Krasnogorsky Zavod	Красногорский завод им	Industrials	Electronic & electrical equipment	Moscow	2008	Optical engineering, optoelectronics, cameras, Part of Shvabe Holding
KrioRus	КриоРус	Technology	Biotechnology	Moscow	2006	Cryopreservation company
Kuzbassenergo	Кузбассэнерго	Utilities	Electricity	Barnaul	1943	Electric power distribution
Lavochkin	Лавочкина	Industrials	Aerospace & defense	Moscow	1937	Space industry, missiles systems, owned by Roscosmos
Lebedyansky	Лебедянский	Consumer goods	Food & beverage	Lebedyan	1967	Soft drinks, owned by PepsiCo (USA)
Lenfilm	Киностудия «Ленфильм»	Consumer services	Media	Saint Petersburg	1914	Film studio
Lenta	Магнит	Consumer goods	Retail	Saint Petersburg	1993	Supermarkets & hypermarkets chain
Lobaev Arms		Industrials	Defense	Tarusa	2003	Firearms
LOMO	ЛОМО	Industrials	Electronic & electrical equipment	Saint Petersburg	1914	Optical engineering, medical equipment, Cameras, lenses, video recorders
LSR Group		Industrials	Construction & materials	Saint Petersburg	1993	Heavy construction, real estate developer
Lukoil	ЛУКОЙЛ	Oil & gas	Oil & gas producers	Moscow	1991	Petroleum
Magnit	Магнит	Consumer goods	Retail	Krasnodar	1994	Supermarkets & hypermarkets chain
Magnitogorsk Iron and Steel Works	Магнитогорский металлургический комбинат	Basic materials	Iron & steel	Magnitogorsk	1932	Iron and steel
Makeyev Rocket Design Bureau	Государственный ракетный центр имени академика В. П. Макеева	Industrials	Aerospace & defense	Miass	1947	Missiles & rockets design, owned by Roscosmos
Marussia Motors	Маруся	Consumer goods	Automobiles & parts	Moscow	2007	Sports car, defunct 2014
Maykor		Consumer services	Business support services	Moscow	2010	Bankrupt in 2019
Mechel	Мечел	Basic materials	Diversified metals & mining	Moscow	2003	Coal, iron and steel
MegaFon	МегаФон	Telecommunications	Mobile Telecommunications	Moscow	2002	Mobile network
Melodiya	Мелодия	Consumer services	Media	Moscow	1964	Record label
Melon Fashion Group		Consumer goods	Retail	Saint Petersburg	2005	Apparel & accessories
Metalloinvest	Металлоинвест	Basic materials	Iron & steel	Moscow	1999	Steel & mining
Mikron Group		Technology	Semiconductors	Zelenograd	1964	Semiconductors, microelectronics
Military Industrial Company	Военно-промышленная компания	Industrials	Commercial vehicles & trucks	Moscow	2006	Military vehicles, defense, part of JSC Russian Machines
Mir	Мир	Financials	Consumer services	Moscow	2015	Card payment systems
Molodaya Gvardiya	Молодая гвардия	Consumer services	publishing	Moscow	1922	Publishing
Moscow City Telephone Network	Московская городская телефонная сеть	Telecommunications	Fixed line telecommunications	Moscow	1882	Mobile network, owned by Sistema
Mosfilm	Киноконце́рн «Мосфи́льм»	Consumer services	Media	Moscow	1920	Film studio
Moskvitch	Москвич	Consumer goods	Automobiles & parts	Moscow	1930	
Mostotrest		Industrials	Construction & materials	Moscow	1930	Heavy construction
Mosvodokanal		Utilities	Water	Moscow	1779	Water supply & sanitation
Motovilikha Plants	Мотовилихинские заводы	Industrials	Defense	Perm	1736	Artillery, howitzer armaments, owned by Rostec
MTS	Мобильные ТелеСистемы	Telecommunications	Mobile telecommunications	Moscow	1993	Mobile network, owned by Sistema
M.video	М.Видео	Consumer services	Retail	Moscow	1993	Electronics retailer
NAMI	НАМИ	Consumer goods	Automobiles & parts	Moscow	1918	Automotive research institute
NEWSru	NEWSru.com	Consumer services	Media	Moscow	2000	News agency
Nitol Solar		Energy	Renewable energy equipment	Moscow	1998	Solar energy product's materials manufacturer
Nizhnekamskneftekhim	Нижнекамскнефтехим	Basic materials	Chemicals	Nizhnekamsk	1967	Plastic & rubber products
NordStar		Consumer services	Airline	Norilsk	2009	
Norilsk Nickel	Норильский никель	Basic materials	Diversified metals & mining	Moscow	1993	Nickel, palladium & other metals
North-West Telecom	Северо-Западный Телеком	Telecommunications	Fixed line telecommunications	Saint Petersburg	2001	Defunct 2011, acquired by Rostelecom
Novatek	Новатэк	Oil & gas	Oil & gas producers	Tarko-Sale	1944	Petroleum
Novolipetsk Steel	Новолипецкий металлургический комбинат	Basic materials	Iron & steel	Lipetsk	1931	Steel
Novoroscement	Новоросцемент	Industrials	Construction & materials	Novorossiysk	1922	Cement
NVS Telematic Systems		Telecommunications	Telecommunications equipment	Moscow	2011	GLONASS, GPS signaling equipment manufacturer
OAO Kondopoga	ОАО «Ко́ндопога»	Basic materials	Paper	Kondopoga	1922	Paper products
OAO TMK	Трубная металлургическая компания	Basic materials	Iron & steel	Moscow	2001	Steel pipes
Oboronprom	Объединённая промышленная корпорация «Оборонпром»	Industrials	Aerospace & defense	Moscow	2002	Defunct 2018, merged into Rostec
OGGI		Consumer goods	Clothing and accessories	Saint Petersburg	1998	Fashion chain retail
OGK-1	Оптовая генерирующая компания № 1	Utilities	Electricity	Tyumen	2005	Defunct 2012
OGK-2	Оптовая генерирующая компания № 2	Utilities	Electricity	Moscow	2005	Thermal power generation, part of Gazprom
OGK-3	Оптовая генерирующая компания № 3	Utilities	Electricity	Ulan-Ude	2004	Defunct 2012
OGK-6	Оптовая генерирующая компания № 6	Utilities	Electricity	Rostov-on-Don	2005	Defunct 2011
ORSIS		Industrials	Defense	Moscow	2011	Firearms
Otkritie Holding		Conglomerate		Moscow	1992	Defunct 2024
United Heavy Machinery	Объединённые машиностроительные заводы	Industrials	Industrial engineering	Moscow	1996	Power plant engineering, owned by Gazprombank
Ozon		Technology	Internet	Moscow	1991	E-commerce, online retail, owned by Sistema
Permalco		Consumer goods	Food & beverage	Perm	1885	Brewers, vodka maker
PC Transport Systems	ПК Транспортные системы	Industrials	Rail equipment	Moscow	2002	Trams, trolleybuses, electric buses
5TV	Пятый канал	Consumer services	Media	Saint Petersburg	1938	Broadcasting & entertainment
Petersburg Fuel Company	Петербургская топливная компания	Oil & gas	Oil & gas producers	Saint Petersburg	1994	Petroleum refining & marketing
Petrodvorets Watch Factory	Петродворцовый часовой завод	Consumer goods	Personal goods	Petergof	1721	Watches, oldest factory in Russia.
Pharmstandard	Фармстандарт	Health care	Pharmaceuticals	Dolgoprudny	2003	
PhosAgro		Basic materials	Chemicals	Moscow	2003	Fertilizers
PIK Group	Группа компаний ПИК	Financials	Real estate	Moscow	1994	
Polyus	Полюс Золото	Basic materials	Gold	Moscow	2005	Gold mining
Power Machines	Силовые машины	Industrials	Industrial machinery	Saint Petersburg	2000	Generators, turbines, power machinery equipment
Progress Rocket Space Centre	Ракетно-космический центр «Прогресс»	Industrials	Aerospace & defense	Samara	1996	Space industry, missiles systems, owned by Roscosmos
PROMT	PROMT	Technology	Software	Moscow	1991	Translation software
Protek Pharmaceuticals		Health care	Pharmaceuticals	Moscow	1990	
Proton-Electrotex		Technology	Semiconductors	Oryol	1996	Semiconductors, microelectronics
Rambler	Рамблер-Афиша-SUP	Technology	Internet	Moscow	1996	Internet search engine, e-commerce owned by Sberbank
Razgulay	Разгуля́й	Consumer goods	Food & beverage	Moscow	1992	Defunct 2017
RBK Group	РБК	Consumer services	Media	Moscow	1993	Media conglomerate
Red Wings Airlines		Consumer services	Airline	Moscow	1999	
REGNUM	Regnum	Consumer services	Media	Moscow	2002	News agency
Renova Group	Альфа-Групп	Conglomerate		Moscow	1990	Energy, oil, telecommunication
Rolf	Рольф	Consumer services	Retail	Moscow	1991	Automotive retailer
Rosatom	Росатом	Industrials	Alternative energy	Moscow	2007	Nuclear energy, wind energy & hydrogen fuel
Roscosmos	Роскосмос	Industrials	Aerospace & defense, space agency	Moscow	1992	State-owned aerospace technology & space research agency
Rosenergomash	Росэнергомаш	Industrials	Industrial engineering	Moscow	2007	Industrial generators, motors
Rosgosstrakh	Росгосстрах	Financials	Insurance	Moscow	1921	Full line insurance
Rosoboronexport		Industrials	Industrial suppliers	Moscow	2000	Defense & military products exporting service provider, part of Rostec
Rosneft	Роснефть	Oil & gas	Oil & gas producers	Moscow	1993	Petroleum
Rosseti	Россети	Utilities	Electricity	Moscow	2008	Electric power distribution
Rossiya Airlines		Consumer services	Airline	Saint Petersburg	1934	Flag-carrier airline, part of Aeroflot
Rostec		Conglomerate		Moscow	1989	Aerospace, commercial & military vehicles, defense products, electronics, industrial machinery
Rostelecom	Ростелеком	Telecommunications	Fixed line telecommunications	Moscow	1992	Mobile network, broadband internet, cable, cloud network, cybersecurity solutions, digital services
Rostselmash	Ростсельмаш	Industrials	Agricultural machinery	Rostov-on-Don	1929	Agricultural & road building machinery
Rosvodokanal		Utilities	Water	Moscow	1949	Water supply & sanitation, owned by Alfa Group
RTI Systems	РТИ Системы	Industrials	Electronic & electrical equipment	Moscow	-	Defense electronics & equipment, owned by Sistema
RUSAL	Российский алюминий	Basic materials	Aluminium	Moscow	2007	Aluminium
Ruselectronics	Росэлектроника	Industrials	Electronic & electrical equipment	Moscow	1997	Electronics, microelectronics & equipment, defense, owned by Rostec
RusHydro		Utilities	Electricity	Surgut	2006	Hydroelectric generation
Russneft		Oil & gas	Oil & gas producers	Moscow	2002	Refining
Russian Agricultural Bank		Financials	Banks	Moscow	2000	Agribusiness support bank
Russian Helicopters	Вертолёты России	Industrials	Aerospace & defense	Moscow	2007	Divided into Mil Moscow Helicopter, Kamov, Kazan Helicopters, Rostvertol, Ulan-Ude Aviation, Stupino Machine. Owned by Rostec
Russian Machines	Русские машины	Industrials	Industrial machinery	Moscow	2011	Aircraft manufacturing, agricultural machinery, automotive components, railway engineering, road construction machinery, Owned by Basic Element
Russian Post	Почта России	Industrials	Delivery services	Moscow	2002	Postal service
Russian Railways	Российские железные дороги	Transportation	Railway services	Moscow	1992	
S7 Airlines	Авиакомпания «Сибирь»	Consumer services	Airline	Novosibirsk	1992	Airline
Sakhalin Energy		Oil & gas	Oil & gas producers	Yuzhno-Sakhalinsk	1994	Petroleum, owned by Gazprom
Saratov Electrical		Consumer goods	Consumer electronics	Saratov	1951	refrigration equipment
Sberbank	Сбербанк	Financials	Banks	Moscow	1841	
Severstal	Северсталь	Basic materials	Iron & steel	Cherepovets	1993	Steel & mining
Shvabe Holding	Швабе	Industrials	Electronic & electrical equipment	Moscow	2008	Optics, defense, owned by Rostec
Siberian Coal Energy Company	Сибирская угольная энергетическая компания	Basic materials	Coal	Moscow	2001	Coal
Sibirtelecom	Сибирьтелеком	Telecommunications	Fixed line Telecommunications	Novosibirsk	1992	Defunct 2011, acquired by Rostelecom
Sibur		Basic materials	Chemicals	Moscow	1995	Plastic & rubber products
Silant		Consumer goods	Automobiles & parts	Novgorod Oblast	2011	Trucks
Sinar	Синар	Consumer goods	Clothing and accessories	Novosibirsk	1921	Apparel & accessories
Sinara Group	Группа Синара	Conglomerate		Ekaterinburg	2001	Railroad equipment, real estate, hotels
Sistema	Система	Conglomerate		Moscow	1993	Telecommunications, banking, retail, media, tourism, healthcare, space, electronics
Sitronics	Ситроникс	Industrials	Electronic & electrical equipment	Moscow	1997	Microelectronics, part of Sistema
Slavneft		Oil & gas	Oil & gas producers	Moscow	1994	Refining
Sollers JSC	Северсталь-Авто	Consumer goods	Automobiles & parts	Cherepovets	2002	
Sogaz	Согаз	Financials	Insurance	Moscow	1993	Full line insurance, owned by Gazprom
Southern Telecom	Южная телекоммуникационная компания	Telecommunications	Fixed line Telecommunications	Krasnodar	2001	Mobile network, broadband internet, cable
Sovcomflot	Совкомфлот	Transportation	Marine transportation	Saint Petersburg	1995	Maritime transportation & shipping
Sozvezdie	Концерн «Созвездие»	Industrials	Electronic & electrical equipment	Voronezh	1958	Electronic Equipment, Defense, owned by Rostec
Speech Technology Center		Technology	Software	Moscow	1990	Voice recognition, biometric information software
Spetsteh		Consumer goods	Automobiles & parts	Nizhny Novgorod	1980	All-terrain vehicles
Sportmaster		Consumer goods	Clothing and accessories	Moscow	1992	Sporting apparel & accessories
Stankoprom	Станкопром	Industrials	Industrial engineering	Moscow	2013	Machine tools, owned by Rostec
State Bank of the Russian Empire		Financials	Banks	Moscow	1860	Central bank, defunct 1920
Start		Consumer services	Media	Moscow	2017	Subscription-based media streaming service
Stroygazmontazh		Industrials	Construction & materials	Moscow	2008	Heavy construction
Stroytransgaz		Industrials	Industrial engineering	Moscow	1990	Petroleum industry engineering, storage facilities, heavy construction
SU-155	СУ-155	Conglomerate		Moscow	1993	Defunct 2015
Surgutneftegas	Сургутнефтегаз	Oil & gas	Oil & gas producers	Surgut	1993	Petroleum
Svyazinvest	Связьинвест	Telecommunications	Fixed line Telecommunications	Moscow	1994	Defunct 2013, acquired by Rostelecom
Svyaznoy	Связной	Consumer services	Retail	Moscow	1997	Defunct 2023
Synqera		Technology	Software	Saint Petersburg	2010	Retail & shopping based software
T Plus		Utilities	Electricity	Krasnogorsk	2002	Electric power generation, owned by Renova Group
T-Platforms	Т-платформы	Technology	Computer hardware	Moscow	2002	Supercomputer, defunct 2022
Tactical Missiles Corporation	Корпорация „Тактическое ракетное вооружение“	Industrials	Aerospace & defense	Korolyov, Moscow Oblast	2002	Missile systems
Tasma	Тасма	Basic materials	Chemicals	Kazan	1933	Photographic materials
Tatneft	Татнефть	Oil & gas	Oil & gas producers	Almetyevsk	1950	Petroleum
Technodinamika	Технодинамика	Industrials	Electronic & electrical equipment	Moscow	2009	Aviation equipment, owned by Rostec
Tecmash	Техмаш	Industrials	Defense	Moscow	2011	Firearms, owned by Rostec
TNK-BP	ТНК-BP	Oil & gas	Oil & gas producers	Moscow	2003	Defunct 2013
TogliattiAzot	Тольяттиазот	Basic materials	Chemicals	Togliatti	1974	Commodity chemicals, part of Uralchem
Tomskneft		Oil & gas	Oil & gas producers	Strezhevoy	1966	Petroleum
Transmashholding	Трансмашхолдинг	Industrials	Rail equipment	Moscow	2002	Railway vehicles
Transneft	Транснефть	Oil & gas	Oil & gas distribution	Moscow	1992	Gas pipelines
Trolza	Тролза	Industrials	Commercial vehicles & trucks	Engels, Saratov Oblast	1868	defunct 2020
TsUM Trading House	Торговый дом ЦУМ	Consumer services	Retail	Moscow	1857	Luxury items departmental store
Tver Carriage Works	Тверской вагоностроительный завод	Industrials	Rail equipment	Tver	1898	Railroad cars, part of Transmashholding
TV Tsentr	Телекомпания „ТВ Центр“	Consumer services	Media	Moscow	1956	Broadcasting & entertainment
Unipro	Оптовая генерирующая компания № 4	Utilities	Electricity	Surgut	2006	Formerly OGK-4. Owned by Uniper (Germany)
United Aircraft Corporation	Объединённая авиастроительная корпорация	Industrials	Aerospace & defense	Moscow	2006	Divided into Sukhoi, Mikoyan, Yakovlev, Ilyushin, Tupolev, Beriev, Myasishchev, Irkut, Aviastar, Voronezh Aircraft. Owned by Rostec
United Confectioners	Объединённые кондитеры	Consumer goods	Food & beverage	Moscow	2000	Confectionery & bakery products
United Engine Corporation	Объединённая двигателестроительная корпорация	Industrials	Industrial Machinery	Moscow	1933	Civil & military aircraft engines, owned by Rostec
United Instrument Manufacturing Corporation		Industrials	Electronic & electrical equipment	Moscow	2014	Defunct 2017, merged into Ruselectronics
United Shipbuilding Corporation	Объединённая судостроительная корпорация	Industrials	Shipbuilding	Saint Petersburg	2007	Shipyards
Uralchem		Basic materials	Chemicals	Moscow	2007	Specialty chemicals
Uralkali	Уралкалий	Basic materials	Chemicals	Berezniki	1930	Fertilizers
Uralmash	Машиностроительная корпорация „Уралмаш“, УЗТМ	Industrials	Industrial machinery	Ekaterinburg	1933	Excavators, drilling machinery, plant & rig machinery, owned by United Heavy Machinery
Ural Mining and Metallurgical Company	Уральская горно-металлургическая компания	Basic materials	Diversified metals & mining	Verkhnyaya Pyshma	1999	Nickel, copper, coal, lead
Uralsib	Страховая группа «Уралсиб»	Financials	Banks	Moscow	1993	Commercial bank
UAZ	УАЗ	Industrials	Commercial vehicles & trucks	Ulyanovsk	1941	Buses, trucks, SUVs, off-road vehicles, part of Sollers JSC
Ural Airlines		Consumer services	Airline	Yekaterinburg	1943	
UralAZ	УралАЗ	Industrials	Commercial vehicles & trucks	Miass	1941	Military vehicles, defense
Uralsvyazinform	Уралсвязьинформ	Telecommunications	Fixed line telecommunications	Ekaterinburg	1992	Defunct 2011, acquired by Rostelecom
Uralvagonzavod	Научно-производственная корпорация „Уралвагонзавод“ имени Ф. Э. Дзержинского	Industrials	Commercial vehicles & trucks	Nizhny Tagil	1936	Agricultural machinery, military vehicles, defense, bulldozers, heavy equipment, railway vehicles, containers, owned by Rostec
UTair	Авиакомпания «ЮТэйр»	Consumer services	Airline	Khanty-Mansiysk	1967	Airline
VEB.RF	-	Financials	Investment services	Moscow	1922	Investment management
Vega Radio Engineering Corporation	Концерн радиостроения	Industrials	Electronic & electrical equipment	Moscow	1944	Radars & surveillance equipment, defense, owned by Rostec
Vologda Mechanical Plant	Вологодский механический завод	Industrials	Commercial vehicles & trucks	Vologda	1994	Buses, trolleybuses
VK	ВКонтакте	Technology	Internet	Moscow	1998	Search engine, e-commerce, social networking
Voenizdat	Воениздат	Consumer services	publishing	Moscow	1919	Publishing
Volchok	ВОЛЧОК	Consumer goods	Clothing and accessories	Saint Petersburg	2014	Streetwear manufacturer
VolgaTelecom	ВолгаТелеком	Telecommunications	Fixed line telecommunications	Nizhny Novgorod	2002	Mobile network, broadband internet, cable
VimpelCom		Telecommunications	Mobile Telecommunications	Moscow	1992	Mobile network
Volgotanker	Волготанкер	Industrials	Commercial vehicles & trucks	Samara	1938	Defunct 2008
Volgabus	Волжанин	Industrials	Commercial vehicles & trucks	Volzhsky, Volgograd Oblast	1993	Buses
VSK Insurance	Страховой Дом ВСК	Financials	Insurance	Moscow	1992	Full line insurance, reinsurance
VSMPO-AVISMA	ВСМПО-АВИСМА	Basic materials	Diversified metals & mining	Verkhnyaya Salda	1933	Titanium, aluminium, magnesium, owned by Rostec
VTB Bank	Банк ВТБ	Financials	Banks	Moscow	1990	
Wimm-Bill-Dann Foods	Вимм-Билль-Данн Продукты питания	Consumer goods	Food & beverage	Moscow	1992	Dairy products, owned by PepsiCo (USA)
X5 Retail Group	X5 Retail Group	Consumer services	Retail	Moscow	2006	Supermarkets & hypermarkets chain, owned by Alfa Group
Yandex	Яндекс	Technology	Internet	Moscow	1997	Internet search engine, e-commerce, online retail, IT services
Yakutia Airlines		Consumer services	Airline	Yakutsk	2002	
Yamal Airlines		Consumer services	Airline	Salekhard	1997	
Yuganskneftegaz	Юганскнефтегаз	Oil & gas	Oil & gas producers	Nefteyugansk	1964	Petroleum, part of Rosneft
Zarubezhneft		Oil & gas	Oil & gas producers	Moscow	1967	Petroleum
Zelenodolsk Shipyard		Industrials	Shipbuilding	Zelenodolsk	1895	Shipyard, owned by Ak Bars Holding
Zerich	-	Financials	Investment services	Moscow	1993	Investment management, owned by Freedom Holding (USA)
ZiL	ЗИЛ	Industrials	Commercial vehicles & trucks	Moscow	1916	Defunct 2012

== See also ==
- Economy of Russia
- List of banks in Russia
- Moscow Exchange
