= Dalsvyaz =

OJSC Dalsvyaz
- Native name: Дальсвязь
- Company type: Joint stock
- Industry: Telecommunications
- Founded: 2001
- Defunct: 2011
- Fate: Merged with Rostelecom
- Successor: Rostelecom
- Headquarters: Vladivostok
- Key people: Alekseev Anton Alekseevich, General Director Kolpakov; Anton Your’evich, Deputy General Director
- Products: Telecommunications services Internet services cable television
- Parent: Svyazinvest
- Website: www.dsv.ru

OJSC Dalsvyaz (Russian: ОАО «Дальсвязь») is a telecommunications service provider active in the Russian Far East. It is part of Svyazinvest Holdings, which is Russia's largest telecommunications holding company, and which owns many large regional telecommunications service providers in Russia.

== History ==
Dalsvyaz was created on the basis of the merger of Elektrosvyaz of Primorsky Krai with the following entities:

- Electrosvyaz of Khabarovsk Krai
- Sakhalinsvyaz
- Kamchatsvyazinform
- Amursvyaz
- Magadansvyazinform
- Telephone-Telegraph Company of the Jewish Autonomous Oblast
- Vladivostok City Telephone Network
- Primtelefon
- Dal Telekom Interneshnel

Dalvyaz owned a significant amount of the stock of the following companies:

- KamAlascom Joint Venture LLC – Long-distance network between the Kamchatka region and the state of Alaska, USA
- MagAlascom Joint Venture LLC – Long Distance network between the Magadan region and the state of Alaska, USA
- CJSC TeleRoss-Vladivostok – Agency services
- CJSC Transicom, Bogoyavlensky Aleksey Gennadievich – Trunk communication
- Interdaltelecom LLC – Local telecommunication services in Vladivostok
- Besprovodniye Informatsionniye Sistemy" (Wireless information technologies) LLC – Cellular network services
- Integrator.ru CJSC – Investment activities
- CJSC AKOS – Cellular network services 92,26%
- Sakhalinugol’ Telecom CJSC – Local telephone service and internet service provider on Sakhalin Island

== See also ==
- CenterTelecom
- North-West Telecom
- Sibirtelecom
- Southern Telecom
- Uralsviazinform
- VolgaTelecom
- Rostelecom
