= Molchanov =

Molchanov (Russian: Молчанов) is a Russian male surname. Its feminine counterpart is Molchanova (Russian: Молчанова). Notable people with the surname include:

- Alexey Molchanov (born 1987), Russian freediver, son of Natalia
- Andrey Molchanov (businessman) (born 1971), Russian politician
- Andrey Molchanov (swimmer) (born 1987), Olympic swimmer from Turkmenistan
- Denys Molchanov (born 1987), Ukrainian tennis player
- Ilya Molchanov (born 1997), Russian diver
- Kirill Molchanov (1922–1982), Russian composer
- Pavel Molchanov (1893–1941), Russian meteorologist
- Viktorin Molchanov (1886–1975), Russian General who participated in the White movement
- Yuriy Molchanov (born 1952), Russian businessman and politician
- Natalia Molchanova (1962–2015), Russian freediver, mother of Alexey
- Olga Molchanova (born 1979), Olympic swimmer from Kyrgyzstan
- Stanislav Molchanov, (born 1940), Russian Mathematician
