= Andrey Molchanov =

Andrey Molchanov may refer to:

- Andrey Molchanov (businessman) (born 1971), Russian politician
- Andreý Molçanow (born 1987), Olympic swimmer from Turkmenistan
