= Nestlé Rossiya =

Russian food company

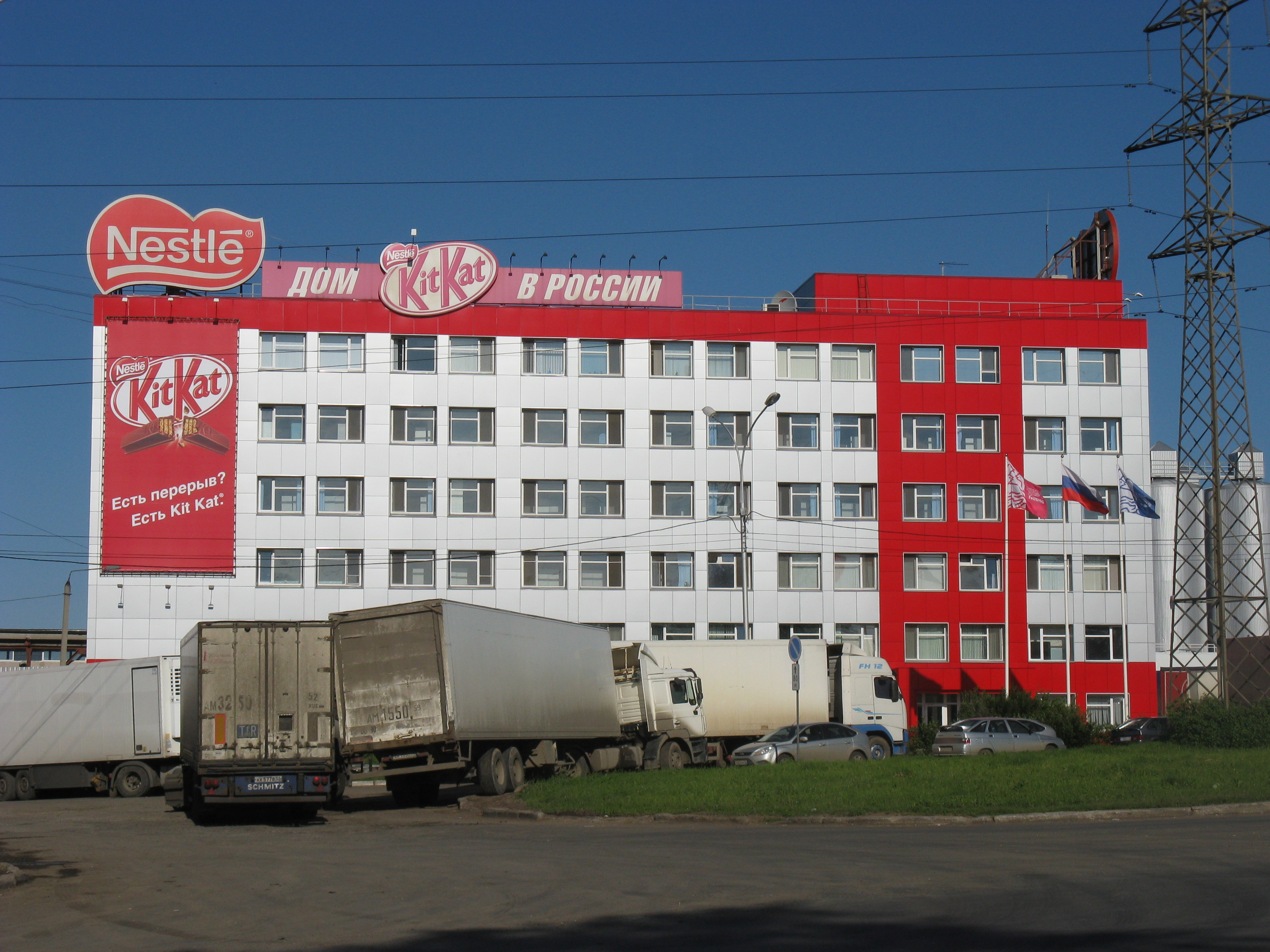
Nestle in Perm

Nestlé Rossiya is a Russian company that manufactures confectioneries, chocolate, and other products such as prepared foods, dairy products, ice cream, beverages, infant foods, and pet care products. It is based in Moscow, Russia and was established in 1871.

Nestlé Rossiya is a subsidiary of Nestlé S.A. The company's former name was Nestlé Food LLC, and it was renamed to Nestlé Rossiya in 2007.

== Activity ==
The product line includes more than two thousand brands: «Russia — shedraya dusha», Nescafe Gold, Maggi, «Golden mark» and Nuts. The company operates in 191 countries around the world. Nestle's total investments in the Russian economy from 1996 to 2015 amounted to more than $1.85 billion. Nine factories operate in the country. Nestle's employees in the Russia-Eurasia region are about 10 thousand people.

== Ownership ==
- Nestle S.A. – 84.08%

=== CEO ===
Rolland Martial (in 1988 he began working at Nestle, in 2017 he became the Head of Nestle in the Russia and Eurasia region).

== See also ==
- List of companies of Russia
