= Andrey Komarov =

Russian entrepreneur

Andrey Ilyich Komarov
- Комаров Андрей Ильич
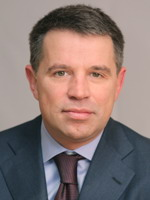
- Komarov in 2008
- Born: 11 October 1966 (age 59); Ozyorsk, Chelyabinsk Oblast, Soviet Union
- Citizenship: Russian
- Occupation: Entrepreneur
- Known for: Former owner of Chelyabinsk Pipe Rolling Plant

Andrey Ilyich Komarov (Russian: Комаров Андрей Ильич; born 11 October 1966) is a Russian entrepreneur, Member of the Board of the Russian Union of Industrialists and Entrepreneurs, and former owner of Chelyabinsk Pipe Rolling Plant.

== Early life and education ==
Andrey Komarov was born on 11 October 1966 in the city of Ozyorsk (Chelyabinsk-40) in the Soviet Union. In 1984 he entered the Moscow Institute of Chemical Engineering, graduated in 1990. In 1984-1986 he served in the Soviet Army.

== Career ==
In 1989-1992 he worked at the Moscow Satyricon Theater.

In 1992-1996 he managed and was a co-owner of a number of companies that exported metal. One of these enterprises was the Chelyabinsk Pipe Rolling Plant (ChelPipe). In 1998 Komarov became the main owner of ChelPipe, having bought a controlling stake in the company.

In 2002 he became co-chairman of the Pipe Industry Development Fund. In 2005-2006, he was a member of the Board of Directors of Pervouralsky Novotrubny Zavod.

In 2000-2010 he was one of the members of the Federation Council Committee, which dealt with natural resources and environmental protection. In 2005-2010 Komarov sat on the Federation Council of the Russian Federation, representing the Chelyabinsk Region.

In 2008 he began construction of a pipe and electric welding workshop for the production of large-diameter pipes "Vysota 239" (Russian: «Высота 239»).

In 2021 Komarov was elected co-chairman of the Russian Union of Industrialists and Entrepreneurs Committee on Vocational Training and Professional Qualifications.

In the same year Andrey Komarov sold 86.54% of ChelPipe shares to OAO TMK, the deal cost 84.2 billion rubles.

== Arrest and criminal case ==
In March 2014, Andrei Komarov and his lawyer were detained by officers of the Main Directorate for Combating Economic Crimes and Anti-Corruption of the Ministry of Internal Affairs. Investigators believed that Komarov and Shibanov tried to give a bribe an official of the FSUE "Promresurs", who, during an inspection of Chelyabinsk Pipe Rolling Plant, revealed violations that allowed the enterprise to unreasonably receive material benefits in the amount of 2 billion rubles. For a bribe of $300,000, the investigation believed, the official should have given a positive conclusion on the results of the audit. But he filed a complaint with law enforcement agencies. In 2016, the criminal case was closed.

== Sanctions ==
On 19 October 2022 Ukraine added Komarov to the sanctions list.

In February 2024 the United States imposed sanctions on Komarov.

== Philanthropy ==
With the help of Andrey Komarov, the Church of the Intercession of the Blessed Virgin Mary was built in the city of Ozersk.

In 2009 the country's first positron emission tomography (PET) center was built in Chelyabinsk with the participation of Andrey Komarov.

== Personal life ==
He collects paintings from the 1930s devoted to metallurgy.

== Wealth ==
Year	2008	2011	2012	2013	2017	2018	2019	2020	2021	2022
Net Worth (Billion $)	1.3	1	0.95	0.75	0.8	0.9	0.8	0.55	1.2	1.1

== Recognition ==
- Honorary Citizen of the Chelyabinsk Oblast (May 10, 2017)
- Honorary Metallurgist of the Russian Federation (2016)
- Badge "For services to the Chelyabinsk Oblast" (October 10, 2016)
