= Vadim Yakunin =

Russian billionaire businessman

- Вадим Якунин
- Born: January 4, 1963 (age 63); Rostov, Yaroslavl Oblast
- Education: Moscow Institute of Physics and Technology

Vadim Yakunin is a Russian businessman and billionaire.

== Career ==
After beginning in the Hungarian tourism sector, Yakunin founded the Rigla pharmacy chain, and later the Protek pharmaceuticals firm.

== Net worth ==
As of August 2022, Yakunin is worth $1.5 billion, according to Forbes.

== Personal life ==
Vadim Yakunin was born January 4, 1963 in Rostov, Yaroslavl Oblast.

In 1986 he graduated from the Moscow Institute of Physics and Technology.

Yakunin is married and has three children. He resides in Moscow and graduated from Moscow Institute of Physics and Technology.
