= OAO TMK =

Russian pipe manufacturer and supplier

TMK
- Native name: ПAO Трубная Металлургическая Компания
- Company type: Public
- Traded as: MCX: TRMK
- Industry: Steel industry
- Founded: 2001
- Headquarters: Moscow, Russia
- Key people: Igor Korytko (CEO)
- Products: Steel pipes
- Revenue: ₽404 billion (2025)
- Operating income: ₽28.6 billion (2025)
- Net income: ₽−24.5 billion (2025)
- Total assets: ₽596 billion (2025)
- Total equity: ₽32.6 billion (2025)
- Number of employees: 50,000
- Website: tmk-group.com

"TMK" (Russian: ПAO Трубная Металлургическая Компания, romanized: Trubnaya Metallurgicheskaya Kompaniya, lit. 'Pipe Metallurgical Co., OJSC') (MCX: TRMK) is a leading global manufacturer and supplier of steel pipes, tubular solutions and related services for the oil and gas industry, and specialty tubular products and pipeline systems for the nuclear, chemical, mechanical engineering and construction industries. Currently, the company integrates production assets in Russia, Kazakhstan, Romania and Czech Republic. and two R&D centers in Russia. It is based in Moscow, Russia.

== History ==
TMK was established in 2001.

In 2002 TMK incorporated Volzhsky Pipe Plant, Seversky Pipe Plant and Sinarsky Pipe Plant. A Trade House TMK representative office was opened in Baku (Azerbaijan).

In 2003 a new TMK subsidiary, TMK-Kazakhstan, was established.

In 2004 TMK incorporated Taganrog Metallurgical Works.

In 2005 TMK established and incorporated TMK Global, a representative office was opened in Beijing (China). CJSC TMK was reorganized into an Open Joint Stock Company.

TMK incorporated the Romanian mills TMK-Artrom and TMK-Resita, and the Russian Orsky Machine Building Plant. The TMK Middle East trading subsidiary was created the same year. In 2020, TMK announced delisting of its GDRs from LSE.

In 2007 TMK acquired oilfield service companies including Truboplast, TMK NGS-Nizhnevartovsk, and TMK NGS-Buzuluk, as well as the Russian Research Institute for the Tube and Pipe Industries (RosNITI), Russia's largest pipe industry research institute. TMK-CPW, a joint venture between TMK and Corinth Pipeworks, and ТМК-Premium Service were established. TMK's shares began trading on the MICEX Stock Exchange. Additionally, ТМК opened representative offices in Turkmenistan and Singapore.

2008 was marked by the acquisition of US pipe assets and the creation of the American division - TMK IPSCO. The company also established TMK Oilfield Services and acquired TMK-Kaztrubprom (Kazakhstan).

In 2009 the TMK European Division was created. It includes TMK Europe, TMK Italia, TMK-Artrom, TMK-Resita.

In 2010 TMK-INOX became a joint venture between TMK and RUSNANO, it coordinates production and sales of precision stainless pipes. TMK ADRs began trading on the OTCQX International Premier trading platform in the US.

In 2011 TMK representative office in Uzbekistan was opened.

In 2012 the new Research & Development Center in Houston (Texas, United States) was commissioned and the Trade House TMK subsidiary in Orsk (Orenburg region) was opened. TMK acquired 55% of Gulf International Pipe Industry L.L.C. (GIPI) located in Oman and established a service joint venture with EMDAD in Abu Dhabi, the United Arab Emirates.

In 2013 TMK acquired pipe services and precision manufacturing assets incorporated into OFSi company (Houston, USA).

In 2020, TMK closed sale of 100% of Ipsco Tubulars Inc. shares to Tenaris.

In 2021, TMK announced the transaction for acquisition of 86.54% of shares in PJSC "ChelPipe" from controlling shareholder Andrey Komarov.

In 2021, the company's revenue in Russia amounted to 322 billion rubles.

In the summer of 2023, the Cypriot company TMK Steel Holding Ltd, which owns a 90% stake in TMK, redominated to Russia. The new International Company LLC TMK received registration on Russky Island in the Primorsky Krai.

In the first half of 2024, TMK showed a record loss of 1.8 billion rubles (about 200 million dollars) - for the first time since 2021. The company explains this by a sharp rise in scrap metal prices and an increase in the cost of loans.

== Heads ==
Dmitry Pumpyansky – chairman of the Board of Directors until March, 9th, of 2022. Administrative control of the group is currently headed by its management and CEO, Igor Korytko.

== Profile ==
TMK plants produce almost the entire range of existing pipes used in the oil-and-gas sector, the chemical and petrochemical industries, energy and machine-building, construction and municipal housing, shipbuilding, aviation and aerospace, and agriculture.

TMK pipes are manufactured from carbon, stainless, and heat and cold-resistant steels, nickel alloys.

TMK delivers its products along with an extensive package of services in heat treating, protective coating, premium connections threading, warehousing and pipe repairing.

TMK's global market presence is supported by its extensive international distribution network. Sales are made through TMK Trade House and a number of other distributors. TMK supplies products to more than 80 countries around the world. In addition to direct sales, the company's products are distributed by more than 70 official dealers in Russia and the CIS.

== Production ==
TMK Russian Division

- Volzhsky Pipe Plant (Volzhsky, Russia) - since 2001
- Seversky Pipe Plant (Polevskoy, Russia) - since 2002
- Sinarsky Pipe Plant (Kamensk-Uralsky, Russia) - since 2002
- Taganrog Metallurgical Works (Taganrog, Russia) - since 2002
- TMK-Kaztrubprom (Uralsk, Republic of Kazakhstan) – since 2008
- TMK-INOX (Kamensk-Uralsky, Russia) – since 2010
- TMK-CPW (Polevskoy, Russia) – since 2007
- Parus (Yartsevo, Russia) – since 2020
- Rakityansky Rebar Plant (Rakitnoye, Russia) – since 2020
- Gus-Crystal Repair and Technical Enterprise (Gus-Khrustalny, Russia) – since 2020
- Chelyabinsk Pipe Rolling Plant (PJSC ChelPipe, Chelyabinsk, Russia) – since 2021
- Pervouralsk New Pipe Plant (Pervouralsk, Russia) – since 2021
- Orsky Machine Building Plant (Orsk, Russia)

TMK European Division

- TMK-Artrom (Slatina, Romania) – since 2006
- TMK-Resita (Resita, Romania) – since 2006
- MSA (Czech Republic) – since 2021

=== Services ===
- TMK-Premium Service (Moscow, Russia)
- Truboplast (Ekaterinburg, Russia)
- TMK NGS-Nizhnevartovsk (Nizhnevartovsk, Russia)
- TMK NGS – Buzuluk (Buzuluk, Russia)
- OFSi (Houston, USA)

== R & D ==
Russian Research Institute for the Tube and Pipe Industries (RosNITI) in Chelyabinsk (Russia) was established in 2007.

== Sponsorship ==
Russia-based entities provide support to orphanages, educational and medical institutions and finance sport teams.

In the Urals Federal District accommodating two TMK entities, charity programmes are run through the corporate charitable foundation Sinara, a professional operator. This facilitates partnership with civic institutions through grant competitions.

To promote sports, TMK sponsors:

- the Russian Ski-Jumping and Nordic Combined Federation;
- a number of professional sports clubs, including: the Ural Football Club of the Russian Premier League; the Sinara mini-football club in Yekaterinburg, a two-time champion in Russia; the Dinamo Women's Handball Club in Volgograd, an eleven-time champion in Russia; TAGMET tennis club in Taganrog;
- amateur teams representing TMK entities competing in various sports, including children's and youth sports.

TMK European Division acted as the main sponsor of Russian Culture Days 2013 in Bucharest dedicated to the 135th Anniversary of diplomatic relations between Russia and Romania.

== See also ==
- List of Russian companies
- South Stream
- Nord Stream 1 - planned gas pipeline between Russia and Germany
- Shtokman field
- Sakhalin-II
- Burgas–Alexandroupoli pipeline
