= Pharmaceutical industry in Russia =

The pharmaceutical industry in Russia had a turnover of $16.5 billion in 2016, which was equal to 1.3 % of GDP and 19.9% of health spending.

The Russian healthcare system is funded by the federal government, social spending and the Federal Compulsory Medical Insurance Fund. However, the industry expects a big shift towards the private healthcare spending.

Russia is a net importer of pharmaceuticals, importing $8.9 billion while exporting $635 million of medicines. Close to 80% of imports come from Europe, mostly from Germany and France.

== Local market ==
The Russian pharmaceutical market can be divided by prescription drugs and over the counter drugs. The prescription drugs sales historically took the biggest share of the market, capturing 61% of the market in 2016. The sales of generic drugs dominate in the prescription category at 64.5%. Out of all pharmaceutical sales they constitute only 39.4%.

The most widespread diseases in Russia are cardiovascular diseases, cancer and HIV. As a result, pharmaceutical products addressing these ailments are the leading sub-sectors for the pharmaceutical industry in Russia.

The largest manufacturers by retail sales include Sanofi, Bayer, Novartis, Servier. Pharmstandard is the largest domestic manufacturer by sales, ranking 18th in 2015.

== Distributors ==
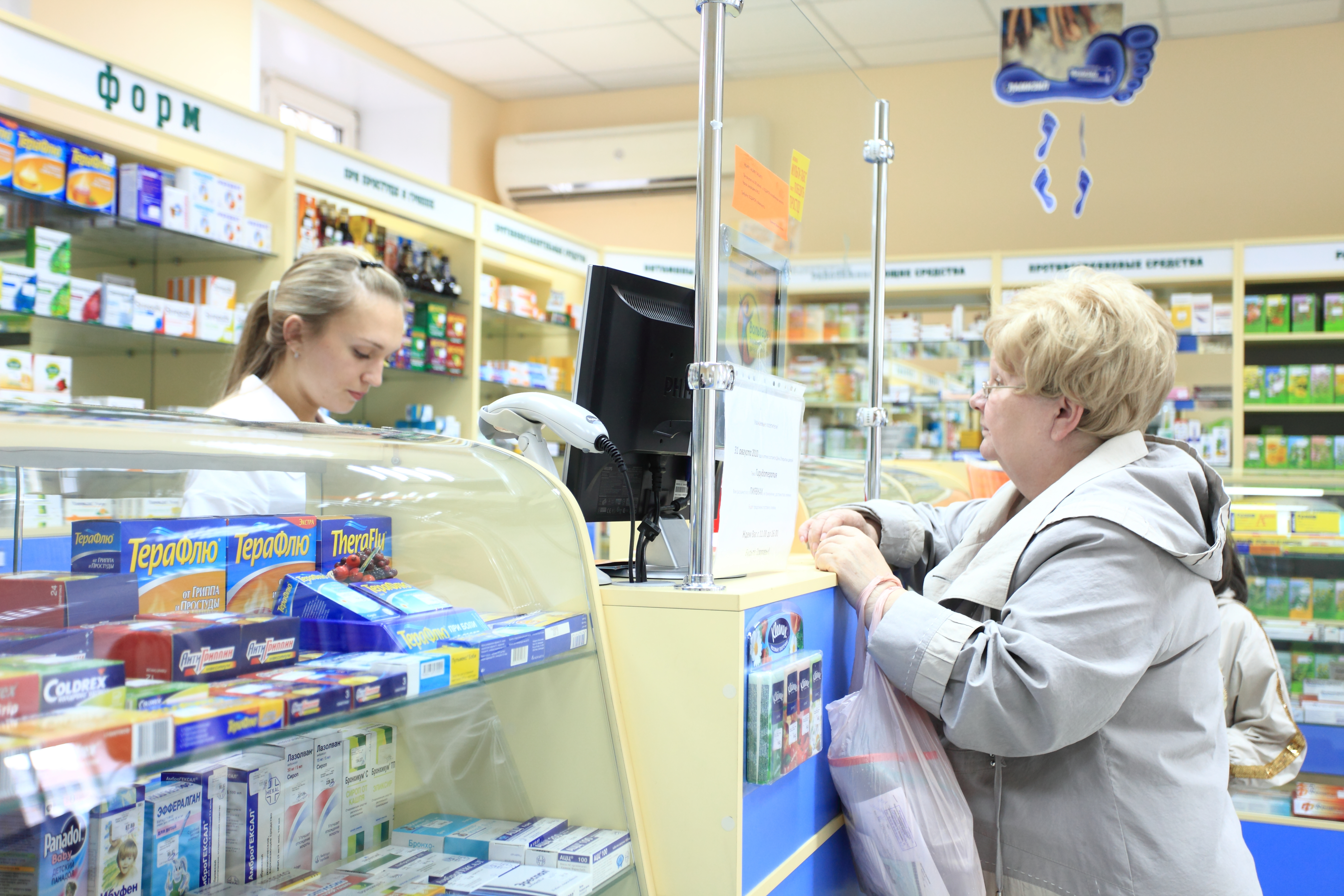
A drug store in Russia

Drug manufacturers prefer not to work with retail pharmacy chains or pharmacies directly, relying instead on distributors to promote their products to retail outlets. Distributors operate vast networks of contacts and work to direct retail distribution channels. According to DSM, one of the major Russian pharmaceutical Agencies, the major four distributors include Katren, Protek, Rosta and CIA.

The number of pharmacy chains has been growing and currently it exceeds 50,000. Most of the sales are coming from the following chains: Apteka 36.6, A5, Samson Pharma, Rigla, and Neopharm.

== Import substitution efforts ==
The Russian government is focused on creating its own pharmaceutical industry. The main document that governs this focus is the “Pharma 2020 Strategy”. Its main goal is to reduce the reliance of the Russian economy on imported pharmaceuticals. In July 2016, Prime Minister Medvedev said that he expects the domestic production to increase from 28.5% now to 75% by 2020.

== See also ==
- List of Russian drugs
