= Yuriy Molchanov =

Russian businessman and politician

Yury Molchanov
- Юрий Молчанов
- Born: June 19, 1952 (age 73); Kolomna
- Occupations: Businessman and politician

Yury Vyacheslavovich Molchanov (Russian: Юрий Вячеславович Молчанов; born July 19, 1952) is a Russian businessman and politician.

== Career ==
From 1987 to 1999, he was the Deputy Rector of Saint Petersburg State University (LSU). In 1990, he as vice rector for international affairs of LSU which is a post for plain clothes KGB and Vladimir Putin as Molchanov's assistant which, according to Oleg Kalugin, is a post for the KGB rezident formed a Joint Venture between Procter & Gamble (P&G) with a 99% share and LSU with a 1% share (Note: Both Molchanov and Putin kept this 1% share.) allowing P&G to locate in a mansion on Universitetskaya Embankment (Russian: Университетская набережная) in the Rector's wing in the same place as the international department. Of course, both Putin and Molchanov received American soap, washing detergent, and money from P&G.

From 2004 to 2012 — Vice Governor of St. Petersburg for Economic Affairs. Member of the Government of St. Petersburg.

Since 2012 — Senior Vice President of VTB.

As of 2017, he owns the Ostrov shopping and office complex on 36/40 Sredniy Prospekt Vasilyevsky Island in St. Petersburg.

He is the adoptive father of the Andrey Molchanov, the Russian billionaire who owns LSR Group, one of Russia's largest construction firms.
