= Volchok (clothing) =

Russian streetwear manufacturer

- Type: Private
- Industry: Clothing manufacturing
- Founded: 2014; 12 years ago in Saint Petersburg, Russia
- Founder: Vasily Volchok-Rusakovich
- Headquarters: Moscow, Russia
- Website: http://www.volchok.ru

Volchok (Russian: ВОЛЧОК) is a Russian streetwear manufacturer.

== History ==
Volchok was established in 2014 by Vasily Volchok-Rusakovich who previously worked at 2×2 TV Channel and dealt with Soviet vintage clothing via online store. Inspired by the success of a friendly local streetwear manufacturer Volchok-Rusakovich made 200 black tees with "Юность" (Youth) print that made the brand popular among locals. The huge media attention reached Volchok in October 2016 when L'Officiel Russia former editor-in-chief Evelina Khromchenko and Vogue Russia fashion editor Olga Dunina both wore those "Юность" black tees at a cocktail party in Galeries Lafayette.

== Design ==
Volchok designs t-shirts, sweatshirts, pants, socks, cloaks, coats and other apparel for men and women while most models fall under unisex. Clothing is (mostly) fabricated locally in Russia so it remains affordable to regular customers. According to Volchok-Rusakovich his company is also a social platform for young people as the simple design with laconic black and white color palette is intended to be a medium for messages, transmitted via prints and slogans. Volchok's most notable designs are based on Cyrillic slogans such as "Вера" (Hope), "Юность" (Youth) or "Моя оборона" (My Defence), "No Tsars No Gods". However some collections introduced a more complex graphic work. At the 11th Faces & Laces show in Moscow in August 2017 Volchok presented a collection named after the Final Fantasy game series that included drawings made in tradition of Japanese animation. Volchok FW 2018—19 collection presented at Futurum Moscow show in Museum of Moscow on the last day of Mercedes-Benz Fashion Week Russia in March 2018 included prints of birds and other wild creatures. Volchok's references are picked from the Russian underground culture even when the messages themselves are political: the SS-2018 collection presented at MBFWRussia in October 2017 was dedicated to complicated political relations between Russia and Ukraine. Volchok-Rusakovich describes the brand's nature as "Russian Gothic" while fashion magazines consider it an example of post-Soviet aesthetics.

== Reception ==
Volchok was among the first Russian streetwear brands to take part in major fashion shows. Since 2016 it has participated in seasonal Mercedes-Benz Fashion Week Russia events and Pitti Uomo exhibition in Florence, Italy in January 2018. Volchok received numerous special mentions in Vogue, L'Officiel, Fashionista and other fashion magazines as well as New East-focused The Calvert Journal as a notable representative of Russian fashion scene and part of the Russian fashion new wave. Following MBFWRussia in March 2018 i-D reporter Rae Witte called Volchok FW 2018—19 collection the most interesting streetwear collection of the shot and The Fall contributor Dee Moran acknowledged Volchok as a potential rival Gosha Rubchinskiy. В 2022 году Волчок совместно с онлайн-кинотеатром Иви выпустил коллекцию одежды, посвященная сериалу 13 клиническая. In 2022 Volchok, together with the online cinema IVI, released a collection of clothes dedicated to the TV series 13 Clinical.

== Stores ==
Volchok runs stores in Moscow (Khlebozavod #9), Saint Petersburg (Berthold Center) and in Kyiv.
