= Svyazinvest =

OJSC Svyazinvest
- Company type: Open joint stock company
- Industry: Telecommunications
- Founded: November 1994
- Defunct: October 1, 2013
- Successor: Rostelecom
- Headquarters: 7 Tverskaya St., Moscow
- Key people: Chairman of the Board of Directors: Leonid Reiman, CEO: Alexander Kiselyov
- Products: Telephony, Internet services, Cable television
- Subsidiaries: Rostelecom; Southern Telecom; CenterTelecom; Dalsvyaz; North-West Telecom; Sibirtelecom; Uralsvyazinform; VolgaTelecom
- Website: http://eng.svyazinvest.ru/

OJSC Svyazinvest (Russian: ОАО Связьинвест) was Russia's largest telecommunications holding company. Based in Moscow, it was founded according to Order №1297 of the Russian government on November 25, 1994, and was registered on September 18, 1995. It was an entirely state-owned company until some shares were privatized in the late 1990s. The company consolidated and managed the government's 51% stake in 85 of Russia's 87 regional and local telecom companies. In 2001-2003 Svyazinvest merged over 80 regional and local telecommunications companies to form seven mega-regional companies which operated alongside the long-distance operator Rostelecom.

American financier George Soros invested hundreds of millions of dollars in the company. He later called it "the worst investment he's ever made".

Following a governmental decision on the company's liquidation, its operation including brand and subsidiaries were fully incorporated to Rostelecom, the former long-distance telephony monopoly. In late September 2013, Rostelecom completed the final stage of its reorganization, under which the state-run telecom holding Svyazinvest and 20 other firms were integrated into Rostelecom. The government's combined common stake in the merged company amounted to 51.12% after the reorganization.

== History ==
In 1993, following the sale of a 49% stake in 85 of Russia’s 87 regional telephone operating companies, the Russian government consolidated its remaining 51% ownership into a newly established holding company known as Svyazinvest with the goal of accelerating the growth of public networks in Russia and establishing a unified management policy for their development. The company was established with foreign investors in mind. As part of a broader trend among major Russian enterprises seeking capital from Western markets, the Russian government offered a 25% stake in the telecommunications holding company. By attracting foreign investment, the government aimed to secure the financial resources necessary to modernize Russia’s outdated telephone infrastructure, which posed a risk to the country’s economic development.

The company was founded in accordance with Presidential Decree №1989 "On Specific Features of State Management of the Public Switched Network in the Russian Federation" dated October 10, 1994, and Government Resolution №1297 dated November 25, 1994, and Resolution №742 dated July 24, 1995 of the Government of Russia. Svyazinvest's charter capital was formed by consolidating state-owned stakes in 85 joint stock telecommunications companies. Svyazinvest passed official state registration on September 18, 1995.

In accordance with Resolution №618 issued by the Russian government on May 23, 1997, the Russian Federal Property Fund and the State Committee of the Russian Federation for State Property Management put up for sale an interest equaling 25% + 1 share in Svyazinvest at a cash auction without any investment terms.

In November 1999 Svyazinvest's board of directors amended the company charter and turned it into a management company. As part of the measures to assign the status of a management company to Svyazinvest work got under way to improve procedures to manage associates, specifically by consolidating companies located in one region.

In 2001-2002, Svyazinvest merged over 80 regional and local telecommunications companies to form seven mega-regional operators: Southern Telecom, CenterTelecom, Dalsvyaz, North-West Telecom, Sibirtelecom, Uralsvyazinform and VolgaTelecom. These entities operated under the Svyazinvest umbrella, providing local, long-distance, and international telecommunications services throughout Russia, with Rostelecom connecting their networks as the long-distance telecom operator.

In 2004, George Soros sold his stake in Svyazinvest to Len Blavatnik for $650 million.

On February 10, 2009, Malofeev, who allegedly was countering the influences of Alisher Usmanov by acting as the money man supporting the interests of Igor Shchyogolev through Malofeev's Marshall Capital, became a member of the Board of Directors of Svyazinvest OJSC while it was closely associated with Igor Shchyogolev and which led to the union of Svyazinvest with Rostelecom.

In April 2011, Svyazinvest subsidiaries were transferred to Rostelecom.

In May 2011 with Igor Shchyogolev's support, Alexander Trubetskoy became chairman of the board and Vadim Semyonov, who is a citizen of both Canada and Russia, became CEO of Svyazinvest on 3 November 2010 replacing Evgeny Yurchenko because Yurchenko refused to support Konstantin Malofeev's decisions calling Malofeev "Russia's great raider" (Russian: «великим рейдером России»). (Note: Alexander Alexandrovich Trubetskoy (Russian: Александр Александрович Трубецкой; born 1947 Paris, France) is close to both Igor Shchyogolev and Konstantin Malofeev of the Marshall Capital Fund. Trubetskoy's parents Prince Alexander Trubetskoy and Princess Alexandra Golitsyna are White Russians who lived in Paris, France following the Russian Civil War. Beginning in 1972, Trubetskoy supplied equipment for oil fields in Iraq, Syria and Lebanon. From 1975 to 1994, Trubetskoy worked at Thomson-CSF, sold computers and communications equipment to Gazprom, Academy of Sciences of the Soviet Union, RAO UES, Igor Shchyogolev, and TASS, and was working at Thomson-CSF when Vladimir Vetrov defected to the West.) (Note: Vadim Viktorovich Semyonov (Russian: Вадим Викторович Семёнов), a citizen of both Canada and Russia, was CEO of Svyazinvest from October 2011 until 2013. He attended school with both Dmitry Medvedev and Yevgeny Trubin (Russian: Евгений Трубин) who had been general director of Lenizdat.)

On October 1, 2013 Svyazinvest joined OJSC Rostelecom.

== Subsidiaries ==
- OJSC Central Telegraph (80%)
- OJSC Rostelecom (45.28%)
- OJSC Giprosvyaz (59.99%)
- OJSC Kostroma GTS (37%)
- OJSC Bashinformsvyaz (29.31%)
- OJSC Chukotkasvyazinform (100%)
- OJSC Ingushelectrosvyaz (100%)
- OJSC Moscow mezhdugorodnaya telephone station N9 (50.67%)

Svyazinvest is three-quarters owned by Rosproperty and one-quarter owned by Rostelecom.

== Management ==
=== Directors general ===
- Alexander Lipatov (August 1995–March 1996)
- Nail Ismailov (March 1996–April 1999)
- Oleg Belov (April 1999–October 1999)
- Valery Yashin (October 21, 1999–?)
- Alexander Kiselyov (June 29, 2006 – 2009)

=== Chairman of the Board ===
- Nikolay Pozhitkov (until April 1999)
- Boris Ponomarenko (April 1999–July 1999)
- Russia's Minister of Science and Technology Vladimir Bulgak (July 15, 1999–June 2000)
- Russia's Minister of Communication and Informatization Leonid Reiman (June 26, 2000–present)

As of June 29, 2006, Svyazinvest's Board of Directors included the following as members:

- Leonid Reiman, Chairman – Minister for Information Technologies and Communications
- Boris Antonyuk – Deputy Minister for Information Technologies and Communications
- Kirill Androsov – Deputy Minister for Economic Development and Trade
- Vadim Stepanov – Secretary of State, Deputy Director of the Russian Federal Protection Service
- Lyudmila Pridanova – Deputy Head of Rosimushchestvo
- Karen Markaryan – Assistant Deputy Head of the RF Government Executive Office
- Vasiliy Popick – Assistant of the RF President's Expert Department
- Anatoly Akimenko – Representative, Mustcom Ltd.
- Sergei Karpukhovich – Representative, Mustcom Ltd.

As of June 29, 2006, the Management Board included the following as members:

- Alexander Kiselyov, Chairman – Director General
- Stanislav Panchenko (Deputy Director General)
- Konstantin Belyaev (Deputy Director General)
- Evgeny Chechelnitsky (Deputy Director General)
- Vladimir Zhelonkin (Deputy Director General)

== See also ==
- Quantum Group of Funds
