= Saratov Electrical Components Production Association =

Russian company that produces refrigerators and other electrical devices

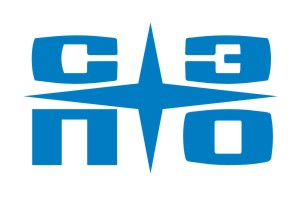

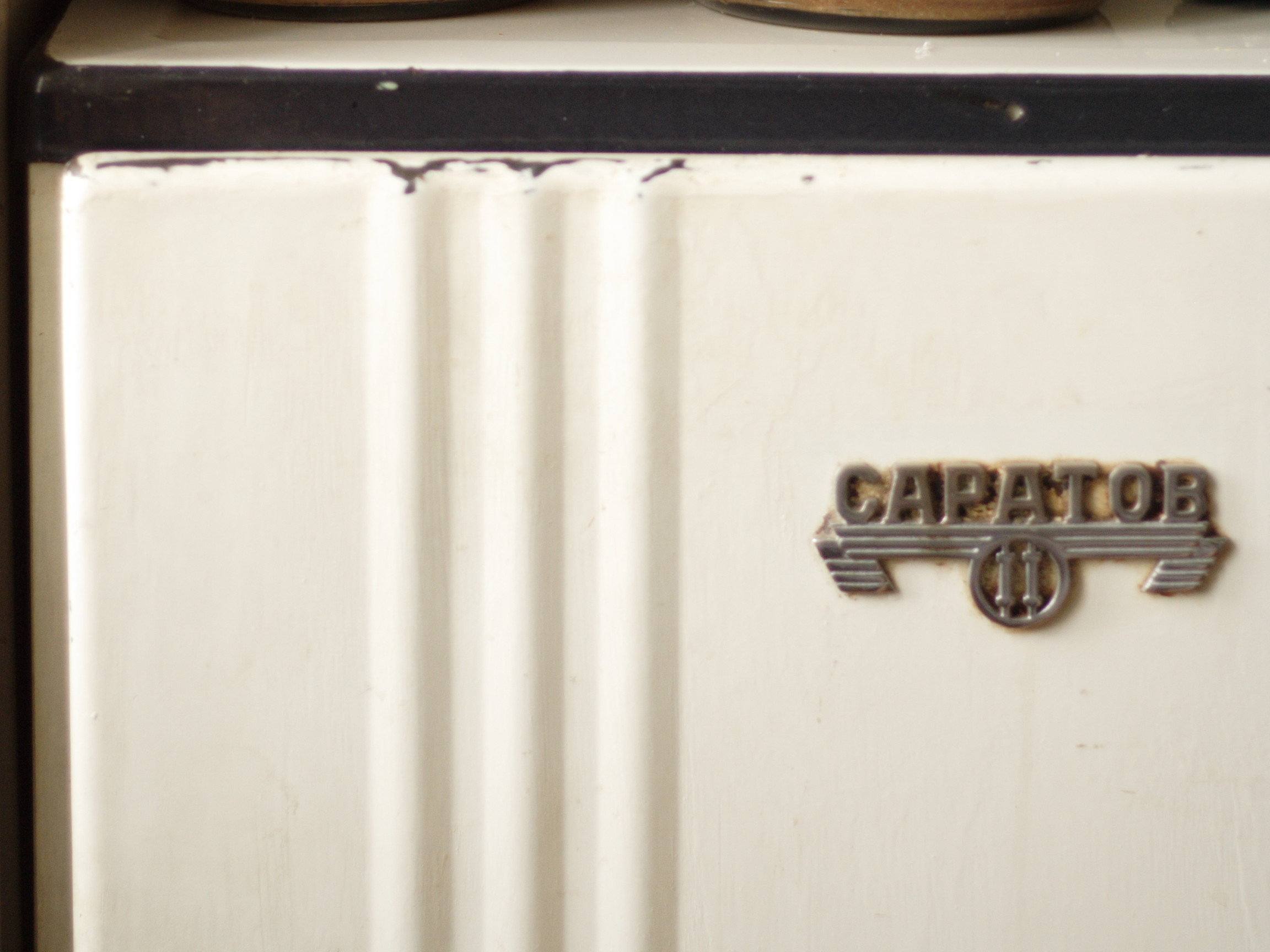
- A Saratov refrigerator
- Company type: Open joint-stock company
- Industry: Refrigeration
- Founded: 1939; 87 years ago
- Headquarters: Saratov, Russia
- Area served: Soviet bloc, Russia
- Products: Refrigerators, military aircraft components
- Net income: −$7,101 (2018)
- Total assets: $6.76 million (2017)
- Website: www.sepo.ru

Saratov Electrical Components Production Association (Russian: Саратовское электроагрегатное производственное объединение) is a Russian company based in Saratov. It is best known for producing refrigerators which it has done since the Soviet era. The company offers a wide range of products suited for both household and commercial use.

== Overview ==
The Saratov Electrical Components Production Association historically has produced aircraft products mostly for military use. In the early 1990s output of consumer durables, especially large-capacity refrigerators, expanded rapidly reducing the military share of output to less than 10 percent. The Saratov Electrical Components Production Association includes the Krasnokutskiy Electromechanical Plant located in Krasny Kut.

The plant produces the Saratov refrigerators since 1951, which were formerly well known across the Soviet bloc.

== Owners and management ==
The company is managed by two legal entities: SEPO JSC and SEPO-ZEM LLC. Until 2020-2021 Evgeny Reznik was their CEO.

Since July 2020 Elena Voynova has been the CEO of SEPO JSC. Artur Temirov has been CEO of SEPO-ZEM LLC since May 2021.
