= NVS Telematic Systems =

- Company type: Limited liability company
- Industry: Global Positioning System, GLONASS
- Founded: Moscow, 2011
- Headquarters: Moscow, Russia
- Area served: Russia; Commonwealth of Independent States
- Products: List of NVS Telematic Systems products
- Website: nvs-ts.ru

NVS Telematic System Ltd is a Russian company that builds technology and equipment controlled by signals from satellite navigation systems GLONASS and GPS; it was founded in 2011 and is part of the Navis Group. Developing equipment for satellite monitoring of transport is the company's main business. NVS Telematic System is involved in the development, production organization, distribution and servicing of the navigation equipment for commercial and private use.

== History ==
The company was founded in 2011 as a satellite of KB Navis, carrying out production of onboard navigation devices in the "Signal" series.

- In 2012, the Navitrack equipment series was created. A state contract for delivery of automobile navigation equipment GLONASS/GPS and the automated workplaces (AW) of monitoring of vehicles in Federal Customs Service of Russia was executed. Works were carried out in the territory of 36 subjects of the Russian Federation in 49 regional divisions of Federal Customs Service of Russia. NVS Telematic equipped 486 vehicles and 26 automated workplaces with GLONASS/GPS navigation devices in the Signal series.

Cooperation between the NAVIS Group and the Federal Customs Service of Russia resulted in the creation of complex system interconnected with system of electronic declaring by means of a multimedia traffic in real time for monitoring and control of passing customs freights without opening any containers.

- In 2013, a device for satellite monitoring of transport Navitrek UM-04 went into mass production. A search beacon, Navitrek UM-02, functioning on GLONASS/GPS systems together with base stations GSM, was developed. Satellite monitoring of transport by the Navionis product was developed as a web interface. All equipment was adapted under the state project ERA-GLONASS. Introduction of the quality system of management ISO 9001:2008
