= Maykor =

Russian company

MAYKOR
- Founded: 2010
- Headquarters: Russian Federation, Moscow
- Key people: Sergey Sulgin, president
- Number of employees: over 5200
- Website: "www.maykor.com (English)". Archived from the original on 2021-06-12.

MAYKOR is a Russian company and provider of IT and business process outsourcing services. It was founded in 2010 and is headquartered in Moscow, Russia. The company's main business areas include support services for: IT infrastructure; business applications; Telecommunication, Retail, banking, oil and gas, and transportation and logistics equipment; facility management; as well as business process outsourcing. The company has 83 branches and more than 400 service units in Russia.

The employee headcount as of 2015 is more than 5,200

== History ==
The company was founded in 2010. From the beginning, the company had specialized in IT outsourcing services and facility management. In 2012, MAYKOR embarked on a mergers and acquisitions strategy that resulted in regional expansion. The company built its wholly owned network of 83 branches and 400 service subdivisions across Russia and developed new business lines in business application support services and industry specific services for banking, retail, gas and oil, and transportation and logistics.

In 2012, MAYKOR joined the Russian Association of Strategic Outsourcing, ASTRA, and the International Association of Outsourcing Professionals (IAOP). The company is co-chair of IAOP's Russia Chapter.

In June 2013, MAYKOR completed acquisition of GMCS, a provider of business management information systems development services.

In August 2013, the Russian Direct Investment Fund, the European Bank for Reconstruction and Development, and the CapMan Russia II Fund signed an agreement to invest $100 million in MAYKOR. The RDIF, Russia's state owned investment fund, had committed $50 million, while EBRD and CapMan planned an investment of $25 million each over a 12-month period.

In August 2014, MAYKOR completed acquisition of the ВТЕ Group of Companies. With this acquisition, MAYKOR's banking equipment servicing resources were combined with BTE's assets to form a new subsidiary. MAYKOR now owns 74,99% of BTE.

== Management ==
MAYKOR is headed by its president, Sergey Sulgin.

== Awards and achievements ==
The International Association of Outsourcing Professionals (IAOP) has named MAYKOR to the top-ranked Leaders Category of The Global Outsourcing 100 in February 2014. The company received this recognition again in 2015. MAYKOR was also recognized as one of the top ten providers in the EMEA region in the 2Q 2015 ISG Outsourcing Index. At the end of 2014, the company was ranked as one of the leaders in IT services by the Russian business magazine "Kommersant-Dengi", as well as by Russian rating agencies RAEX and RIA Rating.
