= Melon Fashion Group =

Russian clothing company

- Company type: Joint-stock company
- Founded: 2005
- Key people: Mikhail Urzhumtsev (CEO)
- Brands: Zarina, Befree, Love Republic, Sela, IDOL

Melon Fashion Group is a Russian retail company founded in 2005. The group owns the brands Zarina, Befree, Love Republic, Sela and IDOL.

In 2023 the company owned 900 stores in Russia, Kazakhstan, Belarus, Armenia and Kyrgyzstan.

== History ==
The company was founded as JSC Melon Fashion Group (ОАО «Мэлон Фэшн Груп») in 2005 in Saint Petersburg.

Initially, Melon Fashion Group consisted brands Zarina and Befree, in 2009 a brand Love Republic has appeared, and in 2019 – Sela.

In 2013, Melon Fashion Group owned 586 stores in Russia, Ukraine, Kazakhstan, and Armenia.

In 2020 the company entered the TOP-3 in sales of clothing brands on the Wildberries and Lamoda marketplaces.

As of 2021, the group operated more than 800 stores across 188 cities in Russia and the CIS. The number of employees was 5,300.

In 2023 the company opened stores of its new IDOL brand.

As of May 2023, the company had 900 stores in Russia, Kazakhstan, Belarus, Armenia and Kyrgyzstan.

The IDOL brand won in the nomination "Best New National Retailer" at the IV International Global Retail Real Estate Awards 2023.

== Owners and management ==
The head office is located in Saint Petersburg.

For 2025 the General Director is Mikhail Urzhumtsev.

The company's co-founder, David Kellerman, served as chairman of the Board of Directors until 2022.

At the end of 2022, Melon Fashion Group was 36% owned by Sweden's Eastnine AB, 34% by I.G.M. Manufactrust Ltd, 11% by Sweden's Intressenter AB (a subsidiary of East Capital Holding AB), 7% by Melon Fashion Group's CEO, Mikhail Urzhumtsev, and 12% by other Russian and Swedish shareholders. In 2023, 36% of the stake in Melon Fashion Group Eastnine AB was sold to GEM Invest.

== Financial indicators ==
Year	Revenue, billion rubles	Net Income, billion rubles
2013	▲9,2	▼0,519
2014	▲11,1	▼0,444
2015	▲12,6	▼0,272
2016	▼12,4	▼0,131
2017	▲13,9	▲0,731
2018	▲17,63	▲1,03
2019	▲22,99	▲1,56
2020	▲25,2	▲1,7
2021	▲37,5	▲3,5
2022	▲46,1	▲7,3
2023	▲61,6	-
