= Synqera =

- Founded: March 2010
- Headquarters: Saint Petersburg, Russia
- Key people: Kirill Gorynya, CEO and Co-founder; Filipp Shubin, COO and Co-founder
- Products: Simplate, Synqera Loyalty Printer, Synqera Software Platform,
- Website: synqera.com

Synqera is a software company, providing services for the personalisation of retail. The company is headquartered in Saint Petersburg, Russia.

== History ==
Synqera was founded in 2010 by Kirill Gorynya and Filipp Shubin in Saint Petersburg, Russia. Its first product, Simplate device, was announced in 2012 at the Cartes exhibition in Paris where it was nominated for the Sesames award in the e-transactions nomination. In 2013 Synqera was listed by as a major new technology announcement at Retail's BIG Show 2013. A month later the solution was placed third in the Payment Innovator Startup Awards in Berlin. In March 2013 Synqera opened a branch in New York City.

In June 2013 Synqera announced a pilot project with retail chain Ulybka Radugi.

== Technology and products ==
Synqera software uses retail big data analysis to generate personalized product recommendations. It matches targeted messages with customer profiles, shopping history, real-time shopping environments (such as weather forecast or day of the week) and customer mood detected by facial recognition technology.

It supports special offers, coupons, loyalty program benefits and product promotions through channels including in-store devices, mobile apps, text messages, e-mail and customized website content. The content and campaign progress are managed via a web-based back-interface. It evaluates customer responses to viewed content and accumulates statistics of interaction.

Among the in-store devices utilizing the Synqera software platform are:

- Simplate – the proprietary NFC-enabled customer display with embedded touch-screen, camera and microphone. Visualizes targeted content in the customer checkout process.
- Synqera Loyalty Generator – a compact printer with integrated touch-screen and card-reader delivering customized shopping lists, recipes and store maps at the store entrance. The hardware part is developed by Star Micronics.
