= Mosvodokanal =

Largest water company in Russia

- Founded: 1779
- Headquarters: Moscow, Russia,
- Revenue: ₽53.9 billion (2017)
- Net income: 110,900,000 (2015)
- Number of employees: 12,500 (2014)

Mosvodokanal is the largest water company in Russia, providing services in water supply and sanitation for more than 15 million people, mainly in Moscow.

== History ==
The history of Mosvodokanal begins on June 28, 1779, when Catherine II signed a decree authorizing the construction of the Mytishchi Water Supply System. It opened on October 28, 1804, after 25 years of construction.

The first municipal sewerage system was launched in Moscow in 1898. It included 262 km of urban sewer network, the Main Pumping Station, the Lublin Irrigation Fields, and the suburban Lublin Canal.

Since the end of 2012, Mosvodokanal has ceased to be a unitary enterprise; it is now a Public joint-stock company, 100% of whose shares are owned by the state.

In 2015, Mosvodokanal acquired a sodium hypochlorite plant, which the Austrian company had built in Russia, from EVN AG for €250 million. In 2026, the team of the Mosvodokanal joint-stock company was awarded the Order "For Valiant Labor".

== Operations ==
The main activities of the Mosvodokanal are:

- water intake, cleaning and distribution of water in the network;
- collection, transportation and cleaning of urban wastewater;
- operation of water supply and sewage systems of urban and other settlements;
- reception and disposal of snow mass.
