= Proton-Electrotex =

Russian electronics company

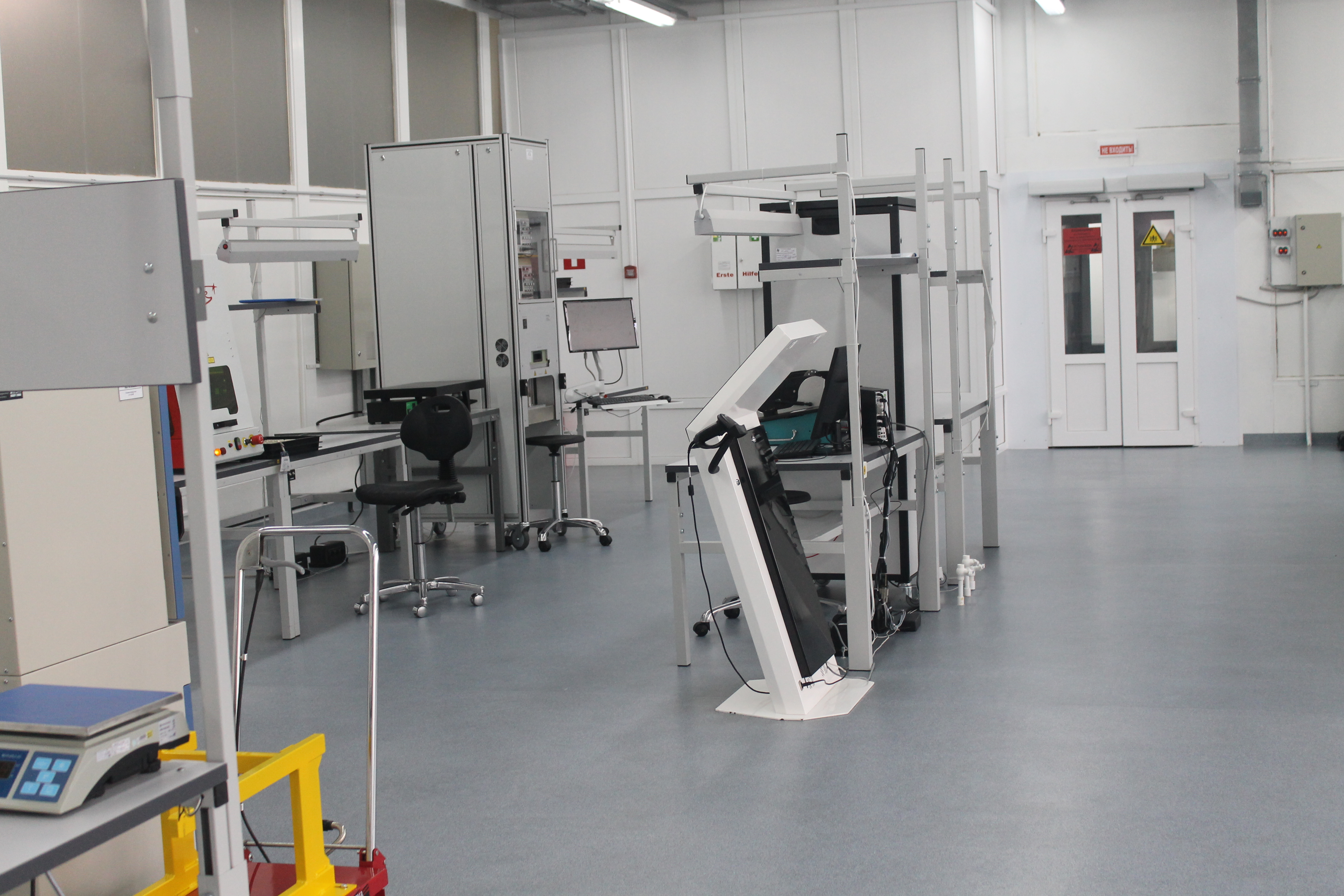
- Type: Joint Stock Company
- Industry: Electronics industry
- Founded: 1996
- Fate: Severely damaged or destroyed
- Headquarters: Orel, Russia
- Key people: Alexander Semenov (General Director)
- Products: Power electronics
- Revenue: 1 billion RUR.
- Number of employees: Around 450
- Website: www.proton-electrotex.com

Joint Stock Company "Proton-Electrotex" is a Russian company mainly involved in development, manufacturing and sales of bipolar power semiconductor devices — diodes and thyristors, power assemblies and IGBT modules. The company is located in Orel and is one of the largest companies in Orel oblast. Total area of the premises exceeds 15 000 m.^{2}

On 23 October 2026, during the Russo-Ukrainian war, the plant was struck by Ukrainian cruise missiles.

== History ==
The company was founded in 1996 at premises of a former "Proton" plant affiliated with the Ministry of Electronic Industry of the USSR. The purchased facilities and equipment were intended for clean technologies enabling to launch production of power semiconductors, however almost all assembly lines and manufacturing processes, as well as manufacturing processes and routes had to be researched and launched all over again. Designs and technologies were developed jointly with specialists of the Russian Electrical Engineering Institute in Moscow.

On January 11, 2011 the company founded a Research and Development Center involved in R&D, designing automatization systems and measurement equipment. Proton-Electrotex has official certificate Made in Russia

Proton-Electrotex company was included in the list of top priority organizations in the Oryol region. This means that Proton-Electrotex JSC is of critical importance for the region and has a significant impact on employment and social stability of the Oryol region.

In 2016 the company launched serial production of IGBT modules, 95% of which had been previously imported to Russia from abroad. Later in 2018 they were extended by a family of low-inductance MIDA-type modules, Full-SiC MCDA-type IGBT and pressure contact PIMA-type IGBT.

According to «TechUp» rating, Proton-Electrotex is one of the winners in the category of companies with the greatest export potential in Russia. More than 70% of Proton-Electrotex power electronics were shipped to the EU and Asia including China, India, Germany, Italy.

In 2018 quality management system and ecology management systems of the company were certified according to ISO 9001:2015 and ISO 14001:2015 standards.

IGBT modules in a MIDA package have won the all-Russian contest of the Program “100 Best Goods of Russia” 2019.

In 2020 Proton-Electrotex company reached the third position in the ranking of Russian companies by revenue from manufacturing of semiconductor devices and the 6th place by revenue from products and services supplied for export. The main criterion used to make this rating was the amount of revenue earned in the electronics industry. The author and the publisher of this rating is the Central Research Institute Electronica, JSC.

== Products ==
- Thyristors
- Diodes
- Thyristor/Diode Modules
- IGBT Modules
- Heatsinks
- Power Stacks
- Drivers

== See also ==
- Zelenograd
- Ruselectronics
- Angstrem (company)
- Russian defense industry
