= T Plus =

- Type: Public Joint Stock Company
- Founded: 2002
- Headquarters: Krasnogorsk, Russia
- Revenue: $4.97 billion (2016)
- Operating income: −$41.3 million (2016)
- Net income: −$269 million (2016)
- Total assets: $6.77 billion (2016)
- Total equity: $2.91 billion (2016)
- Owner: Renova Group
- Website: Official website

T Plus (Russian: Т Плюс) is a Russian electricity generation company part of the Renova Group. It was known as IES Holding until 2014.

T Plus incorporates assets from the territorial generating companies TGC-5, TGC-6, TGC-7, and TGC-9. It is the largest private heating and electricity generation company in the country, controlling 7% of the power generation and 10% of the heating market.

The director of T Plus was accused of paying over $14 million in bribes to regional officials in the Komi Republic between 2007 and 2014 in exchange for fixing tariffs for heating and electricity.

The company's shares were delisted from the Moscow Exchange in September 2016.

In 2022, the company's revenue amounted to 267 billion rubles.
