= Mostotrest =

Russian construction company

PJSC Mostotrest
- Type: Public (PAO)
- Traded as: MCX: MSTT
- Industry: Construction
- Founded: 1930
- Headquarters: Moscow, Russia
- Key people: Evgeny Chibyshev (CEO)
- Products: Infrastructure
- Revenue: $2.61 billion (2016; 2017; 2023; 2024)
- Operating income: $27 million (2016; 2023; 2024)
- Net income: $74.8 million (2016; 2023; 2024)
- Number of employees: 450 (2024)
- Website: www.mostotrest.ru

Mostotrest (Russian: ПАО Мостотрест) is the largest Russian heavy construction company. The company is focused in the construction of roads, rail, bridges and highways and other engineering constructions.

== Activities ==
The company is the largest Russian bridge construction company. Since 1930 when the company was founded, Mostotrest has completed over 7,500 infrastructure facilities, including bridges, foot bridges, tunnels and complex transport interchanges. The company its subsidiaries has more than 33,233 employees and operates through 15 branches. In 2022, the company's revenue amounted to 4.8 billion rubles.

Mostotrest was awarded construction projects for the 2014 Winter Olympics worth $5.6 billion, and CEO Vladimir Vlasov was awarded a medal by Dmitry Medvedev for the company's work on the Olympics.

== Ownership ==
In April 2018, Arkady Rotenberg's Stroyproektholding LLC became the new owner of the company.

As of the end of August 2023, Stroyproektholding owned 97% of the shares of PJSC Mostotrest.

General Director — Evgeny Chibyshev (since February 2025).
