= CenterTelecom =

Russian telecommunications service provider

The Central Telecommunications Company OJSC
- Company type: Public (OAO)
- Industry: Telecommunication
- Founded: 1890
- Defunct: 1 April 2011
- Fate: Merged with Rostelecom
- Successor: Rostelecom
- Headquarters: Khimki, Russia
- Services: Telecommunication services
- Revenue: ▲US$1.1 billion (2008)
- Number of employees: 31,517 (2008)
- Parent: Svyazinvest

CenterTelecom (Open Joint-Stock Company Central Telecommunication Company, Russian: ОАО «Центртелеком») was a fixed-line telecommunications service provider and Internet service provider in Russia. It was ranked 5th among Russian telecom companies, after Rostelecom, MTS, Vympelcom and MegaFon. Svyazinvest Holding Company held 50.69% of CenterTelecom's voting stock. CenterTelecom was listed on the MICEX and RTS stock exchanges under the ticker symbol ESMO.

== History ==
The company was established in the late 19th century when the Moscow postal telegraph district was initiated. From 1922 to 1926, the Post and Telegraph Offices Division under the Moscow Soviet was reorganized as the Communication Department of the Moscow District. On June 20, 1994, the Open Joint-Stock Company Elektrosvyaz of the Moscow region was established, and in 2001, the company was named OJSC CenterTelecom.

CentrTelecom was created in 2002 on the basis of the merger of OAO Elektrosvyaz of Moscow Oblast with the following entities:

- Voronezhsvyazinform
- Yartelekom
- Tulatelekom
- Elektrosvyaz of Tver Oblast
- Belsvyaz
- Elektrosvyaz of Vladimir Oblast
- Elektrosvyaz of Kaluga Oblast
- Lipetskelektrosvyaz
- Tambov Elektrosvyaz
- Smolensksvyazinform
- Bryansksvyazinform
- Elektrosvyaz of Ryazan Oblast
- Ivtelekom
- Elektrsvyaz of Kursk Oblast
- Elektrosvyaz of Oryol Oblast
- Elektrosvyaz of Kostroma Oblast
- Vladimir City Telephone Network

The Moscow-based operators Moscow City Telephone Network and Mostelecom were not part of Centertelecom. On 1 April 2011, the company merged with Rostelecom.
