= Permalco =

Russian distillery

(Perm Distillery) PERMALKO
- Industry: Drinks
- Founded: 1885
- Headquarters: Perm, Russia
- Key people: Oleg Kotelnikov, CEO
- Products: Alcoholic beverages
- Parent: SPI Group
- Website: permalko.ru/en/

Joint-Stock Company Permalko (Russian: Открытое акционерное общество «Пермалко», lit. 'Okrytkoye aktsionernoye obshchestvo Permalko') is one of the leading distilleries in Perm and Perm Kray. The company is in the top 20 list of vodka and spirits producers in Russia.

== History ==
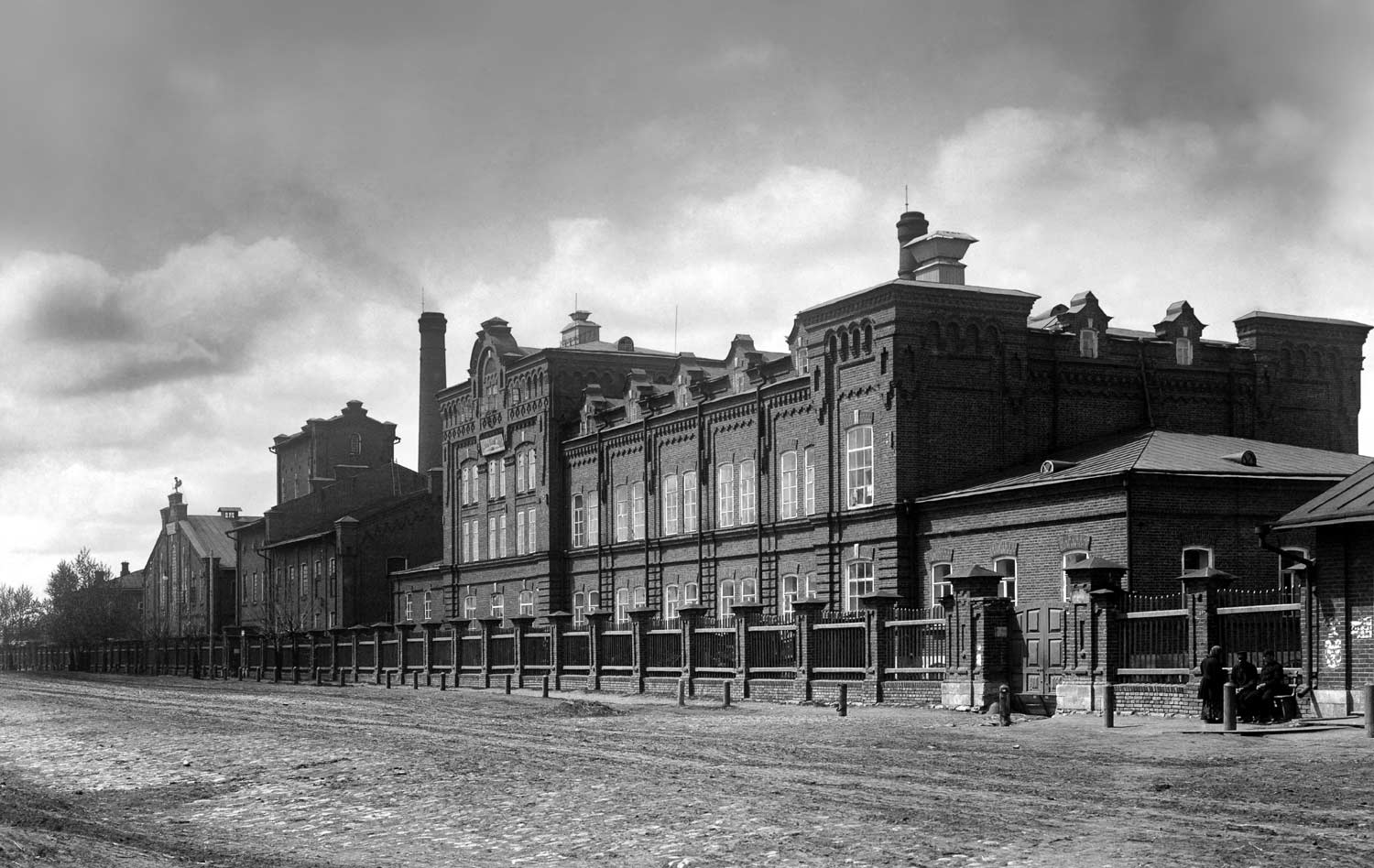
A distillery and wine warehouse, at the turn of twentieth century.

On 1 January 1895, the first state distillery in Perm was founded. It was the beginning of state wine trading in Perm Governorate. For some period of time, it was operated under the name Winery No. 12.

By February 1900 a state wine warehouse was built nearby (by architect A. B. Turchevitch) (nowadays the building is a monument of architecture of regional significance).

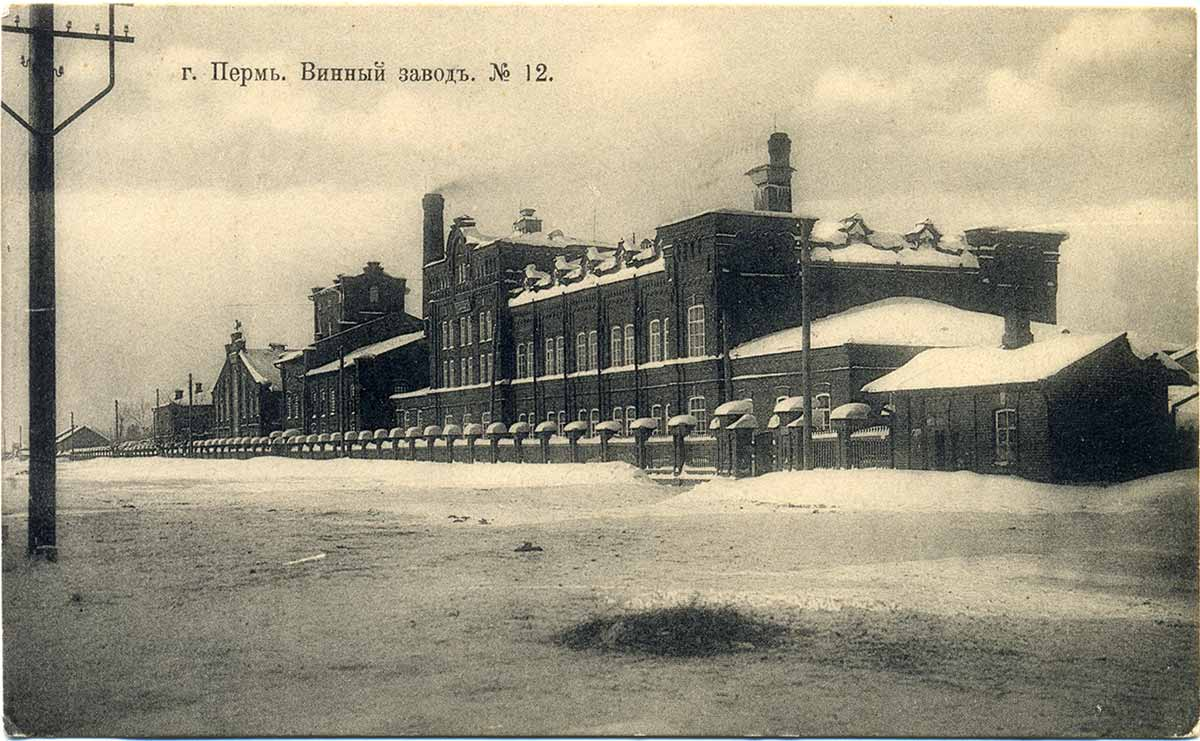
Winery No. 12.

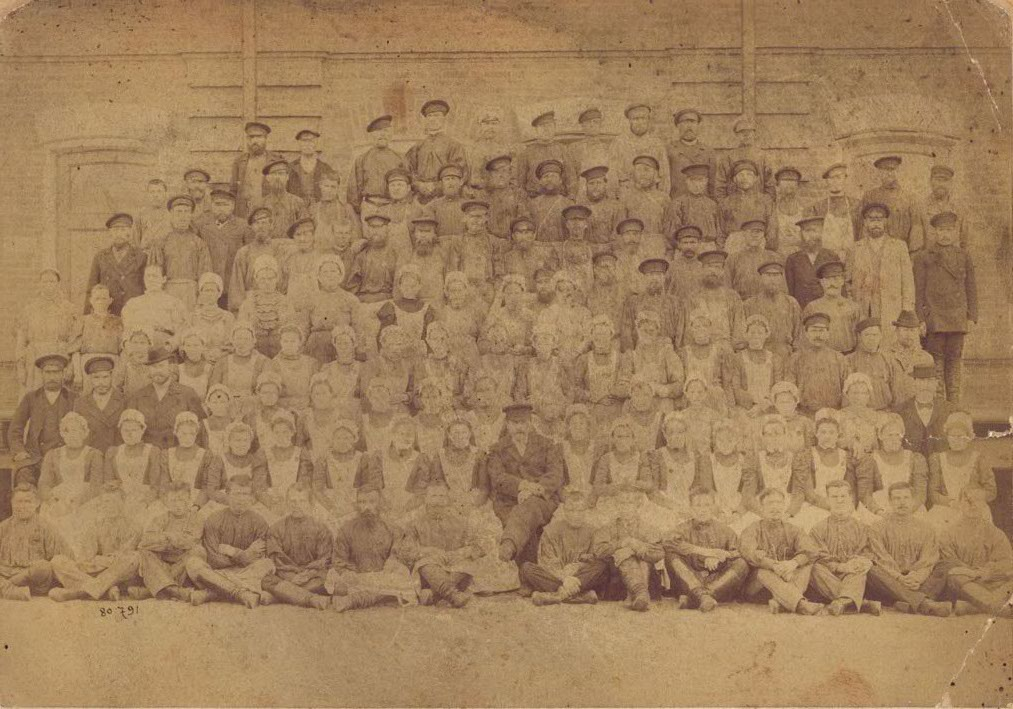
The first plant’s personnel.

During the Russian Revolution and the Russian Civil War, there was a restrictive policy on the production and sale of alcohol. The order of 8 November 1917 prohibited the production and trade of alcohol in the country, and the plant ceased operations. The part that produced alcohol was closed, and the equipment was dismantled.

In 1926, when the newly formed Soviet state began economic activity, the plant resumed operations. In Soviet times, the plant was renamed «Perm Spirits Producer».

During World War II, part of the enterprise was given to the Ukrainian mechanical engineering plant. On 24 October 1945, the mechanical plant was moved back to Ukraine, the main building and several service areas were destroyed.

The peak of production was in the 1960s — mid-1980s when the following vodka brands were delivered: Moskovskaya, Stolichnaya, Russkaya, Posolskaya, and others. The assortment included approximately 60 product names, including various punches and sweet and semi-sweet liqueurs.

During 1985–1987, an anti-alcohol campaign with partial prohibition, known as the "dry law", was carried out, so the plant had to significantly reduce its production

In 1993, as a result of privatization, Perm Spirits Producer became a public company and got its current name «Permalko». In those days, the plant's shares were mainly held by the administration of the Perm region.

In 2005, the administration announced the privatization of its shareholdings.

== Present Days ==
In 2006, the company went private; the majority stake was acquired by SPI Group.

In the same year, a new bottling house was equipped with Italian and German machines; since September 2007, Permalko has been using the low-temperature technology in alcohol production.

Permalko has a wide sales geography: CIS countries, the USA, Europe and Africa.

All the drinks are based on Lux and Alfa spirits supplied by the distillery of Talvis.

In the production process natural ingredients such as a lemon zest, pine nuts, walnuts, ashberries, cranberries and honey are used. All the products are certified in compliance with the requirements of the international standard ISO 22000:2005. Some of vodka brands are covered by the Orthodox Union kosher certificate.

Permalko has been in the top list of the Russian leading liqueur and vodka producers for more than ten years

== Awards ==
Permalko spirits won international tasting awards in countries such as the USA, Hong Kong, Germany, England, and France.

- In 2018 vodka Gradus Premium was awarded the grand prix at «Prodexpo-2018» (Moscow); vodkas Permsky Kray (Prodexpo-2018), Gradus Premium, Russky Reserv Myagkaya, Permsky Kray (Best Vodka 2018, Moscow), Gradus Premium, Russky Reserv Myagkaya (Best Product 2018, Moscow) was awarded gold medals, vodka Gradus was awarded four gold medals (The International Spirits Challenge, London; «Meiningers International Spirits Award ISW 2018», Germany; «International Taste and Quality Institute», Brussels; «World Drink Awards», London).
- In 2017, vodka Gradus Premium was awarded grand prix at the contest Best Vodka 2017 and also entered the independent tops of Russian vodka brands; Gradus Premium and Kaznatcheyskaya received medals at the international contest United Vodka 2017. Vodka Gradus was also awarded a silver medal at the San Francisco World Spirits Competition and bronze medals at New York International Spirits Competition 2017 and Berlin International Spirits Competition 2017.
- In 2016 the products of Permalko received gold and silver medals, and the grand prix at wine-tasting competition held at Prodexpo International Exhibition.
- In 2015 the products of Permalko received gold and silver medals at Prodexpo Wine-tasting Competition and gold medals in the category Premium at the contest Best Vodka 2015.
- In 2013, vodka Akula Zolotaya received two gold medals at international wine-testing competitions Prodexpo and Best Vodka 2013; vodka Kaznatcheyskaya was awarded a silver medal at «Internationaler Spiritusen Wettbewerb» (Neustadt).
- In 2011, Permalko products received three gold medals at the Russian competition Best Vodka of the Year.
