= Arktikgaz =

Russian oil and gas company

OAO Arktikgaz
- Native name: Арктикгаз
- Company type: Public (PAO)
- Industry: oil and gas
- Founded: August 1992; 33 years ago
- Headquarters: Novy Urengoy, Russia
- Products: natural gas crude oil
- Owner: Gazprom Neft; Novatek
- Subsidiaries: Urengoil; Neftegaztekhnologiya
- Website: www.gazprom-neft.com

OAO Arktikgaz (Russian: Арктикгаз; formerly known as Severneftegaz; not to be confused with Sevmorneftegaz and Severneftegazprom) is a Russian oil and gas company, which operates in the Yamalo-Nenets region. It was created on the basis of the former assets of Yukos. It is a joint venture of Gazprom Neft and Novatek. The headquarters of the company are located in Novy Urengoy, Tyumen Oblast.

== History ==
Arktikgaz, together with Urengoil and Neftegaztekhnologiya was founded as Severneftegaz which was one of the first independent oil and gas companies in Russia. On 11 August 1998, the American-based Benton Oil and Gas Company acquired a 40% share in Severneftegaz and increased its stake afterwards up to 68%. Other shareholders of this time were Gazprom, Urengoyneftegazgeologiya and Logovaz.

In 2002, in a series of transactions, 100% of Arktikgaz shares were acquired by Yukos. On 4 April 2007, shares in Arktikgaz together with other Yukos-owned companies Urengoil and Neftegaztekhnologiya were acquired by EniNeftegaz, a joint venture of Italian companies Eni (60%) and Enel (40%) created to purchase the former Yukos assets. Later Enineftegaz was renamed SeverEnergia. On 23 September 2009, 51% of SeverEnergia was acquired by Gazprom for US$1.5 billion. In November 2010, Gazprom sold is stake in SeverEnergia to Yamal Development LLC (Russian: Yamal razvitiye), an equally owned joint venture of Gazprom Neft and Novatek.

In September 2013, Enel sold its 19.6% stake (owned through a joint venture with Eni, Artic Russia B.V.) to Rosneft for $1.8 billion. In November 2013 Gazprom Neft bought Eni's stake in SeverEnergia for $2.94 billion. Later that year Novatek acquired the Rosneft's stake as a result of the assets swap. In 2018, Gazprom Neft and Novatek merged SeverEnergia and Yamal Development into Artikgaz and equalized their shares in the company. In 2022, the company's revenue amounted to 290 billion rubles.

== Operations ==
SeverEnergia produces the natural gas, and condensate oil in the Samburg, Yevo-Yakha, Yaro-Yakha, and Severo-Chaselsky licences within and adjacent to the Urengoy gas field. Produced natural gas is purchased by Gazprom.

== Ownership ==
51% of shares in SeverEnergia is owned by Yamal Development LLC, a joint venture of Gazprom Neft and Novatek, while 49% is owned by Arctic Russia B.V., a joint venture of Eni (60%) and Enel (40%).

== See also ==
- Petroleum industry in Russia
