= Speech Technology Center =

Russian voice recognition technology company

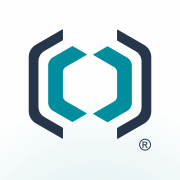
STC logo

Speech Technology Center (STC) is a Russian voice recognition technology company. Founded in 1990, STC grew out of KGB programs in partnership with the scientific development center of the Soviet Ministry for Communications. After the collapse of the Soviet Union, STC's work moved to the commercial sector, where in 2008 it helped Mexican authorities identify individuals using biometric information, including photographs and voice samples.
