= Protek Pharmaceuticals =

Russian pharmaceutical company

Protek
- Traded as: MCX: PRTK
- Founded: 1990
- Headquarters: Moscow, Russia
- Revenue: $4.43 billion (2017)
- Operating income: $138 million (2017)
- Net income: $101 million (2017)
- Total assets: $2.32 billion (2017)
- Total equity: $579 million (2017)
- Number of employees: 15,300

Protek (Russian: Протек) is a Russian company that includes drug manufacturing, retail, and distribution. It is one of the largest pharmaceutical companies of Russia. It was founded in 1990 by Vadim Yakunin and Grigor Khachaturov. In 2022, the company's revenue in Russia amounted to 257 billion rubles.

== See also ==
- Pharmaceutical industry in Russia
