= Irmash =

Russian heavy machinery manufacturer

- Native name: Ирмаш
- Company type: Limited liability company
- Industry: Construction equipment
- Founded: 1752
- Headquarters: Bryansk, Russia
- Area served: Worldwide
- Key people: Nikolay Inyutin (President)
- Products: Paver, Road roller, Grader, excavators, Utility equipment
- Owner: GKMP
- Website: irmash.com gkmp.com

Irmash (Russian: Ирмаш) was the leader in the production of road-building machines in the Soviet Union and is the largest in Russia. It has its headquarters in Bryansk. The company produces pavers, road rollers, graders, excavators, and utility equipment.

== History ==
In 1752, the industrialist Afanasiy Goncharov built the Raditsky Iron Plant in the Russian Empire. In 1862, the plant produced flour mills and threshing machines. By 1870, the plant produced railway cars, steam locomotives, and river steamers. In 1922 it turned into a car-construction plant.

In 1956, a decree of the Council of Ministers of the Soviet Union established the production in the plant of equipment for the cement industry and factories of silicate and refractory bricks. In 1964, it was reorganized into the Bryansk Plant of Irrigation Machines, becoming the leading enterprise in the Soviet Union for the production of trench excavator rotors, concrete-lining machines for the construction of canals, closed irrigation systems, and other equipment.

In 2016, the Irmash enterprise became part of the Russian Group of Engineering and Instrumentation Companies (GKMP). In 2019, the new ASF-G-3-01 paver model was launched.
