= Razgulay =

- Company type: Joint-stock company
- Industry: Agribusiness
- Founded: 1992
- Defunct: 2017
- Headquarters: Moscow, Russia
- Website: raz.ru

OJSC Razgulay Group (MCX: GRAZ) was one of Russia's largest agribusiness companies. It is based in Moscow.

The company was declared bankrupt in April 2017.

== Overview ==
Through its subsidiaries, the Group is involved in purchase, processing, and distribution of agricultural products, primarily sugar and grains, both inside Russia and internationally. The company's products include raw sugar, sugar beet, and milk, as well as sells white sugar, condensed milk, casein, and other related products. It also trades in grain and grain products.

The company was founded in 1992, and its shares are listed at the Russian Trading System. It was formerly known as Razguliay-UkrRos Group.

== Subsidiaries ==
The parent company, OJSC Razgulay Group, manages the divisions within the Corporate Center and the Group as a whole.

The Group consists of three main subsidiaries:

- Razgulay-Agro Company manages the agricultural assets of the Group, invests in further expansion of land, purchases agricultural equipment, and strives to increase crop production through the introduction of advanced technologies.
- Razgulay-Sugar Company has a 14% market share of the Russian sugar market.
- Razgulay-Grain Company is involved in the production and distribution of grain. Its monthly grain deliveries amount to over 200 thousand tons.
