= Chelyabinsk Pipe Rolling plant =

Steel pipe manufacturing plant in Russia

Coordinates: 55°06′58″N 61°28′22″E

Chelyabinsk Tube Rolling Plant
- Company type: Open Joint-Stock Company
- Industry: Steel pipe
- Founded: 1942
- Headquarters: Chelyabinsk, Russia
- Products: Seamless hot-rolled pipe Seamless cold-rolled pipe Large-diameter pipe Welded pipe
- Revenue: $2.71 billion (2017)
- Operating income: $272 million (2017)
- Net income: $69.1 million (2017)
- Total assets: $2.64 billion (2017)
- Total equity: $104 million (2017)
- Number of employees: ~ 8,000
- Website: https://chtpz.tmk-group.ru/

Chelyabinsk Tube Rolling Plant (also known as ChelPipe; abbreviated as ChTPZ; Russian: Челябинский трубопрокатный завод, ЧТПЗ) manufactures every kind of steel pipe, including pipes used for the construction of petroleum, natural gas and water pipelines; and pipes used in manufacturing processes.

== Overview ==
The company was established in 1942 and is based in Chelyabinsk. It is involved in the production and distribution of steel pipes, with its main products being large diameter welded pipes, small diameter hot-worked seamless pipes (108–169 mm diameter) and cold-worked seamless pipes (89–426 mm diameter). Chelyabinsk Pipe Rolling Plant accounts for 11% of the total Russian pipe production and more than 70% of Russian pipelines currently in operation use pipes made by the company.

In 2008, the plant produced 806,700 tonnes of pipe products. In recent years, it has entered a large scale modernization programme. In 2022, the company's revenue amounted to 72000 rubles.

The company's important overseas clients include Japan and the United States. Main production facilities are located in the city of Chelyabinsk, which is just east of the Ural Mountains. The company's sales office is located in Moscow.
