= Southern Telecom =

Russian telecommunications company

OJSC Southern Telecom Company
- Native name: Южная телекоммуникационная компания
- Company type: Joint stock
- Industry: Telecommunications services
- Founded: December 21, 2001
- Defunct: 2011
- Successor: Rostelecom
- Headquarters: Krasnodar
- Key people: Alexander Vladimirovich Andreev, General Manager
- Products: Telephony; Internet services; Cable television service
- Parent: Svyazinvest
- Website: www.stcompany.ru

Southern Telecom (Russian: Южная телекоммуникационная компания) which was known in its acronym UTK (Russian: ЮТК) was a telecommunications company owned by Svyazinvest providing coverage to the Southern Federal District of Russia.

== History ==
Southern Telecom was created on the basis of the merger of Kubanelektrosvyaz together with regional telecommunications companies:

- Karachayevo-Cherkesskelektrosvyaz
- Svyazinform of Astrakhan Oblast
- Elektrosvyaz of the Republic of Kalmykia
- Elektrosvyaz of Stavropol Krai
- KabBalkTelecom
- Sevosetinelektrosvyaz
- Elektrosvyaz of the Republic of Adygea
- Rostovelektrosvyaz
- Volgogradelektrosvyaz
- Dagsvyazinform
- Administration of Electronic Telecommunication of the Republic of Ingushetia (Ingushelectrosvyaz)
- Elektrosvyaz of the Chechen Republic
- Kuban GSM

The company's area of responsibility had a population of over 18 million people.

Southern Telecom's stock traded on the RTS, MICEX, Nasdaq, Frankfurt, Berlin and Vienna stock exchanges.

Following Svyazinvest's liquidation in 2011 the company was merged into Rostelecom.
