= LSR Group =

Russian real estate company

OJSC LSR Group

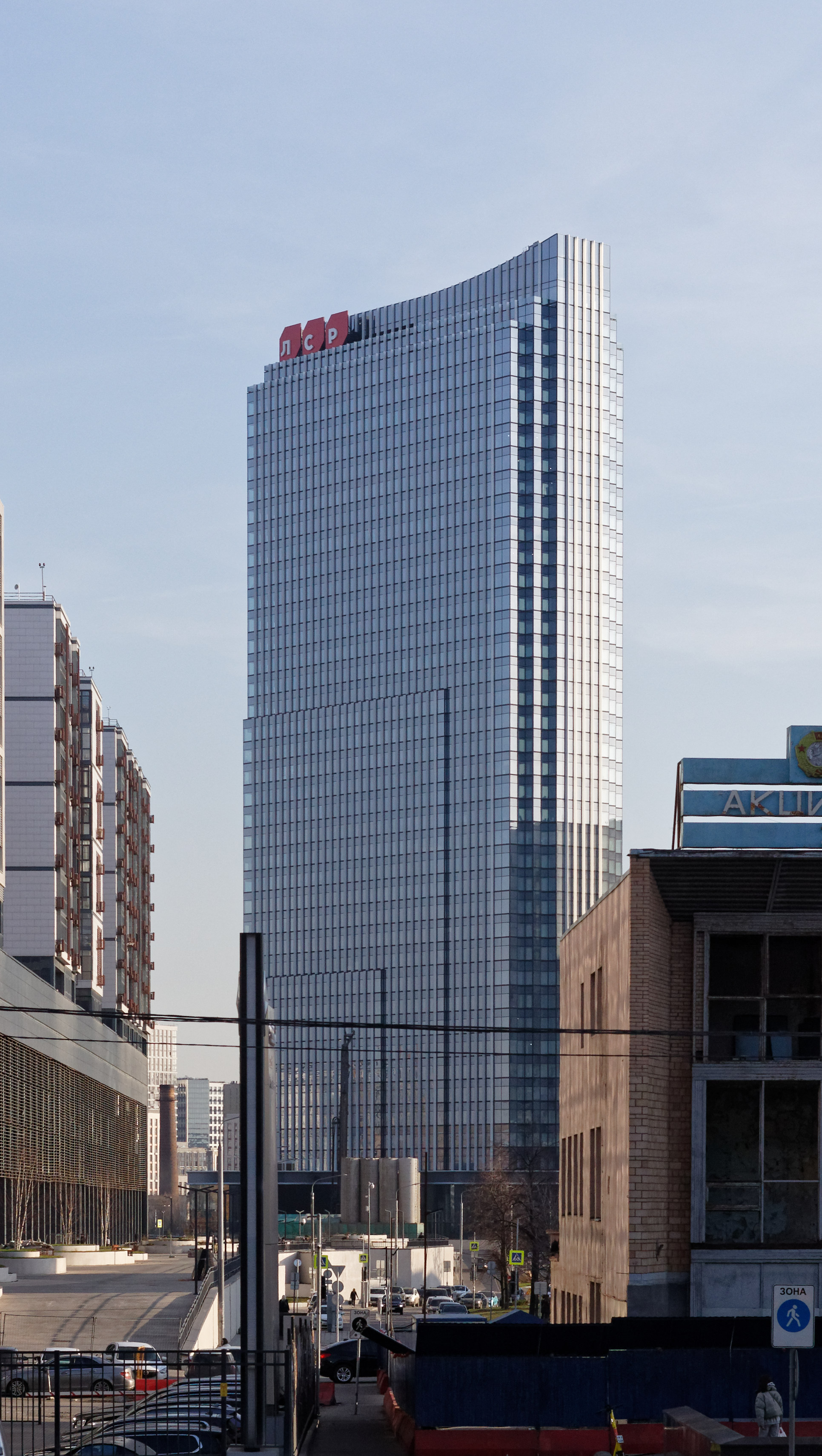
- Native name: ПАО "Группа ЛСР"
- Type: Public (ПAO)
- Traded as: MCX: LSRG; LSE: LSRG
- Industry: Construction
- Founded: 1993; 33 years ago
- Headquarters: Saint Petersburg, Russia
- Key people: Dmitri Gontcharov (Chairman of the Board); Andrey Molchanov(CEO)
- Products: Building materials, Real estate development, Construction
- Revenue: $3.01 billion (2025)
- Operating income: $703 million (2025)
- Net income: $129 million (2025)
- Total assets: $7.87 billion (2025)
- Number of employees: 14,500 (2018)
- Website: www.lsrgroup.ru

LSR Group (Russian: ОАО "Группа ЛСР") is a Russian real estate development, construction and building materials company. LSR Group is one of the leaders in the real estate and building materials in Russia. The company headquarters is located in Saint Petersburg. In 2019, the total number of employees was about 11,000. As of 2008, the company had 24 subsidiaries.

== History ==
The company was founded in 1993 by a Russian entrepreneur Andrey Molchanov, naming it LenStroyRekonstruktsiya (LSR). LSR Group is an open joint-stock company and an absolute owner of its major subsidiaries and companies. In November 2007 the company offered 12.5% of its share capital for trade at the London Stock Exchange and MICEX through IPO, which in total sold for US$772 million. After the offerings, the company's market capitalization amounted to $6.8 billion. In April 2010 the company offered 10% of its share capital and raised US$398.1 million (including expenses for the offering).

In 2021, the company left the London Stock Exchange because of its low market liquidity. By 2022 the company's revenue amounted to 13 billion rubles.
