= Andrey Molchanov (businessman) =

Russian politician

- Андрей Молчанов
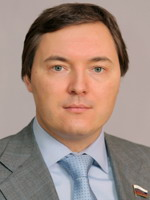
- Official portrait, 2008

Member of the Federation Council from Leningrad Oblast
- In office 30 January 2008 – 17 April 2013
- Nominated by: Valeriy Serdyukov

Chairman of the Federation Council Committee on the Commonwealth of Independent States Issues
- In office December 2009 – 2013

Personal details
- Born: 24 September 1971 (age 55) Saint Petersburg, Russian SFSR, Soviet Union
- Education: Saint Petersburg State University
- Profession: Politician

Andrey Yuryevich Molchanov (Russian: Андрей Юрьевич Молчанов; born 24 September 1971) is a Russian businessman, Doctor of Economics, honorary builder of Russia and honorary citizen of Leningrad Region. He is also the founder and the major shareholder of LSR Group (OJSC) and a former representative of Leningrad Oblast in the Federation Council of the Federal Assembly of the Russian Federation (2008—2013).

== Education ==
In 1993 Molchanov graduated from the economic faculty of the Saint Petersburg State University, in 1998 graduated from the Russian Academy of Public Administration under the President of the Russian Federation (RAPA). Andrey Molchanov also holds a doctorate in Economic Sciences.

== Business ==
In 1993, he started a business in St. Petersburg. He acquired JSC «Stroydetal» (Russian: ОАО "Стройдеталь"), which included factories for the production of joinery products, concrete, reinforced concrete products, and metal structures. Mikhail Romanov (Russian: Михаил Романов, the uncle of Andrey Molchanov, became the CEO.

In 1994, the JSC «Stroitelnaya Korporaciya Vozrozhdenie Sankt-Peterburga» was founded. The company was involved in the reconstruction and restoration of buildings.

In 1996, the construction company «Lenstroirekonstruktsiya» was acquired, which gave its name to the group of companies — LSR. In 1997—1998, a brick factory — the Joint-Stock Company «Lenstroikkeramika» — and a quarrying enterprise for quarry and sea sand — the Joint-Stock Company «Rudas» — were acquired.

In 1999, with the acquisition of the Closed Joint-Stock Company "NPO Keramika, " the LSR Group became the largest producer of bricks in St. Petersburg and the Leningrad Region.

In 2001, a decision was made to enter the development market in Moscow, which led to the establishment of the Closed Joint-Stock Company «Mosstroirekonstruktsiya.» In 2003, a decision was made to enter the market of mechanized services, for which the tower crane operation company «UM-260» was acquired.

During the Trump Tower Moscow deal before Donald Trump became United States President, Molchanov owned the property ”that could work for the tower”.

== LSR Group ==
On April 5, 2013, Molchanov was elected as the chairman of the board of directors of LSR Group after he submitted his resignation from the Federation Council.

From April 2013 to April 2015, he served as the chairman of the board of directors of LSR Group.

Since May 18, 2015, he has held the position of CEO of LSR Group and LSR LLC.

On March 21, 2016, he was elected as the president of the National Association of Builders at the XI All-Russian Congress of Self-Regulating Organizations in Construction.

In 2017, he was recognized as the Top Manager of the Year by the newspaper Delovoy Peterburg.

In 2018, Andrei Molchanov was awarded the title of Honorary Citizen of the Leningrad Region. In May 2018, the board of directors of LSR Group re-elected Molchanov as CEO for the next three years.

In 2019, he won the «Residential Construction» nomination in the rating of the best top managers according to the publication of «Delovoy Peterburg».

== Politics ==
In the spring of 1994, 22-year-old Molchanov ran for the legislative assembly of St. Petersburg, representing the «Choice of Russia» political movement founded by Yegor Timurovich Gaidar. The first round of elections was held using a majoritarian system, with 50 deputies being elected by districts. Molchanov made it to the second round, where he lost to Alexander Prokhorenko.

In 2007 Molchanov was appointed the Assistant of the Russian Federation public health services and social development Minister.

Andrey Molchanov was a member of the Federation Council representing Valeriy Serdyukov, the Governor of Leningrad Oblast (elected in January 2008), and the Chairman of the Council of Federation Committee on the Commonwealth of Independent States Issues (elected in December 2009). Representing Leningrad Oblast, he was on the Council of the Federation of the Federal Assembly for the Russian Federation from 2008 until 2013.

== Philanthropy ==
In 2022, he allocated $2.5 million for the restoration of the house of architect Konstantin Melnikov in Krivo-Arbatsky Lane. He is the laureate of the 25th Golden Pelican Award in the nomination «For the revival of traditions of patronage and support for the arts».

He funds the education of musically gifted children in the Leningrad Region.

== Income and property ==
Molchanov owns a $120 million yacht called Aurora. He also has Cypriot citizenship.

In January 2018, Molchanov was placed on the United States Department of Treasury «Oligarchs List» of persons who are close to Vladimir Putin. The list, which the US administration had been required by law to release, includes 114 senior political figures and 96 oligarchs, all of whom rose to prominence under Russian President Vladimir Putin.

== Family ==
Molchanov is married and has six children. Molchanov wife’s name is Elizaveta Molchanova. She is involved in charity work and is the initiator of the «Dobrotorium» Foundation.

His stepfather, Yuriy Molchanov, was a vice rector for international relations at Leningrad State University (LSU). He was the Deputy Governor of Saint Petersburg between 2004 and 2012.
