= Sibirtelecom =

Telecom and ISP company in Serbia

OJSC Sibirtelecom Сибирьтелеком
- Type: Joint stock
- Industry: Telecommunications
- Founded: 2002
- Defunct: April 1, 2011
- Headquarters: Novosibirsk, Russia
- Key people: Yevgeny Valeryevich Yurchenko, (Chairman); Anatoly I.Nikulin, (CEO), Ivan V. Dadykin, (CEO)
- Products: Telecommunciations services Internet services
- Revenue: ▲US$ 1.2 Billion (2008)
- Website: www.sibirtelecom.ru

Sibirtelecom (Russian: ОАО «Сибирьтелеком») is a former company, subsidiary of Svyazinvest Holding Company, is a regional telecommunications and Internet service provider in Siberia. It was responsible for providing service to over 29% of Russia's territory.

== History ==
The company was formed in 2002 by merging a number of regional and local companies:

- Altaitelecom, Barnaul,
- Gorno-Altaitelecom, Gorno-Altaysk
- Elektrosvayz of Irkutsk Oblast
- Elektrosvyaz of Kemerovo Oblast
- Elektrosvyaz of Krasnoyarsk Krai
- Elektrosvyaz of Novosibirsk
- Elektrosvyaz of Omsk Oblast
- Elektrosvyaz of Aga Buryatia
- Tomsktelecom
- Khakass subsidiary
- Chitatelekom
- Yeniseytelekom
- Baikalwestkom
- Rinet (operator of Sibnet.ru - content portal for Sibirtelecom Internet access users)
