= Uralsvyazinform =

Russian company

OJSC Uralsviazinform
- Native name: ОАО «Уралсвязьинформ»
- Company type: Joint stock
- Industry: Telecommunications
- Founded: 1992
- Defunct: April 1, 2011
- Fate: Merged with Rostelecom
- Successor: Rostelecom
- Headquarters: Ekaterinburg, Russia
- Key people: Sergey Lukash, (Chairman)
- Products: Telephony; Internet services Cable television services IPTV
- Revenue: ▲US$ 1.3 Billion (2008)
- Number of employees: 26,402
- Parent: Svyazinvest
- Website: u-tel.com

Uralsvyazinform (Russian: ОАО «Уралсвязьинформ») was a Russian telecommunications company, one of the former 7 regional telecommunications operators, formed and owned by the company Svyazinvest. The company served the Urals Federal District and the Perm Krai. Uralsvyazinform's stock was traded on the RTS and MICEX stock exchanges. Utel ("U-Tel") was the main brand under which the services were provided.

== History ==
In 2002, the Perm Krai communications operator, Uralsvyazinform merged with the following entities:

- Uraltelecom of the Sverdlovsk Oblast
- ETS of Yekaterinburg
- Svyazinform of Chelyabinsk Oblast
- Khanty-Mansiysk Telecom OJSC
- Tyumentelecom
- Yamalelectrosvyaz
- Elektrosvyaz of Kurgan Oblast
- Elektrosvyaz of Novosibirsk Oblast
- Novosibirsk City Telephone Network

JSC Uralsvyazinform was the largest operator of telecommunication services and a monopolist in the field of telephone communication in the Ural region. The company provided cellular network services, telephony, Internet using ADSL/ADSL2/ADSL2+ technology.

Following the liquidation of Svyazinvest, Uralsvyazinform became part of Rostelecom on April 1, 2011, together with the seven other Svyazinvest regional companies.

== Performance indicators ==
The number of fixed—line subscribers as of June 30, 2009 was 3.7 million, GSM cellular communications — 5.7 million, broadband Internet access — 633.3 thousand.

According to Advanced Communications & Media, as of December 2009, the number of BROADBAND subscribers was 670 thousand (share in the Russian market — 6%, 7th place).

The company's revenue (IFRS) in 2008 was 40.691 billion rubles (an increase of 3.9%, in 2007 — 39.152 billion rubles), net profit — 2.535 billion rubles (an increase of 10.4%, 2.297 billion rubles).
