= VolgaTelecom =

Russian telecommunications company

VolgaTelecom OJSC
- Company type: Open Joint Stock Company
- Industry: Telecommunications
- Founded: 2002; 23 years ago
- Defunct: 2011
- Fate: Merged with Rostelecom
- Successor: Rostelecom
- Headquarters: Nizhny Novgorod, Russia
- Area served: Volga Federal District
- Key people: Vladimir Rybakin, (CEO and Chairman)
- Products: Telecommunications services Internet services Cable television
- Revenue: (27,07 billion rubles (Fiscal Year Ended December 31, 2009))
- Net income: (4,26 billion rubles (Fiscal Year Ended December 31, 2009))
- Number of employees: 50,000
- Parent: Svyaz'invest Company
- Website: www.vt.ru

VolgaTelecom was a Russian telecommunications company formed in 2002 as a result of a reorganization of the Svyaz'invest Company in Moscow which consolidated 72 regional service providers into seven large interregional companies.

Headquartered in Nizhny Novgorod, the company was one of the largest operators, providing mobile and internet communications in the Volga Federal District. As of the end of 2006, it provided services to 5.123 million users. In 2011, the company was acquired by Rostelecom, Russia's largest domestic provider of digital services and was subsequently absorbed into the company.

== Operations ==
VolgaTelecom was formed on the basis of the merger of Nizhegorodsvyazinform (Russian: Нижегородсвязьинформ) with the following entities

- Kirovelektrosvyaz
- Elektrosvyaz of Orenburg Oblast
- Svyazinform of Penza Oblast
- Svyazinform of Samara Oblast
- Saratovelektrosvyaz
- Elektrosvyaz of Ulyanovsk Oblast
- Martelkom (Mari El)
- Svyazinform of the Republic of Mordovia
- Udmurttelecom Telecommunications Networks of Udmurtia
- Svyazinform of the Chuvash Republic
- Svyazinform of Samara Oblast
- Khantymansyskokrtelekom (Russian: Хантымансийскокртелеком)

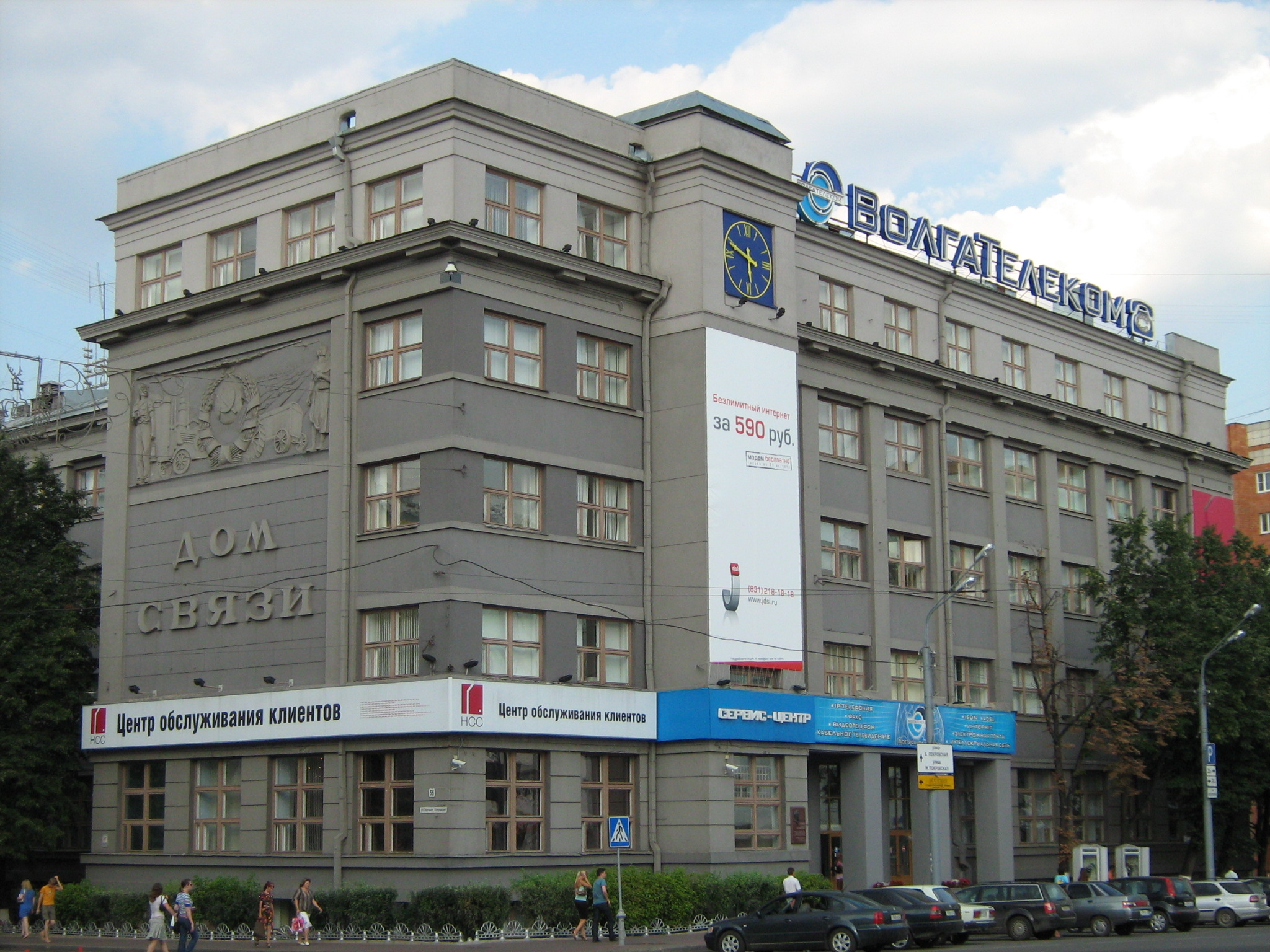
The VolgaTelecom headquarters in Nizhny Novgorod, 2007
