= Telecommunications in Russia =

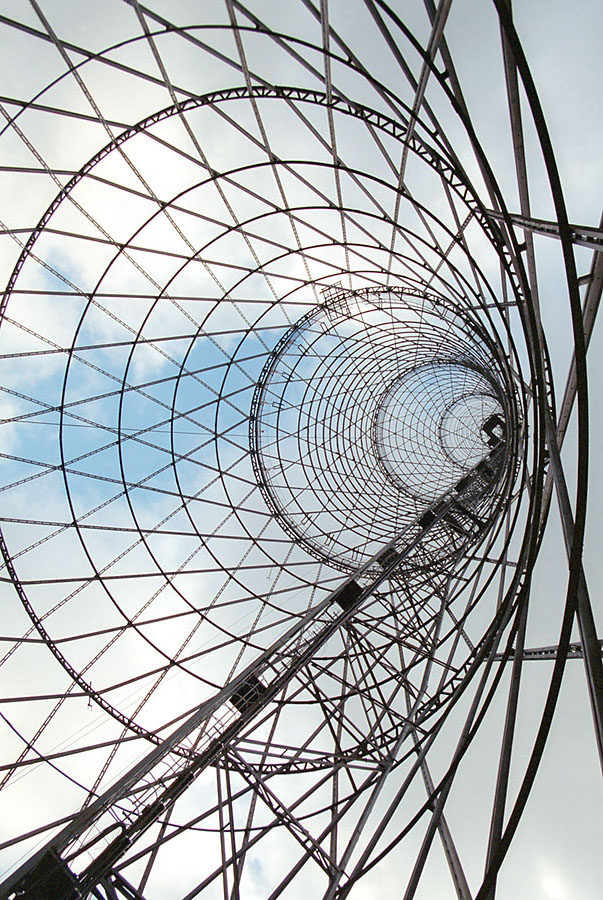
Shukhov Tower

Telecommunications in Russia is highly developed and have evolved from the early days of the telegraph to modern fibre broadband and high-speed 4G networks. Due to the enormous size of the country, the country leads in the number of TV broadcast stations and repeaters. The foundation for liberalization of broadcasting was laid by the decree signed by the President of the USSR in 1990. Currently, telecommunication is mainly regulated through the Federal Law "On Communications" and the Federal Law "On Mass Media"

Telecommunications in Russia has undergone significant changes since the 1980s, radio was a major new technology in the 1920s. Soviet authorities realized that the amateur radio was highly individualistic and encouraged private initiative. Criminal penalties were imposed but the working solution was to avoid broadcasting over the air. Instead radio programs were transmitted by copper wire, using a hub and spoke system, to loudspeakers in approved listening stations, such as the "Red" corner of a factory. This resulted in thousands of companies licensed to offer communication services today. There were few channels in the Soviet time, but in the past two decades many new state-run and private-owned radio stations and TV channels appeared. The Soviet-time "Ministry of communications of the RSFSR" was through 1990s transformed to "Ministry for communications and informatization" and in 2004 it was renamed to "Ministry of information technologies and communications (Mininformsvyazi)", and since 2008 Ministry of Communications and Mass Media.

Censorship and the issue of media freedom in Russia have been main themes since the era of the telegraph. Russia is served by an extensive system of automatic telephone exchanges connected by modern networks of fiber-optic cable, coaxial cable, microwave radio relay, and a domestic satellite system; cellular telephone service is widely available, expanding rapidly, and includes roaming service to foreign countries. Fiber to the x infrastructure has been expanded rapidly in recent years, principally by regional players including Southern Telecom Company, SibirTelecom, ER Telecom and Golden Telecom. Collectively, these players are having a significant impact of fiber broadband in regional areas, and are enabling operators to take advantage of consumer demand for faster access and bundled services. National security considerations have also imposed temporary restrictions on the telecommunications industry. International travelers may even be unable to access roaming data services for an entire 24 hours. Long-distance communication is restricted to specific locations.

== Early history ==
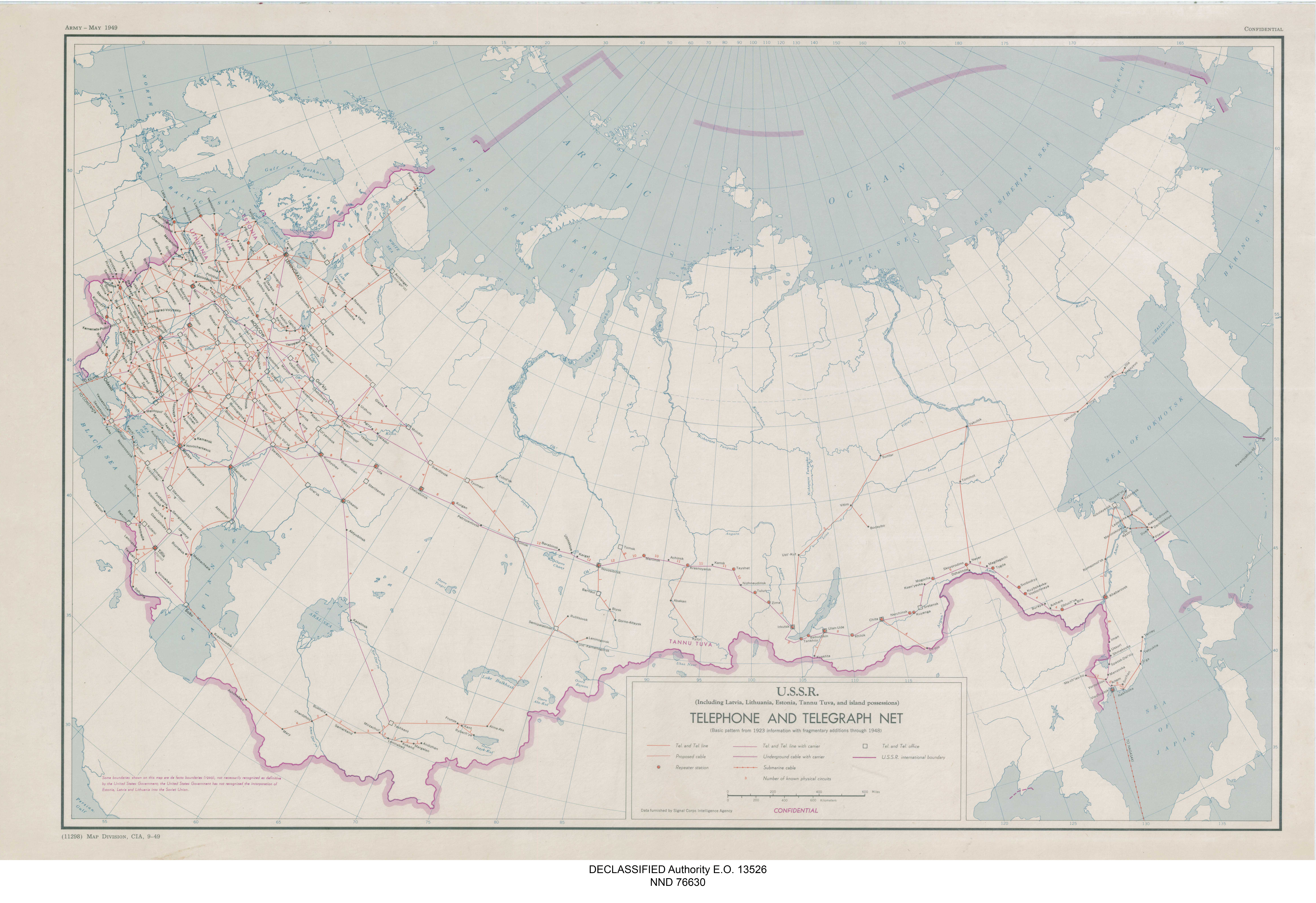
Telecommunication network of the Soviet Union (Data between 1923 - 1948)

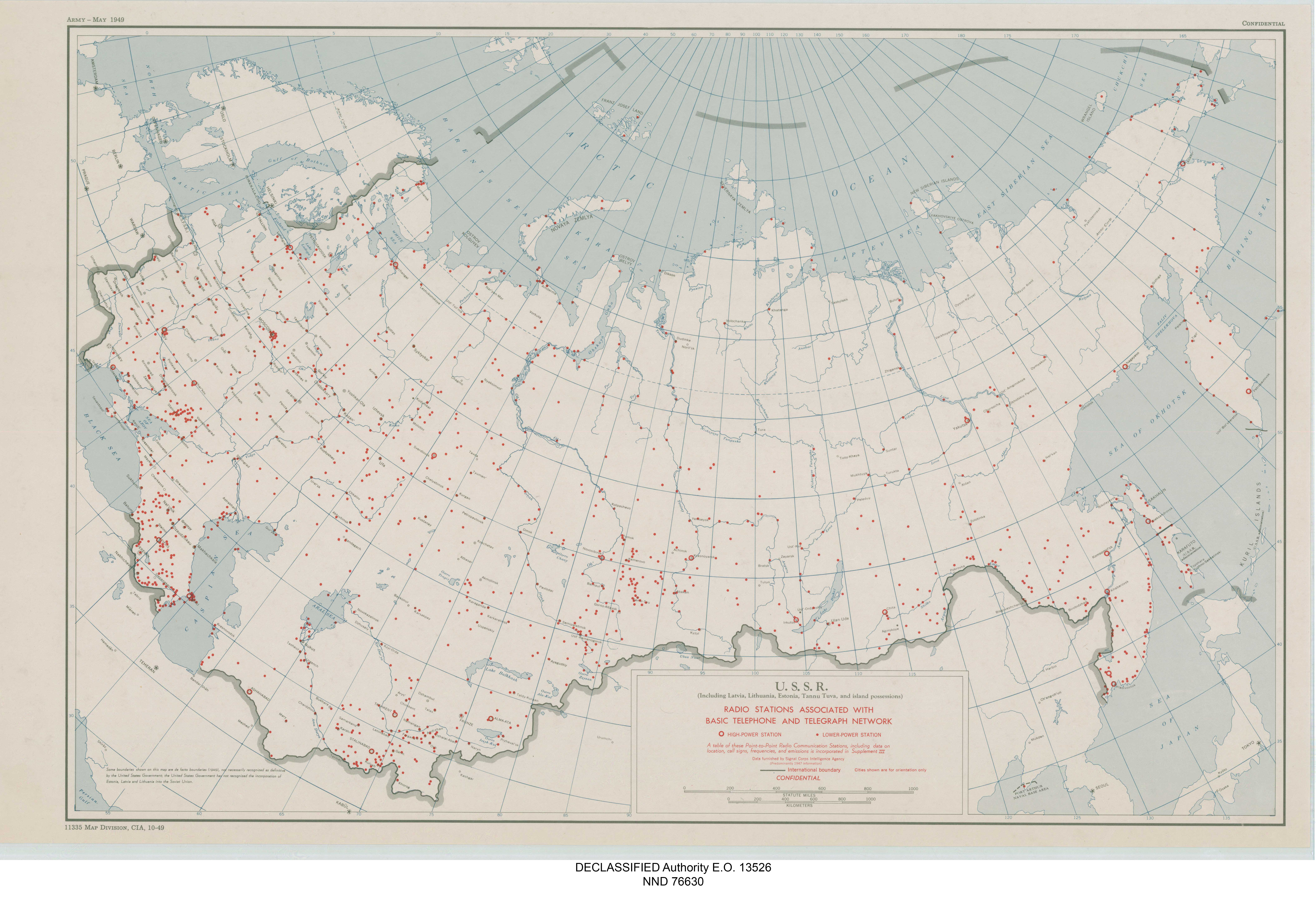
Radio stations in the Soviet Union, 1947

"Networking" can be traced to the spread of mail and journalism in Russia, and information transfer by technical means came to Russia with the telegraph and radio, besides, a 1837 sci-fi novel Year 4338, by the 19th-century Russian philosopher Vladimir Odoevsky, contains predictions such as "friends' houses are connected by means of magnetic telegraphs that allow people who live far from each other to talk to each other" and "household journals" "having replaced regular correspondence" with "information about the hosts’ good or bad health, family news, various thoughts and comments, small inventions, as well as invitations".

Computing systems became known in the USSR by the 1950s. Starting from 1952, works were held in the Moscow-based Institute of Precision Mechanics and Computer Engineering (headed by Sergei Lebedev) on automated missile defense system which used a "computer network" which calculated radar data on test missiles through central machine called M-40 and was interchanging information with smaller remote terminals about 100—200 kilometers distant. The scientists used several locations in the USSR for their works, the largest was a massive test range to the West from Lake Balkhash. In the meantime amateur radio users all over USSR were conducting "P2P" connections with their comrades worldwide using data codes. Later, a massive "automated data network" called Express was launched in 1972 to serve needs of Russian Railways.

In 1975, the IT and telecommunications exhibition SVIAZ was launched and has since grown to become the largest such gathering in Eastern Europe and Russia. It is part of the Russian Week of High Technologies and is held yearly in Moscow in the month of April. From the early 1980s the All Union Scientific Research Institute for Applied Computerized Systems (VNIIPAS) was working to implement data connections over the X.25 telephone protocol. A test Soviet connection to Austria in 1982 existed, in 1982 and 1983 there were series of "world computer conferences" at VNIIPAS initiated by the U. N. where USSR was represented by a team of scientists from many Soviet Republics headed by biochemist Anatole Klyosov; the other participating countries were UK, USA, Canada, Sweden, FRG, GDR, Italy, Finland, Philippines, Guatemala, Japan, Thailand, Luxembourg, Denmark, Brazil and New Zealand.

Also, in 1983 the San Francisco Moscow Teleport (SFMT) project was started by VNIIPAS and an American team which included George Soros. It resulted in the creation in the latter 80s of the data transfer operator SovAm (Soviet-American) Teleport. Meanwhile, on 1 April 1984, a Fool's Day hoax about "Kremlin computer" Kremvax was made in English-speaking Usenet. There are reports of spontaneous Internet (UUCP and USSR and telnet) connections "from home" through X.25 in the USSR in as early as 1988. In 1990, Skylink GlasNet non-profit initiative by the US-based Association for Progressive Communications sponsored Internet usage in several educational projects in the USSR (through Sovam).

=== 1998 financial crisis ===
When the Russian economy's collapse came about in August 1998, the market shrank drastically, where cellular operators MTS GSM, Beeline, North West GSM and Skylink were squeezed between low traffic and huge foreign currency denominated credits and telecommunications equipment bills. In 1998, MTS GSM, Beeline, North West GSM and Skylink prepaid subscriptions were made at a loss and infrastructure investments fell. NMT450 operator Moscow Cellular communications was hardest hit due to its about 50% corporate users. The 1998 crisis also caused many regional operators tariff and payment problems with accumulated debt to vendors; large debts were restructured and foreign investors lost out.

=== 2000s ===
In November 2013 President Putin instructed Dmitry Medvedev's Cabinet to provide "modern communication services" to rural settlements throughout Russia with a population of 250 to 500 people, by Rostelecom at the expense of the provision of universal service. The document does not specify what is meant by "modern communication services", but sources close to the Ministry of Communications and the state operator explain its intention of connecting villages to the wired internet. The budget comes among others, from the Universal Service Fund.

== Regulation ==
The Ministry of Communications and Mass Media is responsible for establishing and enforcing state policy in the sphere of electronic and postal communications, for promulgating the development and introduction of new information and communication technologies, and for coordinating the work of other state agencies in this area. Legislative oversight is exercised mainly through the State Duma Committee for mass media. The Committee develops mass media-related draft laws, and provides expert analysis of laws submitted by other Duma committees regarding their compliance with current media law.

=== Universal Service Fund ===
Universal Service Fund is a fund to finance socially important projects, for example, providing payphones in remote settlements. It consists of the contributions of all Russian operators of 1.2% of revenue. These funds are the Federal Communications Agency (Rossvyaz) distributes between 21 universal operator. These operators money comes to the budget, and Rossvâz receives from the budget for compensation and still these amounts roughly coincided, employee profile departments. But universal operators recently complained that they themselves lack the money to compensate for losses in the implementation of social projects.

In February 2014, Russian President Vladimir Putin signed amendments to the federal law "On Communications", which set Rostelecom a single operator of universal communication services. The company must commit itself to support the existing infrastructure of Universal Service, including payphones and access points (VRM) on the Internet. In addition to these duties, a single operator will also fight the digital divide by providing broadband at speeds of at least 10 Mbit / s settlements up to 250 people.

== Landline telephony ==
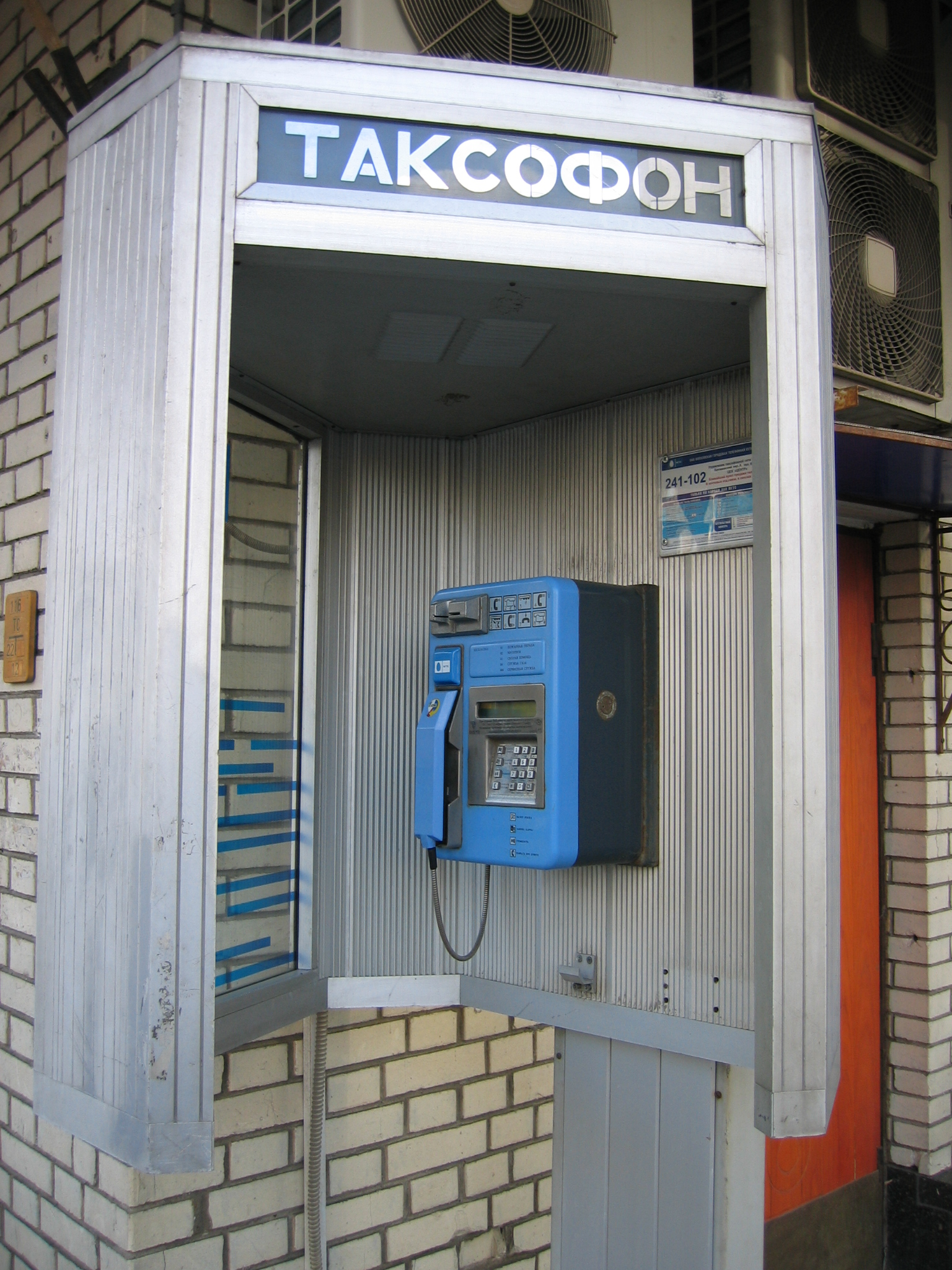
Telephone booth of Moscow City Telephone Network in 2007

Telephones – main lines in use: 32.277 million (2016)

Telephones – mobile cellular: 229.126 million (2016)

The telephone system employs an extensive system of modern network elements such as digital telephone exchanges, mobile switching centres, media gateways and signalling gateways at the core, interconnected by a wide variety of transmission systems using fibre-optics or Microwave radio relay networks. The access network, which connects the subscriber to the core, is highly diversified with different copper-pair, optic-fibre and wireless technologies.; cellular services, both analog and digital, are available in many areas. In the rural areas, the telephone services are still outdated, inadequate, and low density.

The Tsarist government of Russia issued its first decree on the development of urban telephone networks in 1881 and the first telephone exchanges in the Empire opened the following year. Initially, telephone exchanges were granted to private developers as concessions in the major cities, but in 1884 the government began to construct the first of its own exchanges and subsequently suspended the award of new concessions. Intercity telephone communications grew very slowly, with only a dozen lines in place by the start of the 20th century, most serving Moscow-Saint Petersburg traffic. After 1900, when the initial concessions had expired, the government eased control over private concessionaires and a burst of new construction took place. Included in the expansion during this period was the slow growth of exchanges built and operated by rural Zemstva, which were treated essentially as private concessionaires by the Imperial government.

Telephones played a significant role during the upheavals of 1917. In February, according to the last tsarist Chief of Police, 'neither the military authorities nor the mutineers thought of occupying the Telephone Exchange'; consequently it continued to function, serving both sides, until the operators finally left their positions amidst the growing confusion. In early July, however, the Provisional Government, fearing a Bolshevik coup, reportedly ordered the central telephone exchange to boycott calls requested by Bolsheviks (automatic switching systems had not yet been introduced).

In 1918, when the Soviet government moved to Moscow and war conditions were producing extreme shortages, Sovnarkom ordered a reduction of 50% in the volume of telephone communications in the new capital, to ensure that official needs of the new government would be served. The primary consequence of this decree for individuals was the 'communalisation' of telephones in private houses and flats. According to the decree, restrictions were focused on the 'parasitic stratum' of society, in the interest of the 'working population'. With the exception of personal phones belonging to high government officials, doctors and midwives, telephones in private flats were placed at the disposal of 'house committees', to be made available for 'general use' free of charge. Houses without telephones were entitled to free use of the communal phone of a neighbouring house; the decree further ordered the immediate installation of at least 150 telephones in public squares, particularly in outlying regions.

One year later Sovnarkom nationalized all telephone systems in the Russian Republic-including all intercity, urban, concessionary and zemstvo exchangesand assigned their administration and operation to the People's Commissariat for Posts and Telegraphs of the RSFSR. Beginning with the nationalization of telephones in 1919, Soviet policy exhibited two main characteristics: telephones increasingly became instruments for the bureaucracy and bureaucrats, and telephones in general were accorded a low investment priority. In March 1920, for instance, government institutions were exempted from the telephone tariff, receiving the right to use the telephone without payment, albeit for sharply restricted periods.

Until the end of 1991 (the end of the USSR), the sole fixed-line telephone operator in the country was the Ministry of Communications of the USSR. The state possessed all telecommunications structure and access networks. In 1994, the investment communication company (OJSC “Sviazinvest”) was established by the Presidential Decree No.1989 dated 10 October 1994 “On the specific features of the state management of the electric communication network for public use in Russian Federation”. The authorised capital of OJSC “Sviazinvest” was formed by the consolidation of federal shares of joint stock companies acting in the area of electric communications and established during the privatisation of the state enterprises for electric communications. The seven regional incumbents which make up Svyazinvest, majority-owned by the government, in early 2011 merged with the key subsidiary Rostelecom. The move created an integrated company based on Rostelecom which will be better placed to exploit economies of scale in coming years.

Cross-country digital trunk lines run from Saint Petersburg to Vladivostok, and from Moscow to Novorossiysk.

Liberalization of the long-distance communication market is another market driver. In January 2006, Russia passed a new law in relation to long-distance telecommunications, which partially broke up the monopolization that Rostelecom had been enjoying in the toll market. The law now allows other carriers to operate toll services. Currently, there are about 32 active companies in this space, including Interregional TransitTelekom (MTT), Golden Telecom, TransTelekom and Synterra Media. share of fixed-line business of Rostelecom's main competitors varied in 2012 from 6% (Megafon) to 19% (MTS). Still, At the beginning of the 2010s, Rostelecom is de facto a monopoly local telephony provider to households in Russia, except for few regions, where incumbents were not part of Svyazinvest holding after the privatization in the early 1990s (the cities of Moscow, Pskov, Kostroma, the republics of Tatarstan, Bashkortostan, as well as Tuva, Chukotka, Chechnya, and Ingushetia).

The substitution of long-distance fixed-line voice services by mobile and IP traffic sped up after 2008, when mobile operators shifted to the fixed-line segment (PJSC Vimpelcom was the first company out of the Big 3 to acquire Golden Telecom in early 2008) and simultaneously increased investments into own trunk network infrastructure to support, rapid 3G traffic growth. In February 2014 Megafon, SkyLink, through its subsidiary NetByNet purchased Tele-MIG Besides a company founded in 2003 which provides fixed telephony, IP-telephony and data transmission in Yamalo-Nenets Autonomous Okrug.

Russian regulation stipulates that new players must build their own networks. The growth of traffic between Europe and Asia is an additional opportunity; more than 6,000 km of international communication cables were built during the first nine months of 2007, representing a 48.5% increase on 2006, according to the Russian Ministry of Communication and Mass Media.

year	1911	1937	1952	1873	1976	1979	1980	1981	1982	1983	1984	1985	1986	1987	1988	1989	1990	1991	1992	1993	1994	1995	1996	1997	1998	1999	2000	2002	2003	2004	2005	2006	2007	2008	2009	2010	2011	2012
Number of subscribers (in mill.)	11.1	21.2	98.3	45.8	54.7	35.8	89.7	32.3	67.6	65.7	65.9	23.4	45.7	28.7	21.5	25.9	25.4	24.2	23.2	23.4	23.3	23.1	23.5	23.6	23.8	23.9	23.7	35.5	36.1	38.5	40.1	43.9	45.2	45.5	45.4	44.9	44.2	43.1

=== Tariffs ===
Tariffs in the fixed-line segment are determined by the Federal Tariff Service on an annual basis, taking into consideration inflation and the operators' expenses. The price competition in the long-distance segment increased as mobile operators began implementing promotional tariffs to stimulate voice traffic growth after the crisis (long-distance traffic is predominantly built by corporate clients). At the same time, traditional operators had limited room for maneuver as intra-zonal and domestic LD tariffs, which are subject to regulation by the government, remained flat over the last three years. As a result, mobile operators managed to bite off a heavy share of intraregional and long-distance market from traditional fixed-line operators, first of all regional operators of Svyazinvest, which are now united under Rostelecom.

=== Public switched telephone network ===
Russian public switched telephone network (PSTN) has specific features. The lowest part of this model is example of the local network in the middle and large cities. The central office (CO) is connected to the tandem exchange (TE). In some cases, COs are connected by the directly. Such possibility is shown by the dotted lines for three COs connected to the TEIII. COs may be directly connected with the toll exchange. This option is shown by the dotted line for the COII1. Automatic Branch Exchange (PABX) is served by the nearest CO. All TEs are forming the meshed network. Up to the 1990s, TE was independent element of the local network. Operators did not use the equipment combined functions Tandem and Toll Exchanges. So, TE provided connections between COs of the local network, and access to the toll exchange. A function of the toll exchange is to establish connections for the long-distance and international calls. Last type of calls is served by the Gateway (GW). Processing of the local calls is performed by the COs and TEs. If a subscriber dials digit "8" (prefix of the long-distance connection in the national PSTN) all further processing of the call is a function of a toll exchange. The numbering plan for the cellular networks based on the Area Code (three digits) and number of mobile terminal (seven digits). In this case, the Area Code defines the concrete cellular network.

== Mobile phone ==
Mobile phone industry in Russia is a trade industry of cell phone devices and Mobile network operators in Russia. Since the collapse of the Soviet Union in the 1991 it had seen a great expansion over the last decades becoming one of the largest in the world. In terms of number of smartphone users, Russia is the 4th biggest smartphone market in the world as of 2019, sitting behind only China, India, and USA. As of 2025, there are four mobile phone service brands that cover all Russia: MTS, MegaFon, t2 and Beeline.

The country's telecom regulator is Roskomnadzor (RKN). There are four nationwide mobile phone service providers who possess 2G, 3G and 4G licenses in every region of Russia (so called Big-4), with additional regional operators. The mobile phone service provider licensing in Russia is under the control of Rospechat, the Federal Agency on Press and Mass Communications of Russia.

For new technologies, Russia's mobile phone industry has depended on overseas companies. For example, in 2009, MegaFon revealed that Nokia Siemens Networks (NSN) was selected as the winner of its tender to building 3G network and that the following companies together would collaborate on MegaFon's 3G deployment and upgrades until 2010: Nokia Siemens Networks (NSN), Huawei Technologies, Alcatel-Lucent, Ericsson and ZTE. The Russian mobile phone service operators have been active in their presence in the CIS and other foreign countries. As of 2025, Beeline is already in Kazakhstan, Kyrgyzstan and Uzbekistan. MegaFon is in Tajikistan, and MTS is in Belarus.

=== Mobile phone service providers ===
No.	Operator	Coverage across 89 federal subjects (as of Mar 2025)	Technology (as of Mar 2025)	Subscribers (in millions)	Ownership	Established	Mobile country code
Big four mobile network operators
1	MTS	countrywide (83 federal subjects) (except Crimea, Sevastopol, Luhansk, Donetsk, Zaporozhye, Kherson)	GSM-900/1800 MHz (GPRS, EDGE); 900/2100 MHz UMTS, HSDPA, HSUPA, HSPA+ 800/900/1800/2100/2600 MHz LTE, VoLTE; 800/900/1800 MHz NB-IoT, 2100/2600/4900 MHz 5G NR	83.4 (Q4 2025)	PJSC Sistema (42.09%), PJSC MTS (1.93%), free float (50.03%)	1993	25001
2	MegaFon	countrywide (83 federal subjects) (except Crimea, Sevastopol, Luhansk, Donetsk, Zaporozhye, Kherson)	GSM-900/1800 MHz (GPRS, EDGE); 900/2100 MHz UMTS, HSDPA, HSUPA, HSPA+ 800/1800/2500/2600 MHz LTE, LTE-A, VoLTE; 1800/2100/2600 MHz 5G NR	79.37 (Q4 2025)	OOO USM Holdings (50%), OOO AF Telecom Holdings (50%)	1993	25002
3	t2	70 federal subjects	GSM-900/1800 MHz (GPRS, EDGE); 2100 MHz UMTS, HSDPA, HSUPA, HSPA+ 450/800/900/1800/2100/2300/2600 MHz LTE, 4900 MHz 5G NR	48.9 (Q4 2025)	PJSC Rostelecom	2003	25020
4	Beeline	83 federal subjects	GSM-900/1800 MHz (GPRS, EDGE); 900/2100 MHz UMTS, HSDPA, HSUPA, HSPA+ 800/1800/2100/2600 MHz LTE, LTE-A, VoLTE	44.1 (Q3 2023)	PJSC VimpelCom	1993	25099
Regional mobile network operators
5	K-Telecom	Crimea, Sevastopol, Luhansk, Donetsk, Zaporozhye, Kherson	GSM-900/1800 MHz; 2100 MHz UMTS; 2600 MHz LTE	3.0 (2025)	OOO K-Telecom	2014	25032, 25096
6	MOTIV	Sverdlovsk, Kurgan, Khanty-Mansi, Yamalo-Nenets	GSM-1800 MHz; 1800/2500 MHz LTE, VoLTE	2.5 (2025)	OOO EKATERINBURG-2000	1996	25035
7	Miranda	Crimea, Sevastopol, Luhansk, Donetsk, Zaporozhye, Kherson	GSM-900 MHz; 2100 MHz UMTS; 450 MHz LTE	2.1 (2025)	OOO Miranda-Media	2014	25054
8	Letai	Tatarstan	GSM-1800 MHz; 1800 MHz LTE	2.0 (2025)	PJSC Tattelecom	1998	25027
9	Phoenix	Donetsk	GSM-900/1800 MHz; 2100 MHz UMTS; 800/900/1800/2600 MHz LTE	1.5 (2023)	SUE DPR "ROS"	2015	25097
10	MKS	Luhansk	GSM-900/1800 MHz; 2100 MHz UMTS; 900/1800/2600 MHz LTE	1.0 (2022)	OOO MKS	2015	25098
11	Vainah Telecom	Chechnya	GSM-900/1800 MHz; 2300 MHz LTE	0.1 (2020)	JSC Vainah Telecom	2009	25008

In 1963, USSR's first mobile phone network using the car phone came into operation. Initial selection of technological mobile standard in Russia had been left for market forces by issuing licenses for different standards. Later, regulatory authorities have developed stricter policy. However, there still exists a great variety of both analogue and digital standards. NMT standard was a first generation analogue mobile technology that still has footstep in Russia, employed by commercial mobile operators since the early 90s. Regional operators have deployed the GSM networks in Russia since 1995, originally in the 900 MHz frequency band. GSM standard is dominating in Russian mobile market with small number of NMT-450, AMPS/DAMPS subscribers.

In 1994, a joint venture of Moscow City Telephone Network, T-Mobile and Siemens, which later became part of Mobile TeleSystems, offered Russia's first mobile phone service for the public in Moscow. In the same year in June, VimpelCom also started Beeline mobile phone service.

In 2002, MegaFon was formed to provide all-Russia service, amalgamating Sonic Duo of Moscow, Mobikom-Novosibirsk, and other companies. In that year also, the number of mobile subscribers in Russia soared by 130% to 18mn, implying penetration of 12.3%, compared with 5.4% at the end of the previous year. The continued strong growth of the cellular subscriber base was largely due to the accelerating regional rollout of the major national cellular operators. In 2007, MegaFon started Russia's first 3G service in Saint Petersburg. In May 2008, 3G network M7 was deployed in St. Petersburg, in Kazan in June of that year, and in Sochi in July of that year. By 2010, 3G networks covered largely most of Russia.

Russian WiMAX operator Scartel (Yota brand), finished in 2010 its implementation of a trial LTE network in Kazan and plans to deploy LTE networks in Novosibirsk and Samara. In July 2010 Scartel received approval from regulator Roskomnadzor to abandon WiMAX for LTE, re-using its existing spectrum. the regulator had however previously insisted that the frequencies allocated to Scartel for WiMAX could not be used for other access types.

In April 2011, MegaFon deployed high-definition voice services on its Moscow and Sochi GSM and UMTS networks. As the key supplier of core and access networks to MegaFon, Nokia Siemens Networks was responsible for the HD voice implementation, which is also a world first for a commercial GSM network.

In early 2011, Rostelecom signed a memorandum of understanding with the three main MNOs to develop a joint LTE network using the infrastructure to be built by Yota. The network will expand LTE availability to 70 million Russians in 180 cities by 2014, vastly improving regional broadband availability in coming years. In December 2011, Rostelecom signed an agreement with Yota, a Russian mobile broadband provider, to jointly develop and use 4G wireless networks. The agreement facilitated the development and expansion of advanced communications technologies in the country, including the latest 4G-LTE system. Both companies will make full use of each other's telecommunications infrastructures and advanced telecommunications services will be made more accessible to Russian residents. As part of the agreement, Rostelecom have the right to use Yota's wireless networks and to provide customers with telecommunications services as a MVNO. The agreement will also provide Rostelecom with access to Yota's existing telecommunications equipment sites and its wire communications channels at these sites. In return, Yota will use Rostelecom's wire communications channels at their telecommunication equipment sites; it will gain access to Rostelecom's Internet connection and inter-city backbone links and the company's existing telecommunication equipment sites and data centres.

In September 2012, MTS launched the country's first TD-LTE network, using the TD-LTE spectrum in the 2595-2620 MHz band it secured in February. In May 2013, there were over one million LTE subscribers in Russia.

The 2012 tender of the Ministry of Communications awarded licenses to deploy LTE networks in the lower (720–790 MHz, 791–862 MHz) and upper (2500–2690 MHz) bands to the "big 3" (Megafon, MTS and Veon) and to the national fixed-line operator Rostelecom. Each of the winners relies on two lanes wide in the upper range of 10 MHz and 7.5 MHz in the lower. The upper range of frequencies considered to be free and is suitable for deploying LTE. However, the lower, mostly occupied by the security forces and navigation and radar systems. On September of that year MTS launched the country's first TD-LTE network, using the TD-LTE spectrum in the 2595–2620 MHz band it secured in February. Nokia Siemens had provided its Single Radio Access Network using energy-efficient Flexi Multiradio Base Stations as well as its Liquid Core-based Evolved Packet Core platform.

In November 2013 Megafon began to provide the LTE network in the Republic of Kalmykia, the Yamal-Nenets Autonomous Okrug, and the Altai Krai. The network was launched in major cities in the regions Elista, Noyabrsk, Novy Urengoy and Gorno-Altaisk. On the same month Mobile phone retailer Svyaznoi started selling SIM cards under the Svyaznoi Mobile brand in November, becoming a new mobile virtual network operator (MVNO), using MTS infrastructure. Interregional TransitTelekom said a month later that it also plans to launch an MVNO in April 2014 targeting migrant workers, offering low cost calls to Central Asian countries.

In December 2013, Minister of Communications, Nikolay Nikiforov recalled that in 2011 270 base stations of LTE were launched, in 2012 about 4,000, in 2013 10,000 and it is planned that in 2014–2015 more than 15 thousand such stations. On the same month it was announced that the "biggest four", Rostelecom, MTS, Beeline and Megafon completed the construction of communication facilities in the areas of transport corridor "North – South" and "East – West", with a total length of more than 11 thousand km. Work was done to ensure that these routes support advanced cellular communication, and operators spent money under the federal program to improve road safety and implementation of the "Glonass Era". Objects were built on federal roads M5 Ural, M6 Caspian, M53, M55 Baikal and M60 Ussuri according to the press service of the Ministry of Communications of Russia. Costs for the construction of antenna towers were divided by the operators on an equal share, and the cost to provide power to the communication infrastructure undertaken by the state. At the end of this month Scartel (Yota brand) launched LTE network in the cities of Cheboksary, Irkutsk, Kirov, Omsk, Penza, and Ulyanovsk.

On December 4, 2013, the first Russian smartphone, Yotaphone was launched. The idea of YotaPhone was created in Russia, but manufacturing and assembly of the phone is done in China. YotaPhone is a smartphone with support for fourth generation networks, LTE. Feature of the device is the presence of a 4.3-inch screens on two sides: The LCD one is on the front, while the black and white screen with "electronic ink" is on the back side. The first device was awarded to Prime Minister of Russia Dmitry Medvedev by Rostec state corporation head, Sergei Chemezov.

At the end of 2013 there were about 239 million SIM cards in use in the country, which is equal to 168% of the population. The access points (AP) are built in long-distance telephone exchanges (LDTEs), Russian fixed-line communication infrastructure which is present in every province. As a result, interconnecting mobile operator only needs to create "last kilometer" circuits to the regional LDTE, the requirement already imposed by its mobile license. Rostelecom, the leading fixed-line operator in the country has regional subsidiaries who provide cellular services.

Rostelecom the largest fixed-line operator and former monopoly, together with its subsidiary T2 provide mobile services on the territory of 65 regions of Russia, serving more than 36.5 million subscribers. During the 2010s, Rostelecom and Tele2 built mobile networks of the third generation in 40 regions of Russia. Total planned to install more than 8 thousand base stations. Suppliers of equipment and solutions for the 3G+ network are Ericsson and Huawei.

=== Russian manufacturers ===
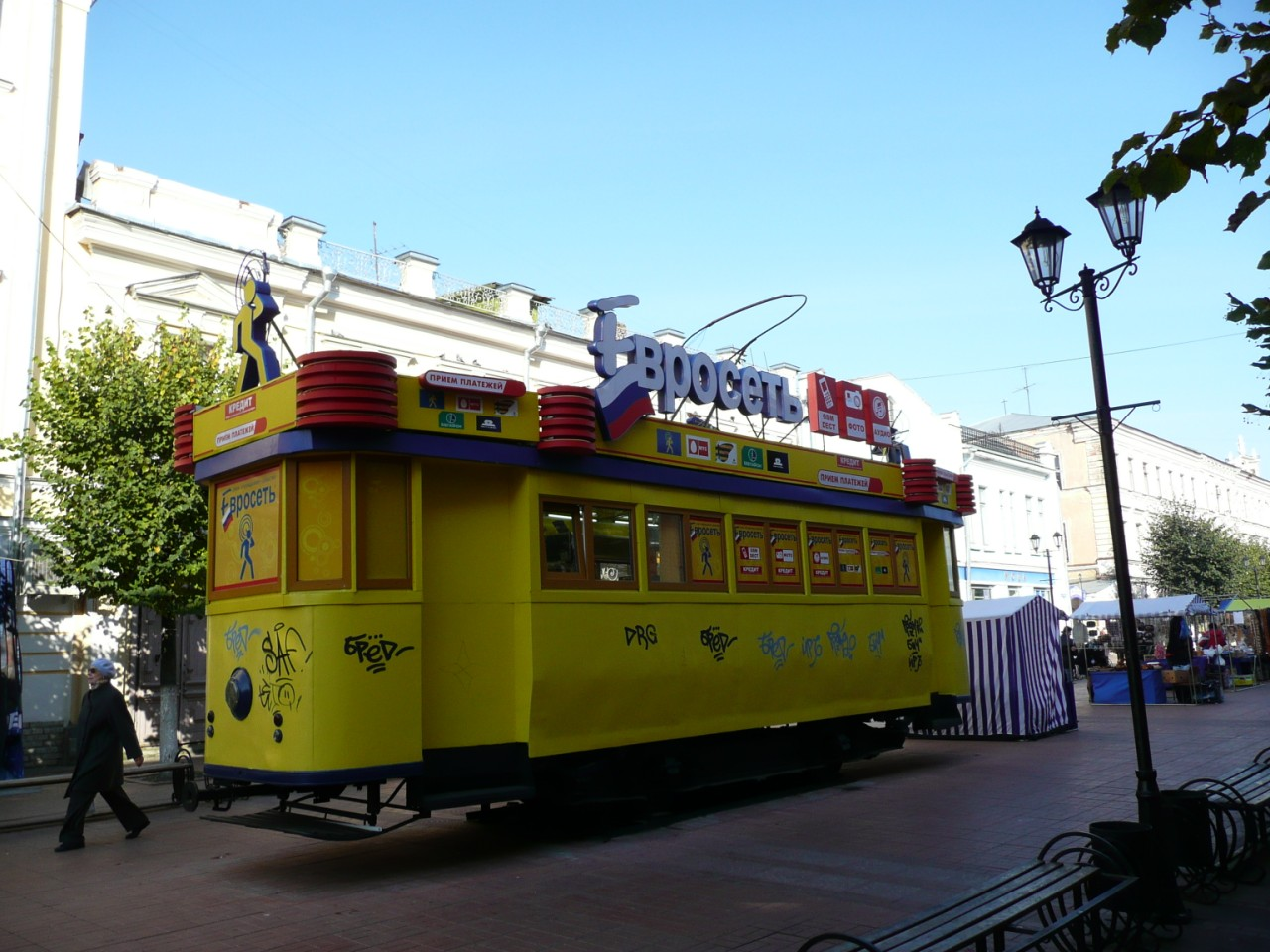
Euroset retail pavilion in Tver, Russia in 2008

- Beeline
- Explay (become subsidiary of Fly in 2015)
- Gresso
- Highscreen
- Megafon
- MTS
- RoverPC
- teXet
- Sitronics
- Yotaphone

=== Number portability ===
Mobile number portability officially became available in Russia on December 1, 2013. An appropriate legislation signed into law by President Vladimir Putin a year earlier, on December 26, 2012. Operators have repeatedly stated that the time allotted is not enough to run services. Within 12 days since the law came into force, 9090 subscribers filed applications to move to another operator, of which only 57 had been satisfied.

== Radio ==
Radio Rossii is the primary public radio station in Russia. Digital radio broadcasting is developing fast with the Voice of Russia announced on 1 July 2004, the successful implementation, and planned expansion, of its DRM broadcasts on short-wave and medium-wave. In September 2009, the Russian State Commission for Radio Frequencies, the national regulator of broadcasting, has decided on the DRM has the standard for mediumwave and shortwave services.

Radios: 61.5 million (1998)

Radio broadcasting stations: AM 420, FM 447, shortwave 56 (1998).

== Television ==
Privately owned stations are often owned by industrial groups either controlled by the State or with close connections to the government so that they can be called semi-state. Both state and private stations can have a national status (broadcasters that reach over 70% of the national territory), or a regional, district or local status. Local partners are often united in bigger networks.

In the 1970s and 1980s, television become the preeminent mass medium. In 1988 approximately 75 million households owned television sets, and an estimated 93 percent of the population watched television. Moscow, the base from which most of the television stations broadcast, transmitted some 90 percent of the country's programs, with the help of more than 350 stations and nearly 1,400 relay facilities.

There are about 15,000 TV transmitters. Development of domestic digital TV transmitters, led within "Multichannel" research program, had already been finished. New domestic digital transmitters have been developed and installed in Nizhniy Novgorod and Saint Petersburg in 2001–2002.

The state television broadcaster is Pervy kanal (Channel One)., VGTRK (channels: Rossiya 1, Rossiya 2, Rossiya K, Rossiya 24, Carousel (together with Channel One)), TV Tsentr (it is owned by the administration of the city of Moscow), Telekanal Zvezda (owner Ministry of Defence) and TV-Novosti (RT channel in English, Rusiya Al-Yaum channel in Arabic, RT America channel based in Washington, D.C., United States in English, RT Actualidad channel in Spanish, RT Documentary channel in Russian).

== Internet ==
Broadband internet access is becoming more readily available in Russia, and as a result the internet is growing as an avenue for Russian commerce, with 42% of internet users in Russia shopping online, and 38% using online banking services.

=== IPTV ===
The IPTV developing fast as a cheap alternative to regular television. In July 2011, Rostelecom started a plan to unify IPTV services in Russia's regions offering standard features such as linear and on-demand TV along with new interactive and OTT services provided by the operator to various mobile devices. For this Russian company SmartLabs was chosen.

Country code top-level domain: RU (Also SU – left from Soviet Union)

== International connection ==
Russia is connected internationally by three undersea fiber-optic cables; digital switches in several cities provide more than 50,000 lines for international calls; satellite earth stations provide access to Intelsat, Intersputnik, Eutelsat, Inmarsat, and Orbita. Rostelecom set up international fiber-optic communication lines providing access to Finland, Turkey, Italy, Bulgaria, Japan, China, Estonia, Latvia, Kazakhstan, Ukraine, Azerbaijan, Georgia, and Belarus. The company's international points of presence are in Stockholm, Frankfurt, Amsterdam, and London. Russia due to its connections to Europe and Asia offers high-speed transit services from Europe to Asia via the Russian territory. international digital transit telephone network of Rostelecom is based on ten international transit and communication centers and six combined communication centers. The total installed capacity of the zonal network by the end of 2011 constituted 1,100,600 channels. The level of international communication centers digitalization constituted 100%.

In May 2006, Rostelecom launched a new fiber-optic data transmission line linking Russia's Far Eastern cities of Belogorsk and Blagoveshchensk with the Chinese city of Heihe on the Chinese-Russian border. In May 2006 TransTeleCom Company and North Korea's Ministry of Communications have signed an agreement for the construction and joint operation of a fiber-optic transmission line (FOTL) in the section of the Khasan–Tumangang railway checkpoint. This is the first direct land link between Russia and North Korea. TTC's partner in the design, construction, and connection of the communication line from the Korean side to the junction was Korea Communication Company of North Korea's Ministry of Communications. The technology transfer was built around STM-1 level digital equipment with the possibility of further increasing bandwidth. The construction was completed in 2007.

In 2011, Rostelecom came to an agreement with Mongolian operator Mobicom aimed at establishing a Russia-Mongolia border-crossing transmission line and at providing telecommunications services. It also opened a new international Kaliningrad-Poland transmission line through the Poland–Russia border to optimize costs when providing services to end users and operators in Kaliningrad.

In February 2012, the national operator Rostelecom has selected TeliaSonera International Carrier to operate and manage its new backbone network between Kingisepp, Russia and Stockholm. The next-generation managed optical network provides connectivity between the cable landing points of the Baltic Cable System, Kingisepp and Kotka, implemented over TeliaSonera International Carrier's wholly owned fibre-optic infrastructure to Stockholm.

In September 2013, EPEG International Cable System, of which Russia is a member, became in commercial use. Main line connects Western Europe and the Middle East through Russia. The line, connecting Frankfurt across Eastern Europe, Russia, Azerbaijan, Iran and the Persian Gulf to the capital of the Oman, Muscat, has an initial capacity of 540 gigabits per second. The total length of the new cable system amounted to about 10,000 kilometers, and design capacity is up to 3.2 terabits per second. Vodafone organized a main line connecting Europe with Ukraine to the border with Russia. From the Russian-Ukrainian border to the border with Azerbaijan and through Azerbaijan to the borders with Iran the line was built by Rostelecom together with the Azerbaijani partner Delta Telecom.

In 2015, Transarctic Russian optical cable system (ROTAX) will be completed. The fiber optical cable a pass route from Bude (UK) through Murmansk, Anadyr and Vladivostok in Russia and finish at Tokyo. The total length of the cable system will be about 16,000 km with capacity of the system is 60 Tbit/s. The project was initiated ROTAX is JSC "Polarnet Project", and is being built by Tyco Electronic Subcom.

== Fiber optical infrastructure ==
In late 2012, Russia's leading telecom companies Rostelecom, MTS, PJSC Vimpelcom and Megafon signed memorandum to jointly build and operate submarine-laid fiber optic cable to connect between town of Okha on Sakhalin Island with the mainland towns of Magadan and Petropavlovsk-Kamchatsky. Capacity of the underwater cable will amount to 8 Tbit/s (80*100 Gbit/s) with the total length of lines around 2,000 km.

At the end of 2013, Rostelecom completed to deploy the Tynda - Yakutsk fiber line which according to the company provides network redundancy, optimizing traffic and increase trunk in areas Tynda - Skovorodino - Khabarovsk. The 1,056-km, 80 Gbit/s link is based on DWDM technology. Its capacity can be expanded to 3.2 Tbit/s in future. The new backbone increased the capacity of telecommunications links in Yakutsk, Aldan and Neryungri, as well as Nizhny-Bestyakh, Kachikatsy, Nizhny-Kuranakh, Bolshoy-Khatymi and Yengra.

== Emergency calls ==
In December 2010, then President Dmitry Medvedev signed a presidential decree enabling the implementation of a single number, 112, for emergency services in all the regions of Russia. Transition to the new emergency number will be gradual; it is envisaged that 112 will replace the previous emergency numbers 01, 02, 03 and 04 by 2017. In December 2012, Russian President Vladimir Putin signed a law establishing the single emergency service number 112 throughout the country. In a press conference in December 2013, Minister of Emergency Situations Vladimir Puchkov said that the unified system will be running in a full pilot mode from 2014 and will fully enter to operational mode in 2016.

== Statistics ==
Percentage (%) of enterprises using selected hardware and ICT services in Russia, 2004-2010

Year	2004	2005	2006	2007	2008	2009	2010
Personal computer (PC)	87.6	91.1	93.3	93.3	93.7	93.7	93.8
Local Area Network (LAN)	49.7	52.4	57.0	56.4	59.3	60.4	68.4
Internet access	48.8	53.3	61.3	73.7	73.7	78.3	82.4
Broadband access	-	-	-	31.0	39.2	47.3	56.7
Intranet	-	-	8.6	9.3	10.8	11.8	13.1
Website	14.3	14.8	21.1	19.8	22.8	24.1	28.5

Key data on the telecommunications and ICT market in Russia, 2004-2011

Year	2004	2005	2006	2007	2008	2009	2010	2011e
Telecommunications market value (€ bn)	12.9	16.0	20.9	25.0	27.5	24.4	28.5	30.6
Telecommunications market growth rate (%)	32.0	23.5	30.6	20.2	10.0	-11.4	17.1	7.3
ICT market value (€ bn)	19.8	25.0	31.6	39.1	42.3	34.0	41.3	46.4
ICT market growth rate (%)	-	26.3	26.4	23.7	8.2	-19.6	21.5	12.3

e - estimate

== See also ==
- Media of Russia
- Svyazinvest
- Transport in Russia
- Federal Agency on Press and Mass Communications of Russia
- List of mobile network operators of Europe#Russia
- Mobile phone industry in Ukraine
