= K-Telecom =

Russian telecommunications company

OOO K-Telecom
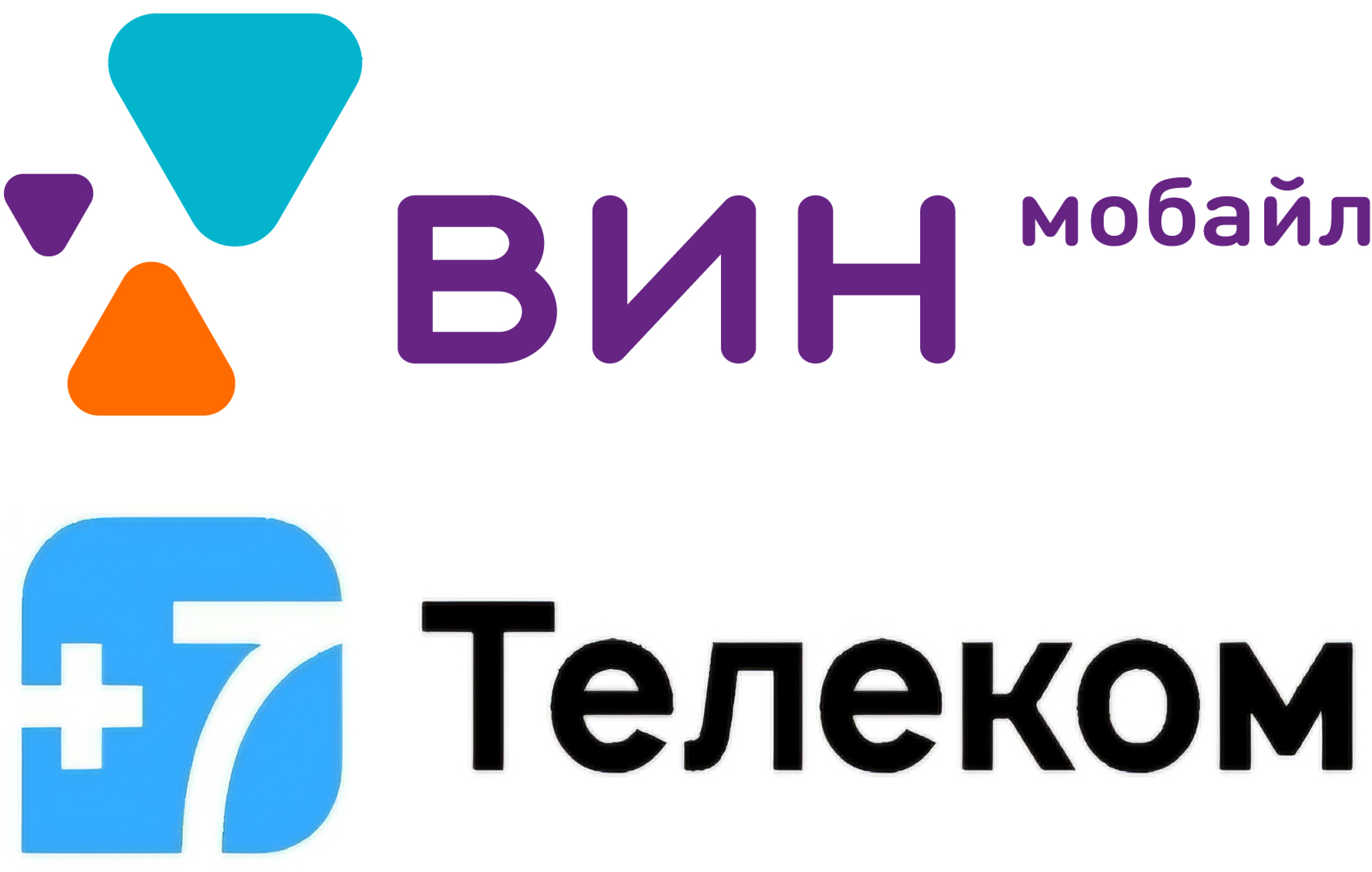
- Brand logos of K-Telecom - Win mobile and +7Telecom
- Native name: ООО «К-Телеком»
- Company type: Limited liability company
- Industry: Telecommunications
- Founded: 2014; 12 years ago
- Headquarters: Chekistov Avenue, 33, bldg. 2, Krasnodar, Russia
- Area served: Crimea, Sevastopol, Luhansk, Donetsk, Zaporozhye, Kherson
- Products: cellular network, local telephone service, broadband, mobile television
- Brands: Win mobile, +7Telecom
- Website: mobile-win.ru 7telecom.ru

K-Telecom (Russian: К-Телеком) is a Russian telecommunications company and mobile network operator. As of 2025, it operates under brand Win mobile (Вин мобайл) in Crimea and Sevastopol, and under brand +7Telecom (+7Телеком) in Luhansk, Donetsk, Zaporozhye and Kherson.

Big four Russian mobile network operators MTS, MegaFon, t2 and Beeline have long avoided the internationally recognized occupied territories to avoid direct sanctions, which led to creation of separate mobile network operators like K-Telecom and Miranda. By the end of 2023, K-Telecom had cancelled internal roaming charges while roaming on big four Russian mobile networks.

== History ==
Following the start of Russo-Ukrainian war, K-Telecom officially began operations as Win Mobile in Crimea and Sevastopol in August 2014 on the frequencies and equipment of the former operator MTS Ukraine, and is often believed that the company is owned by MTS due to the purchase by the former CEO of MGTS Pavel Kuznetsov. Between 2022 and 2023, following the 2022 annexation, K-Telecom started operations in Luhansk, Donetsk, Zaporozhye and Kherson under the brand +7Telecom.

In 2018, through an International Telecommunication Union publication, Ukraine requested telecommunication operators in their respective countries to refrain from routing in the telecommunication public networks of the outgoing and incoming international traffic, which can be received in the indices of numbers of the numbering plan of the Russian Federation, allocated for the use in the territory of Crimea, by telecommunications operators of the Russian Federation, and under the international mobile country identification code of land-based networks with radio access “250” (mobile country code) identification codes (mobile network code): 32; 33; 34; 60. Win mobile uses 25032, while +7Telecom uses 25096. On 25 February 2022, Vodafone Ukraine cancelled roaming with Russian operators MTS and MegaFon in Luhansk People's Republic and Donetsk People's Republic, which lead to no mobile service in the republics.

By June 2022, +7Telecom had taken over Vodafone Ukraine's infrastructure and started operations in Luhansk, Donetsk, Zaporozhye and Kherson. By January 2024, +7Telecom had restored internet access in Donetsk and Luhansk. As of 2024, over the past 10 years, the company had launched 3G network on the Crimean peninsula with 100% coverage, and 4G network with 70% coverage in across the peninsula. In addition, equipment refarming were carried out, and domestic Russian systems were used. In March 2024, +7Telecom made purchasing SIM cards available at local post offices.

== Operations ==
K-Telecom operates on GSM, UMTS and LTE standards.

Frequencies used on the K-Telecom Network
Frequency	Band number	Protocol	Class	Brand	Coverage
900 MHz	8	GSM	2G	Win mobile, +7Telecom	Crimea, Sevastopol, Luhansk, Donetsk, Zaporozhye, Kherson
1800 MHz	3	GSM	2G	Win mobile, +7Telecom	Crimea, Sevastopol, Luhansk, Donetsk, Zaporozhye, Kherson
2100 MHz	1	UMTS	3G	Win mobile	Crimea, Sevastopol
2600 MHz	7	LTE	4G	Win mobile, +7Telecom	Crimea, Sevastopol, Luhansk, Donetsk, Zaporozhye, Kherson

== See also ==
- Telecommunications in Russia
- Mobile phone industry in Russia
