= Miranda (telecommunications company) =

Russian mobile network operator

OOO Miranda-Media
- Native name: ООО «Миранда-Медиа»
- Type: Limited liability company
- Industry: Telecommunications
- Founded: 2014; 12 years ago
- Area served: Crimea, Sevastopol, Luhansk, Donetsk, Zaporozhye, Kherson
- Products: cellular network, local telephone service, broadband, mobile television
- Parent: Rostelecom
- Website: www.miranda-media.ru

Miranda (Russian: Миранда) is a Russian telecommunications company and mobile network operator. As of 2025, it operates in Crimea, Sevastopol, Luhansk, Donetsk, Zaporozhye and Kherson regions.

Big four Russian mobile network operators MTS, MegaFon, t2 and Beeline have long avoided the internationally recognized occupied territories to avoid direct sanctions, which led to creation of separate mobile network operators like K-Telecom and Miranda. Miranda never implemented internal roaming charges while roaming on big four Russian mobile networks unlike K-Telecom.

As of 2024, Miranda operates on 800/900/1800 MHz GSM, UMTS and 450 MHz LTE standards.

== History ==
In 2014, following the start of Russo-Ukrainian war, Russian state-owned telecommunications company Rostelecom quickly deployed a 110Gbit/s submarine link from Russian mainland to the Crimean peninsula. Fixed line services were offered in Crimea and Sevastopol by Rostelecom's newly created local company Miranda Media, in absence of Ukrtelecom after its exit from Crimea. In 2022, following the 2022 annexation, Miranda launched its mobile network under the brand "Mir telecom" in Zaporozhye and Kherson. In 2023, Miranda launched its mobile network in Luhansk People's Republic and Donetsk People's Republic.

By January 2024, Miranda had restored internet access in Donetsk and Luhansk. In May 2024, Miranda launched its mobile network in Crimea and Sevastopol, having only provided fixed-line internet services in the regions between 2014 and 2024.

== See also ==
- Telecommunications in Russia
- Mobile phone industry in Russia
