= Bekhzod Akhmedov =

Uzbek businessman (born 1974)

- Born: February 14, 1974 (age 52); Tashkent, Uzbek SSR, USSR
- Occupation: businessman

Bekhzod Bakhodirovich Akhmedov (Russian: Бехзод Баходирович Ахмедов; born 14 February 1974) was the chief executive officer of Uzdunrobita, the Uzbek branch of the Russian telecommunication company MTS, until 2012. When Uzdunrobita's operating license was suspended by the government of Uzbekistan, Akhmedov left the country and since then has been wanted by Interpol.

Akhmedov is a graduate of the National University of Uzbekistan in economics in business.

== CEO of Uzdunrobita — MTS's Uzbek subsidiary ==
In the aftermath of the financial and logistics management investigation of MTS-Uzbekistan in 2012, the General Prosecutor's Office of the Republic of Uzbekistan launched a criminal case against Uzdunrobita for tax evasion and avoiding other obligatory payments on a large scale, employment activities without license, legalization of proceeds from criminal activity and other crimes. It was ascertained that for the 2008-2012 period when the company was led by Akhmedov, it owes the government up to 418.266 billion UZS.

Akhmedov illegally rendered goods, works and services for 306.683 billion soums (around $161 million) through regional branches. Through illegal mechanisms, Akhmedov managed to avoid taxes for 34.628 billion UZS (around $18 million). Akhmedov received bonuses in cash, and in 2012 was also presented with a villa in the elite cottage village "Gorki-8" near the Rublevo-Uspensk highway in Moscow.

On June 27, 2012, the Prosecutor General's Office stated on their website that investigation had found that staff of MTS-Uzbekistan had avoided taxes and broken other laws. Based on this investigation, Akhmedov was charged in his absence.

On 13 June (in other sources 19), MTS President Andrey Dubovskov in a letter to the prosecutor stated that MTS had been drawn into doubtful and illegal schemes of money laundering and tax evasion, and accused Akhmedov and other managers of MTS-Uzbekistan of dishonest management. Dubovskov's letter stated that MTS's headquarters was concerned that Akhmedov had not been to work and was in hiding instead of explaining conditions and eliminating violations.

Dubovskov requested that the Prosecutor General's Office of Uzbekistan use international mechanisms to find Akhmedov. Interpol issued a warrant for Akhmedov's arrest.

On 28 June, the Prosecutor General's Office announced that Akhmedov had escaped from Tashkent to Yerevan, where he and the vice-president of MTS Raspopov left for Moscow; therefore the Prosecutor General doubted MTS's willingness to cooperate in the investigation. On the same day MTS published a press release which accused Uzbekistan officials of making unfounded charges.

Later, it became known that Akhmedov escaped Uzbekistan on 6 June 2012, when he left for Kazakhstan. From there on 9 June he flew to Istanbul, then to Paris, then on to Yerevan and then on 19 June left for Moscow, where he remains.

== ТeliaSonera ==
In 2012 the Swedish mobile operator TeliaSonera was investigated regarding possible bribery and corruption in Uzbekistan. Akhmedov was involved in the suspect transaction as the representative of Gulnara Karimova. Harry Davies, writing in The Guardian in 2021, said "An influential player in Uzbek telecoms, Akhmedov would later be indicted in the US for his alleged role in the bribery scheme. The status of that case is unclear. Akhmedov has denied any wrongdoing".
