= Sputnik (search engine) =

Russian search engine

- Website type: Search engine Web browser
- Available in: Russian
- Owner: Rostelecom
- Website: www.sputnik.ru
- Commercial: Yes
- Registration: Optional, free
- Launched: May 22, 2014; 12 years ago
- Current status: publicly inactive, government use unclear

Sputnik was a search engine owned by Rostelecom, a Russian state-owned telecommunications company. It markets itself as an engine geared towards "local services". At the end of the week of the launch, it was responsible for 0.01% of the search engine traffic in Russia, compared with 62% for Yandex and 28% for Google. It went through the maximum in February 2016, with 11 thousands hits (compared with 121 million hits of Yandex). In January 2017, Sputnik was the 15th most popular search engine in Russia, with 1 / 32,000 times the hits of Yandex.

Despite the traction Sputnik first got during its release, the engine had two million visitors within the first week, but it was unable to compete with other search engines as time passed. In 2017, less than 1% of Russians used the engine, as they had a preference for Yandex and Google. The launch of Sputnik was deemed unsuccessful by the President of Rostelecom, Mikhail Oseevsky. In order to help bring in users, Oseevsky wanted to make Sputnik the primary search engine for government agencies and businesses, but he got little to no support for this.

Russia spent $20 million to create Sputnik. In 2015, Sputnik only brought in 136.6 million rubles in revenue. The company's lack of advertisement on the website and unpopularity took a toll on Sputnik. In 2018, Rostelecom filed Sputnik LLC for bankruptcy, the reason being the company was unable to pay its debt. The base amount of the loan taken out was 3 million rubles, but with interest acquired over time, it was 10.6 million rubles altogether.

Rostelecom officially took down the search box from the website in 2020. The only thing that remains of the site for visitors is links to other projects created by Rostelecom.

== Creation history ==
At the end of 2010, publications appeared in the media that the Russian government intended to allocate funds for a project to create a national general-purpose search system.

At the beginning of 2011, Dmitry Medvedev, who then held the post of President of the Russian Federation, supported the idea of creating its own search system in the Russian Federation. At that time, the state search service was planned to be created within the framework of the federal program “Electronic Government” . It was planned that the search engine could be launched in 2011.

The creation of a search system called “Sputnik” was announced in the fall of 2013, and its launch was planned in the first quarter of 2014 . It was stated that one of the prerequisites for the creation of the search system was the impossibility of controlling non-state search engines, namely their news feeds.

On May 22, 2014, the Sputnik project was presented at the St. Petersburg International Economic Forum (SPIEF) by Alexey Basov. On the same day, the Sputnik search engine began its work in the format of open beta testing (the director of Sputnik LLC explained the entry into open beta testing by saying that further development of the platform is impossible without interaction with real people; the end of the beta test was not announced reported) . In his speech at that SPIEF, Basov said that search engines have room to grow: 40% of Russian residents, one way or another, do not use the Internet or use it extremely rarely. And with the growing integration of the Internet into society, the demand for social services will grow.

On the first day of operation, Sputnik was visited by more than 500 thousand people, and in the first week about 2 million people took part in testing the portal.

In July 2016, 4.1 thousand people per day clicked on Sputnik search results per day, which is several orders of magnitude less than its competitors (for example, Yandex had 74.2 million people per day for the same period).

As of 2017, the project was considered unsuccessful and exists solely thanks to government support. The net loss of Sputnik LLC in 2017 amounted to more than 50 million rubles.

== Features ==
A feature that Rostelecom released on Sputnik was Stalker. This feature was released to alert users when they have come across dangerous viruses and/or malware.

== Browser ==
Sputnik Browser
- Release: September 30, 2015; 11 years ago

Stable release(s) [±]
- Windows 5.6.6291.0 (November 16, 2021; 4 years ago) iOS 2.3.8 (June 20, 2018; 8 years ago) Android 1.3.3.166 (June 11, 2021; 5 years ago) [±]
- Written in: C++, JavaScript
- Engine: Blink
- Operating system: Windows; Android; iOS; Linux
- Platform: IA-32, x86-64
- Available in: Russian language
- Type: Web browser
- License: Freeware
- Website: sputnik-lab.com

There is an associated web browser, also Sputnik, derived from Chromium.

== Other platforms ==
In early 2015, a smartphone version of Sputnik was released for smartphones and tablets and in late 2015, a version came out for PC for OS and Windows.
