= Rostelecom =

Russian telecommunications company

PJSC Rostelecom
- Logo since 2018

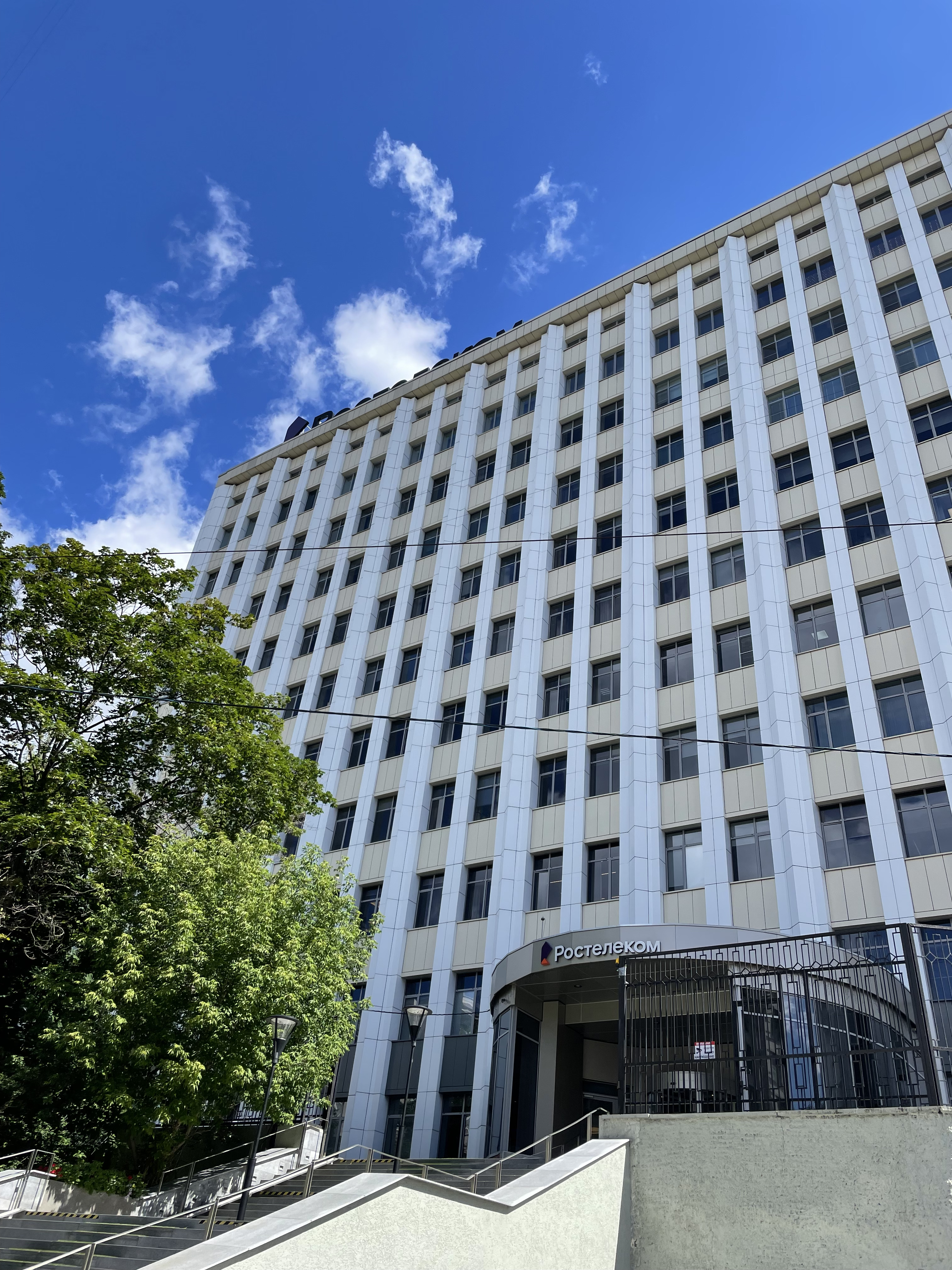
- Rostelecom's main building in Moscow, photographed in 2022
- Type: Public (OAO), state owned
- Traded as: MCX: RTKM
- Industry: Telecommunications
- Founded: 23 September 1993; 33 years ago
- Headquarters: Moscow, Russia
- Key people: Mikhail Oseevsky (President); Dmitry Medvedev (Chairman of the Board of Directors)
- Products: Mobile Telephony; Broadband Internet; IPTV, OTT & Cable television, Data centers Cloud Solutions; Cybersecurity Services; Digital Region services E-government Solutions.
- Revenue: $10.2 billion (2025)
- Operating income: $1.75 billion (2025)
- Net income: $22 million (2025)
- Total assets: $16.8 billion (2025)
- Total equity: $3.29 billion (2025)
- Number of employees: 136,700
- Subsidiaries: t2, RTK-DC, DataLine, Central Telegraph, Giprosvyaz, Miranda, MANGO OFFICE etc
- Website: rt.ru

Rostelecom (Russian: Ростелеком) is Russia's largest provider of digital services for a wide variety of consumers, households, private businesses, government and municipal authorities, and other telecom providers. Rostelecom interconnects all local public operators' networks into a single national network for long-distance service. In other words, if one makes a long-distance call or originates Internet contact to or from Russia, Rostelecom is likely providing part of the service. The company's stock trades primarily on the Moscow Exchange.

== History ==
Before 1990, the Ministry of Communications of the USSR provided telecommunications services. On 26 June 1990, the Ministry established a state-owned joint-stock company, Sovtelekom, which obtained the rights to operate the USSR's telecommunications network. On 30 December 1992, by order of the State Property Committee of Russia, a state-owned enterprise, Rostelecom, was established. It consisted of 20 state-owned long-distance and international call lines, as well as Intertelekom communication equipment.

Throughout the 1990s, the company, which was a part of Svyazinvest, was the sole long-distance operator in Russia. Alongside it, local companies operated in the different regions of Russia under the umbrella of Svyazinvest, while Rostelecom connected its networks. In 2001, these companies were merged to form several regional incumbent telecommunications operators: CentreTelecom, SibirTelecom, Dalsvyaz, Uralsvyazinform, VolgaTelecom, North-West Telecom, Southern Telecommunications Company, and Dagsvyazinform. In 2011, Svyazinvest was liquidated, with its regional subsidiaries merged into Rostelecom. In 2021, the company's revenue amounted to 351 billion rubles.

On 18 October 2006, "Rostelecom" received a certificate of quality of IP-MPLS network and became the ISP backbone. In December 2006, Rostelecom and the telecommunications company KDDI in Japan under the "Transit Europe - Asia" signed an agreement to build a line of Nakhodka - Naoetsu with total bandwidth of 640 Gbit/s instead of the previous 560 Mbit/s.

In 2023, Rostelecom stated that Chinese state-backed cyberattacks by several known advanced persistent threats were a top concern.

In December 2025, Rostelecom CEO Mikhail Oseevsky announced that the company's board of directors had approved plans for an initial public offering (IPO) of its cybersecurity subsidiary, Solar Group. Oseevsky stated that the company was targeting the first half of 2026 for the IPO, though the exact timing would depend on market conditions. He also noted that another subsidiary, RTC-Data Center (a joint venture with VTB Bank), was at a high level of readiness for its own listing, but its IPO was also contingent on the monetary market situation

=== Sanctions ===
On 24 February 2022, in response to the Russian invasion of Ukraine, the Office of Foreign Assets Control (OFAC) of the United States Department of the Treasury imposed sanctions against Rostelecom.

== Ownership ==
Owners of Rostelecom ordinary (voting) share as of November 2021:

- Federal Agency for State Property Management (38.2%)
- JSC Telecom Investments (20.98%)
- VTB Bank (8.44%)
- Vnesheconombank (3.96%)

== Operations ==
PJSC Rostelecom is the largest integrated digital services and products provider, operating in all segments of the telecommunications market in Russia. The company serves a multitude of households, state and private enterprises across the country.

Rostelecom is a company that provides solutions in the following fields: E-Government, cybersecurity, Beeline and MTS data-centres and cloud computing, biometry, healthcare, education and housing & utility services.

In the summer of 2019, it was announced that Rostec plans to develop digital healthcare together with PJSC Rostelecom.

=== Land network ===
The company is based on extant Russian fiber-optic cable lines - FOCL. By cable, the network is connected to countries in Europe and East Asia.

Fiber-optic cable lines crosses Russian Federation on directions «Moscow — Novorossiysk», «Moscow — Khabarovsk» and «Moscow — Saint Petersburg».

IP transit has been allocated to a separate company, RTComm, using Rostelecom's STM-16 FOCL resources, but Rostelecom is building its own STM-64 (9,9533 Gbit/s) network, which as of August 2006, covered Rostov-on-Don, Krasnodar, Volgograd, Stavropol, and planned to cover the whole of Russia by the end of 2006.

Rostelecom had 29.2 million local fixed-line voice subscribers, 12.4 million mobile voice subscribers, 7.4 million fixed-line broadband subscribers, and 5.5 million pay-TV subscribers at the end of the first quarter of 2010.

=== Satellite network ===
Using the services of the Russian Orbital Group, Rostelecom has built its satellite system for its Eastern region, comprising 11 land stations in Siberia and the Russian Far East. Satellite service for the Western region is being built at this time.

=== Cellular network ===
Throughout the 90s, Rostelecom created subsidiaries that operated cellular networks in different regions of the country, including NSS, Baikalvestkom, Yeniseikom, SkyLink, Volgograd GSM, and Akos, which provided mobile services on the territory of 59 regions of Russia, serving more than 13.5 million subscribers. During the 2010s, Rostelecom and its subsidiaries built third-generation mobile networks in 27 regions of Russia. Total planned to install more than 8 thousand base stations. Suppliers of equipment and solutions for the 3G+ network are Ericsson and Huawei. In April 2013, the company announced the launch of 3G+ networks in the Sverdlovsk, Kurgan, and Chelyabinsk regions, in the south of the Tyumen Oblast, and in the Yamalo-Nenets Autonomous Area. MegaFon and Tele2 and SkyLink This launch followed the introduction of 3G+ services in Perm Krai. Rostelecom's 3G+ network was installed using HSPA+ technology, providing data transfer speeds of up to 21 MB/s. The network can be upgraded to reach speeds of up to 42 MB/s if demand requires it. The 3G+ network is LTE-ready, so that only minor modifications will be required before the company cancompanyut its 4G (LTE) network in the future. In June 2013 Rostelecom launched its first part of its LTE network in Sochi for the 2014 Winter Olympics. Besides, the company laucompanyTE networks in 8 other regions besides Karsnodar Krai by the end of 2013, including Khanty-Mansi Autonomous Okrug, Republic of Khakassia, Republic of North Ossetia–Alania, Sakhalin Oblast, Chukotka Autonomous Okrug, Nenets Autonomous Okrug and the Jewish Autonomous Oblast.

In December 2013, the Rostelecom board approved a plan to merge its mobile business into Tele2 Russia, a former division of the Nordic telecoms group Tele2, which sold it in April 2013 to VTB Bank due to the lack of 3G and 4G data licences, limiting its future growth prospects. Rostelecom would get a 45% voting stake in the new company, T2companylding, in exchange for contributing its standalone mobile subsidiaries and assets, including SkyLink. Tele2 Russia, owned by state-controlled bank VTB and Russian businessmen Yuri Kovalchuk and Alexei Mordashov, will have 55%. Rostelecom and Tele2 Russia together have around 38 million mobile subscribers, or a combined market share of 16%. During the second stage, Rostelecom spun-off its integrated mobile businesses into its new wholly owned subsidiary, RT-Mobile (Russian: РТ-Мобайл), which will be expected to have Rostelecom's mobile licences, including the LTE licences, re-issued to it. Analysts said the deal makes sense as "Rostelecom has been less efficient in rolling out mobile networks. By relying on the Tele2 team in mobile expansion Rostelecom removes risks, while remaining open to an upside". In February 2014 Rostelecom and Tele2 signed a framework agreement on the integration of mobile assets to the authorized capital of the joint venture "T2 Rus Holding". At the first stage of integration, Rostelecom passed seven cellular subsidiaries it owns: "Sky Link", "Nizhny Novgorod Cellular Communications", "Baikalwestcom", " Volgograd GSM" Yenisei Telecom" and ICCO.

Network infrastructure

- Backbone network
- Regional backhaul network
- International networks
- Access networks (FTTB, GPON)

== Controversy ==
In April 2017, Rostelecom (AS12389) originated 50 prefixes for numerous other autonomous systems (AS). This caused Internet traffic, which was usually destined for these organizations, to be routed instead to Rostelecom. The hijacked prefixes belonged to financial institutions (most notably MasterCard and Visa), other telecom companies, and a variety of different organizations. What makes the list of affected networks 'curious' is the high number of financial institutions such as: MasterCard, Visa, Fortis, Alfa-Bank, and more. The other notable characteristic of this event is that the advertisement included several more prefixes that were more specifically defined than the prefixes normally announced, which makes it less likely that these were unintentionally leaked.

In 2017, state-owned Rostelecom was selected to run a Russian national biometric database, with Russian legislators adopting a law to oblige banks and state agencies to enter their customers' biometric information, including facial images and voice samples, into the database.

== See also ==
- List of telecommunications regulatory bodies
