= Giprosvyaz =

Russian telecommunications company

Coordinates: 55.7818°N 37.4998°E

- Company type: Public joint-stock company
- Industry: Telecommunications
- Founded: 1932
- Headquarters: Moscow, Russia
- Website: Official website

Giprosvyaz (Russian: Гипросвязь) is a Russian (formerly Soviet) institute for design of structures for communications. Its current legal status is open joint stock company, PJSC Giprosvyaz (Russian: ОАО Гипросвязь). The name is an abbreviation of the full name of the former Soviet institute: State Institute on Surveying and Design of Communications Structures (Государственный институт по изысканиям и проектированию сооружений связи) The majority of the shares are held by Rostelecom, Russia's largest telecommunications company.

== History ==
The institution was established in 1932 as a trust Svyazproyekt (Связьпроект). Its main task was statewide surveying of suitable locations and design of postal offices, telephone, and telegraph exchanges, and communications lines. It was reorganized into an institute and renamed accordingly in 1951. It was headquartered in Moscow and had subsidiaries in major regional centres. The first ones were in Leningrad, Kiev, Tbilisi, Minsk, Novosibirsk, Kuybyshev. Later more of them were established. Some of them were reorganized into independent institutes (1973: Leningrad, Kiev, Novosibirsk, 1978: Tbilisi, Minsk, Kuybyshev). After the dissolution of the Soviet Union they went into various post-Soviet States. In Russia, all subsidiaries have become independent companies: Giprosvyaz Spb in St. Petersburg, Giprosvyaz-4 (ru:Гипросвязь-4) in Novosibirsk, Giprosvyaz-Samara in Samara (former Kuybyshev).

== Directors ==
CEO - Malysh Alexey Anatolyevich.
