= Uzdunrobita =

Uzdunrobita was the largest mobile phone operator in Uzbekistan in the 1990s and 2000s.

Uzdunrobita was founded on August 19, 1991, as a joint venture between a group of American investors, the International Communications Group, with a 45% stake; and the government of what was then the Uzbek Soviet Socialist Republic, with a 55% stake. When Uzbekistan declared independence several weeks later, the registration of the joint venture was shifted from Moscow to Tashkent, with the government stake taken over by the independent Uzbek government. Shortly thereafter, to overcome a shortage of capital, the American investors sold more than half their stake to a group of Pakistani investors, for $2 million and a stake in a Pakistani pay-phone company. The Uzbek government additionally provided free equipment and use of its engineers and staff. The American investors included a group from Perry, Ga, that consisted of a dentist, an eye doctor, an insurance man, an engineer and a stockbroker organized by the red-haired Brian L. Bowen, who was 37 years old in 1996.

The company first turned a profit in 1993. By 1996, it had $50 million in annual revenues, 7,000 subscribers, and employed 224 staff. Gulnora Karimova gained control of the firm in the late 1990s or early 2000s, and by 2005 it was 74% owned by Russia's MTS, which paid $121 million for the stake. In 2006 it was reported to have 250,000 subscribers, ahead of Daewoo Unitel, which had 100,000, and a number of much smaller firms.

The company launched an LTE network on 2.6GHz in July 2010, and receive a license to expand it on 700MHz in December 2010.

In August 2012, the government of Uzbekistan revoked the company's operating license and arrested several of its top management, citing repeated regulatory violations. MTS protested the action as a "shakedown", but was unable to effectively oppose it, and moved to write down its stake. At the completion of the case in September 2012, the company's assets were seized, and some of its executives sentenced to prison terms. The company's chief executive, Bekhzod Akhmedov, described as "at the heart of ... [the] dispute", left Uzbekistan and Interpol issued a warrant for his arrest.
