= Sky Link (Russia) =

Sky Link LLC "T2 Mobile"
- Native name: Скайлинк; ООО "Т2 Мобайл"
- Company type: Limited liability company
- Industry: Mobile telecommunications
- Founded: 1991
- Headquarters: Moscow, Russia
- Area served: Moscow, Moscow oblast, Novgorod oblast, Saint Petersburg, Leningrad oblast, Tver oblast of Russia
- Products: Mobile networks
- Revenue: ▲$0.3 billion USD (2011)
- Website: www.skylink.ru

Sky Link (Russian: Скайлинк) is a mobile LTE 450 MHz (formerly CDMA-450 MHz) operator in Russia. Licensed territories of Sky Link include 76 entities of Russia, CDMA-450 and UMTS-1900/2100 licenses in 65 regions, CDMA-450/2000 licenses in 3 regions, GSM-1800 licenses in 45 regions and a GSM-900 license in 1.

== History ==
Moscow Cellular Communications - the oldest mobile operator in Moscow, in force since December 1991. Until 2005, the work was done in the analogue NMT-450 standard (and NMT-450i).

In 2003, in connection with the transition from analog cellular networks to digital company merged with other Russian operators NMT-450, to create a unified brand, called Sky Link.

As of May 2011, MegaFon the operating company of "Sky Link", which offers services under this brand in Moscow and the Central Region of the country, Sotel is OJSC "Moscow Cellular Communications", St. Petersburg - JSC "Delta Telecom" [3] the oldest mobile phone operator in Russia, which has been working in the North-West region since 1991. [4]

22 December 2010 the management of "Sky Link" reported the launch of the GSM network in all regions for which the license was obtained, but in fact none of the subjects of the Russian Federation, Tele2 a network of GSM and does not work.

2014 "Tele2 Russia" gained control of "Sky Link". The transaction was part of the merger of Rostelecom-Mobile assets.

25 May 2016 the management of "Sky Link" reported the launch of the LTE network in 4 regions in 450 MHz-spectrum.
