= Moscow City Telephone Network =

Telephone company

- Type: Joint stock
- Traded as: MCX: MGTS
- Industry: Telecommunications
- Founded: 13 July 1882; 144 years ago
- Headquarters: Moscow
- Products: Cell phone network
- Revenue: $558 million (2021; 2022)
- Operating income: $211 million (2021; 2022)
- Net income: $206 million (2021; 2022)
- Total assets: $1.79 billion (2021; 2022)
- Total equity: $1.36 billion (2021; 2022)
- Parent: MTS
- Website: business.mgts.ru

The Moscow City Telephone Network (MCTN; Russian: Московская городская телефонная сеть, romanized: Moskovskaja Gorodskaja Telefonnaja Set' (MGTS)) is a public joint-stock company providing local telephone and internet service to over 4,000,000 subscribers in the city of Moscow, Russia. Its Latin acronym is MGTS.

== History ==
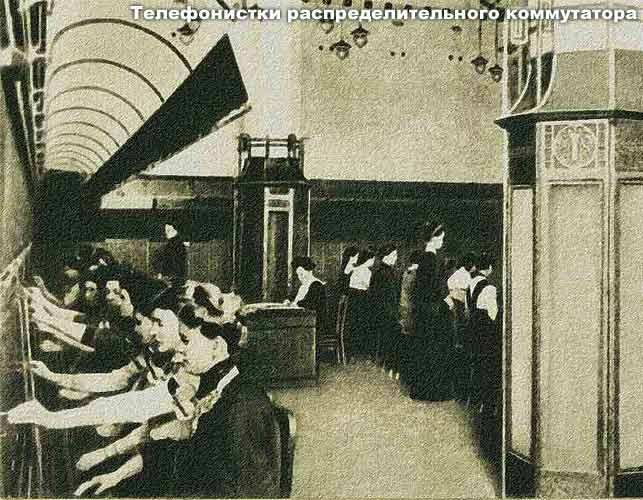
The exchange of Moscow City Telephone Network in 1890

Founded in 1882, the Bell Telephone Company built a manually operated exchange with a capacity of 800 numbers and 26 households signed up. In two years the roll had increased to 3,000. In 1891 the Swedish-Danish-Russian Joint Stock Company signed a contract to provide service to Moscow for 18 years. In 1994 the Moscow City Telephone Network was structured into a joint stock company. A majority stake is held by Mobile TeleSystems.

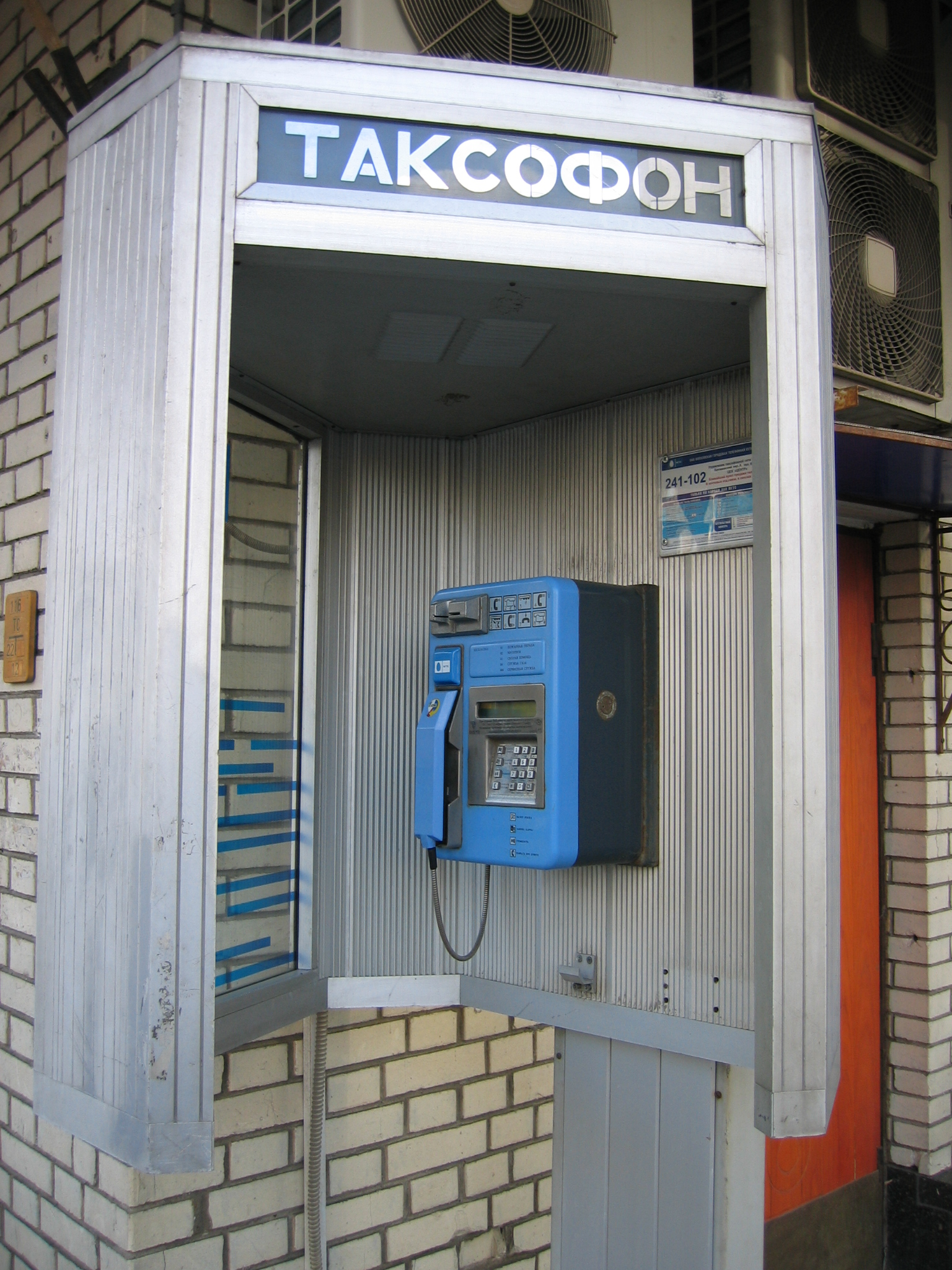
A MGTS payphone in Moscow, 2007

In November 2013 it was reported that the company chose four suppliers of main and distribution of fiber optic cables for the development of optical fiber cables network until 2016 volume of purchases made more than 1 billion rubles. Earlier that month the company announced rebranding and new positioning of the company as a multi-service operator, to create a single digital platform of Moscow. In 2014 the operator will complete the construction of a dagital technology platform based on fiber networks to buildings (FTTx) and will provide all users access to a package of services, including broadband Internet access (broadband), digital TV, and telephony. By late 2013 The company has built about 25 thousand kilometers connecting 650,000 households in Moscow.

In January 2014 it was reported that the Moscow Government plans to revoke MGTS monopoly on public telephones, which the company had since 1994, and to select a new operator that will add completely new device features, such as parking fees payment option.

In May 2021 MTS President Vyacheslav Nikolaev announced MGTS slit-off, as well as other telecom, IT, and cloud-focused companies to MTS Web Services legal entity by the end of the year 2021.

In August 2021 Albert Gilmanov, MGTS ex-COO and member of the board of directors, was appointed MGTS CEO with a three-year contract in place of Vladislav Medvedev, who previously headed MGTS from November 2019 and will continue his MGTS challenge as CTO.

== Management ==
CEO - Gilmanov Albert Timurovich (2024).
