= Mikhail Oseevsky =

Russian politician

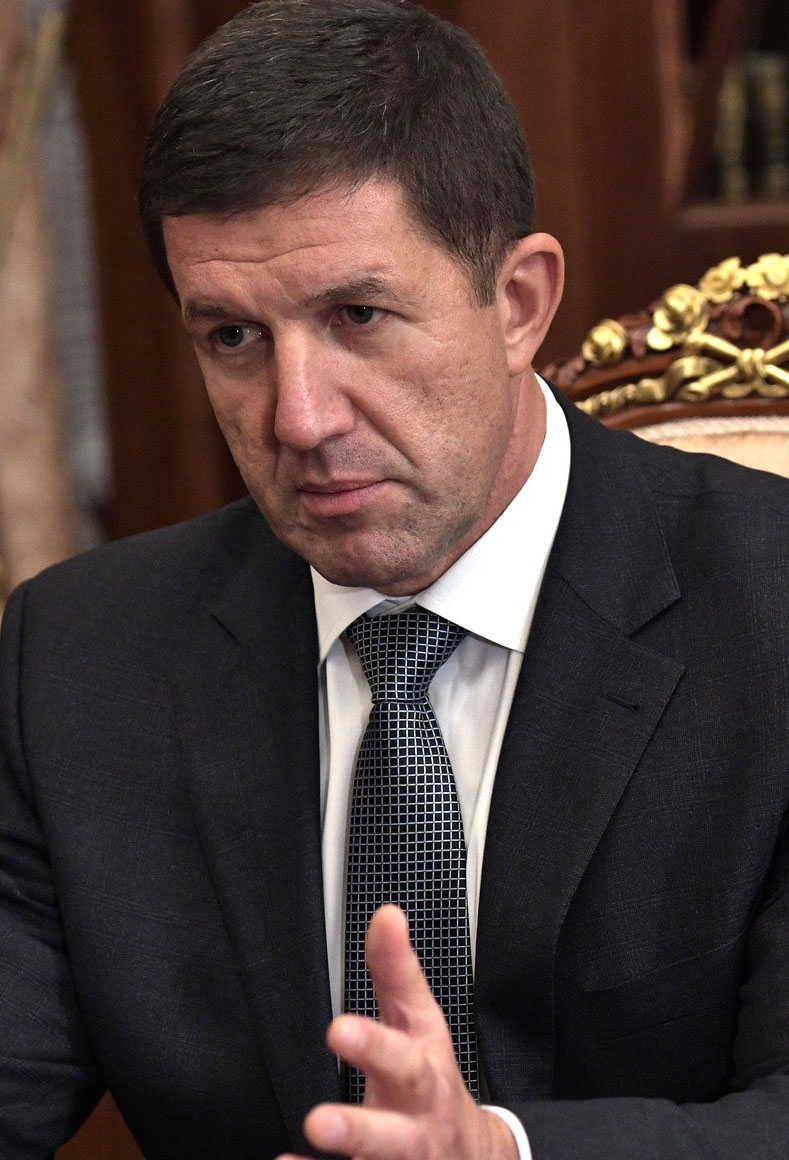

Deputy-Minister of Economic Development of Russia
- Incumbent
- Assumed office 6 January 2012

Vice-Governor of Saint Petersburg
- In office 15 November 2003 – 6 January 2012

Personal details
- Born: Mikhail Eduardovich Oseevsky; 30 November 1960 (age 65) Leningrad, Russian SFSR, Soviet Union
- Party: United Russia
- Education: The Kalinin Institute of Electro Mechanics of Leningrad

Mikhail Eduardovich Oseevsky (Russian: Осеевский Михаил Эдуардович, born 30 November 1960) is a Russian politician, a member of United Russia party. From 2003 to 2012, he was the Vice-governor of Saint Petersburg and the Minister of Finance in the Saint Petersburg City Administration, appointed to these positions by then-governor, Valentina Matvienko. From 2010 to 2012, he was also the Head of the Administration of the St. Petersburg Governor. On 6 January 2012, he was appointed Deputy-Minister of Economic Development of Russia.

== Sanctions ==
On 8 March 2022, Oseevsky was set on a list of sanctions by European Union.

He was sanctioned by the UK government in 2022 in relation to the Russo-Ukrainian War.
