= T2 (telecommunications company) =

Mobile service provider in Russia

t2
- Type: Limited liability company
- Industry: Mobile Telecommunications
- Founded: 2003; 23 years ago
- Founder: Tele2 AB
- Headquarters: Moscow, Russia
- Area served: Russia
- Products: Mobile networks
- Revenue: ₽ 192 billion (Q4 2024)
- Net income: ₽ 75 billion (Q4 2024)
- Owner: Rostelecom
- Number of employees: 7000+
- Website: t2.ru

t2 (formerly Tele2 Russia) is the third largest telecommunications company in Russia, originally founded by Swedish Tele2. Since 2020, Tele2 Russia is a wholly owned subsidiary of Rostelecom. As of Q3 2024, t2 provides wireless services to more than 48 million subscribers.

As of March 2025, T2 is present in 70 subjects of Russia. t2 Russia functions as a group of companies, and the parent structure of the holding is named Limited Liability Company "T2 RTK Holding" with the headquarters in Moscow.

== History ==
The history of the company began in the 1990s when the American-Swedish Millicom International Cellular established mobile network operators which provided D-AMPS services in various regions of Russia. In 2001 Millicom sold its Russian assets to the Swedish holding Tele2, which started implementing GSM services in its networks and moved them to their own brand.

Tele2 started operations in Russia in 2003. Within the first two years of operation in the Russian market (2003–2004) Tele2 started providing services in 12 regions. In 2011 the number of Tele2 users exceeded 20 million.

On March 27, 2013, it was announced that the Swedish group Tele2 decided to sell its Russian subsidiary Tele2 Russia to the VTB Group. On April 4 the deal was completed.

On October 17, 2013, the VTB Group closed the selling of 50% of Tele2 Russia shares to a consortium of private investors holding the Rossiya Bank, including Yury Kovalchuk (the Chairman of the Board of Directors of the Rossiya Bank) and Alexei Mordashov (the Severstal co-owner), and also 5% of the shares were sold to Sogaz insurance group.

On February 6, 2014, Rostelecom and Tele2 Russia signed a framed agreement on integration of mobile assets into the ownership capital of the joint venture (JV) T2 Rus Holding. This deal resulting in creation of a new federal high roller on the cellular market was completed within a year. According to the terms of the agreement, Rostelecom transferred its assets to the JV and became one of the stakeholders of the merged company. The joint venture was created on the basis of T2 Rus Holding (later renamed into T2 RTK Holding), which owns all the operating companies of Tele2 Russia.

On March 28, 2014, the first stage of the deal on integration of Rostelecom mobile assets and creation of a new federal cell operator was completed. Seven Rostelecom subsidiaries — Sky Link, Nizhny Novgorod Communications, Baikalvestcom, BIT, Volgograd GSM, ETK and AKOS-came under the operational and financial control of Tele2 Russia. Tele2 Russia also gained operational control over Rostelecom's mobile integrated assets (Eline GSM, Tambov GSM, Uralsvyazinform, Dalsvyaz) through RT-Mobile, an affiliate of Rostelecom, established on April 1, 2014. As a result, Rostelecom became the joint venturer with a share in the authorized capital of 45% in votes and 26% of economic share.

On August 5, 2014, earlier than scheduled, Rostelecom completed the second and final stage of the deal with Tele2 Russia to create a new federal mobile operator, having transferred 100% of the shares of its affiliate RT-Mobile to the joint venture (JV). As part of the reorganization, Rostelecom's integrated mobile assets were allocated to RT-Mobile and also the licenses were reissued for the company. The deal resulted in transfer of all Rostelecom's mobile assets to the JV. Consequently, Rostelecom became the joint venturer with a share in the authorized capital of 45% in votes and 45% of economic share, and Tele2 Russia represented by the newly established T2 RTK Holding gained a share in the authorized capital of 55% in votes and 55% of economic share, meaning that Tele2 Russia took control over the joint venture. Thus, it was the completion of creation of a national mobile operator with a wide range of licenses and frequencies throughout the country (including 3G and LTE), which was present in 64 regions and had a significant share of 16% on the cellular market, provided by more than 38 million mobile subscribers.

On June 16, 2015, the mobile operator completed their corporate restructuring by associating 33 operational companies of the holding to its main structure T2 Mobile. The restructuring neither required financial contributions nor left jobcut behind it. As a result, the number of legal bodies within the structure of Tele2 Russia was fairly reduced. The parent company is T2 RTK Holding, and its wholly owned subsidiary Т2-Mobile undertakes business operations under the "Tele2" brand.

On February 12, 2020, Rostelecom entered into a legally binding agreement on purchasing of 55% of T2 RTK Holding shares with VTB Bank and a consortium of investors. The settlement and transfer of ownership as part of the 100%-share consolidation transaction was completed on March 16, 2020.

On September 4, 2024, the company rebranded and changed its name to "t2".

Logo until September 4, 2024

Logo since September 4, 2024

== Ownership ==
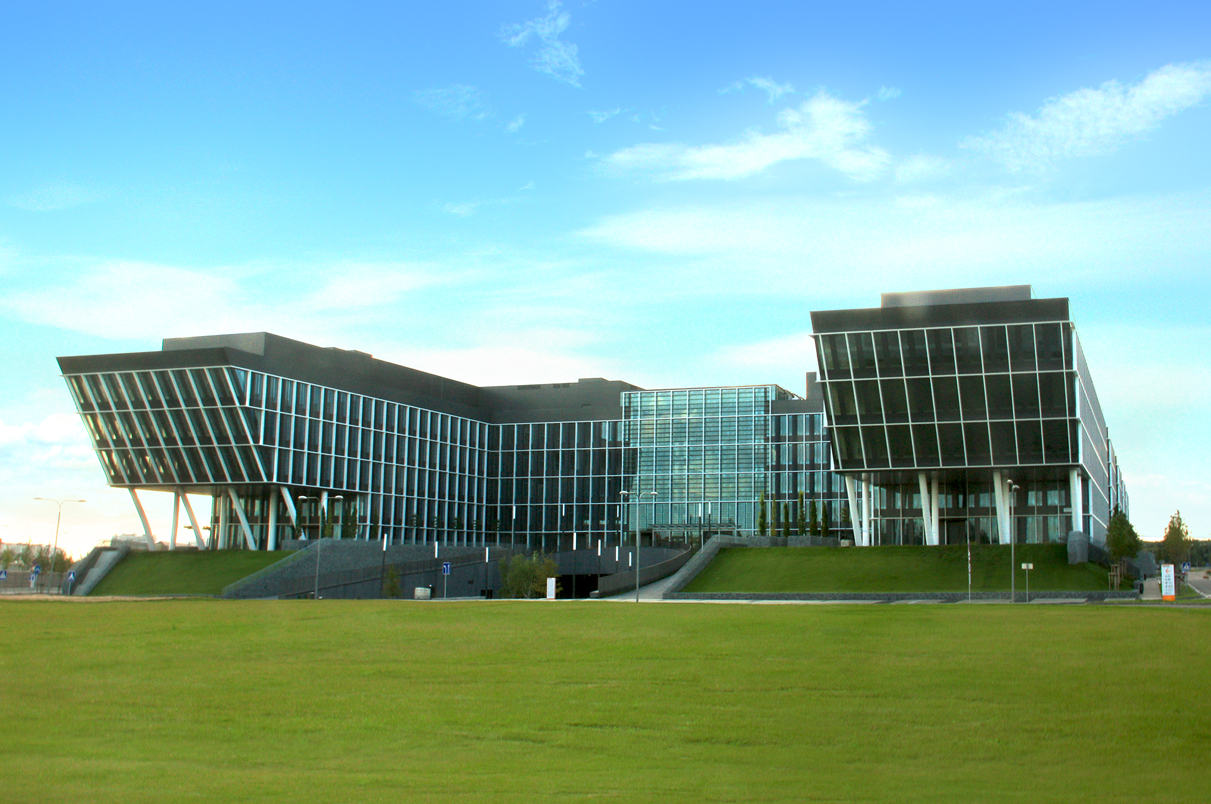
t2 headquarters in Moscow

Since February 2020 the company is 100% owned by Rostelecom.

Up until February 2020 each of the shareholders of T2RTK Holding had the right of preemption of the operator's share. This rule was rooted in the holding's Charter and it meant that if any of the owners received a proposal to sell his stake in total or partially, another owner could buy the stock at the price of the proposal within 30 days since the moment the third party claiming for purchase made the share sale offer.

In March 2019 it got about that Rostelecom would become the sole owner of Tele2 Russia, increasing its equity stake up to 100%. The information about it came up in January, and in February the Federal Agency for State Property Management (Rosimushchestvo) gave resolution to increase the share of the state-owned company.

On March 12, 2019, it was announced that agreements on consolidating 100% of Tele2 Russia by Rostelecom were reached. It is specified that Rostelecom plans to preserve the brand and management of the company. According to Rostelecom's President Mikhail Oseevsky: Tele2 Russia has a strong team which proved successful with their results.

On February 12, 2020, Rostelecom received 100% of T2 RTK Holding. 17.5% of Tele2 shares was bought with own funds of the public operator; 27.5% was funded by the additional issue of Rostelecom shares in benefit of VTB, a further 10% was an exchange for 10% of its own common stock owned by its subsidiary Mobitel. On March 16, 2020, the settlement and ownership transfer as part of the 100%-share consolidation transaction was completed.

== Operations ==
t2 in Russia is a mobile network operator providing services under the standards GSM, 3G and LTE. Before it was sold to VTB, it had been the only foreign company successfully operating on the Russian cellular market. Until 2013, Russia for Tele2 AB was the major market, which, as of 2010, provided more than a half of subscribers in total and 34.7% (the biggest percentage among all the countries) of EBITDA.

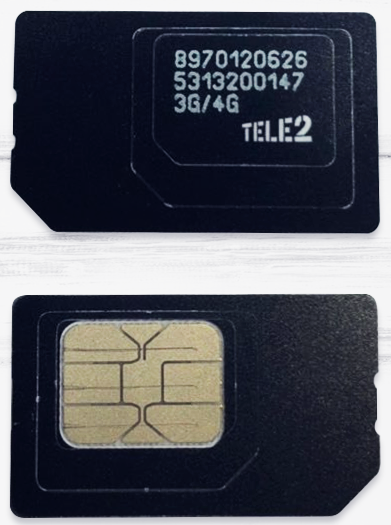
Tele2 2018 SIM card

In March 2020 the company reported on financial and operational results for 2019. As compared to 2018, Tele2 Russia revenue rose 14% to 163,3 billion roubles, at year-end 2019, the net profit totaled 6,6 billion roubles, the EBITDA increased by 50% and amounted to 65,6 billion roubles. As of December 31, 2019, the Tele2 Russia subscriber base counted 44.6 million people which is 5,3% more than in 2018. The average revenue per user (ARPU) also increased by 8,3% to 305 roubles.

According to the Federal Service for Supervision of Communications, Information Technology and Mass Media (Roskomnadzor), in 2018, Tele2 demonstrated the best result of the LTE networks development rate within the sector, having doubled the number of LTE cell sites.

=== Lifestyle enabler ===
Originally, Tele2 Russia just like the Swedish company positioned itself as a discounter, accentuating the lowest price within the market. In 2016 the company made a decision to move beyond and developed a new strategy named Lifestyle enabler.

The model Lifestyle enabler means that Tele2 Russia supports its clients' interests in all areas of life. Within the frames of this strategy, the operator creates services beyond the telecom industry in partnership with other business sectors. So that, in 2017 they launched a joint service with the Clouty online platform, which is an aggregator of online retailers. In June 2018 a digital medicine project – an application allowing to get a telemedical advice - was launched in partnership with the company Doc+. Among the other programs of the operator, there is an affiliate loyalty program with cashback to a mobile account, taxi services (joint service with Gett).

In October 2017 Tele2 Russia started a loyalty program named "Bolshe" (En: More) which was intended for subscribers' personal preferences. The operator offered to the customers an opportunity to save by two ways: either with the use of cashback or with discounts for partners' goods and services. When choosing the cashback, a subscriber can get up to 40% of a product's cost to his mobile account. The money can be spent for mobile services or mobile commerce "Payments and transfers". Any Tele 2 Russia subscriber, except for corporate plans users, can participate in the loyalty program. The program's partners include Yandex, Shokoladnitsa, AliExpress, Kino.Mail and others.

=== Communication platform "Other Rules" ===
In the beginning of 2017 the operator presented a new communication strategy for 2017–2021. The new concept involves an emphasis on innovative products that reflect the preferences of subscribers and support their lifestyle, and on excellent customer. The launch of the strategy was accompanied by the change of the corporate identity and slogan of the company. The new slogan sounds like "Tele2. Other rules".

New opportunities were announced at the strategy presentation: possibility to transfer the unused minutes and internet traffic to the next month. This new feature, unique for the Russian market, demonstrates the ideology of the new platform creating visibility and advantages for subscribers. In October 2017, also first-ever on the Russian communications market, an additional feature was introduced – exchange of minutes to gigabytes.

On September 25, 2019, Tele2 Russia launched one-of-a-kind on the Russian telecom-market platform 'Tele2 Exchange'. This service allows subscribers from all over the country to post offers for sale of unemployed minutes and Gigabytes from their plan package and backward to buy them from a number of lots posted at the Exchange. The money from the sales goes to the mobile account and the subscriber can spend it to pay for the telecom services. Within the first month after the launch the service was used by 2.5 million people.

=== eSIM ===
On April 29, 2019, Tele2 was the first in Russia to present an opportunity to switch over to eSIM in Moscow and Moscow region.

- In April 2019 MTS, Megafon and Beeline made a stand against adoption of eSIM in Russia.

On May 14, 2019, at the decision of the Ministry of Digital Development, Communications and Mass Media (Minkomsvyaz), the release of Tele2 Russia eSim was suspended. On 20 September 2019 the Ministry lifted the ban.

=== 5G ===
In August 2019 Tele2 Russia in association with Ericsson launched the first in Russia pilot 5G zone in Tverskaya Street in Moscow providing full outdoor coverage from the Kremlin to the Garden Ring. The pilot 5G zone operates in the 28 GHz band in NSA (Non-standalone) mode, which allows deployment of 5G in LTE networks and simplifies the implementation of the latest standard at the initial stage.

On August 23, 2019, the company performed testing of subscriber equipment in the pilot 5G network. The device based on Qualcomm® mobile platform Snapdragon™ demonstrated a peak throughput of about 2.1Gbit/s and a minimum latency of 9 msec.

In October 2019 the company launched cloud games in the flagship store in Tverskaya street in Moscow to show the difference in the quality of gaming when connected to 4G and 5G networks. The game runs on a remote server, only the "picture" is transmitted to the user's device. During the cloud game in 5G network the company achieved the speed of more than 1Gbit/s with a latency of 5 msec.

February 17, 2020 Tele2 conducted the first live broadcast on 5G networks in the urban environment in Russia. The live-stream was broadcast by Sony Xperia 5G device outdoors, on Tverskaya Street and Theater Square, in conditions of heavy traffic. During the tests, Sony mobile terminal based on the Qualcomm Snapdragon 855 chip and Qualcomm Snapdragon X50 modem provided a stable connection.

On August 15, 2020, Tele2 in association with a Swiss mobile operator Sunrise Tele2 launched 5G service for Russian subscribers arriving to Switzerland. The smartphones with fifth generation network support connect the 5G automatically when roaming.

=== "MVNO Factory" ===
In 2016, Tele2 Russia started to create mobile virtual network operators (MVNOs) – operators which do not have their own infrastructure and therefore use the network of another mobile operator. It is usually established by businesses with extensive client base for providing mobile services to customers on their own account. By November 2017, there were more than 10 MNVOs (most of them in Russia) on the basis of Tele2, of these, Rostelecom, Sberbank, Multiregional TransitTelecom and Tinkoff Bank. In November, the company launched their own MVNE-platform (mobile virtual network enabler), a set of standard systems, including billing, CRM, analytics tools and other components necessary for the work of MVNOs. With this platform, Tele2 Russia announced intention to streamline launching of MNVOs and create dozens of them each year. The company named this strategy "MNVO Factory". Within 2018, the number of Tele2-based MVNO subscribers increased by 75% to 1.75 million people.

According to the results of 2019, there are more than 20 Tele2-based MNVOs (the majority of them in Russia), including Rostelecom, Sbermobile, MTT, Tinkoff Mobile, VTB Mobile. Their subscriber base reckons 3,75 million people, compared with last year, this figure increased by 115%.

== Corporate responsibility ==
In 2019, Tele2 launched the Pereplavka environmental project aimed at sensibilization of the necessity to process e-waste and stated it was the first project for the ecological disposal of phones. It contributed to the United Nations' SDG 12 "Responsible Consumption and Production" and increased the environmental awareness of Russians. Alena Dymchishina, the project manager of Pereplavka, said "The aim of the project is to draw the clients' attention to the problem of recycling electronic waste". Everyone who brought an old device for recycling before November 1 received prizes from Tele2 including: a certificate for 1,500 rubles for the purchase of a smartphone or 10 gigabytes of mobile internet.

Over the 3 weeks of the campaign, customers from 11 regions of Russia brought 1217 old mobile gadgets for processing. In October 2020, Tele2 scaled the project up and set special boxes for e-waste in 579 brand stores in 60 regions of Russia. All the gadgets are then sent to the Ecopolis Corporation, which disposes e-waste. Phones are then processed into different fractions. The project manager claimed "85-95% of recycled materials will return to production and not a single part will end up in landfill."

The team first got the idea for the project by a team of the marketing department in 2019. The first version of the project was deployed in 11 regions of Russia, to see how relevant the topic of e-waste and processing phones was in Russia. The first version went well and so Pereplavka was created and the project was scaled up to the entirety of the country. Only phones from the company's electrical devices were accepted to link Tele2 with the sustainability project.

Tele2 raised awareness regarding e-waste in Russia.
