= Mobile TeleSystems =

Russian mobile network operator

Mobile TeleSystems PJSC (MTS)
- Native name: ПАО «Мобильные ТелеСистемы» (МТС)
- Type: Public (ПAO)
- Traded as: MCX: MTSS; NYSE: MBT (until 2022)
- Industry: Telecommunications
- Predecessor: Moscow City Telephone Network
- Founded: October 8, 1993; 33 years ago
- Headquarters: Moscow, Russia
- Area served: Russia, Belarus
- Key people: Vyacheslav Nikolaev (chairman & president); Inessa Galaktionova (CEO)
- Products: cellular network, local telephone service, broadband, mobile television, cable television, satellite television, digital television
- Revenue: ₽ 180 billion (Q3 2024)
- Operating income: ₽ 33 billion (Q3 2024)
- Net income: ₽ 61 billion (Q3 2024)
- Total assets: ₽ 1,426 billion (Q3 2024)
- Number of employees: 60,000+ (2021)
- Parent: Sistema
- Subsidiaries: MTS Bank
- Website: www.mts.ru (Russia) www.mts.by (Belarus)

MTS, also known as Mobile TeleSystems (Russian: МТС «Мобильные ТелеСистемы»), is the largest telecommunications company and mobile network operator in Russia and Belarus, headquartered in Moscow, operating on GSM, UMTS, LTE and 5G standards. Apart from cellular network, the company also offers local telephone service, broadband, mobile television, cable television, satellite television and digital television.

As of Q3 2024, the company serves over 87.6 million subscribers in Russia (81.9 million) and Belarus (5.7 million). MTS had previously operated in Uzbekistan until 2012, Turkmenistan until 2017, Ukraine until 2015 and Armenia until 2024.

== MTS Russia ==
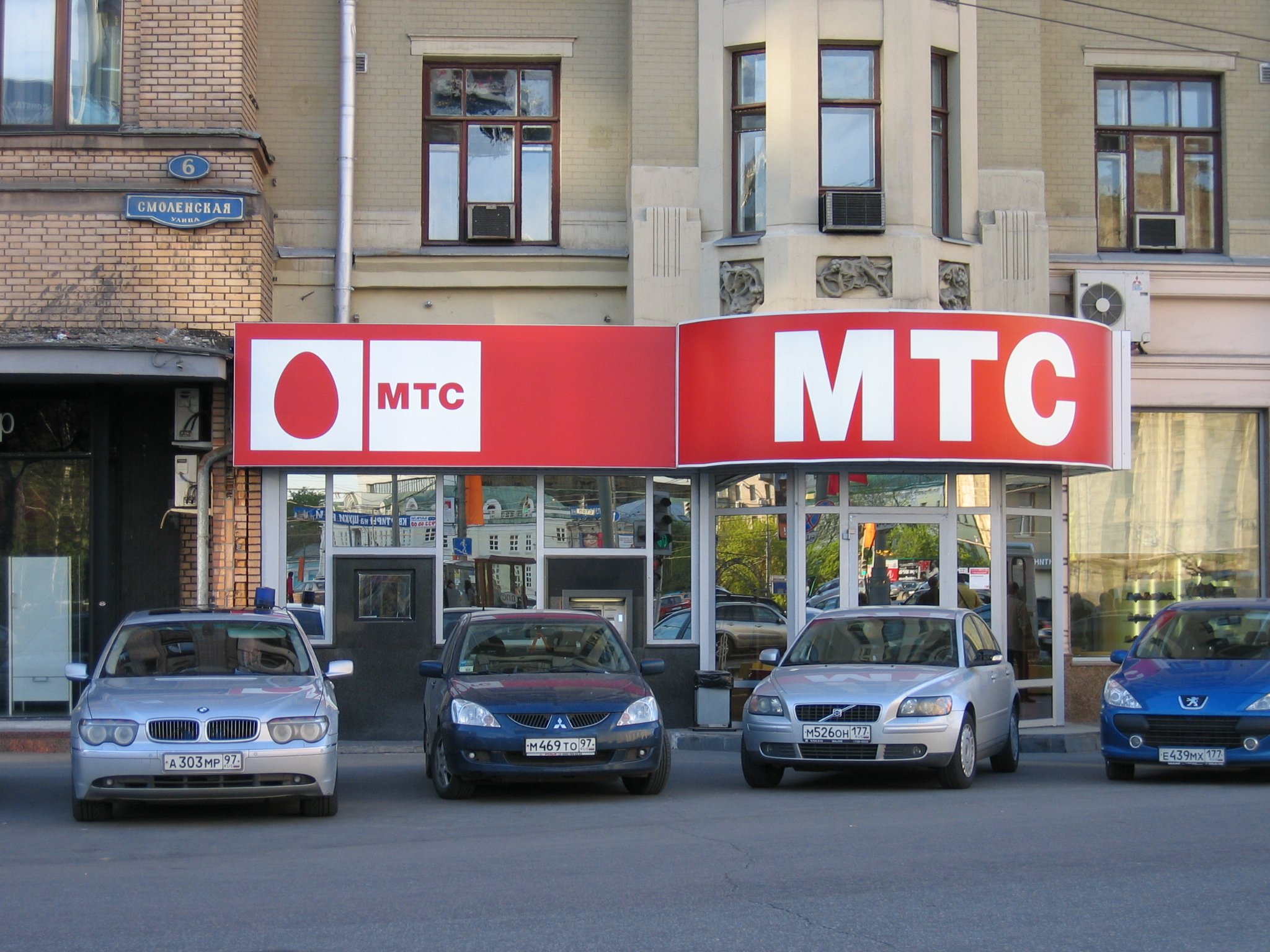
An MTS store in Moscow in 2007

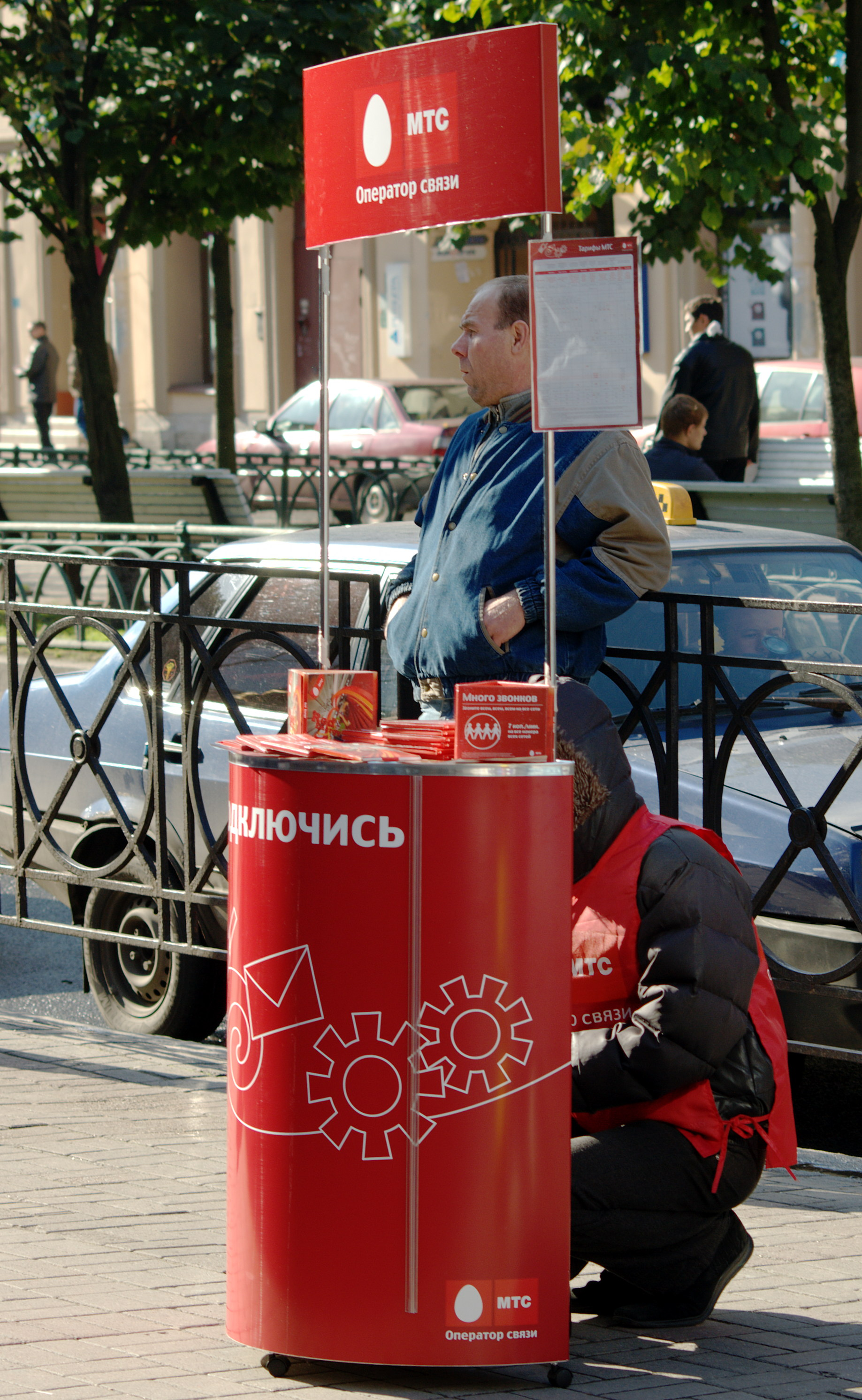
An MTS sales point outside a Chernyshevskaya metro station in 2009

In 1994, a joint venture of Moscow City Telephone Network, T-Mobile and Siemens, which later MTS GSM (Mobile TeleSystems) became part of Mobile TeleSystems (MTS), offered Russia's MTS GSM first mobile phone service "Mobile Telecommunications" (Russian: Мобильные ТелеСвязи) for the public in Moscow. In the same year in June, VimpelCom also started Beeline mobile phone service. MTS, having started Mobile TeleSystems in the Moscow license zone in 1994, received licenses in 1997 for further areas and began expansion across Russia, later entering other countries of the CIS.

In 2009, MTS acquired several independent mobile retail chains, creating MTS monobrand retail network of 3300 stores — the second largest retail network in Russia. Also in 2009 MTS started marketing MTS-branded mobile handsets. In 2010, MTS became the 5th best selling handset brand in Russia, after Nokia, Samsung, LG and Sony Ericsson.

In 2010, MTS announced the acquisition of 62% of Comstar's stock, the largest Russian fixed internet and cable TV provider, serving 7.5 million households. Comstar products were rebranded to MTS in 2010, forming the largest Russian mobile and fixed telecommunications brand. Until this purchase, MTS was presented at the fixed telephony market through its subsidiary Moscow City Telephone Network (MGTS).

In November 2013, the company launched the "Home Phone MTS" in Ryazan, Oryol, Kirov, Krasnodar, Rostov-on-Don, and Yekaterinburg. The subscription fee for the wired telephone is 100 rubles. Per month, it includes unlimited calls to numbers of local fixed-line operators. The cost of calls to mobile numbers ranges from 1.1 rubles per minute, depending on the region. Before that, in several cities, such services are also provided by Comstar, a subsidiary of MTS.

During 2012–2013, MTS deployed FTTB network in nearly twenty new cities of the Far East, Siberia, Central, Volga and Ural federal districts. In 2012, MTS launched in cities where the DTV signal standard is DVB-C, and in December 2013, launched a project to provide fixed telephony services to the mass market in the regions.

In 2013, Interregional TransitTelekom won a tender held by MTS to provide IPX services, and became one of the service providers for the company in the international telecommunications market. In November 2013, MTS began offering their Russian customers LTE roaming service, after such agreement were signed first with South Korean operator SK Telecom, and then with Saudi Arabia and Great Britain. Along with the construction of the fixed network, the company launched the DVB-C digital television standard in Ulan-Ude, Blagoveshchensk, Ussuriisk and Nakhodka. In November 2013, MTS completely switched to digital TV by connecting new subscribers, ending the connection to analogue television.

In March 2019, MTS launched an interactive media platform for cyber athletes and gamers called WASD.TV, and a mechanism for selecting players from the Gambit league to professional e-sports teams.

On 17 September 2019, it was revealed that a storage device containing 1.7 terabytes of information related to MTS was exposed to the public internet in a data leak.

From 2019 onwards, MTS has worked on building out its 5G networks in cooperation with Huawei as well as Ericsson and Nokia. In 2021, MTS and Huawei launched 5G networks at 14 pilot sites throughout Moscow, while MTS and Ericsson opened a 5G hub in Saint Petersburg.

In 2022, the company's revenue amounted to 392 billion rubles.

In January 2024, MTS, which previously owned a minority stake, increased its stake to 80.58% in the capital of the Urent scooter rental service, which provides services in more than a hundred cities in Russia.

=== Branding ===
In May 2006, MTS changed its logo as part of a rebranding campaign performed by its parent company, AFK Sistema PAO. The logo now has two red squares next to each other. The left one, common in form (but not colour) to all AFK Sistema PAO's telecom subsidiaries, contains a white egg which symbolises simplicity and genius, while the right square bears the name of the company: МТС (MTS). In 2010, MTS announced acquisition of Sistema Telecom, the owners of the MTS "egg" logo, for $380 million, thus becoming the sole owner of the logo.

In 2008, the MTS brand was included in the Top 100 World's Most Powerful Brands list by Financial Times/Millward Brown ranking, becoming the most valuable Russian brand. According to this ranking, in 2010, the MTS brand was the 72nd most valuable brand worldwide with a brand value of $9.7 billion. In 2010, MTS also became the most valuable Russian brand according to the Interbrand ranking.

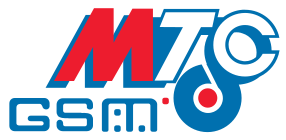
MTS logo 1993–2002

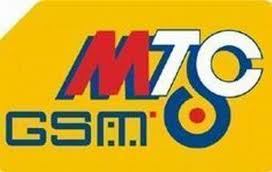
MTS logo 2002–2006

MTS logo 2006–2010

MTS logo 2010–2019

MTS logo 2019–2023

MTS logo in the Latin alphabet

=== Operations ===
As of March 2025, MTS in Russia operates on GSM, UMTS, LTE, NB-IoT and 5G NR standards.

Frequencies used on the MTS Russia Network
Frequency	Band number	Protocol	Class	Coverage across 89 federal subjects (As of March 2025)
900 MHz	8	GSM	2G	Country-wide; No service in: Crimea, Sevastopol, Luhansk, Donetsk, Zaporozhye, Kherson
1800 MHz	3	GSM	2G	Country-wide; No service in: Crimea, Sevastopol, Luhansk, Donetsk, Zaporozhye, Kherson
900 MHz	8	UMTS	3G	Country-wide; No service in: Saint Petersburg, Leningrad Oblast, Moscow, Moscow Oblast, Crimea, Sevastopol, Luhansk, Donetsk, Zaporozhye, Kherson and further 203 cities across 41 subjects
2100 MHz	1	UMTS	3G	Country-wide; No service in: Saint Petersburg, Leningrad Oblast, Moscow, Moscow Oblast, Crimea, Sevastopol, Luhansk, Donetsk, Zaporozhye, Kherson and further 203 cities across 41 subjects
800 MHz	20	LTE, VoLTE	4G	Country-wide; No service in: Crimea, Sevastopol, Luhansk, Donetsk, Zaporozhye, Kherson
900 MHz	8	LTE, VoLTE	4G	Country-wide; No service in: Crimea, Sevastopol, Luhansk, Donetsk, Zaporozhye, Kherson
1800 MHz	3	LTE, VoLTE	4G	Country-wide; No service in: Crimea, Sevastopol, Luhansk, Donetsk, Zaporozhye, Kherson
2100 MHz	1	LTE, VoLTE	4G	Country-wide; No service in: Crimea, Sevastopol, Luhansk, Donetsk, Zaporozhye, Kherson
2600 MHz	7	LTE, VoLTE	4G	Country-wide; No service in: Crimea, Sevastopol, Luhansk, Donetsk, Zaporozhye, Kherson
800 MHz	n20	NB-IoT	5G	Country-wide; No service in: Crimea, Sevastopol, Luhansk, Donetsk, Zaporozhye, Kherson
900 MHz	n8	NB-IoT	5G	Country-wide; No service in: Crimea, Sevastopol, Luhansk, Donetsk, Zaporozhye, Kherson
1800 MHz	n3	NB-IoT	5G	Country-wide; No service in: Crimea, Sevastopol, Luhansk, Donetsk, Zaporozhye, Kherson
2100 MHz	n1	5G NR	5G	Moscow, Saint Petersburg, Novosibirsk and 13+ cities (as of Sep 2026)
2600 MHz	n7	5G NR	5G	Moscow, Saint Petersburg, Novosibirsk and 13+ cities (as of Sep 2026)
4900 MHz	n79	5G NR	5G	Moscow, Saint Petersburg, Novosibirsk and 13+ cities (as of Sep 2026)

== MTS Belarus ==
In Belarus, the MTS trademark renders services of cellular communication and data transmission of "Mobile TeleSystems JLLC (MTS)" (Belarusian: СТАА «Мабільныя ТэлеСістэмы» (МТС)). The founders of this company are Beltelecom (51% of shares) and Russian MTS "Mobile TeleSystems OJSC" (49% of shares).

MTS Belarus began operations on 27 June 2002, and became the second Belarusian mobile operator after A1 Belarus. In the first four days, 2,300 subscribers were connected.

MTS Belarus subscriber numbers have the following formats:

- +375 29 2 xx xx xx, +375 29 5 xx xx xx, +375 29 7 xx xx xx, +375 29 8 xx xx xx
- +375 33 3 xx xx xx, +375 33 6 xx xx xx, +375 33 9 xx xx xx

With the introduction of the mobile number portability in Belarus, subscriber numbers may also have the following formats: +375 25 xxx xx xx, +375 29 xxx xx xx, +375 44 xxx xx xx.

== Former operations ==
=== MTS Uzbekistan ===
Uzdunrobita was the largest mobile phone operator in Uzbekistan in the 1990s and 2000s. Uzdunrobita was founded in 1991, as a joint venture between a group of American investors, the International Communications Group, with a 45% stake; and the government of what was then the Uzbek Soviet Socialist Republic, with a 55% stake. When Uzbekistan declared independence several weeks later, the registration of the joint venture was shifted from Moscow to Tashkent, with the government stake taken over by the independent Uzbek government.

The company first turned a profit in 1993. By 1996, it had $50 million in annual revenues, 7,000 subscribers, and employed 224 staff. Gulnora Karimova gained control of the firm in the late 1990s or early 2000s, and by 2005 it was 74% owned by Russia's MTS, which paid $121 million for the stake. In 2006 it was reported to have 250,000 subscribers, ahead of Daewoo Unitel, which had 100,000, and some much smaller firms.

The company launched an LTE network on 2.6 GHz in July 2010, and received a license to expand it on 700 MHz in December 2010.

The brand UMC in Uzbekistan existed until mid-2007, when a major rebranding campaign took place, transforming UMC into MTS. In July 2012, authorities in Uzbekistan announced the suspension of the operating license of MTS's subsidiary Uzdunrobita. Officials argued that MTS-Uzbekistan has been responsible for a series of technical violations, and its operations have been suspended beginning on the evening of 17 July. According to the MTS, the suspension could affect millions of Uzbek mobile phone users. An MTS statement said the firm has some 10 million clients among Uzbekistan's population of 28 million.

In August 2012, the government of Uzbekistan revoked the company's operating license and arrested several of its top management, citing repeated regulatory violations. MTS protested the action as a "shakedown", but was unable to oppose it effectively, and moved to write down its stake. After the case in September 2012, the company's assets were seized, and some of its executives sentenced to prison terms.

The Russian Foreign Ministry reacted and declared that Russia was concerned about the situation with Mobile TeleSystems' Uzbekistan subsidiary Uzdunrobita, after Uzbek authorities suspended the mobile operator's license and put a senior official into custody. The dispute, which analysts fear may lead to MTS exiting the market, erupted at the beginning of 2012 when Uzbek authorities launched a nearly $1.3 million back-tax claim against MTS. MTS said in an emailed statement that the actions of the Uzbek authorities may be interpreted as "baseless attacks on the business of the Russian investor". However, in 2019, The United States Department of Justice charged the firm for bribery to secure contracts in Uzbekistan. MTS agreed to pay a penalty of $850 million.

=== MTS Turkmenistan ===
On 25 July 2012, MTS signed an agreement with the Turkmentelecom enterprise of the Ministry of Communications of Turkmenistan, which says that MTS Turkmenistan will, every month, pay to Turkmentelecom 30% of its net profit derived from operations in Turkmenistan. This agreement is for a term of five years and may be extended for an additional five years, subject to certain conditions. The company has also been granted GSM and 3G licenses for a three-year term.

MTS Turkmenistan in September 2017 faced the potential termination of its permit to use the dedicated radio frequency spectrum and other required resources. The provision of communication services to subscribers in Turkmenistan was suspended due to a network shutdown and the absence of a successor. As of 2016, MTS-Turkmenistan had reached its peak with 1.7 million subscribers.

=== MTS India ===
In 2008, Sistema formed a 74:26 joint venture with India's Shyam Group to form Sistema Shyam Teleservices (SSTL), and acquired a pan-India licence to provide CDMA services in the country. In March 2009, SSTL launched the MTS India brand in the state of Tamil Nadu, followed by neighbouring states Kerala and West Bengal in April and May, respectively. Following the cancellation of its licences by the Supreme Court of India, MTS is present in 9 circles out of 22 telecom circles of India. MTS India was acquired by Reliance Communications (RCom) on 14 January 2016 in an all-stock deal, in which SSTL received a 10% share in RCom. SSTL was merged into RCom on 31 October 2017.

=== MTS Ukraine ===
On 31 October 2008, Vodafone announced a partnership deal with MTS, whereby Vodafone services will be available to MTS subscribers, and both companies have noted the potential for more efficient purchasing, starting with operations in Ukraine.

In October 2015, Mobile TeleSystems and Vodafone expanded their strategic partnership; this resulted in the rebranding of MTS Ukraine to Vodafone Ukraine. MTS sold its Ukraine operations in 2019.

=== MTS Armenia ===
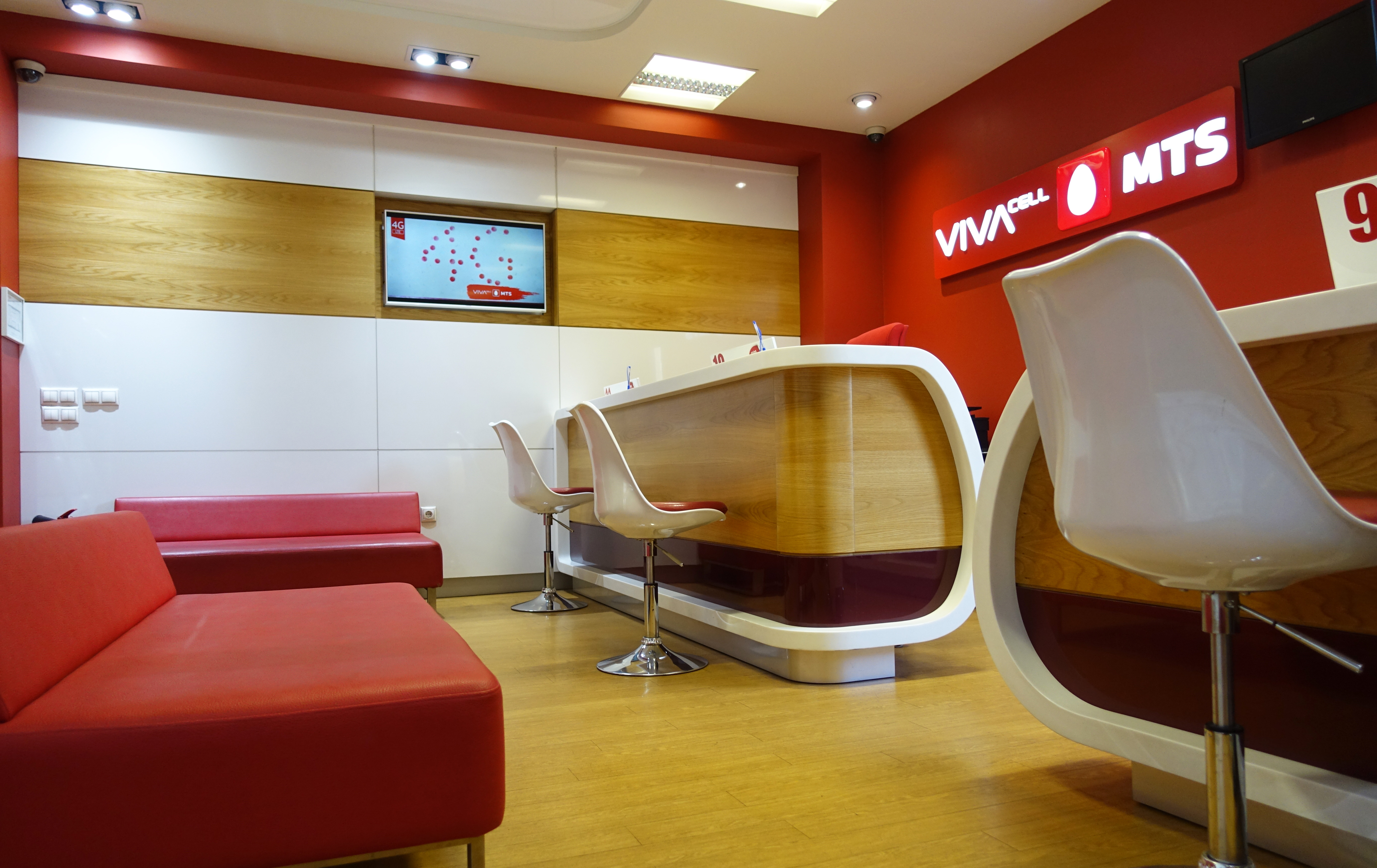
A VivaCell-MTS store in Yerevan, Armenia in 2018

In Armenia, services under the MTS brand were provided by K-Telecom CJSC, under the brand names VivaCell-MTS (from 2007 to 2019) and Viva-MTS (from 2019 to 2024), 80% of which were owned by Mobile TeleSystems. The number of subscribers of VivaCell-MTS in Armenia by 31 March 2011, was 2.55 million. By May 2011, VivaCell-MTS occupied more than 60% of the mobile market in Armenia, and by December 2017, VivaCell-MTS had 2.1 million subscribers.

In January 2024, it was announced that MTS had sold its Armenian unit to Fedilco Group, selling 100% of its shares.

== See also ==
- List of mobile network operators in Europe
- Mobile phone industry in Russia
- Telecommunications in Russia
