= HMS =

HMS or hms may refer to:

== Education ==
- Habib Medical School, of the Islamic University in Uganda
- Hartley–Melvin–Sanborn Community School District of Iowa, United States
- Harvard Medical School of Harvard University
- Heidelberg Middle School, a former American school in Heidelberg, Germany
- Hongwanji Mission School, in Hawaii, United States
- Horley Methodist School, Teluk Intan, in Malaysia

== Medicine and science ==
- Hartford Medical Society, an American professional association based in Hartford, Connecticut
- Health management system
- Hexose monophosphate shunt, an alternative name for the pentose phosphate pathway
- Highly migratory species, a classification of fish
- Hypermobility spectrum disorder, formerly hypermobility syndrome or HMS
- HMS, a brand name of medrysone

== Technology ==
- Huawei Mobile Services, proprietary apps and services from Huawei bundled with Android devices
- HMS Networks, a company in the field of industrial communications
- HMS Group, Russian industrial and engineering holding
- Heavy melting steel
- Helmet mounted sight
- Hybrid Management Sub-Layer, in networking
- Munter hitch (German: Halbmastwurfsicherung), a type of knot
- Handheld, Manpack, Small Form Factor, in the US Joint Tactical Radio System

== Transport ==
- Her or His Majesty's Ship, a ship prefix
- Helmsdale railway station, Scotland, station code
- Helsinki Motor Show, annual national Finnish car show.
- Hendrick Motorsports, a NASCAR racing team

== Society ==
- Hellenic Mathematical Society, a Greek learned society
- Historical Maritime Society, UK

== Other uses ==
- Hind Mazdoor Sabha, an Indian trade union
- HMS Management, family office of Josh Harris
- Hours, minutes, seconds, sometimes "h:m:s", dividing hours into smaller units

== See also ==
- HSM (disambiguation)
