= List of strategic organizations of Russia =

The list of strategic organizations of Russia was developed by the Government Commission on Sustainable Development of the Russian Economy in December 2008.

Organizations included in the list are considered priority recipients of government support in the event of an economic crisis. The list is not exhaustive and may be revised by a decision of the Commission.

Many of the companies listed are subject to sanctions following the 2022 Russian invasion of Ukraine.

== List ==
In approving the list December 25, 2008 have been included in 295 enterprises. Commission meeting May 12, 2009 list was supplemented by 9 enterprises. The updated list contains 197 positions. Sequence numbers are in accordance with the document on the website of the Ministry.

- Explanations:

JSC, PJSC:Joint-stock company
CJSC, ZAO:Closed joint-stock company
OJSC:Open joint-stock company
OOO:private limited company
LLC:Limited liability company
FSUE:Unitary enterprise

1. JSC Rusal (АО «Русский Алюминий»)
2. Akkond JSC (АО «Акконд»)
3. Bashkir Chemistry JSC (АО «Башкирская химия»)
4. JSC BTK Group (АО «БТК групп»)
5. JSC HMS Group (АО «Группа ГМС» )
6. JSC Eurocement Group (АО «Евроцемент групп»)
7. JSC Yenisei TGC (TGC-13) (АО «Енисейская ТГК (ТГК-13)»)
8. JSC Zarubezhneft (АО «Зарубежнефть»)
9. JSC Inteco (АО «Интеко»)
10. JSC Concern Morinformsystem-Agat (АО «Концерн «Моринформсистема-Агат»)
11. JSC Concern Oceanpribor (АО «Концерн «Океанприбор»)
12. Almaz-Antey Concern OJSC (АО «Концерн ВКО «Алмаз-Антей»)
13. JSC Transstroy Corporation (АО «Корпорация Трансстрой»)
14. Crocus Group JSC (АО «Крокус»)
15. Sheremetyevo International Airport JSC (АО «Международный аэропорт Шереметьево»)
16. JSC EuroChem (АО «Минерально-химическая компания «Еврохим»)
17. JSC Mondi Syktyvkarsky LPK (АО «Монди Сыктывкарский ЛПК»)
18. JSC Nizhny Novgorod Oil and Fat Plant (АО «Нижегородский масложировой комбинат»)
19. JSC Oil Company RussNeft (АО «НК «РуссНефть»)
20. JSC NPK Uralvagonzavod (АО «НПК «Уралвагонзавод»)
21. United Metallurgical Company JSC (АО «Объединенная металлургическая компания»)
22. JSC United Shipbuilding Corporation (АО «ОСК»)
23. JSC URALCHEM OXC (АО «ОХК «УРАЛХИМ»)
24. JSC Poultry Farm North (АО «Птицефабрика Северная»)
25. JSC Rosgeo (АО «Росгео»)
26. JSC Ruzaevsky Chemical Engineering Plant (АО «Рузаевский завод химического машиностроения» )
27. JSC Sayanskkhimplast (АО «Саянскхимпласт»)
28. JSC Siberian Agrarian Group (АО «Сибирская Аграрная Группа»)
29. JSC SIBEKO (АО «СИБЭКО»)
30. JSC Sinara - Transport Machines (АО «Синара - транспортные машины»)
31. JSC SU-155 (АО «СУ-155»)
32. JSC Management Company EFKO (АО «Управляющая компания «ЭФКО»)
33. JSC HC Metalloinvest (АО «ХК «Металлоинвест»)
34. JSC Energoprom Management (АО «Энергопром Менеджмент»)
35. Joint-Stock Company Agrocomplex (АО фирма «Агрокомплекс»)
36. JSC HC SDS-Mash (АО ХК «СДС-Маш»)
37. SC Rosatom (ГК «Росатом»)
38. GC Rostec (ГК «Ростехнологии»)
39. CJSC White Bird (ЗАО «Белая птица» )
40. ZAO WAD (ЗАО «ВАД»)
41. CJSC International Paper (ЗАО «Интернешнл Пейпер»)
42. Joint-Stock Company United Wagon Company (ЗАО «Объединенная Вагонная компания»)
43. ZAO Prioskolie (ЗАО «Приосколье»)
44. CJSC Renault Russia (ЗАО «РЕНО РОССИЯ»)
45. ZAO Russian Copper Company (ЗАО «Русская медная компания»)
46. CJSC Stavropol Broiler (ЗАО «Ставропольский бройлер»)
47. CJSC Tander (ЗАО «Тандер»)
48. ZAO TD Tallinn (ЗАО «ТД Талина»)
49. ZAO Transmashholding (ЗАО «Трансмашхолдинг»)
50. CJSC UK Petropavlovsk (ЗАО «УК «Петропавловск»)
51. ZAO Uralbroyler (ЗАО «Уралбройлер»)
52. ZAO AVK Exima (ЗАО АВК «Эксима»)
53. JSC Tverskoy Vagonostroitelniy Zavod (ОАО "Тверской вагоностроительный завод» )
54. OJSC Ural Airlines (ОАО «Авиакомпания «Уральские авиалинии»)
55. JSC AvtoVAZ (ОАО «АвтоВАЗ» )
56. JSC Transneft (ОАО «АК «Транснефть»)
57. JSC Acron (ОАО «Акрон»)
58. Joint Stock Company Kurgan Society of Medical Preparations and Products Synthesis (ОАО «Акционерное Курганское общество медицинских препаратов и изделий «Синтез»)
59. OJSC Arkhangelsk Pulp and Paper Mill (ОАО «Архангельский ЦБК»)
60. OJSC Biosintez (ОАО «Биосинтез»)
61. JSC Velikoluksky meat-packing plant (ОАО «Великолукский мясокомбинат»)
62. JSC Volgogradneftemash (ОАО «Волгограднефтемаш»)
63. JSC HaloPolymer (ОАО «ГалоПолимер»)
64. JSC Generation Company (ОАО «Генерирующая компания» )
65. OJSC Ilim Group (ОАО «Группа «Илим»)
66. OJSC Cherkizovo Group (ОАО «Группа Черкизово»)
67. OJSC Dallesprom (ОАО «Дальлеспром»)
68. JSC Degtyarev plant (ОАО «Завод им. В.А. Дегтярева»)
69. OJSC Kamensk-Uralsky Metallurgical Works (ОАО «Каменск-Уральский металлургический завод»)
70. OJSC Company Glavmosstroy (ОАО «Компания «Главмосстрой»)
71. Kondopoga OJSC (ОАО «Кондопога»)
72. JSC Concern MPO-Gidropribor (ОАО «Концерн «МПО-Гидроприбор»)
73. OJSC Concern Granit-Electron (ОАО «Концернт «Гранит-Электрон»)
74. OJSC Tactical Missiles Corporation (ОАО «Корпорация «Тактическое ракетное вооружение»)
75. OJSC Kuzbassenergo (ОАО «Кузбассэнерго»)
76. OJSC Kuibyshevazot (ОАО «Куйбышевазот»)
77. OJSC Magnitogorsk Iron and Steel Works (ОАО «Магнитогорский металлургический комбинат»)
78. OJSC Makfa (ОАО «Макфа»)
79. OJSC Pulkovo Airport (ОАО «Международный аэропорт «Пулково»)
80. Mechel OAO (ОАО «Мечел»)
81. OAO NGK Slavneft (ОАО «НГК «Славнефть»)
82. OAO Novatek (ОАО «НОВАТЭК»)
83. Joint-Stock Company United Rocket and Space Corporation (ОАО «Объединенная ракетно-космическая корпорация» )
84. OJSC Polymetal Management Company (ОАО «Полиметалл УК»)
85. OJSC Progress Rocket Space Centre (ОАО «Прогресс»)
86. OJSC Protek (ОАО «Протек» )
87. JSC Russian Railways (ОАО «Российские железные дороги»)
88. OJSC Sedmoi Kontinent (ОАО «Седьмой континент»)
89. OJSC Siberian Cement (ОАО «Сибирский цемент»)
90. OJSC Power Machines (ОАО «Силовые машины» )
91. JSC SO UES (ОАО «СО ЕЭС»)
92. OJSC Surgutneftegas (ОАО «Сургутнефтегаз»)
93. PSC TAIF (ОАО «ТАИФ»)
94. OJSC TGC-2 (ОАО «ТГК-2»)
95. OJSC TogliattiAzot (ОАО «Тольяттиазот»)
96. OJSC Kuzbassrazrezugol (ОАО «Угольная компания «Кузбассразрезуголь»)
97. OJSC Management Company of the EPK (ОАО «УК ЕПК»)
98. OJSC Ufaneftekhim (ОАО «Уфанефтехим»)
99. OJSC Fortum (ОАО «Фортум»)
100. JSC PhosAgro (ОАО «ФосАгро»)
101. OJSC HC SDS-Ugol (ОАО «ХК СДС-Уголь» )
102. OJSC Chelyabinsk Tube Rolling Plant (ОАО «Челябинский трубопрокатный завод»)
103. JSC Chelyabinsk Electrometallurgical Combine (ОАО «Челябинский электрометаллургический комбинат»)
104. Electrozavod OJSC (ОАО «Электрозавод»)
105. OJSC Sistema (ОАО АФК «Система» (МТС))
106. OJSC SC Rostselmash (ОАО ГК «Ростсельмаш»)
107. OAO NK Rosneft (ОАО НК «Роснефть»)
108. LLC Solar Products (ООО ««Солнечные продукты» )
109. LLC Miratorg (ООО «Агропромышленный холдинг «Мираторг»)
110. LLC Agrofirma TRIO (ООО «Агрофирма «ТРИО»)
111. LLC Auchan (ООО «Ашан»)
112. LLC Bashkir Generation Company (ООО «Башкирская генерирующая компания»)
113. Wimm-Bill-Dann Foods LLC (ООО «Вимм-Билль-Данн Продукты Питания»)
114. LLC GC Agro-Belogorye (ООО «ГК «Агро-Белогорье»)
115. LLC Magnezit Group (ООО «Группа «Магнезит»)
116. LLC Group of companies Dominant (ООО «Группа компаний «Доминант»)
117. LLC Group of companies Rusagro (ООО «Группа компаний «Русагро»)
118. Danone-Industry LLC (ООО «Данон-Индустрия»)
119. OOO Evraz Holding (ООО «Евраз Холдинг»)
120. Integra Management LLC (ООО «Интегра Менеджмент»)
121. OOO Concern Tractor Plants (ООО «ККУ «Концерн «Тракторные заводы»)
122. Lenta LLC (ООО «Лента»)
123. Domodedovo International Airport LLC (ООО «Международный аэропорт Домодедово»)
124. Metro Cash & Carry LLC (ООО «Метро кэш энд Керри»)
125. LLC Mordovian Agro-Industrial Association (ООО «Мордовское агропромышленное объединение»)
126. LLC Morton-RSO (ООО «Мортон-РСО»)
127. OOO Nikokhim (ООО «Никохим»)
128. O'KEY LLC (ООО «О’КЕЙ»)
129. OOO Orimi (ООО «Орими»)
130. Prodimex-Holding LLC (ООО «Продимекс-холдинг»)
131. OOO Prodo Management (ООО «Продо Менеджмент» )
132. OOO Russian Fishery Company (ООО «Русская рыбопромышленная компания»)
133. OOO Russian Machines (ООО «Русские машины»)
134. Stroygazconsulting LLC (ООО «Стройгазконсалтинг»)
135. LLC Ural Mining and Metallurgical Company (ООО «УГМК-Холдинг» )
136. LLC UK Industrial-Metallurgical Holding (ООО «УК «Промышленно-металлургический холдинг»)
137. LLC UK Sodruzhestvo (ООО «УК Содружество»)
138. OOO EkoNivaAgro (ООО «ЭкоНиваАгро»)
139. LLC Yurga Machine-Building Plant (ООО «Юргинский машзавод»)
140. PJSC GEOTECH Seismic exploration (ПАО "ГЕОТЕК Сейсморазведка")
141. PJSC UTair Aviation (ПАО «Авиакомпания «ЮТэйр»)
142. PJSC Siberia Airlines (ПАО «Авиакомпания Сибирь»)
143. PJSC Alrosa (ПАО «Алроса»)
144. PJSC ANC Bashneft (ПАО «АНК «Башнефть»)
145. PJSC Pharmacy Chain 36.6 (ПАО «Аптечная сеть 36,6»)
146. PJSC Aeroflot - Russian Airlines (ПАО «Аэрофлот - российские авиалинии»)
147. PJSC Volgomost (ПАО «Волгомост»)
148. PJSC Vympelcom (ПАО «Вымпелком»)
149. PJSC Gazprom (ПАО «Газпром»)
150. PJSC MMC Norilsk Nickel (ПАО «ГМК «Норильский никель»)
151. PJSC LSR Group (ПАО «Группа «ЛСР»)
152. PJSC PIK Group (ПАО «Группа компаний «ПИК»)
153. PJSC Dixy Group (ПАО «Дикси Групп»)
154. PJSC Inter RAO (ПАО «Интер РАО»)
155. PJSC Irkutskenergo (ПАО «Иркутскэнерго»)
156. PJSC KamAZ (ПАО «КамАЗ»)
157. PJSC Quadra-Power Generation (ПАО «Квадра»)
158. PJSC Company M.video (ПАО «Компания «М.видео»)
159. PJSC Limak (ПАО «Лимак»)
160. PJSC LUKOIL (ПАО «ЛУКОЙЛ»)
161. PJSC MegaFon (ПАО «Мегафон»)
162. PJSC Mostotrest (ПАО «Мостотрест»)
163. PJSC Motovilikha Plants (ПАО «Мотовилихинские заводы» )
164. PJSC Nizhnekamskneftekhim (ПАО «Нижнекамскнефтехим»)
165. PJSC Nizhnekamskshina (ПАО «Нижнекамскшина» )
166. PJSC Novolipetsk Iron & Steel Works (ПАО «Новолипецкий металлургический комбинат»)
167. Joint-Stock Company United Machine-Building Plants (ПАО «Объединенные машиностроительные заводы» )
168. PJSC Polyus Gold (ПАО «Полюс-Золото»)
169. PJSC Rosseti (ПАО «Россети»)
170. PJSC Rostelecom (ПАО «Ростелеком»)
171. PJSC RusHydro (ПАО «РусГидро»)
172. PJSC Severstal (ПАО «Северсталь» )
173. PJSC Sibur Holding (ПАО «СИБУР Холдинг»)
174. PJSC Sovcomflot (ПАО «Совкомфлот»)
175. PJSC Sollers JSC (ПАО «Соллерс»)
176. PJSC SUEK (ПАО «СУЭК»)
177. PJSC T Plus (ПАО «Т плюс» )
178. PJSC Tatneft (ПАО «Татнефть им. В.Д. Шашина»)
179. PJSC TGC-14 (ПАО «ТГК-14»)
180. PJSC Pipe Metallurgical Company (ПАО «Трубная металлургическая компания»)
181. PJSC Uralkali (ПАО «Уралкалий»)
182. PJSC Pharmstandard (ПАО «Фармстандарт»)
183. PJSC FGC UES (ПАО «ФСК ЕЭС»)
184. PJSC Razgulay Group (ПАО Группа «Разгуляй»)
185. FGBU Kurchatov Institute (ФГБУ «Национальный исследовательсикй центр «Курчатовский институт»)
186. FSUE Goznak (ФГУП «Гознак»)
187. FSUE Khrunichev State Research and Production Space Center (ФГУП «Государственный космический научно-производственный центр им. М.В. Хруничева»)
188. FSUE Lavochkin (ФГУП «Научно-производственное объединение имени С.А. Лавочкина»)
189. FSUE Microgen (ФГУП «НПО Микроген» Минздрава России)
190. FSUE Academician Pilyugin Center (ФГУП «НПЦ автоматики и приборостроения им. Академика Н.А. Пилюгина»)
191. FSUE Russian Post (ФГУП «Почта России»)
192. FSUE Rosmorport (ФГУП «Росморпорт»)
193. FSUE Russian Television and Radio Broadcasting Network (ФГУП «Российская телевизионная и радиовещательная сеть»)
194. FSUE Center for the Operation of Ground-Based Space Infrastructure Facilities (ФГУП «Центр эксплуатации объектов наземной космической инфраструктуры»)
195. FSUE TsNIIMash (ФГУП «ЦНИИМаш»)
196. Branch Bashneft-Ufaneftekhim (филиал "Башнефть - Уфанефтехим")
197. X5 Retail Group N.V. (Х5 Retail Group N.V.)
