= Abkhazian apsar =

Currency of Abkhazia

Аԥсны аԥсар (Abkhaz); абхазский апсар (Russian)
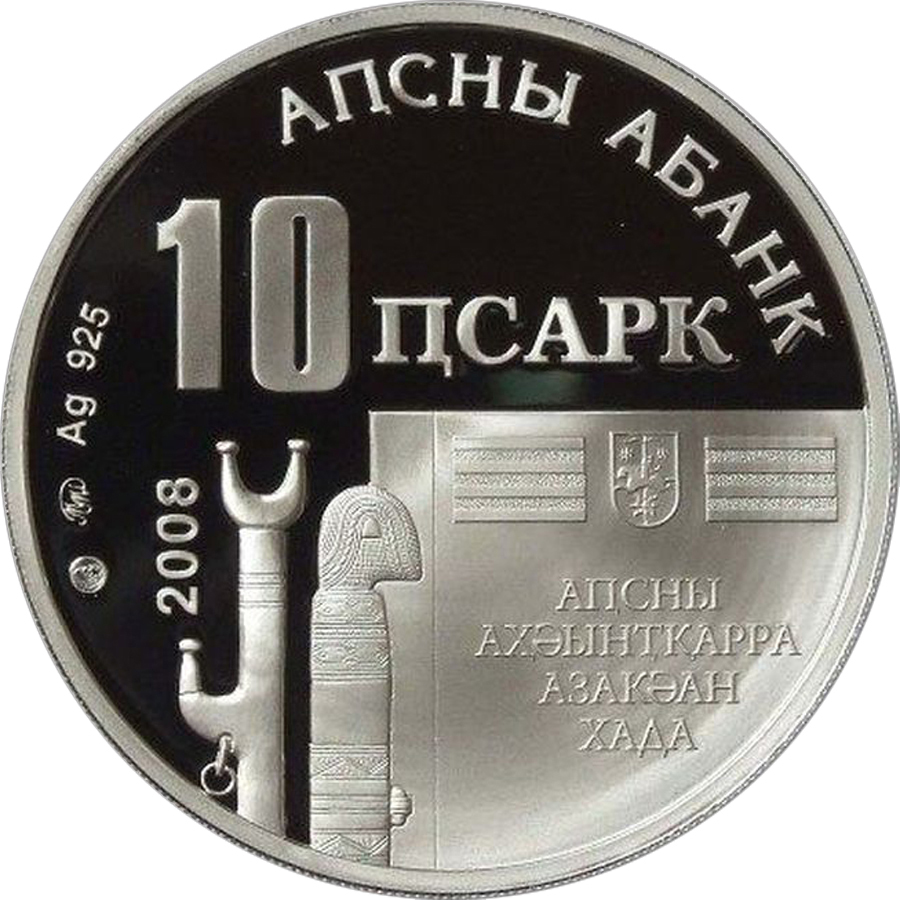
10 apsars (obverse)
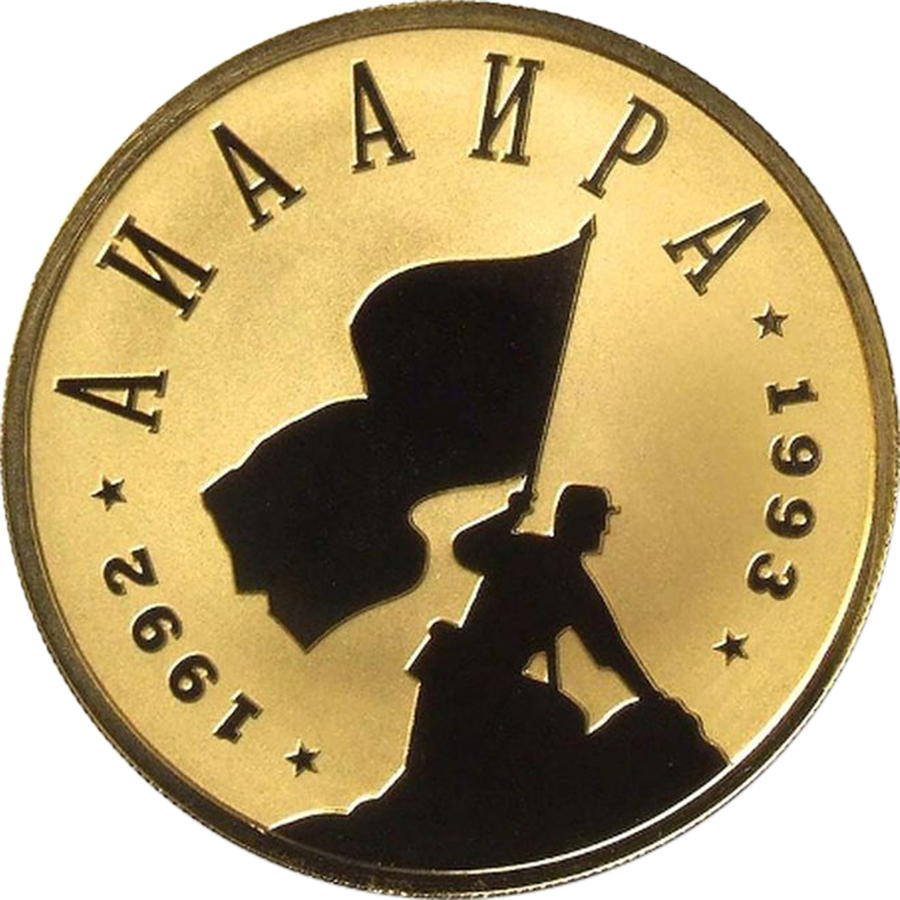
50 apsars (reverse)

ISO 4217
- Code: none

Units of account
- Plural: psark (ԥсарк)

Denominations
- Banknotes: 10, 25, 50, 100, 200, 500 apsark
- Coins: 1, 2, 3, 5, 10, 20, 25, 50, 100 apsark

Demographics
- User(s): Abkhazia (alongside Russian ruble)

Issuance
- Central bank: National Bank of the Republic of Abkhazia
- Website: www.nb-ra.org
- Printer: Goznak
- Mint: Moscow Mint
- Website: www.mmint.ru

Valuation
- Pegged with: аҧ 1 = ₽ 10

The apsar (Abkhaz: аԥсар, āpsār; symbol:) is a currency of Abkhazia. So far, coins in denominations of 1, 2, 3, 5, 10, 20, 25, 50, and 100 apsars and banknotes in denominations of 10, 25, 50, 100, 200 and 500 apsars have been issued. While the coins and banknotes are legal tender in the Republic of Abkhazia, their usage is limited, and they are mostly made for collectors. In Abkhazia, the Russian ruble is used in practice. The first apsar coins were introduced in 2008.

The name derives from the Apsars, a tribe mentioned in The Georgian Chronicles who inhabited the region in the Middle Ages and who are believed to be the ancestors of the Abkhaz people.

The Bank of Abkhazia is responsible for the apsar coins, and has so far issued two series: "Outstanding personalities of Abkhazia" (6 coins) and "The patriotic war of the Abkhaz nation 1992–1993" (2 coins). People who have appeared on coins include:

- Vladislav Ardzinba, 1st president of Abkhazia (1994–2005)
- Fazil Iskander, writer
- Dmitry Gulia, writer
- Samson Chanba, writer and statesman
- Bagrat Shinkuba, writer and politician
- Aleksandr Chachba, artist

10 and 100 apsar coins are made of silver; 25 and 50 apsar coins are made of gold. The number of coins produced is low: 2,000 silver coins are minted and 1,000 gold coins.

== Issues ==
=== 2008 commemorative coins of the 15th anniversary of the Abkhazian victory in the 1992–93 war ===
Vladislav Ardzinba and the Abkhazian state			
Designer: B. R. Japua, V. M. Erokhin		Mint: Moscow Mint	
Value: 10 apsars	Alloy: Ag 925	Quantity: 2,000	Quality: Proof-like
Issued: 26 September 2008	Diameter: 39.0 mm	Thickness: 3,30 ± 0,35 mm	Weight: 33,94 ± 0,31 g
Vladislav Ardzinba and the Abkhazian state			
Designers: B. R. Japua, V. M. Erokhin		Mint: Moscow Mint	
Value: 50 apsars	Alloy: Au 999	Quantity: 1,000	Quality: Proof-like
Issued: 26 September 2008	Diameter: 39.0 mm	Thickness: 1,7 ± 0,2 mm	Weight: 15,72 ± 0,15 g
Victory			
Designer: B. R. Japua, V. M. Erokhin		Mint: Moscow Mint	
Value: 10 apsars	Alloy: Ag 925, Au 999	Quantity: 2,000	Quality: Proof-like, Antiproof
Issued: 26 September 2008	Diameter: 39.0 mm	Thickness: 3,30 ± 0,35 mm	Weight: 33,94 ± 0,31 g
Victory			
Designers: B. R. Japua, V. M. Erokhin		Mint: Moscow Mint	
Value: 50 apsars	Alloy: Au 999	Quantity: 1,000	Quality: Proof-like, Antiproof
Issued: 26 September 2008	Diameter: 39.0 mm	Thickness: 1,7 ± 0,2 mm	Weight: 15,72 ± 0,15 g

=== 2009 ===
==== Commemorative coins of Abkhazian writers ====
(80th birthday of) Fazil Iskander			
Designer: B. R. Japua		Mint: Moscow Mint	
Value: 10 apsars	Alloy: Ag 925	Quantity: 2,000	Quality: Proof-like
Issued: 6 May 2009	Diameter: 39.0 mm	Thickness: 3,30 ± 0,35 mm	Weight: 33,94 ± 0,31 g
Dmitry Gulia			
Designers: T. D. Kaitan, V. M. Erokhin		Mint: Moscow Mint	
Value: 10 apsars	Alloy: Ag 925	Quantity: 1,000	Quality: Proof-like
Issued: 29 June 2009	Diameter: 39.0 mm	Thickness: 3,30 ± 0,35 mm	Weight: 33,94 ± 0,31 g
Samson Chanba			
Designers: B. R. Japua, V. M. Erokhin		Mint: Moscow Mint	
Value: 10 apsars	Alloy: Ag 925	Quantity: 1,000	Quality: Proof-like
Issued: 29 June 2009	Diameter: 39.0 mm	Thickness: 3,30 ± 0,35 mm	Weight: 33,94 ± 0,31 g
Bagrat Shinkuba			
Designers: R. T. Gablia, V. M. Erokhin		Mint: Moscow Mint	
Value: 10 apsars	Alloy: Ag 925	Quantity: 1,000	Quality: Proof-like
Issued: 29 June 2009	Diameter: 39.0 mm	Thickness: 3,30 ± 0,35 mm	Weight: 33,94 ± 0,31 g
Aleksandr Chachba			
Designers: B. R. Japua		Mint: Moscow Mint	
Value: 10 apsars	Alloy: Ag 925	Quantity: 1,000	Quality: Proof-like
Issued: 16 November 2009	Diameter: 39.0 mm	Thickness: 3,30 ± 0,35 mm	Weight: 33,94 ± 0,31 g

==== Commemorative Nart coin ====
The Narts			
Designers: R. T. Gablia, V. M. Erokhin		Mint: Moscow Mint	
Value: 25 apsars	Alloy: Au 999	Quantity: 1,000	Quality: Uncirculated
Issued: 16 November 2009	Diameter: 22.6 mm	Thickness:	Weight:

=== 2010 ===
==== Commemorative Coins of 2010 Historic Monuments of Abkhazia ====
Bediysky Cathedral of St Mary			
Designers: Japua B.R		Mint: Moscow Mint	
Value: 10 apsars	Alloy:	Quantity:	Quality:
Issued: 6 December 2010	Diameter: 39.0 mm	Thickness: 2.0 mm	Weight: 33.94
Church of St. Simon the Canaanite			
Designers: Japua B.R		Mint: Moscow Mint	
Value: 10 apsars	Alloy:	Quantity:	Quality:
Issued: 6 December 2010	Diameter: 39.0 mm	Thickness: 3.3 mm	Weight: 33.94
Pitsundsky Cathedral of St. Andrew			
Designers: Japua B.R		Mint: Moscow Mint	
Value: 10 apsars	Alloy:	Quantity:	Quality:
Issued: 6 December 2010	Diameter: 39.0 mm	Thickness: 3.3 mm	Weight: 33.94
Mykusky Assumption Cathedral			
Designers: Japua B.R		Mint: Moscow Mint	
Value: 10 apsars	Alloy:	Quantity:	Quality:
Issued: 6 December 2010	Diameter: 39.0 mm	Thickness: 3.3 mm	Weight: 33.94
Lyhnensky Assumption Church			
Designers: Japua B.R		Mint: Moscow Mint	
Value: 10 apsars	Alloy:	Quantity:	Quality:
Issued: 6 December 2010	Diameter: 39.0 mm	Thickness: 3.3 mm	Weight: 33.94
Elyrsky Church of St. George			
Designers: Japua B.R		Mint: Moscow Mint	
Value: 10 apsars	Alloy:	Quantity:	Quality:
Issued: 6 December 2010	Diameter: 39.0 mm	Thickness: 3.3 mm	Weight: 33.94
Drandsky Assumption Cathedral			
Designers: Japua B.R		Mint: Moscow Mint	
Value: 10 apsars	Alloy:	Quantity:	Quality:
Issued: 6 December 2010	Diameter: 39.0 mm	Thickness: 3.3 mm	Weight: 33.94

=== 2011 ===
==== Commemorative Coin of 2011 World Domino Championship ====
World Domino Championships			
Designers: Japua B.R.		Mint: Saint Petersburg Mint	
Value: 10 apsars	Alloy: Au 925	Quantity: Uncirculated	Quality: Uncirculated
Issued: 12 September 2011	Diameter: 39.0 mm	Thickness:	Weight:

==== Commemorative Coins of 2011 Historic Monuments of Abkhazia ====
Church of St. Simon the Canaanite			
Designers: Japua B.R		Mint: Moscow Mint	
Value: 10 apsars	Alloy:	Quantity:	Quality:
Issued: 15 February 2012	Diameter: 39.0 mm	Thickness: 3.3 mm	Weight: 33.94

=== 2012 ===
==== Commemorative Coins of 2012 Historic Monuments of Abkhazia ====
The Dormition Cathedral of Myku			
Designers: Japua B.R		Mint: Moscow Mint	
Value: 10 apsars	Alloy:	Quantity:	Quality:
Issued: 15 February 2012	Diameter: 39.0 mm	Thickness: 3.3 mm	Weight: 33.94
Patriarchal cathedral in Pitsunda			
Designers: Japua B.R		Mint: Moscow Mint	
Value: 10 apsars	Alloy:	Quantity:	Quality:
Issued: 15 February 2012	Diameter: 39.0 mm	Thickness: 3.3 mm	Weight: 33.94
The Bedia Сathedral of the Mother of God			
Designers: Japua B.R		Mint: Moscow Mint	
Value: 10 apsars	Alloy:	Quantity:	Quality:
Issued: 15 February 2012	Diameter: 39.0 mm	Thickness: 3.3 mm	Weight: 33.94
The Church of St. George in Ilori			
Designers: Japua B.R		Mint: Moscow Mint	
Value: 10 apsars	Alloy:	Quantity:	Quality:
Issued: 15 February 2012	Diameter: 39.0 mm	Thickness: 3.3 mm	Weight: 33.94
The Dormition Cathedral of Dranda			
Designers: Japua B.R		Mint: Moscow Mint	
Value: 10 apsars	Alloy:	Quantity:	Quality:
Issued: 15 February 2012	Diameter: 39.0 mm	Thickness: 3.3 mm	Weight: 33.94
The Dormition Cathedral of Lykhny			
Designers: Japua B.R		Mint: Moscow Mint	
Value: 10 apsars	Alloy:	Quantity:	Quality:
Issued: 15 February 2012	Diameter: 39.0 mm	Thickness: 3.3 mm	Weight: 33.94

=== Banknotes of the Abkhazian apsar ===
On 29 September 2018, the National Bank of the Republic of Abkhazia issued its first banknote for 500 apsars, in commemoration of the 25th Anniversary of the victory in the Patriotic War of the People of Abkhazia and its first president, Vladislav Arynba. 10,000 notes were printed, but were not released for general circulation.

In 2023, the National Bank of the Republic of Abkhazia issued a 25 apsars banknote, in commemoration of the 30th anniversary of the victory in the Patriotic War of the People of Abkhazia. 15,000 notes were printed, but were not issued for general circulation.

In April 2024, the bank released images of new commemorative banknotes of 10 and 100 apsar. These notes were introduced on 10 June 2024.

In May 2025, the bank released images of new commemorative banknotes of 50 apsar. It was issued on 1 June 2025.

In June 2026, the bank released images of new commemorative banknotes of 200 Apsar, with 5000 notes put into circulation.

Banknotes of the Abkhazian apsar
Image		Value	Dimensions	Main colour	Description			Date of issue	Ref.
Obverse	Reverse	Value	Dimensions	Main colour	Obverse	Reverse	Watermark	Date of issue	Ref.
		10 apsars	150 × 65 mm	Yellow	Caucasian leopard, bronze axe	Bronze axe, alabasha (traditional military staff)	Face of Caucasian leopard	10 June 2024	
		25 apsars	150 × 65 mm	Green	Head of an eagle, eagle in flight	Abkhaz soldiers	Head of an eagle	22 May 2023	
		50 apsars	150 × 65 mm	Blue	Black Sea bottlenose dolphins, jellyfish	Medieval warship, seahorse	Anchor inside a diamond	1 June 2025	
		100 apsars	150 × 65 mm	Purple	Caspian red deer, blackbird with pine branch, Caucasus Mountains	Dolmens, and cromlech from early Bronze Age	Head of a Caspian red deer	10 June 2024	
		200 apsars	150 × 65 mm	Red	Nestor Lakoba, Abkhaz SSR coat of arms, Kiaraz horseman	Traditional Abkhaz courtyard, soaring hawk	Seven stars in a semi-circle	1 June 2026	
		500 apsars	150 × 65 mm	Brown	Vladislav Ardzinba, soldiers raising the flag of Abkhazia	Ornament with the emblem of Abkhazia, map of Abkhazia	Basket weave pattern	29 September 2018	
These images are to scale at 0.7 pixel per millimetre (18 pixel per inch). For table standards, see the banknote specification table.
