= Millhouse Capital =

Roman Abramovich asset-management company

Millhouse Capital/LLC
- Company type: Holding company
- Industry: Diversified investments
- Founded: 2001
- Founder: Roman Abramovich
- Headquarters: London
- Key people: Roman Abramovich (David Davidovich)
- Total assets: More than $1 billion
- Owner: Roman Abramovich
- Website: (www.millhouses.com)

Millhouse Capital is a British registered company. It was created in 2001 to manage assets owned by the Russian businessman Roman Abramovich and his partners.

== Overview ==
The chairman of the company is Russian-American businessman Eugene Shvidler. Its assets under management included major stakes in oil company Sibneft (now Gazprom Neft), Russian Aluminium, Aeroflot, and RusPromAvto, as well as investments in electricity, pulp and paper processing, insurance and banking.

The company controls the Prodo agricultural group, which it took over in 2003.

== Holdings ==
Millhouse Capital's shareholders sold their 26 per cent holding in OAO Aeroflot in 2003 and a 50 per cent stake in OAO Russian Aluminium (UC RUSAL), now the world's largest aluminium producer, in two deals spanning 2003 and 2004. The sale prices were not disclosed.

In October 2005, Millhouse Capital sold a 72% stake in Sibneft to Gazprom for more than US$13 billion.

In Russia, the company owns real estate assets worth over 900 million euros, including the Four Winds Plaza, an office and residential building in Moscow, and the Hotel Kristall in the Black Sea resort of Guelendjik.

Millhouse Capital was initially based at Abbey House in Weybridge, a large two storey office building on the edge of the St. George's Hill estate, before moving to Stamford Bridge following Abramovich's acquisition of Chelsea Football Club in 2003. It had a larger representative office in Moscow.

In a reorganization following the sale of Sibneft, the Moscow office of Millhouse Capital was closed and a new company, Moscow-based Millhouse LLC, was formed in April 2006 to manage the assets of Abramovich and his partners. The London office of Millhouse Capital was closed in August 2008 and its functions rolled into a new firm, MHC (Services) Ltd.
