= Peter Bezukladnikov =

Russian businessman

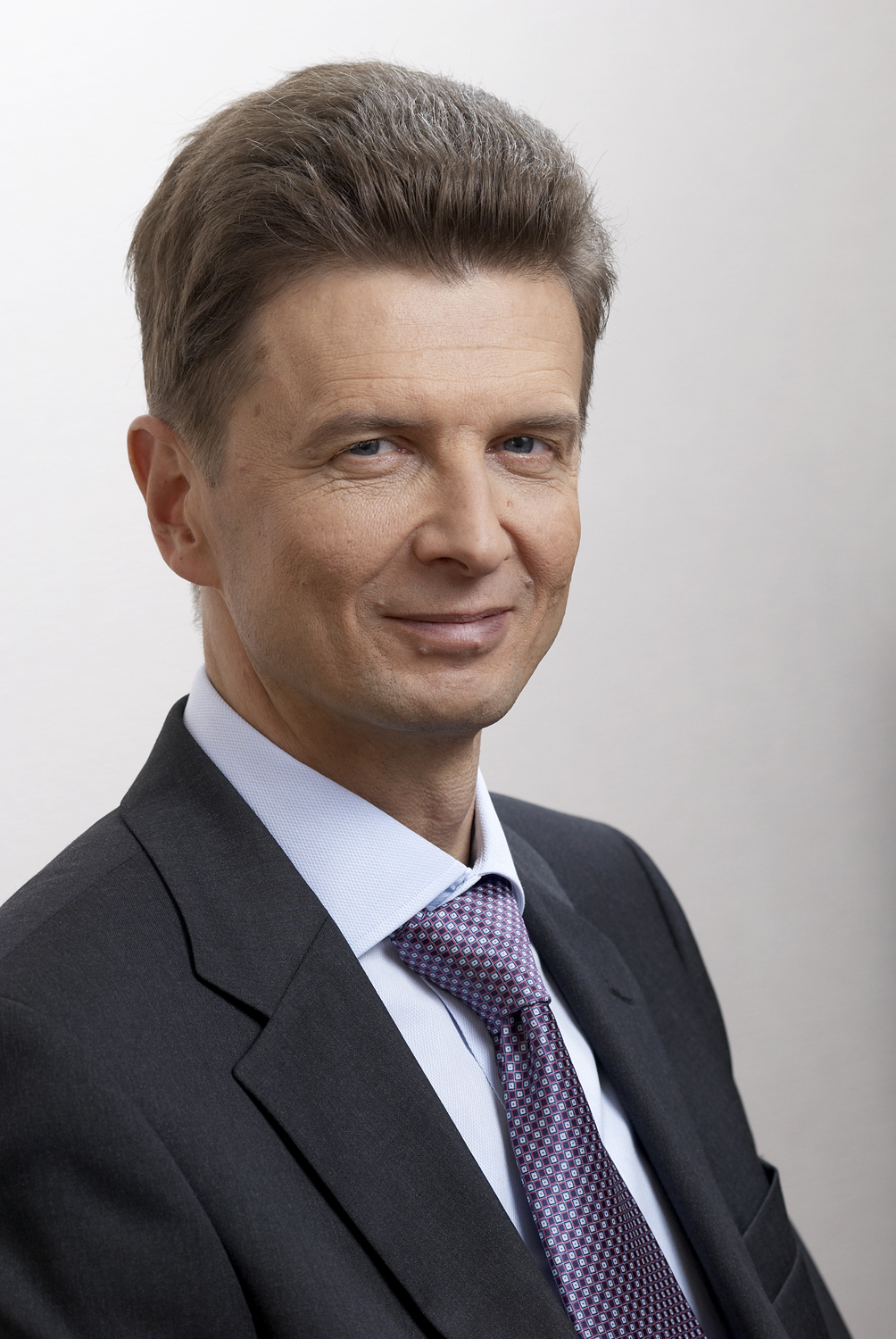

Personal details
- Born: 1959 (age 66–67) Lvov
- Profession: General Director of JSC E4 Group

Peter Wolframovich Bezukladnikov (Russian: Пётр Вольфрамович Безукладников) is former General Director of Russian biggest engineering company E4 Group (revenue $1.5bln, 18,000 employees) and formerly a scientist in the field of structural analysis of carbohydrates. From September 2009 - the executive vice president, director of the electric power department of the TEK Business Unit, Sistema OJSC.

== Education and scientific career ==
Bezukladnikov graduated from the Department of Molecular and Chemical Physics of the Moscow Institute of Physics and Technology in 1982 and continued on to receive Ph.D. in chemistry. As a scientist at the Pacific Institute of Bioorganic Chemistry, Far East Branch of the USSR Academy of Sciences, he was the first to apply ESI/AP/MS (Electrospray ionization/atmospheric pressure/Mass spectrometry) for the structural analysis of carbohydrates.
