= E4 Group =

JSC E4 Group
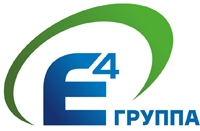
- Industry: Engineering
- Founded: 2006
- Headquarters: Moscow, Russia
- Key people: Abyzov Mikhail (Chairman of the board)
- Revenue: $1.5bln billion
- Number of employees: 18,000 (2008)
- Website: www.e4group.ru

E4 group is a Russian engineering company, one of the biggest in the Russian Federation. With a presence in all federal districts of Russia, it has a total of 20,000 employees (up to 30,000 with affiliated firms). The current CEO of E4 Group is Danil Nikitin.

== Financial information ==
E4 Group was established in 2006. The main achievements of the company in 2007 were a market share of 15 percent; consolidated revenue growth of 90 percent; contract sales growth of 150 percent; and net profit growth of 260 percent.

=== Main projects ===
Projects include the N’yagan Regional Power Plant; construction of CPP-410 Krasnodar TPP; boiler, North-west borough of Kursk – construction of CCP 125MW; and construction of a nuclear waste storage facility at Zheleznogorsk, Krasnoyarsk Krai.

== See also ==
- Mikhail Abyzov
- Peter Bezukladnikov
