= Mikhail Abyzov =

Russian businessman

- Михаил Абызов
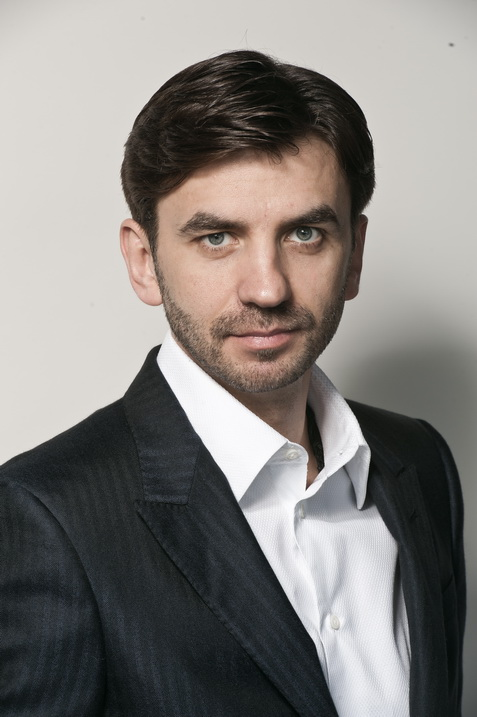
- Abyzov in 2018

Minister for Open Government Affairs
- In office 21 May 2012 – 7 May 2018
- Prime Minister: Dmitry Medvedev
- Preceded by: Position established
- Succeeded by: Position abolished

Personal details
- Born: 3 June 1972 (age 54) Minsk, Byelorussian SSR, USSR
- Education: Sholokhov Moscow State University for Humanities

Mikhail Anatolyevich Abyzov (Russian: Михаил Анатольевич Абызов; born 3 June 1972) is a manager in the Russian energy and engineering industry, He was the chairman of the board of directors of Russia's biggest engineering company, E4 Group.

== Education ==
Abyzov studied at the Department of Mechanics and Mathematics of Moscow State University, but never graduated. Abyzov received his diploma of higher education in 2000 from the Sholokhov Moscow State Open Pedagogical University (now Sholokhov Moscow State University for Humanities) in 2000.

== Start of the career ==
In 1990, Abyzov set up his first company, Intershops, which sold Turkish consumer goods and then office equipment. In 1992, together with a fellow student of Bulgaria, Milen Mitsik, he set up a joint venture, MMB-Group, to sell Bulgarian products. At the same time, the company set to work with the Defense Ministry and the Ministry of Internal Affairs (MIA) thanks to the fact that Abyzov met a high-ranking executive of one of the law-enforcement agencies at a shooting range. MMB-group supplied AvtoVAZ-made spare parts for the Main Internal Affairs Directorate of the city of Moscow. The MIA helped Abyzov's company solve shipments problems — when a regular shipment was detained at the factory by the groupings that controlled it, a joint detachment of the Special Police Task Force (OMON) came flying in Togliatti to deal with the problem.

Most transactions in the 1990s were paid for with goods or debts through barter schemes because of a shortage of cash in Russia. As a result of one of these transactions, Abyzov's company became the holder of a debt of the Novosibirsk Chemical Concentrates Factory. Through that transaction, Abyzov met a deputy of the State Duma in 1993, Ivan Starikov, representing Novosibirsk Region, who appointed Abyzov as his assistant.

Starikov introduced Abyzov to the then Governor of Novosibirsk Region, Vitaliy Mukha. Through that new acquaintance, Abyzov's company, United Russian Fuel and Energy Company (ORTEK), managed to become the largest fuel supplier to Novosibirsk Region. In 1995, Novosibirsk Region faced a shortage of fuel for the sowing season. Abyzov suggested that fuel be supplied from Mozyr Oil Refinery (Belarus) upon the security of 19.5% of Novosibirskenergo shares. In 1997, Novosibirsk Region failed to pay for the fuel supplied, and the shares of Novosibirskenergo passed to Abyzov.

In 1998, Abyzov was appointed as deputy chairman of the board of directors of Novosibirskenergo. The chairman of the board of directors was Dmitriy Zhurba, a co-owner of Alemar, a Novosibirsk-based investment company, and the second deputy chairman was Leonid Melamed, the founder of Alemar. In 1995, Alemar which serviced the accounts of Novosibirsk-based businesses suggested that the administration of Novosibirsk Region draw investors to Novosibirskenergo. Novosibirsk Region transferred 35% of new shares of Novosibirskenergo to the company on the security of Alemar's promissory note. But Alemar placed only 13% of the shares, with 22% remaining on its balance sheet.

Once he had become a co-owner of Novosibirskenergo, Abyzov “joined forces” with Alemar to control the energy company. By 1999, Abyzov had increased his interest in Novosibirskenergo to 24.59% by purchasing minority shares (through Tantyema, a firm owned by Abyzov). Melamed and Zhurba lent a hand to Abyzov.

In 2000, the Russian General Prosecutor's Office charged the ex-governor of Novosibirsk Region Vitaliy Mukha with misfeasance under Article 286 of the Russian Criminal Code, and Leonid Nikonov, former head of the State Property Committee of Novosibirsk Region, with abuse of office (Article 285 of the Russian Criminal Code), considering that the Novosibirskenergo shares had been disposed of improperly. The block of Novosibirskenergo share, the market value of which was up to $40 million, was valued at $570,000 for the transaction. “As a result of those transactions, the state forfeited the right to participate in the management of a business entity operating in a strategic industry, the energy sector,” as it was set out in a statement signed by Valentin Simuchenkov, Deputy Prosecutor-General of the Russian Federation. In 2001, the criminal case was closed because the statute of limitation had expired. In 2002, the equity stake in Novosibirskenergo reflected on the balance sheet of Alemar was sold to a subsidiary of Novosibirskenergo, ZAO Sibirenergoinvest. Thus, Abyzov became the sole controlling shareholder of Novosibirskenergo. In 2003, the Federal Security Service made seizures at Novosibirskenergo. The law-enforcement agencies accused the company's management of understating the volume of electricity transmitted through the grids of GUP (State Unitary Enterprise) Novosibirskoblenergo in 2002, which resulted in the company incurring a loss of 72 million rubles. In 2004, the case was closed for the absence of the event of a crime.

In 2011, Novosibirskenergo was renamed to OJSC Sibeko. In 2018, Abyzov sold the shares he owned in Sibeko to Siberian Generating Company owned by Andrey Melnichenko with whom he studied together at Physics and Mathematics Boarding School No. 18 at Moscow State University, for 32 billion rubles. Abyzov was personally involved in negotiating the sale of the shares notwithstanding a ban on entrepreneurial activity that he was required to observe due to his position as Minister for Open Government Affairs of the Russian Federation.

== RAO UES ==
In 1998, Abyzov was appointed as the head of the Department of Investment Policy and Business Projects of RAO UES (Russian Joint-Stock Company “Unified Energy Systems”). In 1999, he became a deputy chairman of the management board of RAO UES. Abyzov was introduced to Chubais, chairman of the management board of RAO UES, by Starikov. As deputy chairman of the management board, Abyzov was responsible for changing the structure of payments for electricity from barter schemes to cash settlements, and, in addition, for fuel supply to the energy companies that were part of RAO UES. Abyzov personally negotiated with suppliers, with fuel companies set up under his leadership checking the purchase volumes. He established a corporate management system for coal purchases at RAO UES.

In 2004, Abyzov became managing director of Business Unit No. 1, which was charged with supervising the establishment of three thermal wholesale generation companies, 10 territorial generation companies, self-contained power systems in the Far East, and guaranteed supply companies.

German Gref, the then Minister for Economic Development of the Russian Federation, was adamantly opposed to the appointment of Abyzov to the management board of RAO UES. Viktor Kudryavyi, a member of the RAO UES board of directors and former Deputy Minister of Energy, believed that Abyzov was pursuing his own commercial interests.

In 2005, Abyzov tendered his resignation.

In 2006, RAO appointed an investment commission headed by Abyzov. Under his leadership, the commission met once, in December 2006.

In February 2007, Gref successfully insisted that the commission be re-elected and headed by Andrei Zadernyuk, technical director of Mezhregionenergo. Speaking at a meeting of the RAO UES board of directors, Gref spoke about the possibility of instituting criminal proceedings against Abyzov and emphasized that the chairman of the RAO UES Investment Commission, which deals with approving investment programs for the holding's subsidiaries, may not have his own interest in the energy sector. At that time, Abyzov owned E4, an engineering company which was engaged in the construction of power facilities.

During his work at RAO UES, despite a conflict of interests, Abyzov and Melamed purchased shares in energy companies: shares in Samaraenergo, Saratovenergo, and Ulyanovskenergo were purchased through a brokerage account with Troika Dialog. Abyzov also participated in paper trading for Gazprom in the gray market purchasing shares on a Russian platform and selling them in the form of ADRs on a foreign one. The market of Gazprom shares was not liberalized until 2005.

== Kuzbassrazrezugol and arms business ==
In 2005, Abyzov was appointed as general director of OJSC Kuzbassrazrezugol MC (Management Company Open Joint-Stock Company) owned by Iskander Makhmudov and Andrey Bokarev, chairman of the board of directors. Both also owned 24.5% of Kalashnikov Concern, Russia's largest manufacturer of small arms, until November 2017.

Kuzbassrazrezugol was one of the largest suppliers of coal to Novosibirskenergo. Abyzov talked about having plans to merge Kuzbassrazrezugol and Novosibirskenergo. The chairman of the board of directors of Kuzbassrazrezugol MC, Bokarev, told the press that Kuzbassrazrezugol might buy out the controlling stake in Novosibirskenergo from Abyzov. In 2006, Kuzbassrazrezugol acquired 51% of Powerfuel, a British coal company. Abyzov became the chairman of its board of directors. In 2007, Abyzov and Bokarev's alliance with Makhmudov broke up, and Abyzov stepped down as the general director of Kuzbassrazrezugol, retaining his stake in Powerfuel which went bankrupt shortly after receiving 180 million Euros in subsidies from the EU for a CO_{2} emissionsreduction project.

In 2003, as a member of the RAO UES management board, Abyzov supervised judo and Greco-Roman wrestling support. That is how Abyzov met Arkadiy and Boris Rotenbergs. Since that time, Abyzov and the Rotenbergs had “regular partnerships — we worked with SMP Bank and with insurance companies that were associated with them”.

In 2006, Bokarev introduced Abyzov to Konstantin Nikolayev who invited him to become a partner in one of his projects, the Mostotrest construction company. At that time, Arkadiy Rotenberg was one of the co-owners of that company, indirectly owning 9.3% of Mostotrest. In 2010, just before the Mostotrest IPO at the Moscow Stock Exchange, Abyzov announced that he had sold to Arkadiy Rotenberg his 50% stake in Marc O’Polo Investments which owned 50.3% of Mostotrest.

In 2010, Nikolayev invited Abyzov to participate in his new project, the establishment of Promtekhnologhii, a company to manufacture the T-5000 rifles, which are sold under the ORSIS brand. In 2012, as Minister for Open Government Affairs, Abyzov headed a government commission on public-private partnerships in the sphere of the military industrial complex. The Ministry of Internal Affairs, the Federal Security Service, the Federal Protection Service, and the Federal National Guard Troops Service (Rosgvardiya) took into service the T-5000 rifles. In 2015, Maria Butina, an activist for the right to carry weapons accused in the U.S. of espionage in favor of the Russian Federation, presented ORSIS to a delegation from the National Rifle Association of America visiting the Promtekhnologhii plant.

== KES Holding ==
In 2006, Abyzov began discussing with Viktor Vekselberg, the founder of the Renova group, the possibility of obtaining an equity stake in the energy company KES Holding, which Renova was in the process of establishing at that time. Abyzov preferred not to formalize his participation in the company, because when leaving RAO UES, as he acknowledged himself, he undertook not to participate in the capital of any energy companies. To conceal his intention to participate in KES (Integrated Energy Systems) Holding, Abyzov arranged for his contributions to the authorized capital to be made in the form of loans. Abyzov-controlled companies transferred to Integrated Energy Systems and Renova Industries about $380 million from 2006 to 2008. Abyzov himself said that he had paid $50 million to extend the opportunity to become a shareholder of KES Holding. Abyzov and Renova did not disclose that they could become partners. It was not until 2009 that Abyzov confirmed that he had been given the opportunity to participate in the capital of KES Holding at any time he saw fit.

In 2011, as part of arrangements for the sale of KES Holding to Gazprom Energoholding, Renova and Abyzov began formalizing Abyzov's participation in the company's capital. One of the conditions for selling KES Holding to Gazprom Energoholding was granting Abyzov a put option for his shareholding at a price of $451 million exercisable till 1 July 2013. The deal with Gazprom Energoholding never took place. While Abyzov was appointed Minister for Open Government Affairs in 2012; therefore, he again preferred not to make his participation in the energy company public and not to take possession of a stake in the company. Nevertheless, Abyzov demanded in 2013 that Vekselberg pay him $451 million for the stake in the company, insisting that he was entitled to that through the put option. Renova petitioned the British Virgin Islands court for declaring the put option invalid because the deal with Gazprom Energoholding had come off. Besides, Abyzov failed to fulfill the terms of the joint investment agreement signed by the parties in 2011 — namely, he did not take possession of KES Holding shares. Six months later, Abyzov, despite his status as a federal minister, filed a personal lawsuit against Vekselberg demanding $488 million in damages for his failure to fulfill the 2006 verbal arrangement regarding his participation in the capital of KES Holding. Vekselberg denies that any verbal arrangements were made, insisting that Abyzov should first fulfill the terms of the 2011 agreement and take possession of an equity stake in the company. In 2019, Vekselberg filed a personal lawsuit against Abyzov with the Gagarinsky District Court of Moscow demanding that the 2006 verbal agreement be declared unconcluded, since a dispute between Russian citizens over Russian assets should be heard by a Russian court. The court dismissed the lawsuit on the grounds that the matter was already pending in the British Virgin Islands court.

== Е4 ==
In 2006, Abyzov started business on the assets of RAO UES. He founded E4, an engineering company which was to become Russia's first end-to-end cycle contractor. The idea was to acquire construction and repair companies in the regions where RAO UES was expecting large construction projects to be implemented. The companies were acquired through Reserve Regional Company at auctions held by RAO UES. E4 publicly denied any connection with Reserve. About 10 billion rubles was spent on the purchase of construction and repair assets. In 2006, the composition of E4 included 12 construction and repair companies operating in 25 regions. And in 2007, RAO UES became the main customer of E4, with the order portfolio reaching 79.2 billion rubles. At its peak, in 2013, the order portfolio of E4 reached 160 billion rubles, and the market share, according to Abyzov himself, was up to 50%.

The first general director of E4 was Pyotr Bezukladnikov, who was responsible for the North-Western region of RAO UES. In 2009, Bezukladnikov was replaced by Danila Nikitin from RU-COM, which manages Abyzov's assets, and in 2011 by Vladimir Kalinin, a former FNC (Federal Network Company) top manager. In 2012, the position of E4 General Director was abolished, with a position of the president introduced which was filled by Andrey Malyshev who worked as the deputy chairman of the Rosnano management board from 2011. From 2007 to 2011, Malyshev served as the deputy chairman of the management board at Rosnanotech (renamed to Rosnano in 2011). While from 2006 to 2007, he was the deputy head of Rosatom State Corporation.

In 2012, the financial situation of E4 began to deteriorate: there was a lack of funds to service all the construction obligations assumed. In 2013, JSC E4 Group acquired controlling stakes in OJSC Siberian Energy Scientific and Technical Center, OJSC Sibtechenergo, OJSC E4-Centrenergomontazh, CJSC E4-SibCOTES, and JSC Bureyagesstroy through a chain of companies affiliated with Eforg Asset Management Limited of Cyprus, a 100% shareholder of E4, the beneficiary of which was Yekaterina Sirotenko, Abyzov's first wife. The obligations to buy the shares were imposed on Eforg, E4's owner, to improve the balance sheet structure and technically increase the assets of E4, which by then was experiencing significant difficulties. This allowed E4 to attract new loans, but 58% of the funds borrowed by it after 2013 were never repaid.

In 2014, Alfa Bank and Sberbank demanded that the loans be prepaid. In 2015, bankruptcy proceedings were initiated against E4 Group. Abyzov tried to negotiate with the creditors, suggesting that they withdraw their claims in exchange for restructuring, but to no avail. The total amount of E4's debt was 34 billion rubles.

In 2015, Alfa Bank filed a criminal complaint on suspicion of credit fraud. Peter Aven, chairman of the board of directors of Alfa Bank, complained to President Vladimir Putin about Abyzov. After that filing, a dossier was put together for Putin on Abyzov's offshore companies and the structure of Abyzov's ownership of Sibeko through Cypriot companies and Emmerson International Corp. registered in the British Virgin Islands was disclosed. A criminal case against E4's management was initiated by the Moscow Main Administration of the Ministry of Internal Affairs in 2017. In 2018, Alfa Bank demanded that Abyzov, Sirotenko, and Malyshev be held jointly liable for E4's loans. In 2019, Abyzov's Singapore-based companies owning Emmerson International Corp. went into administration on the lawsuit filed by Alfa Bank. The British Virgin Islands court also appointed an administrator for Emmerson to protect the company's assets in the event that Alfa Bank's claims against Abyzov and the companies controlled by him were upheld.

== Bright Capital ==
In 2010, Abyzov founded a venture capital fund, Bright Capital. Abyzov invested $300 million in the fund. The investments were primarily made by the fund in the U.S. and Europe. Boris Ryabov and Mikhail Chuchkevich were the managing partners of the fund. One of Bright Capital's first investments was a $15 million investment in Alion Energy, a company engaged in robotics engineering. At that time, Abyzov was on the board of directors of Alion Energy as a representative of Batios Holdings Limited.

In June 2018, Chuchkevich was arrested on charges of embezzling 1.3 billion rubles from the state-owned Russian Venture Company (RVC). The investigation revealed that in 2012, Chuchkevich entered into a collision with Yan Ryazantsev who at the time was the director of the Investment Department and a member of RVC's management board. Together they transferred from the account of a London-based subsidiary of RVC to the account of Alion Energy $22.7 million which they cashed and embezzled. Thus, RVC incurred damages of about 1.3 billion rubles.

After Chuchkevich's arrest, Ryabov has been the managing director of Bright Capital. The fund continues to actively invest in U.S. startups notwithstanding Abyzov's arrest. In October 2018, the fund was a late-stage co-financier of the Genomatica project, which is working toward creating environmentally friendly materials from renewable feed stocks. In January 2021, Bright Capital invested in Transphorm, a startup working on the creation of gallium nitride transistors for high-voltage energy converters.

== Minister for Open Government Affairs ==
In 2011, President Dmitriy Medvedev appointed Abyzov as coordinator of the public committee of his adherents, which was to develop a program for the new government. In January 2012, Abyzov became advisor to the president for coordinating the work of the Open Government, and in May 2012 the Minister for Open Government Affairs.

During his tenure as minister, from 2012 to 2016, Abyzov's annual income increased by 8.6 times from 60.7 million rubles to 520.9 million rubles. The minister's income dropped sharply in 2017 to 181.2 million rubles a year; however, Abyzov remained one of the richest officials in the Russian government during all those years, and in 2015 was the wealthiest among them.

The idea of “an open government” was to simplify the interaction of citizens with the agencies. The government agencies became obliged to publish information about their activities in the Internet, with portals appearing for public services, public procurement, draft regulations, and electronic budget.

As a minister, Abyzov headed the commission on public-private partnerships in the military industrial complex, while remaining a co-owner of Promtekhnologii, a rifle manufacturing factory, and continuing to receive income from it.

In addition, an expert working group for the Open Government under the leadership of Abyzov reviewed petitions from citizens who had collected more than 100,000 signatures. Among the initiatives supported by the Open Government was the proposal to expand the right of citizens to self-defense in their own homes, put forward by Maria Butina’s Right to Gun movement.

In 2017, Alexei Navalny, an opposition activist, published a video showing that Abyzov owned a villa, Il Tesoro, in Tuscany, in the province of Grosseto. The villa with adjacent vineyards and an olive grove covers an area of 346 hectares. Abyzov owns the villa through Villa Il Tesoro Societa Agricola S.R.L., which belongs to Cyprus-based Anduril Enterprises Limited. Its founder is Emmerson International Corp. In November 2020, the community court in Massa Maritima seized Villa Il Tesoro Societa Agricola S.R.L.’s accounts at the request of the financial police, who ascertained that since 2011 the villa had not been engaged in rural tourism while continuing to enjoy the tax benefits granted to that type of business.

In 2019, the Baza publication found out that in October 2012, while he was in ministerial position, Abyzov gave his son Daniel a villa at the Italian resort of Castiglione della Pescaia as an adulthood gift.

In 2019, an investigation by OCCRP and Novaya Gazeta journalists uncovered Abyzov’s offshore network. The accounts of his 70 companies opened with Estonia’s Swedbank Eesti received $860 million, with $770 million withdrawn to offshore jurisdictions: Cyprus, the British Virgin Islands, and Singapore.

== Criminal action ==
In 2018, after Vladimir Putin had been elected president for another term, a new government was formed. Abyzov did not make the roster and soon left the Russian Federation. After that, Abyzov lived at his villa in Tuscany.

On 26 March 2019 the Investigative Committee of the Russian Federation reported that criminal investigation proceedings had been instituted against Abyzov on suspicion of committing crimes during the period from April 2011 to November 2014 under part 3 in Article 210 of the Russian Criminal Code and part 4 in Article 159 of the Russian Criminal Code (building a criminal organization using one’s official position; large-scale fraud). On the same day, Abyzov was detained by the Federal Security Service officers.

The chairman of the government, D. A. Medvedev, learned about the proceedings against Abyzov following his apprehension. Later, the prime minister explained that Abyzov’s commercial activities were completely unknown to him, but that he was aware of a conflict between Abyzov and his creditors, which was exactly what “evolved into a criminal law case”.

Experts pointed out that the events that Abyzov was charged with took place in 2011 to 2014, when he was already working as the “open government” minister, but was earning super profits by combining state and entrepreneurial activities. The Speaker of the Council of the Federation, V.I. Matviyenko, drew attention to Minister Abyzov's control of offshore companies, which, in addition to basic embezzlement, is all by itself a violation of the laws.

President Putin's press secretary Dmitriy Peskov said that President Putin knew in advance about an inquiry into Abyzov's activities, but the Kremlin was not at liberty to comment on the attitude to his apprehension, lest it be perceived as pressure on the inquiry.

On 27 March 2019 Abyzov was arrested by the court until 25 May 2019. Abyzov's interests are represented in court by eight lawyers. The lawyers suggested a house arrest in Barvikha and a bail of one billion rubles as an alternative to custodial detention, but the court refused to change the level of restriction. On 23 May 2019 the Basmanny court extended Abyzov's apprehension until 25 July 2019. The court also noted that the investigation had presented convincing evidence of Abyzov's implication in the alleged crimes. Subsequently, the court repeatedly extended Abyzov's custodial detention periods. For the last time, Abyzov's custodial detention was extended until 25 March 2021.

On 13 August 2020 the Investigative Committee of the Russian Federation completed its investigation and brought final charges against Abyzov and his accomplices under Article 210 of the Criminal Code (building a criminal organization using one's official position), part 4 in Article 159 of the Criminal Code (large-scale fraud), items “a” and “b” in part 4, Article 174.1 of the Criminal Code (legalization of money received as a result of committing a crime), Article 204 of the Criminal Code (commercial bribery), and Article 289 of the Criminal Code (illegal involvement in entrepreneurial activities). As reported by the Russian Investigative Committee, it was ascertained that Mikhail Abyzov and his accomplices had been involved in the legalization of money received as a result of committing a crime as well as in commercial bribery. Also, his accomplices were identified, in particular, the former top managers of JSC Siberian Energy Company (Sibeko) — Ruslan Vlasov, Yana Balan, and Oksana Rozhenkova, as well as the director of Ru-Kom LLC, Oleg Serebrennikov.

According to the investigation, from April 2011 to November 2014, Abyzov as the beneficial owner of offshore companies, together with Nikolai Stepanov and Maksim Rusakov, set up and took on leadership in a criminal association. In 2014, Abyzov stole money from OJSC Sibeko and OJSC RES totaling 4 billion rubles, which resulted, among other things, in an unjustified tariff burden on energy consumers, and the stolen funds were withdrawn from Russia and deposited in accounts with Cypriot banks. In addition, Abyzov, wishing to sell a block of shares in JSC Sibeko, the actual ownership of which was concealed by him in violation of the anticorruption laws of the Russian Federation, gave 78 million rubles to the former top managers of Sibeko as a commercial bribe.

Abyzov had a total of 15 accomplices. Four of the persons involved — Vladimir Niyazov, Sergei Stolyarov, Andrei Titorenko, and Konstantin Tyan — are on an international wanted list.

The investigation took interim measures, including the seizure of RES shares which Abyzov continues to own through offshore companies.

In August 2020, the Prosecutor General's Office of Russia issued a press release. The Main Supervisory Department for Major Investigations of the Prosecutor General's Office of the Russian Federation ascertained that Abyzov had concealed information about his property status, including ownership of offshore companies, and during his public service as a minister of the Government of the Russian Federation, continued to engage in entrepreneurial activities using his official position. In that connection, the General Prosecutor's Office of Russia, on the basis of item 8 in part 2, Article 235 of the Russian Civil Code (reversion of property to the Russian Federation by a court decision for which, in accordance with the anti-corruption laws of the Russian Federation, no evidence of its acquisition by using lawful income was provided), filed a claim for the recovery from Abyzov and the foreign companies under his control of monetary funds in the amount of 32.5 billion rubles to the revenue of the Russian Federation.

On 20 October 2020 the Gagarinsky District Court of Moscow fully sustained the claims of the General Prosecutor's Office of the Russian Federation and recovered 32,540,718,646 rubles 44 kopecks from Abyzov and the companies under his control (Alinor Investments Limited, Besta Holdings Limited, Kullen Holdings Limited, Lisento Investments Ltd, and Vantroso Trading Ltd), setting a record for the Russian judicial system. In considering the case, the court ascertained the facts that Abyzov had continued his business activities while serving as a minister of the Government of the Russian Federation and also used his official position to do so. The court pointed out that Abyzov had thereby violated Article 11 of the Federal Constitutional Law “On the Government of the Russian Federation” and part 3 in Article 12.1 of the Federal Anti-Corruption Law. May 21, 2021 the court of Moscow confirmed the Gagarinsky District Court's decision, it came into legal force.

In March 2021, the General Prosecutor's Office requested assistance from the Italian law-enforcement agencies with the seizure of the villas owned by Abyzov and his son Daniel.

In December 2023, Abyzov paid more than 20 billion rubles to the budget. He still has about 11 billion left to pay.

== Controversies ==
In 2011, Abyzov's company Bright Capital invested $75 million into flexible solar panels maker Alta Devices. Alta developed solar panels to mount on drones, aircraft, etc., in order to allow the vehicle to stay aloft for long periods of time. The company has cooperated with the U.S. Naval Research Laboratory in Washington, D.C. The company manufactures robots for automatic assembly of solar photovoltaic plants. Bright Capital invested $15 million as the first investor of the company.

In 2018, Bright Capital's managing director, Mikhail Chuchkevich, was arrested in Russia on suspicion of embezzlement. The Investigative Committee of Russia alleges he embezzled $20 million from the Russian Venture Co. through US-based Alion Energy. Alion Energy management has denied these claims.

In 2019 Mikhail Abyzov was charged of defrauding Siberian energy companies of $62m and moving the proceeds offshore. He was arrested in March 2019. In 2023, Abyzov was sentenced to 12 years in prison on charges of embezzlement and criminal conspiracy. He was also fined 80 million rubles (approximately $860,000).
