= Bagrat Shinkuba =

Abkhazian writer and political figure (1917-2004)

- Баграҭ Уасыл-иҧа Шьынқәба
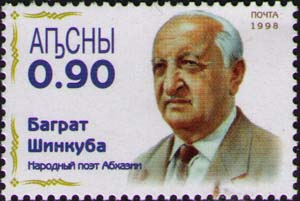
- Bagrat Shinkuba on a 1999 stamp of Abkhazia
- Born: May 12, 1917; Chlou, Ochamchira District, Sukhum Okrug, Kutais Governorate, Imperial Russia
- Died: February 25, 2004 (aged 86); Sukhum, Republic of Georgia
- Writing career
- Notable works: Chanta's Arrival (1968); The Last of the Departed (1974)

Bagrat Uasyl-ipa Shinkuba (Note: Abkhaz: Баграҭ Уасыл-иҧа Шьынқәба; Russian: Баграт Васильевич Шинкуба) (12 May 1917 – 25 February 2004) was an Abkhaz writer, poet, historian, linguist and politician. He studied history and languages of Abkhaz, Adyghe and Ubykh people. A prolific poet, Bagrat Shinkuba published First Songs, his first volume of poetry in 1935. His novel The Last of the Departed is dedicated to the tragic destiny of Ubykh nation, which became extinct along a hundred of years.

From 1953 to 1958, he was chair of the Writer's Union of Abkhazia. From 1958 to 1978 he was the Chairman of the Supreme Council Presidium of the Abkhaz ASSR.

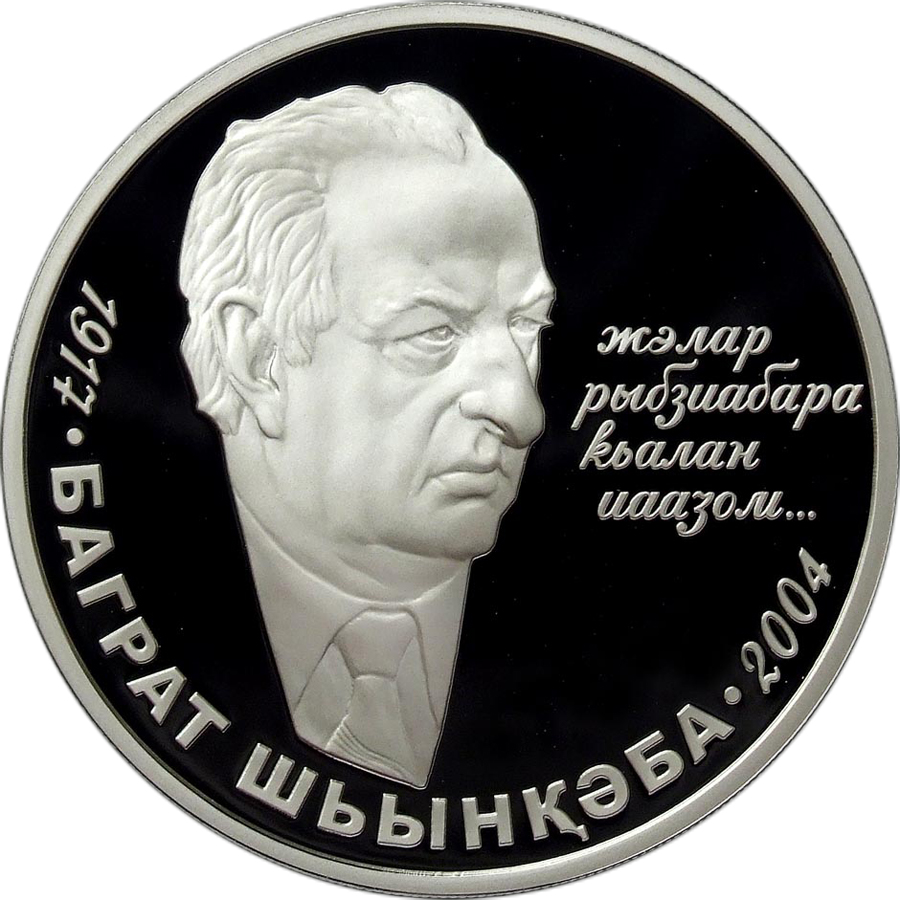
Reverse side of a 10 apsar commemorative coin minted in 2009 featuring Bagrat Shinkuba

== Works ==
- Bagrat Shinkuba. The Last of the Departed on Adyghe Library
- Иалкаау иоымтакуа, т. 1–2, Akya, 1967–68; в рус. пер. — Избранное. [Предисл. К. Симонова], М., 1976.

== Bibliography ==
- Цвинариа В. Л., Творчество Б. В. Шинкуба, Тб., 1970 (in Russian).
