= Microgen =

Pharmaceutical company in Russia

- Native name: ФГУП «НПО «Микроген»
- Company type: Unitary enterprise (FGUP)
- Industry: pharmaceutical industry
- Founded: 2003
- Headquarters: Moscow, Russia
- Key people: Peter Kanygin (director-general)
- Products: immunobiological products
- Revenue: ▲RUB 7.6 bln. (2013); RUB 5.1 bln. (2012)
- Net income: ▲RUB 1 bln. (2013)
- Number of employees: 6000
- Parent: Rostec
- Website: www.microgen.ru

Microgen (Russian: Микроген) is Russia's largest producer of immunobiological products, one of the three largest pharmaceutical companies in Russia.

According to the Russian Minister of Health, Veronika Skvortsova, Microgen is of strategic importance for Russia's national security.

== History ==
The Scientific and Production Association Microgen was established in May 2003 as a result of the merger of state-owned enterprises producing medical immunobiological products and other medical drugs. Following a decision of the Russian Government, the association was created "to provide for the country's needs for preventive, diagnostic and therapeutic immunobiological preparations".

In 2006, Microgen started shipping its combined vaccines against whooping cough, diphtheria, tetanus and hepatitis B, as well as against tetanus, diphtheria and hepatitis B (DTP-Hep B, Hepatitis-Td).

In 2010, Microgen began production of an improved formula for dry live influenza vaccine "Ultravak".

In 2011, the company received the first samples of bacteriophage preparation against the pathogen Acinetobacter, which is the causative agent of a large number of hospital-acquired (nosocomial) infections and is resistant to antibiotics. Microgen started testing a new anti-tick vaccine for children. In 2011, Microgen supplied more than 60 million doses of vaccines to the various regions of Russia, including BCG (tuberculosis), Grippol, DTP (diphtheria, tetanus), measles and rubella, as well as more than 12 million doses of influenza vaccine.

In 2012, Microgen began preparations for the transition to the International Standards of Pharmaceutical Manufacturing (GMP). In the same year, the company delivered more than two million packages of bacteriophages and 19 million doses of influenza vaccine.

In 2013, in addition to the existing vaccine against avian influenza (strain H5N1), Microgen initiated the development of pre-pandemic "Chinese flu" vaccine (strain H7N9). Peter Kanygin, formerly Head of a Rostec structure, was appointed as the director-general of the company. The association's net income has reached 1 bln. rubel.

In March 2014 the company announced the development of a new generation of vaccines against tick-borne encephalitis based on continuous cell lines. In April 2014, Microgen announced the launch of clinical trials of the new combined penta-vaccine aDTB-HepB-Hib (diphtheria, pertussis, tetanus, hepatitis B, and infections caused by Haemophilus influenzae).

== Structure and management ==
Microgen is a Russian state company. Because of the special status of the company, its work is controlled personally by the Prime Minister of Russia.

General Director – Peter Kanygin.

In 2014, Microgen united nine operating companies located in 9 cities across Russia. Its major production sites are located in Stavropol, Irkutsk, Nizhny Novgorod ("ImBio"), Moscow, Tomsk ("Virion"), Perm ("Biomed") and Ufa ("Immunopreparat").

The company has a staff of more than 6,000 people.

Since March 1, 2019, the sole executive body of NPO Microgen JSC has been Nacimbio JSC. In 2021, the Rostec State Corporation transferred 100% of the shares of NPO Microgen to the Nacimbio holding

== Production ==
The company produces more than 70% of the total Russian immunobiological products, including two of the four vaccines against A/H1N1. Microgen also has a monopoly on the production of a number of other vaccines. In 2013, the company controlled 23% of the Russian market of medicines from donated blood plasma. The company supplies 70% of vaccines and toxoids included in the National Immunisation Calendar of Russia.

Microgen produces a range of over 120 immunobiological products: vaccines, sera, specific and polyvalent immunoglobulins, nutrient medium, allergens, probiotics etc. Of these, 60 products are included in the Russian list of vital and essential medicines.

Microgen is the only enterprise in Russia producing bacteriophages on an industrial scale.

Its medical drugs and products are exported to Kazakhstan, Ukraine, Belarus, Uzbekistan, Azerbaijan, Armenia, Georgia, Mexico, Mongolia, Vietnam and India.

== Research ==
The company is developing more than 15 products, including a new version of influenza vaccine, tissue culture vaccines against varicella, rabies, tick-borne encephalitis, combined vaccines DTP-HepB-Hib, HepB-aDTP-Hib and MMR (measles, mumps and rubella) and complex preparations of bacteriophages, etc.

Microgen is involved in several international research projects, including the WHO program to combat smallpox, measles, rubella, tuberculosis, avian influenza, etc.

Since 2013, Microgen has been involved in the development of a new drug for the treatment of leukaemia and other antitumor drugs.

In 2014, the company announced the launch of clinical trials of the drug "Relatoks" (botulinum toxin type A – haemagglutinin complex) in paediatric neurology

The research projects of the company involve over 130 PhD Candidates and more than 30 Doctors of Science.

Microgen is among the ten most innovative companies in Russia, according to RBC Group ratings.

== Finance ==
The company's 2013 revenue amounted to RUB 7.6 bln., net profit - RUB 1 bln. In 2012, the company was the fifth largest in terms of revenue among all Russian pharmaceutical manufacturers.

On the basis of 2012 results, the DSM Group analysts estimated the company's overall turnover at RUB 5.1 bln. One of the company's branches ("Virion", Tomsk) in 2013 supplied RUB 950 mln. worth of products.

In 2012 the company completed 43 State contracts, totalling more than RUB 1.8 bln.

In 2011, revenues from exports reached RUB 500 mln.

The same year, Microgen has spent close to RUB 2 bln. of its own funds on the construction of 2 pharmaceutical plants and a laboratory. By 2018 the company plans to spend RUB 17 bln. on the modernisation of its production processes.

In 2014, Russia's VTB Bank extended a credit line for the FSUE SPA Microgen to the amount of RUB 2 bln., for a period of 3 years.

The company is state-owned, but does not receive subsidies from the State budget.
