= Samson Chanba =

Abkhazian writer and statesman

Samson Kuagu-ipa Chanba
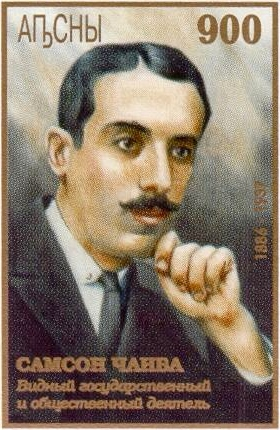
- Chanba on a 1997 Abkhazian stamp

People's Commissar for Education
- In office 1930–1932

Chairman of the Central Executive Committee of the SSR Abkhazia
- In office 1925–1930
- Succeeded by: Nestor Lakoba

People's Commissar for Education
- In office 1921–1925

Personal details
- Born: 18 June 1886 Atara
- Died: 1937 (aged 50–51)
- Party: Communist Party of Abkhazia

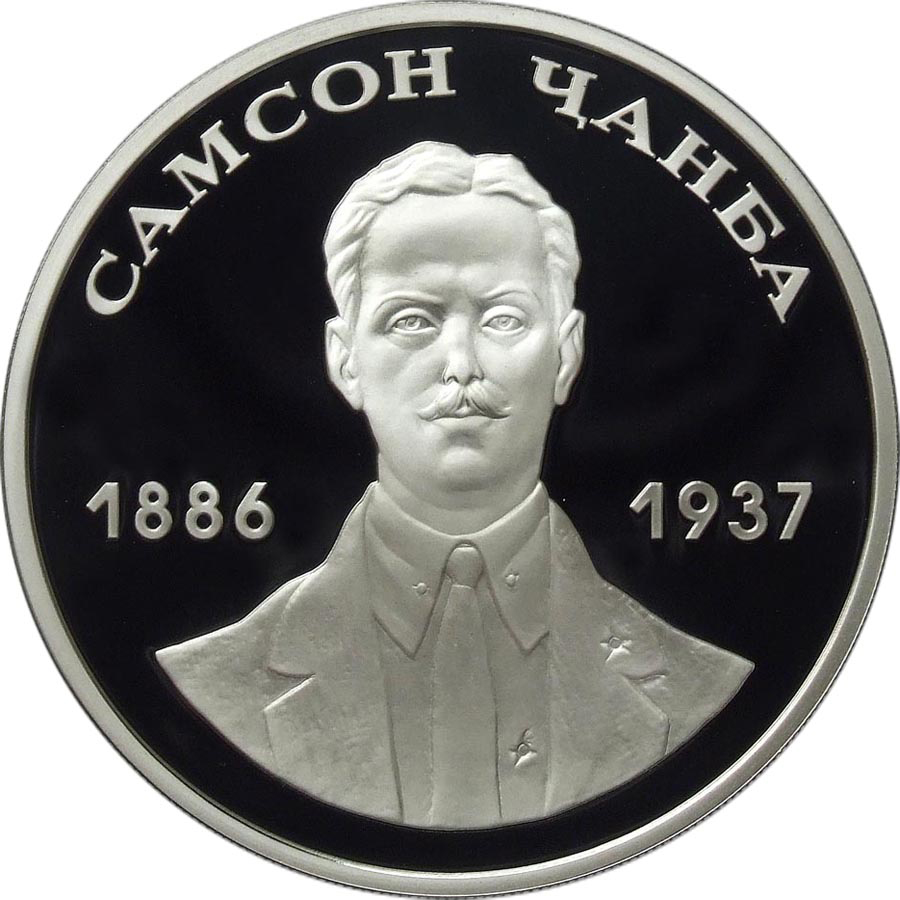
Reverse side of a 10 apsar commemorative coin minted in 2009 featuring Samson Chanba

Samson Kuagu-ipa Chanba (Abkhaz: Самсон Кәагә-иԥа Ҷанба; 18 June 1886 – 1937) was a pioneering writer and statesman from Abkhazia killed in Joseph Stalin's Great Purge.

Chanba was born on 18 June 1886 in the village of Atara. He initially became a teacher. In 1919 he published the poem Daughter of the Mountains, and in 1920 the play Amkhadzyr, the first play written in the Abkhaz language.

After the October Revolution, Chanba became active in politics. In 1921 Chanba joined the Communist Party and he became co-editor (with M. Khashba) of the newspaper Red Abkhazia and the People's Commissar for Education of the SSR Abkhazia. In 1925 Chanba became the Chairman of the Central Executive Committee of the SSR Abkhazia, and from 1930 to 1932 he returned to his position of People's Commissar for Education. From 1932 until 1937 Chanba was a fellow at the Abkhazian Institute for Language, Literature and History and from 1935 until 1937 Chairman of the Writers' Union of Abkhazia.

In 1937 Chanba was arrested and subsequently shot in Stalin's Great Purge.
