= Moscow Mint =

Mint in Moscow, Russia

Coordinates: 55°42′44″N 37°37′29″E

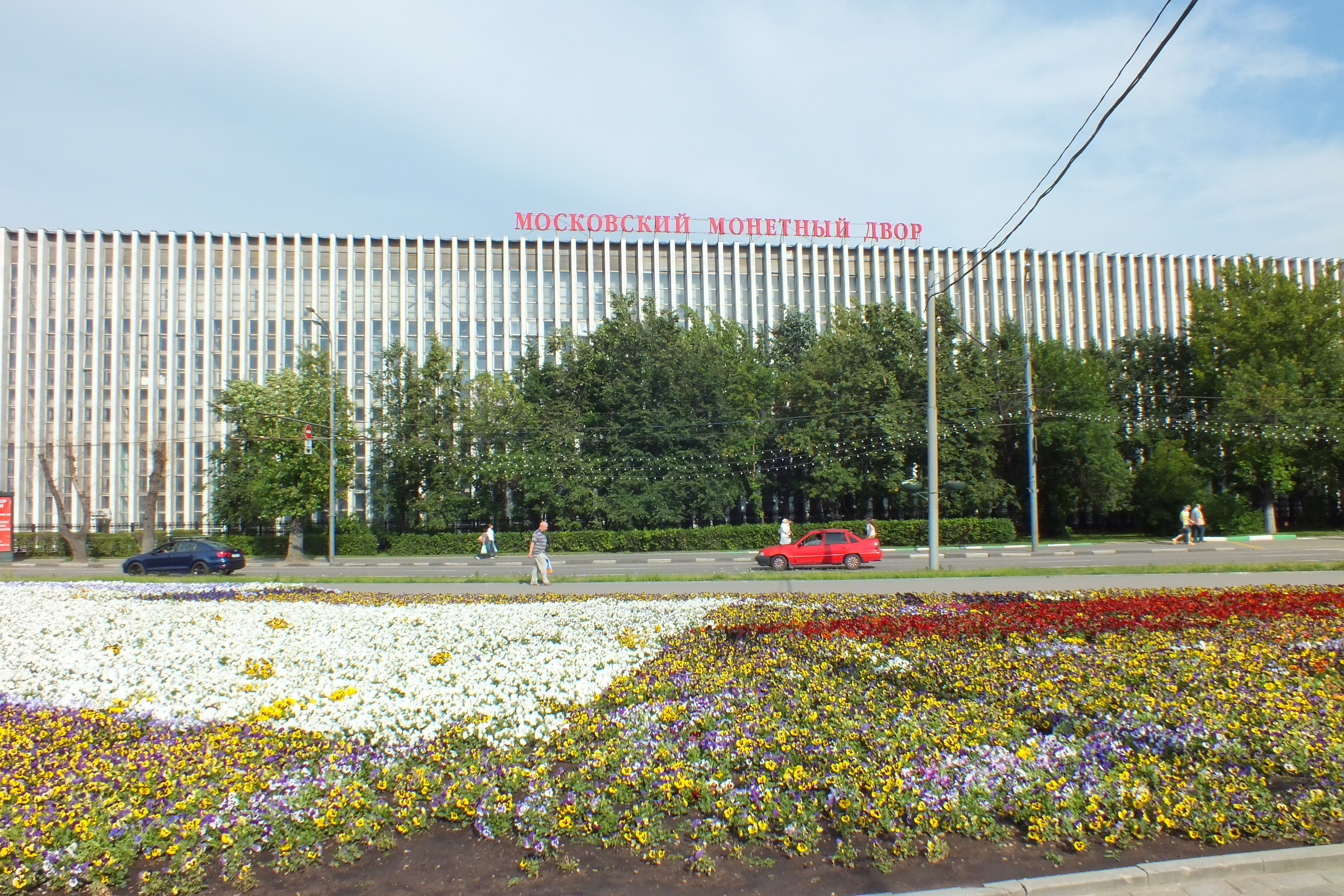
Moscow Mint, 2014

Moscow Mint (Russian: Московский монетный двор, romanized: Moskovskiy monetnyy dvor) is a mint in Russia engaged in manufacturing of coins, medals and decorations. It also takes orders for minting coins for foreign countries. For example, the Moscow Mint produced the coins for Abkhazia, the Abkhazian apsar and many of the coins of India. The mint fills individual orders for the manufacture of badges, medals and tokens.

The history of coinage in Moscow dates back several centuries, but the date of the founding of the modern enterprise is considered to be 25 April 1942. The Moscow Mint is part of the federal unitary enterprise, Goznak.
