= HSM =

HSM or H.S.M. may refer to:

== Entertainment ==
- High School Musical (disambiguation)

== Organisations ==
- Harakat al-Shabaab Mujahedeen or Al-Shabaab, a Somali insurgent group
- Hollandsche IJzeren Spoorweg-Maatschappij, a former Netherlands railway
- Holy Spirit Movement, Uganda
- HSM (company), an American company (previously Hickory Springs)

== Science and technology ==
- Hardware security module, a physical computing device
- Hepatosplenomegaly, enlargement of the liver and the spleen
- Hierarchical Storage Manager, an IBM program Product for MVS and a component of Data Facility Storage Management Subsystem/MVS
- Hierarchical storage management, in data storage
- Hierarchical state machine, in computer science
- Hyper Sonic Motor, Sigma ultrasonic motor lens focusing technology

== Other uses ==
- Historic Sites and Monuments in Antarctica
- Horsham Airport, Australia, by IATA code
- Humanitarian Service Medal, a U.S. military award

== See also ==
- HMS (disambiguation)
