= Heavy melting steel =

Recyclable steel and iron designation

Heavy melting steel (HMS) or heavy melting scrap is a designation for recyclable steel and wrought iron. It is broken up into two major categories: HMS 1 and HMS 2, where HMS 1 does not contain galvanized and blackened steel, whereas HMS 2 does. The Institute of Scrap Recycling Industries breaks up the categories further:

- ISRI 200 (HMS 1): Wrought iron or steel scrap 1/4 inch (6.35 mm) and larger in thickness. All pieces must be smaller than 60 in × 24 in (1,524 mm × 610 mm)
- ISRI 201 (HMS 1): Same as ISRI 200 except pieces must be smaller than 36 in × 18 in (914 mm × 457 mm).
- ISRI 202 (HMS 1): Same as ISRI 200 except pieces must be smaller than 60 in × 18 in (1,524 mm × 457 mm).
- ISRI 203 (HMS 2): Wrought iron or steel scrap, black and galvanized, 1/8 inch (3.175 mm) and larger in thickness.
- ISRI 204 (HMS 2): Same as ISRI 203 except pieces must be smaller than 36 in × 18 in (914 mm × 457 mm).
- ISRI 205 (HMS 2): Same as ISRI 204 except it may contain automotive scrap except for thin gauge material.
- ISRI 206 (HMS 2): Same as ISRI 205 except pieces must be smaller than 60 in × 18 in (1,524 mm × 457 mm).

HMS 1 and 2 are widely traded, particularly in the western hemisphere.

Both HMS 1 and 2 comprise obsolete scrap only - iron and steel recovered from items demolished or dismantled at the end of their life.

HMS 1 is the term for heavier scrap which has a density of at least 0.7 tons per cubic meter, whereas HMS 2 would be lighter steel scrap

Because both grades guarantee a minimum piece thickness – at least 1/4 inch (6.35 mm) for HMS 1, and 1/8 inch (3.175 mm) for HMS 2 – consignments have a high density. Both also have defined maximum dimensions (usually 60 in × 24 in or 1,524 mm × 610 mm), and should be prepared to facilitate handling and charging to a furnace.

This density, sizing and preparation makes for efficient furnace operation by minimising the time to charge enough scrap for a full melt. In contrast, thin mixed scrap greatly increases charging time, cutting furnace productivity.

Variations on maximum piece size are covered by ISRI (North America’s Institute of Scrap Recycling Industries) codes. HMS is usually traded as a blend of 1 and 2, either a premium blend (80:20) or lower grade mixes (70:30) and (60:40). Other major heavy scrap grades include Japan’s H2 and A3 from the CIS.
