= Goznak =

Russian joint-stock company

JSC Goznak
- Native name: АО «Гознак»
- Type: Joint-stock company
- Industry: Research, development, currency printing
- Founded: 1818 (as Expedition of Storing State Papers); 1919 (as Goznak)
- Headquarters: 17 Mytnaya Street, Moscow, Russia
- Key people: Arkady V. Trachuk (director-general)
- Products: Currency, postal stamps, medals, badges, coins, banknotes
- Revenue: 38,799,700,000 Russian ruble (2017)
- Owner: Federal Government of Russia (100%)
- Parent: Ministry of Finance
- Website: goznak.ru

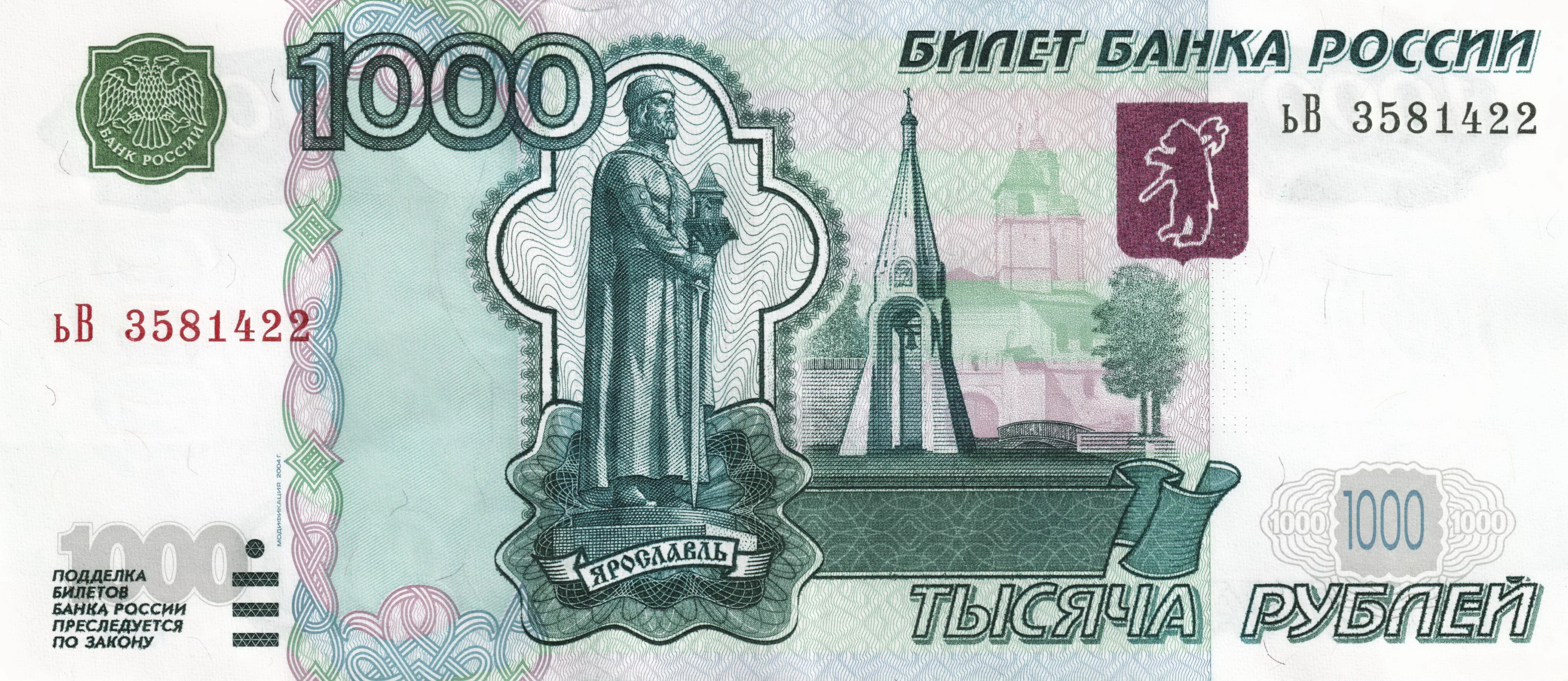
One thousand rubles of 2000-2004

Joint Stock Company "Goznak" (Russian: Гознак; short for Государственный знак, lit. 'State Insignia') is a Russian joint-stock company responsible for research and development as well as manufacturing security products including banknotes, coins, stamps, identity cards, secure documents, state orders and medals, as well as providing secure services. It incorporates seven factories and one research and development institute involved in different stages of the development, research, and manufacturing cycle.

Goznak combines paper and printing facilities which manufacture banknotes, government bonds, checks, letters of credit, savings-bank books (сберегательная книжка), lottery tickets, postage stamps, blanks of passports, birth certificates, marriage licenses, as well as publications of high artistic value and special and high-grade paper.

Goznak also controls mints, which manufacture circulation coins, orders, decorations, and commemorative medals. It also manufactures credit cards, banking cards, and phone cards. Goznak not only prints Russian money, but also prints banknotes of foreign countries, including Lebanon, Yemen, Guatemala, Rwanda, Angola and others.

== History ==
During the reign of Peter the Great, the Russians established the Saint Petersburg Mint in 1724, which would centralize coinage in Russia and begin to produce different kinds of badges and medals used for decoration.

In 1818, on 4 September (21 August Old Style) in Saint-Petersburg, the Expedition of Storing State Papers (Экспедиция заготовления государственных бумаг) was founded by the Decree of Emperor Alexander I under the authority of the Ministry of Finance; Dmitry Guriev, Minister of Finance, assigned engineer Agustín de Betancourt to design and build the modern, steam-powered currency printshop.

In 1838, a Prussian-born academician Moritz von Jacobi, employed at this Department, used his invention of galvanoplastics to produce printing plates for the first time in printing history. In the 1890s, an employee of the Department Ivan Orlov (ru) invented and developed a new printing method called "Orlov's printing" (Орловская печать). Also, he built multicolor printing presses, which would serve as a prototype for modern multicolor printing presses. Orlov's machines were still in use in some countries in the 1970s.

After the October Revolution of 1917, the Department of State Currency Production was reorganized and renamed Goznak (short for Государственный знак, literally State Ensign or Insignia) in 1919. Although the initial scope of Goznak had been the production of bank notes, the production of coins was added to its field of operation in 1941, when the Leningrad mint was taken over by Goznak. Goznak had its own All-union Research Institute in Moscow. In the 1920s, a Goznak employee and a prominent Soviet sculptor Ivan Shadr created the first samples of Soviet money. In the 1950s–1960s, an employee of the Goznak Moscow Printing Factory V.A. Oleynik invented an original money counting device, which would be further developed by other workers of the All-Union Research Institute. Thus, all of the paper and printing factories and mints of the Goznak were equipped with the counting machines.

After the revolution of 1917 the Saint-Petersburg Mint of Goznak was renamed into the Leningrad Mint. Its original name was returned in the 1990s. The Saint-Petersburg Paper Mill of Goznak was also called the Leningrad Paper Mill during the Soviet period.

In 1997, Perm Printing Factory launched telecards for public telephones. During the first year of the new site more than one million cards were produced. The quality of cards is fully in line with the international standard.

In 1999, the Moscow Mint, for the first time in the history of Russia won the tender for the manufacture of currency for India. In October 1999, they signed an agreement with India for the manufacture of copper-nickel coins two and five rupees.

In 2006 the Association of the State Companies "Goznak" was transformed into the Federal State Unitary Enterprise "Goznak". Goznak includes 8 branches: 2 Printing Factories, 2 Paper Mills, 2 Mints, Printing House and R&D Institute.

At the beginning of 2006, the Moscow Printing Factory of Goznak started with the personalization of the first ePassport. The personalization center is capable of processing of more than 5 million passports per year. The personalization of the new generation of passports with the electronic data carrier is carried by laser engraving at the Branches of Goznak – at the Main Personalization Center at the Moscow Printing Factory and at the Multifunctional Personalization Center at the Moscow Printing Works.

On 3 March 2008 Goznak has become a strategic enterprise of Russia.

On 5 June 2014 the Russian President Putin signed a decree on the transformation of the company from the status of Federal State Unitary Enterprise to Open Joint Stock Company "Goznak", 100% of which is owned by the federal government.

In September 2022, after the 2022 annexation referendums in Russian-occupied Ukraine, Goznak was included in the next sanctions list of the British government. The company was accused of producing blank Russian passports for citizens of Ukraine.

== Structure ==
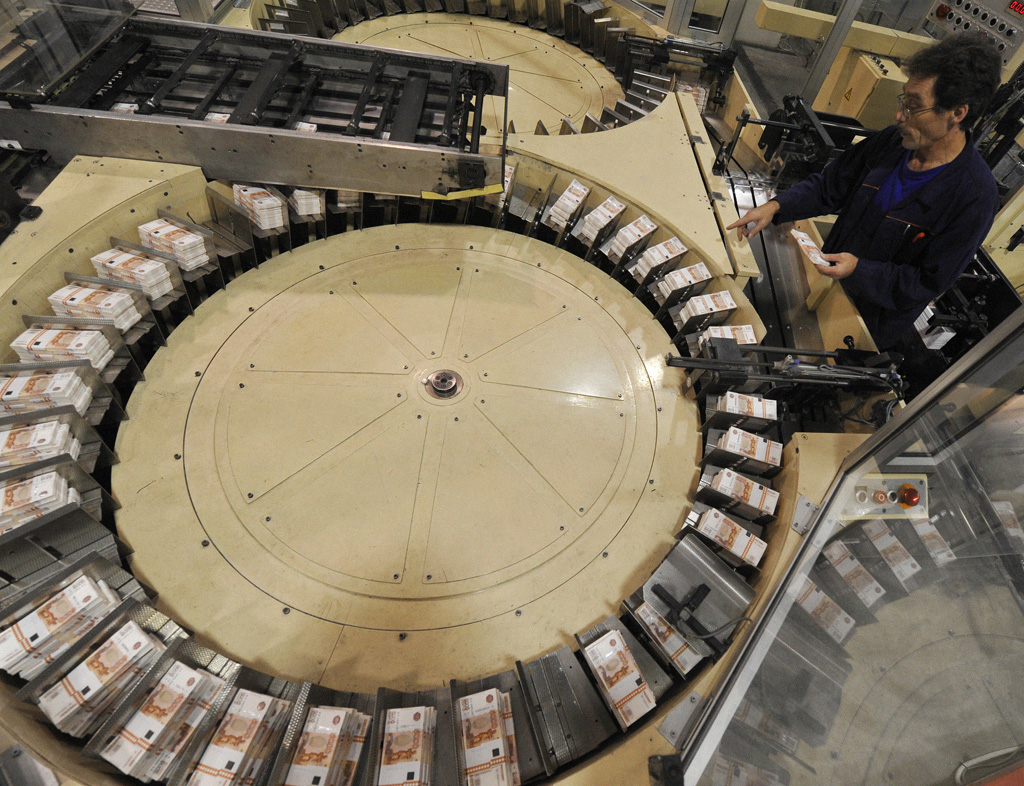
The printing of banknotes of 5000 rubles at the factory of FSUE Goznak in Perm

JSC "Goznak" incorporates eight branches:

- Moscow Mint
- Perm Printing Factory
- Saint Petersburg Paper Mill
- Saint Petersburg Mint
- Moscow Printing Factory
- Research Institute of Goznak (Moscow)
- Krasnokamsk Paper Mill
- Moscow Printing Works

== Memory ==
In honor of the 175th anniversary of the foundation of Goznak, a postage stamp of Russia was issued (1993), and by the 190th anniversary of the enterprise, a postal block and a commemorative coin of the Bank of Russia (2008) was issued. On 30 July 2018, the Bank of Russia issued commemorative silver coins in denominations of 3 rubles and 25 rubles of series "200 years since the founding of the Expedition of the Preparation of State Papers".

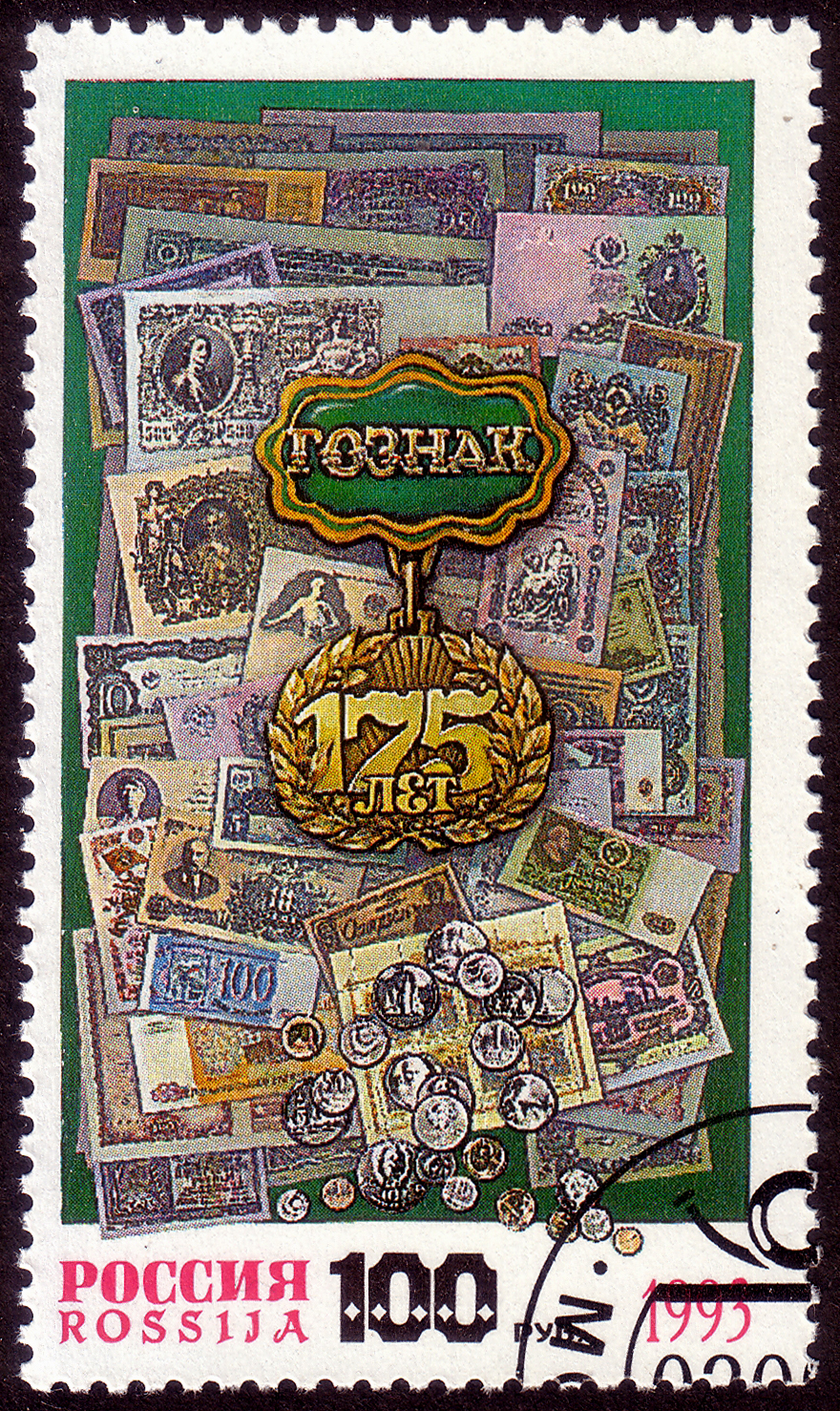
Postage stamp of Russia, dedicated to the 175th anniversary of Goznak (1993).

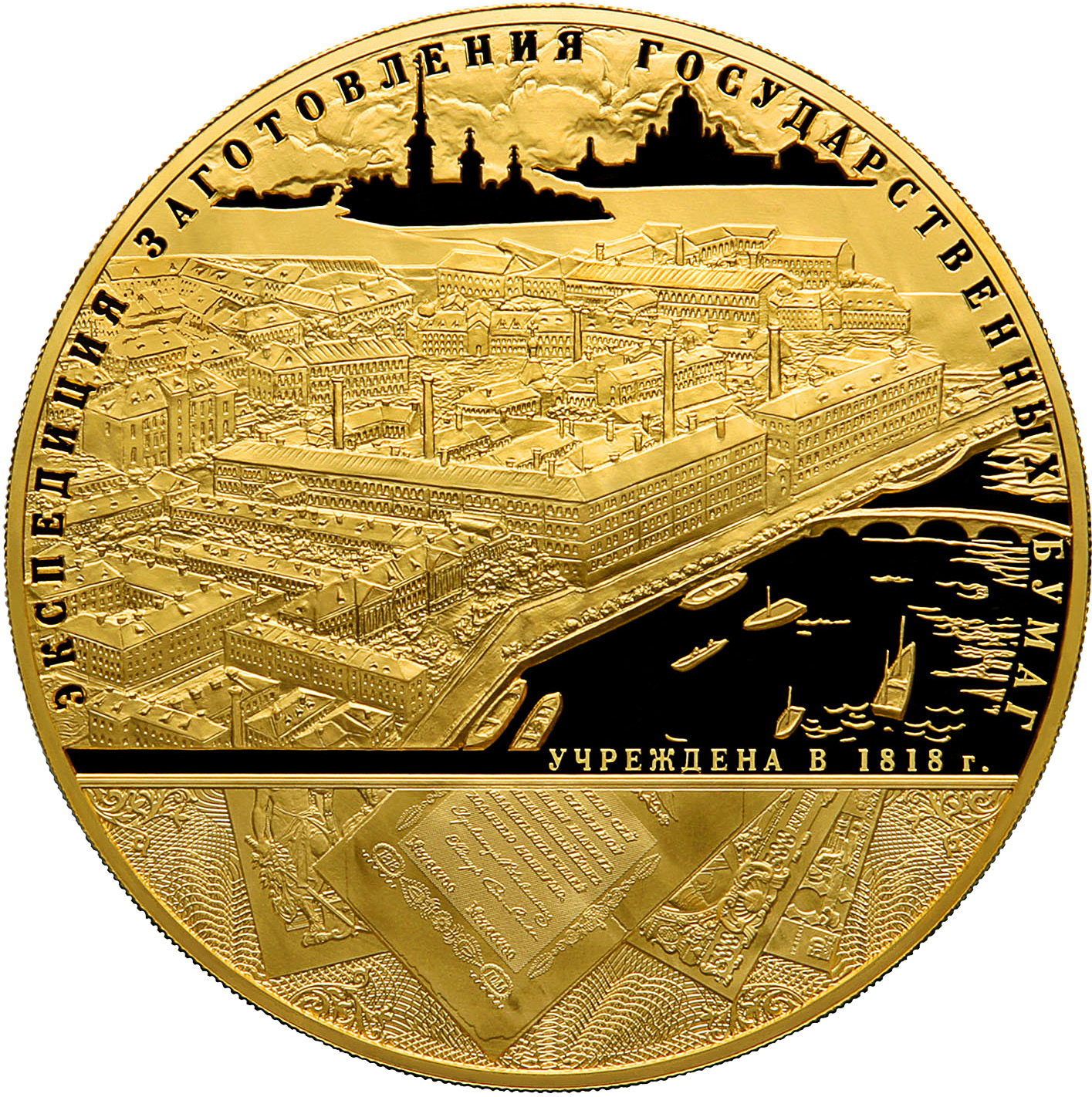
Commemorative coin of the Bank of Russia – the 190th anniversary of the Federal State Unitary Enterprise "Goznak", 25,000 rubles, 3 kg of pure gold (2008).

== Interesting facts ==
In 1924, the Goznak collection was successfully demonstrated in the official class of the First All-Union Philatelic Exhibition in Moscow.
