= Novosibirskenergo =

- Company type: Joint-stock company
- Founded: 2004
- Defunct: 2015
- Successor: Siberian Energy Company (SIBEKO)
- Headquarters: Novosibirsk, Russia
- Revenue: 27,330,900,000 Russian ruble (2017)
- Website: nske.ru

OJSC Novosibirskenergo (TGK-11; Russian: ОАО Новосибирскэнерго) was an electric power generation, transfer and distribution company located in Novosibirsk Oblast.

== Overview ==
As of 2007, the company has 6 electric power stations, with a total installed electric capacity of 2,977 MW. Most of them run on coal, gas or oil. The largest station is TPP-5, which had its first unit launched in 1985; it has a capacity of 1,200 MW. The company also runs the Novosibirsk Hydroelectric Station with an installed capacity of 455 MW. Its first unit was launched in 1957.

Revenue in 2007 was RUB 21,875.00 million, while operating profit was RUB 2,819.00 million.

The company was created in 1993 as part of the privatization of Russia's energy system. It has 14,067 employees. Its headquarters are located in the city Novosibirsk in Novosibirsk Oblast. The company is controlled by Mikhail Abyzov.

The company stopped generating energy in 2011, with its power plants ending up with Sibeko. Novosibirskenergo was liquidated in December 2015.
