= Hybrid Management Sub-Layer =

The SCTE Hybrid Management Sub-Layer (HMS) refers to a set of specifications intended to support the design and implementation of inter-operable management systems for evolving HFC cable networks.

The HMS Physical (PHY) Layer Specification describes the physical layer portion of the protocol stack used for communication between HMS-compliant transponders interfacing to manage outside plant network elements (NE) and a centralized headend element (HE).

The HMS Media Access Control (MAC) Layer Specification describes the messaging and protocols implemented at the Data Link Layer (DLL), Layer 2 in the 7-layer ISO-OSI reference model, that support reliable and efficient communications between HMS-compliant transponders interfacing to managed outside plant (OSP) network elements (NEs) and a centralized headend element (HE).
