= HMS Networks =

International software company

HMS Networks AB
- Type: Aktiebolag
- Traded as: Nasdaq Stockholm: HMS
- ISIN: SE0009997018
- Industry: Technology industry
- Founded: 1988; 38 years ago Halmstad, Sweden
- Headquarters: Halmstad, Sweden
- Key people: Staffan Dahlström, CEO; Charlotte Brogren, Chairman; Joakim Nideborn, CFO
- Products: Anybus, Ewon, Intesis, Ixxat
- Revenue: 268 million EUR (2024)
- Number of employees: 1100 (2025)
- Website: hms-networks.com

HMS Networks AB is an international company in the field of Industrial Information and Communication Technology (Industrial ICT). HMS is headquartered in Halmstad, Sweden and is listed on the Nasdaq Nordic stock exchange, employing 1100 people with reported sales of 268 million Euro in 2024. HMS stands for "Hardware Meets Software" referring to the fact that HMS products allow industrial hardware to be connected to IoT software.

== Products ==
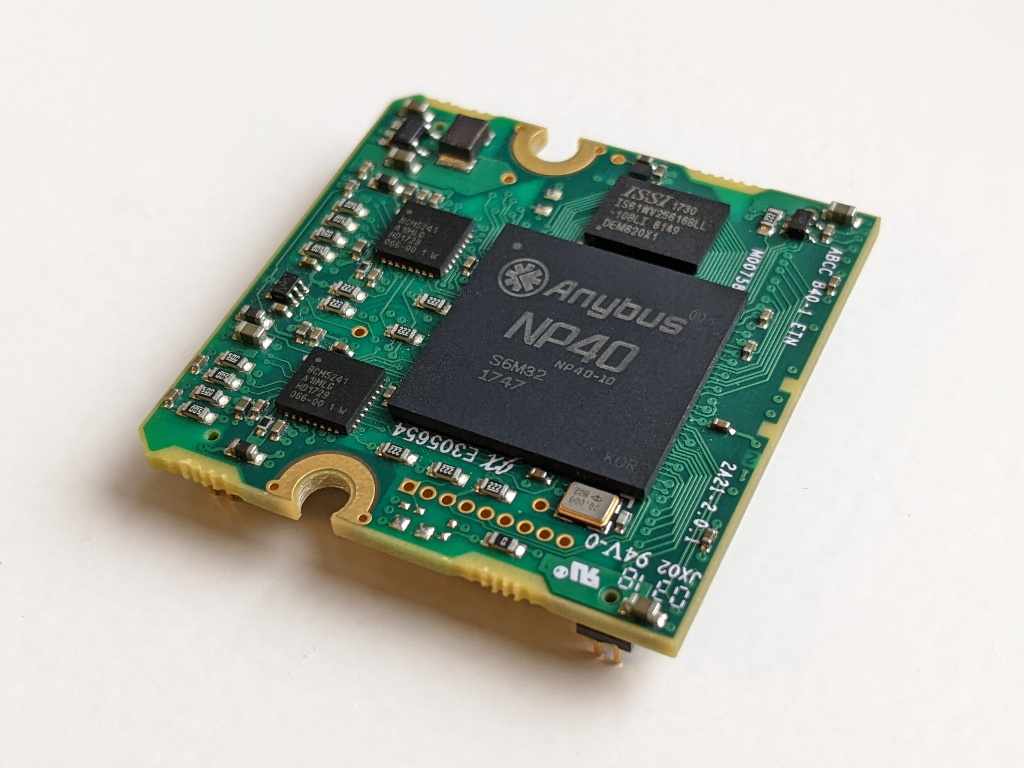
Anybus CompactCom B40

HMS manufactures and markets industrial communication products that connect industrial devices to different industrial networks and IoT systems. HMS products act as translators between robots, control systems, motors, sensors, etc. and the different industrial networks that exists in the market (fieldbuses and Industrial Ethernet). HMS also offers a portfolio of Wireless products as well as remote solutions for web-based control of field equipment such as PLCs, electric generators, machines, telecommunication base stations, building management systems and the likes.

HMS markets products under the following brands:

- Anybus. Multi-network connectivity within fieldbus and industrial Ethernet. With Anybus, one can connect any industrial device to any industrial network. Wired or wireless.
- Ixxat. Connectivity solutions for embedded control, energy and automotive testing. Ixxat products enable communication inside machines and between components in various industrial fields.
- Ewon. Remote access and management of industrial equipment. With Ewon, one can monitor and control field equipment and machinery online.
- Intesis. communication solutions for building automation.

== Organization and history ==
HMS has operations in: Sweden (Halmstad), Germany (Karlsruhe, Ravensburg, Wetzlar, Buchen), Belgium (Nivelles), Spain (Igualada, Barcelona), United States (Chicago, Boston), China (Beijing), Japan (Yokohama), The Netherlands (Hedel, Rotterdam), Italy (Milan, Brescia), France (Mulhouse), Romania (Sibiu), UK (Coventry, Singapore, UAE (Dubai), South Korea (Seoul), India (Pune), Vietnam (Ho Chi Minh City). In addition, distributors in 50 countries resell the HMS products on local markets.

HMS was founded in 1988 by Nicolas Hassbjer and has been deemed "Export Company of the Year" by the Swedish Trade Council.

- Product development of Anybus products is handled by the Industrial Network Technology Division in Halmstad, Sweden.
- Product development of Ixxat products is handled by the Vehicle Communication sub-division in Ravensburg, Germany.
- Product development of Ewon products handled by the Industrial Data Solutions Division in Nivelles, Belgium.
- Product development of Intesis products handled by the Building Automation sub-division in Igualada, Spain.
- Manufacturing takes place in Sweden, US, Latvia and China.

In January 2024 HMS acquired the US-company for industrial automation and networking solutions Red Lion Controls.
