= Saint Petersburg Mint =

Mint in Saint Petersburg, Russia

Coordinates: 59°56′59″N 30°18′53″E

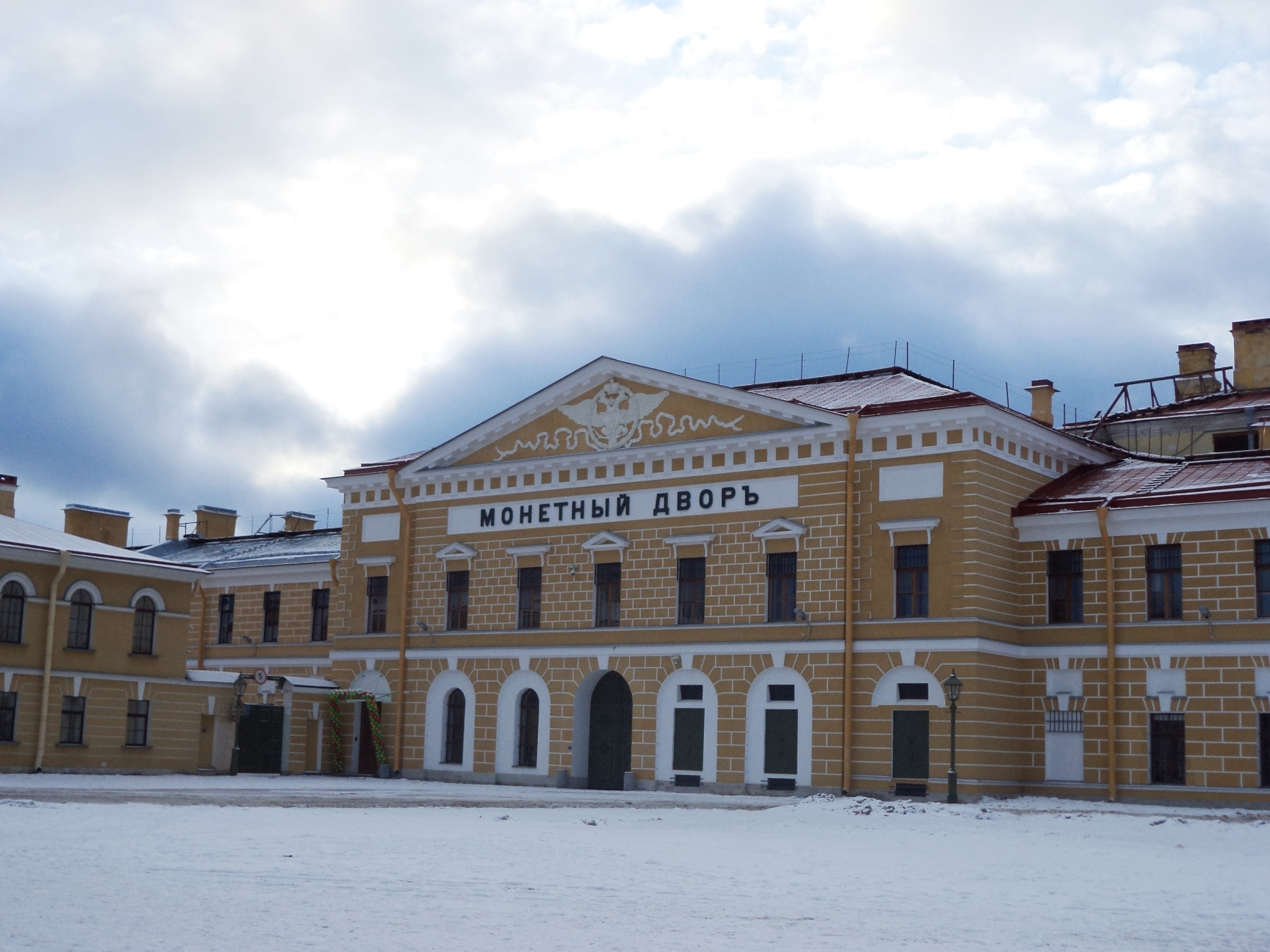
- Industry: Metalworking
- Founded: 1724; 302 years ago
- Headquarters: Saint Petersburg, Russia
- Area served: Russia
- Products: coins
- Parent: Goznak

Saint Petersburg Mint (Russian: Санкт-Петербу́ргский моне́тный двор) is one of the world's largest mints. It was founded by Peter the Great in 1724 on the territory of the Peter and Paul Fortress, so it is one of the oldest industrial enterprises in Saint Petersburg.

It is a part of the Goznak state-owned corporation.
