= HMS Group =

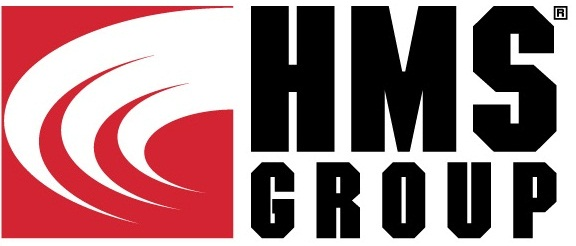
- Company type: Public
- Traded as: MOEX (HMSG)
- Industry: Industrial equipment engineering and manufacturing
- Founded: 1993
- Headquarters: Moscow, Russia
- Products: Pumps, compressors, oil & gas equipment
- Revenue: $761 million (2017)
- Operating income: $78.1 million (2017)
- Net income: $35.5 million (2017)
- Total assets: $829 million (2017)
- Total equity: $22 million (2017)
- Number of employees: 11,000 (2024)

The HMS Group is a diversified machine-building and engineering holding company, a manufacturer of pumps, compressors, and oil & gas equipment which production and engineering assets are located in Russia and abroad.

The company's headquarters are located in Moscow, Russia.

== Main business activities ==
Engineering, manufacturing, and complex procurement of the following products and related services:

- Pumps, pumping systems, and pumping stations
- Compressors, gas compression systems, and compressor stations
- Skid-mounted and modular oil & gas field equipment
- Oil & gas processing technologies

== Company structure ==
HMS Group is a joint-stock company established and operated in accordance with the legislation of the Russian Federation with subordinate enterprises located in Russia and Belarus.

- HMS Group structure:
  - Industrial pumps division
    - HMS Livgidromash, Russia
    - Livnynasos, Russia
    - Promburvod, Belarus
    - Bobruisk Machine Building Plant, Belarus
    - Hydromashservice (integrated commercial company of HMS Group), Russia
    - Dimitrovgradhimmash, Russia
    - Nizhnevartovskremservice, Russia
  - Oil & gas equipment and solutions business unit
    - HMS Neftemash, Russia
    - Sibneftemash, Russia
    - Sibnefteavtomatika, Russia
    - Giprotyumenneftegaz, Russia
  - Tomskgazstroy, Russia
  - HMS Compressors business unit
    - Kazancompressormash, Russia
    - NIIturbokompressor, Russia
  - Oil & gas processing technologies business unit
    - HMS Processing Technologies, Russia

HMS Group is a member of the Russian Union of Industrialists and Entrepreneurs (RSPP), the Russian Engineering Union, the Russian Pump Manufacturers Association, the Union of Oil and Gas Equipment Producers, the New Gas Industry Technology Association of Equipment Manufacturers.

== Company history ==
Hydromashservice, the bedrock of HMS Group, was founded in 1993. The main business was focused on supply pumps and systems to CIS countries (Ukraine, Belarus, Moldova, and Kyrgyzstan) and Russia.

By 1995 Hydromashservice had expanded and entered CIS markets and soon become one of the leaders specializing in the supplying pumps and systems for oil & gas, power, water and utilities.

Since 2003 Hydromashservice has been growing by organic growth coupled with active merging and acquiring pump and oilfield skid mounted equipment manufacturers, R&D and engineering companies as well as servicing and EPC companies:

- 2003 – Livgidromash (since 07.07.2014 – HMS Livgidromash) joined the Group
- 2004 – Acquisition of HMS Neftemash (before 26.08.2010 – Neftemash)
- 2006 – Nizhnevartovskremservice was acquired
- 2007 – Takeover of Tomskgazstroy, Dimitrovgradhimmash
- 2008 – Promburvod (Minsk, Belarus)
- 2009 – Sibnefteavtomatika was acquired
- 2010 – Giprotyumenneftegaz became part of the Group
- 2011 – Sibneftemash, joined the Group and Bobruysk Machine Building Plant,
- 2012 – Kazancompressormash, Russian compressor manufacturer,
- 2013 – NIIturbokompressor was acquired
