= Prodo =

Russian producer of food products

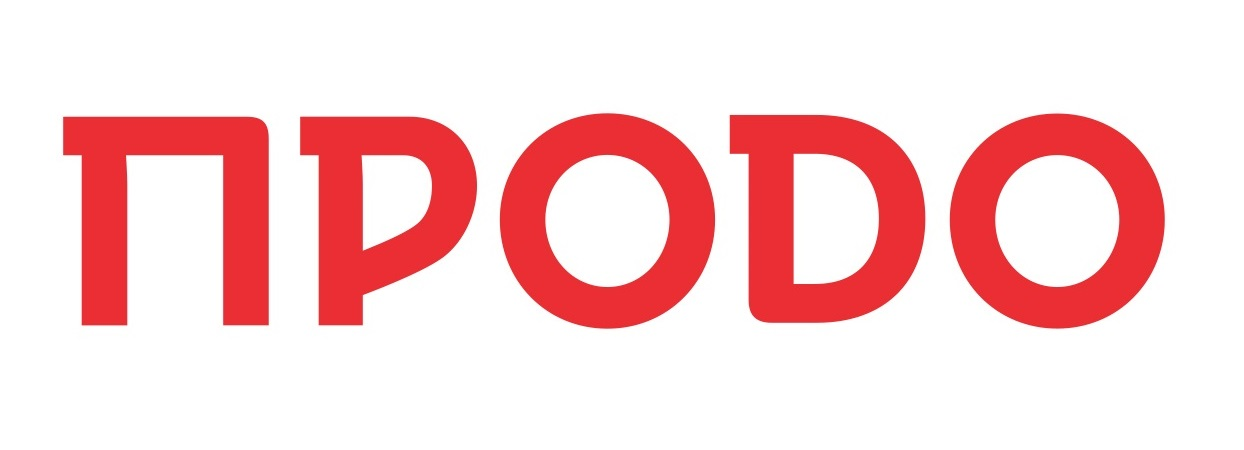
- Industry: FMCG
- Founded: 2004
- Headquarters: Moscow, Russia
- Key people: Vadim Dolgov (CEO)
- Products: Meat processing, poultry, crop production, feed, cereal
- Website: prodo.ru

Prodo (Russian: Продо) group is one of the biggest Russian producers of poultry and meat products, delicacies, as well as ready-to-cook products. The company was founded in 2004. The goods of our brands are sold in 65 regions of Russia. The headquarters is in Moscow.

The large scale of items is produced by 3 poultry farms and 3 meat-processing enterprises located in the Central, Siberian, Ural and Volga federal districts of Russia. All of them are the largest players in the local markets.

PRODO produces raw materials and corn for its enterprises.

PRODO business includes a full production cycle from the production of raw materials to the sale of ready products. Among popular brands are Klinsky, Omsky Bacon, Rococo, Troekurovo, Cherny Kaban, Yasnaya gorka, Khalif, etc.

The number of employees is 9 000.

== History ==
PRODO Group was founded in 2004.

In 2018 PRODO Group completed the modernization of PRODO Kaluga Poultry Farm, the total investment in the project was about 5 billion rubles. The planned capacity of the enterprise amounted to 63 thousand tons of broiler meat, a new hatchery with a capacity of 51.5 million eggs per year was launched. In the same year, the investment project at PRODO Tyumen broiler was completed. Total investments - 308 million rubles.

In 2019 PRODO Kaluga Poultry Farm achieved the indicator of chicken 148.11 for the initial load-bearing, becoming the owner of the gold certificate of the elite club of the international company Aviagen Ross-140. In the same year, the company held the grand opening of a new deep processing workshop for KFC, the production potential of the new workshop - up to 1000 tons of chicken products per month.

In 2019 the first stage of the investment program at Omsky Bacon (Luzino) was completed, within the framework of which three large facilities were constructed: a breeding reproductive in the village of Kalinino, Omsk region, for 1700 sows, an artificial insemination station in the village of Fadino and modernized areas of the Chunaevsky pig complex, designed for a one-time maintenance of 46 thousand animal heads.

In 2020, the Ministry of Agriculture of Russia included PRODO Group in the list of systemically forming enterprises.

== Management ==
• Vadim Dolgov, CEO of PRODO Group (since May 2021).
