= Yury Kovalchuk =

Russian oligarch (born 1951)

- Юрий Ковальчук
- Born: Yury Valentinovich Kovalchuk; 25 July 1951 (age 75); Leningrad, Russian SFSR, Soviet Union (now Saint Petersburg, Russia)
- Occupations: Chairman and largest shareholder, Rossiya Bank
- Known for: "Putin's personal banker"
- Relatives: Mikhail Kovalchuk (brother)
- Awards: Order of Friendship

Yury Valentinovich Kovalchuk (Russian: Ю́рий Валенти́нович Ковальчу́к; born 25 July 1951) is a Russian billionaire businessman and financier who is "reputed to be Vladimir Putin's personal banker". The Panama Papers leak revealed that Kovalchuk had transferred at least $1 billion to an offshore entity.

Kovalchuk is a close friend of Putin: he hosted the wedding of Putin's daughter Katerina Tikhonova to Kirill Shamalov at his ski resort, Igora, in 2013.

In 2022 journalist Mikhail Zygar said Kovalchuk could probably be called Number 2 in Russia. While self-isolating from COVID-19 in 2020, Putin spent much time with Kovalchuk, and they share the view that the only important factor is to restore Russian greatness. According to some experts, Kovalchuk played a role in Putin's decision to invade Ukraine in 2022.

== Life ==
Yuri Kovalchuk spent his childhood and youth in Leningrad. He was the second child in a family of history teachers. His father, Valentin Mikhailovich Kovalchuk, is Ukrainian, and his mother, Miriam Abramovna Kovalchuk (née Viro), is Jewish. His brother Mikhail is five years older than him.

From 1987 to 1991, he was the first deputy director of Ioffe Physico-Technical Institute.

In 1992, Kovalchuk was a founder of the STREAM Corporation (Russian: ЗАО "Корпорация "СТРИМ").

Kovalchuk is very closely associated with Vladimir Stolyarenko. (Note: From 1989 to 1995, the president and chairman of the board of Tokobank was Viktor Konstantinovich Yakunin (Russian: Виктор Константинович Якунин) who created Tokobank. On 28 April 1992 using DM 50 million from a "frozen" VEB account, Tokobank gained an 80.6% stake in Ost-West Handelsbank after the shareholders of Ost-West Handelsbank transferred the stake to Tokobank which was the first privatization of a former sovzagranbank (Russian: Совзагранбанк). In May 1998, members of the St. Petersburg "Northern Alliance" (Russian: «Северный Альянс») including Vladimir Stolyarenko, held temporary directorships of Tokobank (Russian: Токобанк). In 1998, Tokobank owned a 28% stake in the German bank Ost-West Handelsbank. In 1998, "Northern Alliance" (Russian: «Северный Альянс») associated with Saint Petersburg included directors and shareholders of Tokobank including Sudhir Gupta, owner of Amtel Tire Holding and controlled Yunicbank (Russian: Юникбанк), whose August 1998 head of the supervisory board was Stepan Kovalchuk (Russian: Степан Ковальчук), the chairman of the board of Flamingo Bank (Russian: банк «Фламинг»). Stepan Kovalchuk is a grand-nephew of Yuri Kovalchuk.)

Since the early 1990s, Kovalchuk has owned a dacha in Solovyovka in the Priozersky District of the Leningrad region, located on the eastern shore of the Komsomolskoye lake on the Karelian Isthmus near Saint Petersburg. His neighbours there are Vladimir Putin, Vladimir Yakunin, Andrei Fursenko, Sergey Fursenko, Viktor Myachin, Vladimir Smirnov and Nikolay Shamalov. Together they instituted the co-operative society Ozero (the Lake) which united their properties on 10 November 1996.

In November 2000, he was a main shareholder of the Brewery "Baltika" (Russian: пивоваренная компания "Балтика"). Since 2004, he has been chair of Rossiya Bank and its largest shareholder.

The May 2008 issue of Russian Forbes listed him for the first time in its Golden Hundred of Russia's richest, calling him and another new entrant to the List, Gennady Timchenko, "good acquaintances of Vladimir Putin." The magazine placed him at number 53 on the Russians-only list, with an estimated fortune of $1.9 billion. After sanctions imposed on Kovalchuk in 2018, this dropped to $650 million.

His elder brother Mikhail Kovalchuk is the scientific secretary of the Council for Science and High Technologies attached to the president of the Russian Federation.

In 2015, Yury Kovalchuk's National Media Group (NMG) and US Discovery Channel joined forces to form Media Alliance of which NMG owns 80%. Later that year, Kovalchuk acquired the rights to Ted Turner's Russian assets including the Russian version of CNN, Cartoon Network and Boomerang. The reason for the sale was based on the Russian media ownership law that limits ownership of Russian media by foreigners. In 2020, the world's leading streaming entertainment service Netflix partnered with the National Media Group to launch a local-language streaming service in Russia.

In 2017, Kovalchuk purchased the century-old Novy Svet vineyard in Crimea for $26.4 million in one of the first privatization deals in the region since the annexation of the region by Russia. As of January 2019, Kovalchuk and Nikolai Shamalov through their ownership of Rossiya Bank have become the most important investors in Russia's development of annexed Crimea.

On 15 April 2021, Alexei Navalny's website stated that since 2003 Kovalchuk has owned Putin's residence at Valdai, which is on the southern 100 hectares (250 acres) of a peninsula between Lake Uzhin and Lake Valdai in the Novgorod Oblast near Saint Petersburg and across Lake Valdai from Valday. Built in 1980, Putin's Dacha is often called Valdai, Dolgie Borody, or Stalin's Dacha, though Stalin was not alive when it was built. Abutting north of this location is 150 hectares (370 acres) owned by the Russian Federation and used by the Federal Security Service. Kovalchuk leases Putin's Dacha to the Russian government for an undisclosed price.

Kovalchuk owns shares in several of Russia's most influential TV channels, including Channel One Russia. In December 2021, Alisher Usmanov's holding company USM said it had sold its stake in Russia's leading internet group VK to state-run insurance company Sogaz, which is partly owned by Yury Kovalchuk.

== Sanctions ==
Kovalchuk was one of several individuals sanctioned by the U.S. Treasury Department on 20 March 2014 in response to the annexation of Crimea by the Russian Federation. According to the U.S. Treasury, Kovalchuk is a close advisor to President Putin and has been referred to as one of his "cashiers".

Kovalchuk was sanctioned by the British government in 2014 in relation to the Russo-Ukrainian War.

== See also ==
- List of Russian people by net worth
- List of people and organizations sanctioned during the Russo-Ukrainian War
