= Fursenko =

Fursenko may refer to:

- Sergey Fursenko
- Andrei Fursenko
- 6753 Fursenko
