= Gazfond =

Pension fund of Gazprom

Gazfond logo

Gazfond is the pension fund of Gazprom. It was founded in 1994 by Gazprom, Gazprombank and several other organizations. Gazfond owned a 3.22-percent share of Gazprom as of September 5, 2005.

The fund is managed by Leader Asset Management (Chairman of the Board of Directors: Yuri Shamalov, CEO: Anatoly Gavrilenko). In 2006 Gazprom sold its shares in Leader to the SOGAZ Insurance Company which is controlled by Bank Rossiya. In March 2014, Bank Rossiya sold its indirect control of Leader to Gazfond. Gazfond owns a 45% stake in Leader. As of November 2014, Gazfond is the largest shareholder of Gazprombank which controls Gazprom-Media.

Since 2003, Yuri Shamalov has been the President of Gazfond.
