= LLCInvest =

Russian conglomerate

Invest (LLC Invest) is a large conglomerate of companies with assets worth tens of billions of dollars. Almost all organizations included in LLCInvest do not have public activities. The company became widely known on June 20, 2022, after the publication of a journalistic investigation by Meduza and OCCRP. Most of the organizations are tied to Rossiya Bank, often described as Vladimr Putin's personal cashbox.

The llcinvest.ru domain is owned by Moskomsvyaz, that is closely linked to Bank Rossiya.

== Closely affiliated assets ==
In total, more than 85 companies and organizations use mail from the llcinvest.ru domain (as their official email or for directors or shareholders). They own monetary assets of at least 4.5 billion dollars. Among them:

=== Companies ===
- Joint Stock Company "Altituda" (owns 51% share in RusGazDobycha)
- Russair (Russian: «Руссэйр»)

=== Real estate ===
- Putin's Palace
- Vineyards and Winery Lazurnaya Yagoda near Putin's Palace
- Igora Ski Resort
- Igora Drive motorsport complex
- Mansion near Igora
- Fisherman's Hut and 420 hectares of land in Lake Ladoga near the Kortela village
- Villa Sellgren
- Villa in Rus Sanatorium in Sochi
- Land and buildings near Dolgiye Borody residence
- House of Katerina Tikhonova

=== Vessels ===
- Shellest ($23,145,000)
- Nega (~ $10,000,000)
- Aldoga (~ $9,000,000)
- Brizo 46 (~ $1,200,000)

=== Aircraft ===
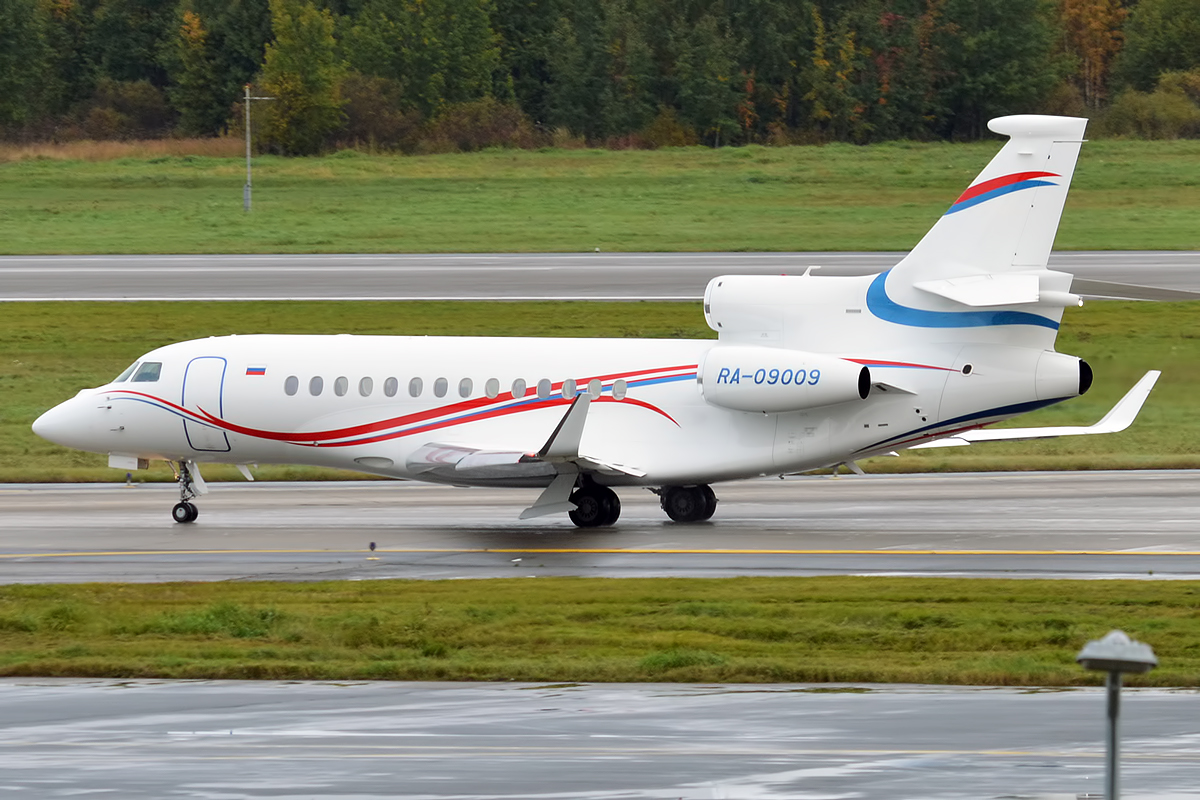
RA-09009, October 2017

- New model Falcon 7X (tail number RA-09009)

== Other affiliated assets ==
Companies Delta and Ena-Invest did not use LLCInvest domains, but do have visible connections to LLCInvest companies. Delta owns 17% share in Sibur, Ena-Invest owns 19% share in Novatek. These assets are valued at almost 12 billion dollars.

== See also ==
- Ozero (LLCInvest is often referred to as "digital consumer cooperative Ozero").
