= Gennady Petrov =

Russian entrepreneur

Gennady Vasilyevich Petrov (Russian: Геннадий Васильевич Петров; born July 19, 1947 in Leningrad) is a Russian entrepreneur and alleged leader of the Tambov gang (“Tambovskaya Bratva”) from Saint Petersburg. In the 1990s, Petrov maintained close contacts with high-ranking officials and businesspeople in Vladimir Putin's circle. Later, his activities brought him to the attention of international investigators: Spanish prosecutors accused his network of money laundering and arms trafficking, among other things.

== Career ==
Petrov grew up in Leningrad and became involved in organized crime in the 1980s, while also allegedly working as an informant for the KGB. During this time, he met gangster boss Alexander Malyshev and became his close associate. After the collapse of the USSR, Petrov participated in the establishment of business ventures: in 1992, he founded the Petroleum Financial Company together with former KGB agent Igor Najiwalt, and in 1994, he co-founded the large construction company Baltic Construction Company (BSK) together with Mikhail Shelomov, a nephew of Vladimir Putin. Petrov also became a partner in Bank Rossiya, which is often regarded as the financial base of the later Putin regime. Also in 1994, Petrov was temporarily arrested in St. Petersburg for allegedly forming a criminal organization, among other things; however, the case was dropped shortly thereafter.

After the re-election of Mayor Anatoly Sobchak and his confidant Putin failed in St. Petersburg in 1996, Petrov left Russia and went to Spain, together with other members of Russian organized crime (such as Malyshev, among others). There he settled in Marbella. According to Spanish investigators, he established a network of companies through which at least €50 million in criminal proceeds were laundered into real estate and businesses starting in 1998. From Spain, he coordinated various business activities within and outside Russia. In 2008, Petrov was arrested in Marbella but was released on bail (€600,000). He then returned to Russia, where he refused extradition and now officially lives in Saint Petersburg again.

== Criminal activities ==
Petrov is considered the driving force behind a cross-border criminal syndicate that has been operating since the 1990s under the name Tambovsk-Malyshevskoye prestupnoe soobshchestvo. He is alleged to be involved in racketeering, contract killings, pimping, and arms and drug trafficking. He is also a collector of artworks and is said to have been involved in art forgery. As part of the Spanish “Troika laundromat” investigation into the Russian mafia, around 20 suspects were arrested in 2008, including Petrov and Alexander Malyshev. The charges included money laundering, extortion, arms and drug smuggling, and other serious crimes. According to Spanish authorities, Petrov's organization had set up companies specifically to invest tens of millions of euros in Spain. However, Petrov was released on bail and fled to Russia. Russian courts repeatedly refused to approve his extradition to Spain. In October 2018, a Spanish court ultimately acquitted all defendants in the “Troika” investigations.

== Political connections ==
Petrov's close ties to Russian politics are well documented. According to research, he is considered one of the mafia bosses with direct access to Putin's inner circle, whom he has known since his time in Saint Petersburg in the 1990s. Petrov repeatedly mentioned that he was in contact with a certain influential person whom he called “the higher-ups” or “the tsar,” an obvious reference to President Putin. According to Juan Untoria, lawyer for the “Russian mafia,” he is “Putin's friend.”

According to Spanish investigators, Petrov maintained contacts with numerous top politicians and oligarchs for years. The list of defendants includes former Defense Minister Anatoly Serdyukov, former Deputy Prime Minister Dmitry Kozak, former Communications Minister Leonid Reiman, Duma deputy Vladislav Reznik, former deputy head of the Federal Drug Control Service Nikolai Aulov, and other leading Russian officials. The parliamentary circle around Reznik is described as having particularly close ties to Petrov. Reznik was a long-time member of the United Russia party and served as a financial expert in the Duma. He sat on the supervisory board of Bank Rossiya and is said to have assisted Petrov in Spanish real estate transactions. According to Spanish investigators, Petrov and Reznik met several times on Petrov's luxury yacht or at other events, and they shared private jets and vacation homes. A Spanish arrest warrant states that Reznik acted “at the highest level on behalf of Mr. Petrov and his organization.”

Other acquaintances of Putin were also part of Petrov's network. Since his return, Petrov has been living in St. Petersburg in an apartment building where, since 2003, numerous influential figures from Putin's circle have owned apartments, including Rossija Bank co-owner Nikolai Shamalov, oligarchs Arkadij Rotenberg and Yuri Kovalchuk, and others. The totality of these connections led observers to conclude that Petrov was an important link between the mafia, secret services, and government cliques in Russia. In addition to communicating with ministers and oligarchs, Petrov is described in reports as someone who even influenced ministerial appointments—among other things, his network is credited with forcing the former health minister to resign and soon thereafter making Dmitry Kozak deputy prime minister. Sergei Korolev, whom Putin appointed deputy head of the domestic intelligence service FSB in 2021, apparently acted as the liaison for the appointments. Top politicians such as Reznik referred to Petrov as their “boss” in telephone conversations.
