= Andrei Fursenko =

Russian oligarch (born 1949)

- Андрей Фурсенко
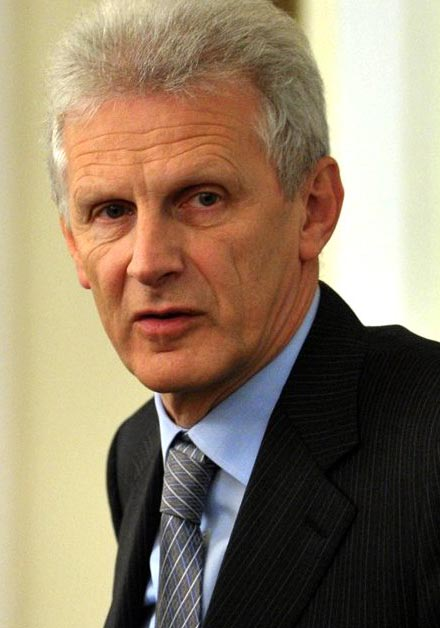
- Fursenko in 2012

Aide to the President of Russia
- Incumbent
- Assumed office 21 May 2012
- President: Vladimir Putin

Minister of Education and Science
- In office 9 March 2004 – 21 May 2012
- Prime Minister: Vladimir Putin
- Preceded by: Vladimir Filippov
- Succeeded by: Dmitry Livanov

Minister of Industry, Science and Technologies
- Acting; 6 December 2003 – 9 March 2004
- Prime Minister: Mikhail Kasyanov
- Preceded by: Ilya Klebanov
- Succeeded by: Viktor Khristenko

Personal details
- Born: Andrei Aleksandrovich Fursenko; 17 July 1949 (age 77) Leningrad, Soviet Union (now Russia)
- Party: United Russia
- Relatives: Sergey Fursenko (brother)
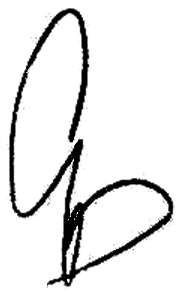
- Signature

Andrei Fursenko's voice
recorded February 2013

Andrei Aleksandrovich Fursenko (Russian: Андрей Александрович Фурсенко, IPA: [ɐnˈdrʲej ɐlʲɪkˈsandrəvʲɪtɕ ˈfursʲɪnkə]; born 17 July 1949) is a Russian politician, scientist and businessman. He has the federal state civilian service rank of 1st class Active State Councillor of the Russian Federation. He was the Minister of Education and Science of the Russian Federation from 2004 to 2012. He is considered to be a member of the Saint Petersburg political groups under Vladimir Putin's presidency.

== Family and education ==
His father Aleksandr Fursenko (1927–2008) was a renowned historian, a member of the Russian Academy of Sciences. His brother Sergey Fursenko (b. 1954) is a technician, businessman, TV producer and the president of the football club Zenit (St. Petersburg).

Andrei Fursenko entered the Department of Mathematics and Mechanics of the Leningrad State University in 1966 and graduated from there in 1971. In the university he became a member of the Communist Party of the Soviet Union, which he left in August 1991 as it had been banned.

== Career ==
From 1971 to 1991 he worked in Leningrad at the Ioffe Physico-Technical Institute as a junior researcher, senior researcher, the chief of the Computer Department (1985–1989), deputy director for science (1987–1991).

He defended his Candidate of Science dissertation in physics in 1978 and his Doctor of Science dissertation in physics in 1990.

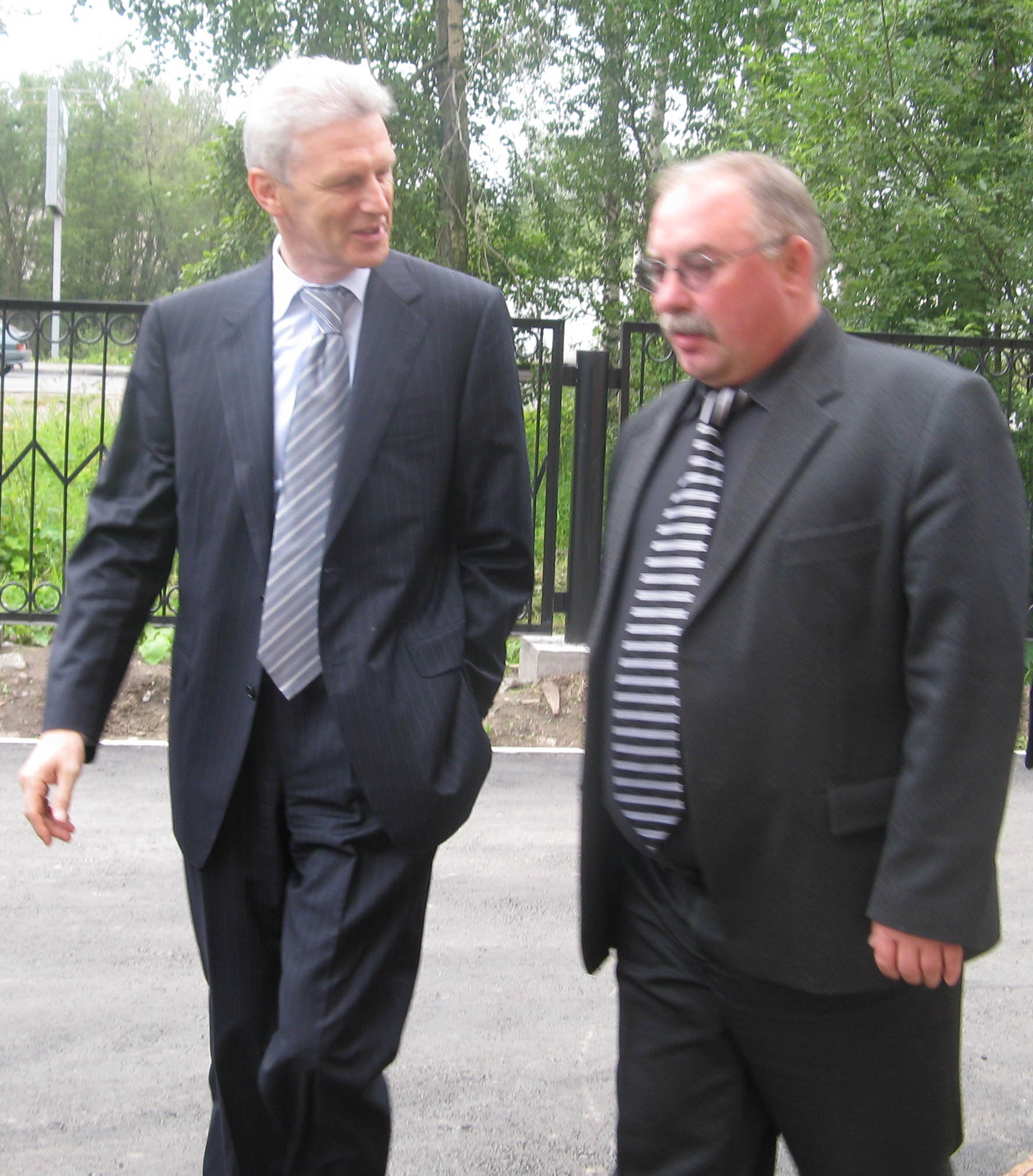
Andrei Fursenko(left) visiting Arkangelsk

In 1990-1991 together with Yuriy Kovalchuk (another deputy director) and Vladimir Yakunin (head of the foreign relations department of the institute) he tried to create a commercial enterprise within the institute that would be engaged in the application of scientific achievements. These plans, however, were opposed by Zhores Alfyorov, director, so that Fursenko, Kovalchuk and Yakunin left their positions in the institute.

Outside the institute in St. Petersburg they founded several companies specializing in science application.

In 1991-1992 Fursenko was a vice-president of the R&D company Advanced Technology Center Ltd headed by Yuriy Kovalchuk.

Since 1992 - November 2001 he was the Director General of the St. Petersburg Regional Foundation for Scientific and Technological Development attached to the electronic factory OJSC Svetlana. RFSED was founded by the Russia bank, JSC "Fund for Regional Development, OJSC Svetlana, City Property Committee of St. Petersburg and three more enterprises.

In 1993 Andrei Fursenko got acquainted with Vladimir Putin who worked in the Office of the Mayor of St. Petersburg as the head of the Committee for External Relations and had registered some of his companies.

Since the early 90s, Andrei Fursenko owns a dacha in Solovyovka, Priozersky District of the Leningrad region, which is located on the eastern shore of the Komsomol'skoye lake on the Karelian Isthmus near St. Petersburg. His neighbours there are Vladimir Putin, Vladimir Yakunin, his brother Sergey Fursenko, Yuriy Kovalchuk, Viktor Myachin, Vladimir Smirnov and Nikolay Shamalov. On 10 November 1996, together they instituted the co-operative society Ozero (the Lake) which united their properties.

In May 1994 - September 1995 he was CEO of Russian-German Joint venture Investment Consulting Company St. Petersburg (ICC).

In 1995 Andrei Fursenko became a member of the pro-government Our Home Is Russia party.

In September 2000 - 2001 he was a Philippines consul in St. Petersburg, A.H.

Since October 2000 he is the Chairman of the Academic Council of the Foundation "Centre for Strategic Research North-West" (CEO Yuriy Kovalchuk).

== Government ==
From November 2001 until November 2003 Fursenko was Deputy Minister of Industry, Science and Technologies of the Russian Federation. From November 2003 until March 2004 he was Minister of Industry, Science and Technologies of the Russian Federation. From 9 March 2004 until 21 May 2012 Fursenko was Minister of Education and Science of the Russian Federation.

Andrei Fursenko refused to prevent compulsory teaching of religious subjects at school and objected to teaching advanced mathematics at school.

Andrei Fursenko is married and has a son named Alexander. He is fluent in English.

=== Sanctions ===
Because of the annexation of Crimea by the Russian Federation, the Office of Foreign Assets Control (OFAC) published on March 20, 2014, that Fursenko and 19 other men have been added to the Specially Designated Nationals List (SDN) which froze his assets in the United States, prevented him from traveling to the United States, and prohibited United States citizens and entities from conducting business with Fursenko.

He was sanctioned by the British government in 2022 in relation to the Russian invasion of Ukraine.

== Honours ==
- Order "For Services to the Fatherland» IV degree (10 August 2009) - for his great contribution in the development of education and science of the Russian Federation and many years of fruitful activity.
- Certificate of Merit from the Government of the Russian Federation (17 July 2004) - for his great personal contribution to the development of fundamental and applied science, the formation of the national innovation system and many years of fruitful work.

== See also ==
- Ozero
- Sergey Fursenko

Preceded by Ilya Klebanov	Minister of Industry, Science and Technology of the Russian Federation; 2 November 2003 – March 2004	Succeeded by N/A
Preceded by Vladimir Filippov	Minister of Education and Science of the Russian Federation; 9 March 2004 – 21 May 2012	Succeeded by Dmitry Livanov
