= Vladimir Yakunin =

Russian oligarch (born 1948)

- Владимир Якунин
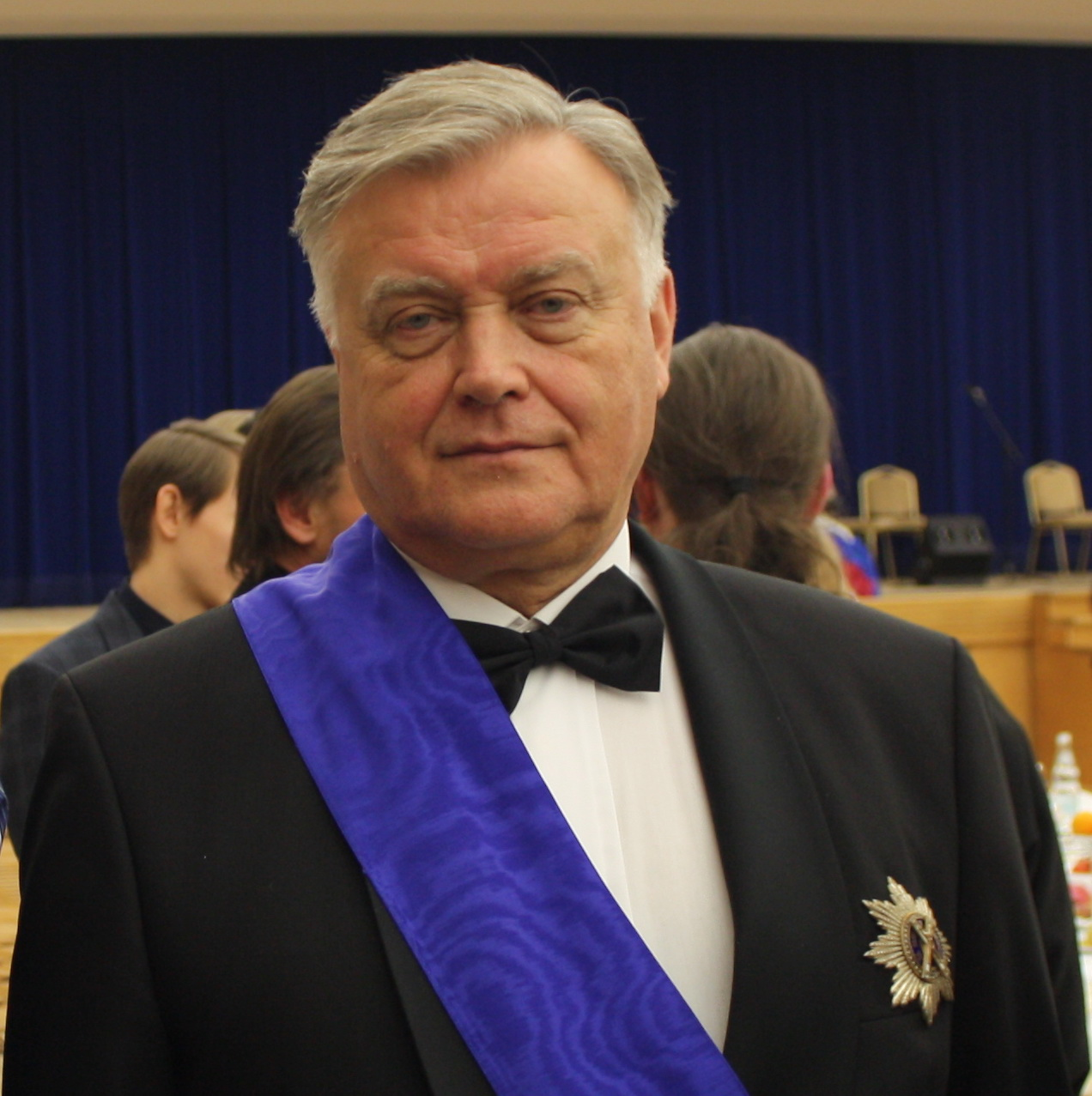
- Yakunin in 2013

President of Russian Railways
- In office 15 June 2005 – 20 August 2015
- Preceded by: Gennady Fadeyev
- Succeeded by: Oleg Belozyorov

Personal details
- Born: Vladimir Ivanovich Yakunin; 30 June 1948 (age 78) Melenki, Russian SFSR, Soviet Union (now Russia)
- Relations: Andrey Yakunin (son)
- Profession: Doctor of Political Sciences

Vladimir Ivanovich Yakunin (Russian: Владимир Иванович Якунин; born 30 June 1948) is a Russian businessman and close confidant of Vladimir Putin. He was president of Russian Railways from June 2005 to August 2015. He has the federal state civilian service rank of 1st class Active State Councillor of the Russian Federation.

In March 2014, in the wake of the annexation of Crimea, he was placed on the US State Department's list of sanctioned Russian officials and businessmen.

== Early life ==
Yakunin was born in Melenki in Gus-Khrustalny District, Vladimir Oblast. In 1972, Yakunin graduated from the Leningrad Mechanical Institute where he studied aircraft construction, and specialized in engineering and the maintenance of long-range ballistic missiles. Yakunin's career began in the State Institute for Applied Chemistry in Leningrad, where he worked from 1972 to 1975. In 1975, he joined the Soviet Army.

== Career ==
Between 1985 and 1991, Yakunin was part of the Soviet diplomatic mission to the United Nations, becoming the Mission's First Secretary in 1988.

He served in the KGB during the Soviet era.

In the early 1990s, he owned a dacha in Solovyovka, Priozersky district of Leningrad region, on the eastern shore of the Komsomol'skoye lake on the Karelian Isthmus near St. Petersburg. His neighbours there included Vladimir Putin, Andrei Fursenko, Sergey Fursenko, Yuriy Kovalchuk, Viktor Myachin, Vladimir Smirnov and Nikolay Shamalov. On 10 November 1996, together they set up the co-operative society Ozero covering their properties.

Yakunin was the president of Russian Railways from 2005 until 2015.

On 12 December 2012 in Paris, the International Union of Railways General Assembly appointed Yakunin Chairman of the Union. He was unanimously reappointed on 3 December 2014 and continued to serve as head until his retirement.

Yakunin is President of the World Public Forum "Dialogue of Civilizations", an International NGO registered in Vienna, Austria, which he co-founded with C. Kapur of India and N. Papanikolao from Greece/USA. Before it was transformed into a DOC research Institute, World Public Forum "Dialogue of Civilizations" was an initiative to link people from different backgrounds, civilizations, traditions and religions. It organizes the annual Rhodes Forum on Dialogue of Civilizations.

== Sanctions ==
On 20 March 2014, the United States government issued sanctions in response to what it saw as the Russian government's role in ongoing unrest in Ukraine. The Specially Designated Nationals List (SDN) imposes a travel ban to the United States, the freezing of all Yakunin's U.S. assets, and a ban on business transactions between American citizens and corporations and Yakunin and any businesses he owns. The Australian Government announced on 19 March 2014 that it would impose a sanctions regime in response to the Russian threat to the sovereignty and territorial integrity of Ukraine. Yakunin was placed on Australia's DFAT consolidated list on 19 June 2014, described as a 'close personal and financial associate of Vladimir Putin'. He was also sanctioned by the UK government on 13 April 2022 in relation to the Russo-Ukrainian War.

== Retired from Russian Railways ==
In August 2015, media reports said Yakunin has retired as head of Russian Railways, but in October, further reports suggested he had been dismissed. Russian and British media have alleged that Yakunin's dismissal was a direct result of his son Andrey Yakunin's decision to apply for UK citizenship.

== Awards ==
- Legion of Honour (France, 28 July 2010)
- Decoration of Honour for Services to the Republic of Austria (Austria, 3 March 2011)
- Grand Officer of the Order of Merit of the Italian Republic (Italy, 21 February 2012)
- Order of Civil Merit (Spain, 9 August 2012)
- Gold Medal of Medal for Merits (Serbia, 2 September 2013)
- Order of the Holy Sepulchre (Greek Orthodox Patriarchate of Jerusalem, 2004)

== Personal life ==
Vladimir Yakunin is fond of hunting. He loves the theater.

His wife is Yakunina Natalia Viktorovna. They have sons Andrey (born 1975) and Viktor (born 1978).

His son Andrey Yakunin owns property in the UK. Andrey ran a UK-based venture capital firm: Venture Investments & Yield Management LLP.

== See also ==
- List of people and organizations sanctioned during the Russo-Ukrainian War

== Books ==
- The Treacherous Path: An Insider's Account of Modern Russia (Biteback Publishing Ltd, 2018) [ISBN 978-1-78590-301-4 hard bound]
