= Sergey Fursenko =

Russian businessman (born 1954)

- Сергей Фурсенко
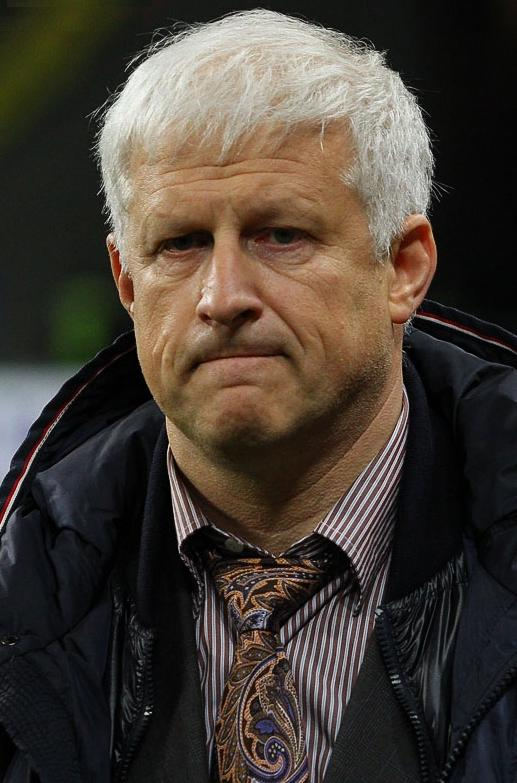
- Fursenko in 2011
- Born: Sergey Aleksandrovich Fursenko; 1954 (age 71–72); Leningrad, Soviet Union (now Russia)
- Relatives: Andrei Fursenko (brother)

Sergey Aleksandrovich Fursenko (Russian: Серге́й Алекса́ндрович Фу́рсенко; born 1954) is a Russian businessman.

He is a brother of Andrei Fursenko.

== Career ==
Since the early 1990s, Fursenko has owned a dacha in Solovyovka, Priozersky District of the Leningrad region, on the eastern shore of Lake Komsomolskoye on the Karelian Isthmus near St. Petersburg. His neighbours there are Vladimir Putin, Vladimir Yakunin, his brother Andrei Fursenko, Yuriy Kovalchuk, Viktor Myachin, Vladimir Smirnov and Nikolay Shamalov. On 10 November 1996, together they instituted the co-operative society Ozero (the Lake) which united their properties.

Since July 2003, Fursenko has been the director general of the JSC Lentransgaz, a subsidiary of Gazprom.

Since 2005, he has been the director general (later president) of the football club Zenit, Saint Petersburg.

From February 2010 until June 2012, he was the president of the Russian Football Union.

=== Sanctions ===
In April 2018, the United States imposed sanctions on him and 23 other Russian nationals.

He was sanctioned by the UK government in 2022 in relation to the Russo-Ukrainian War.

== Gallery ==
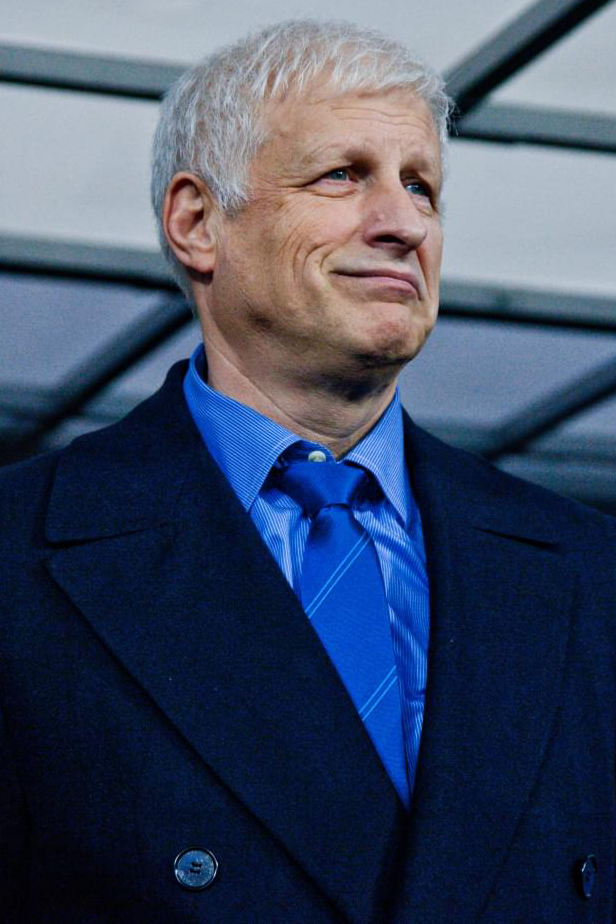
Sergey Fursenko in 2017

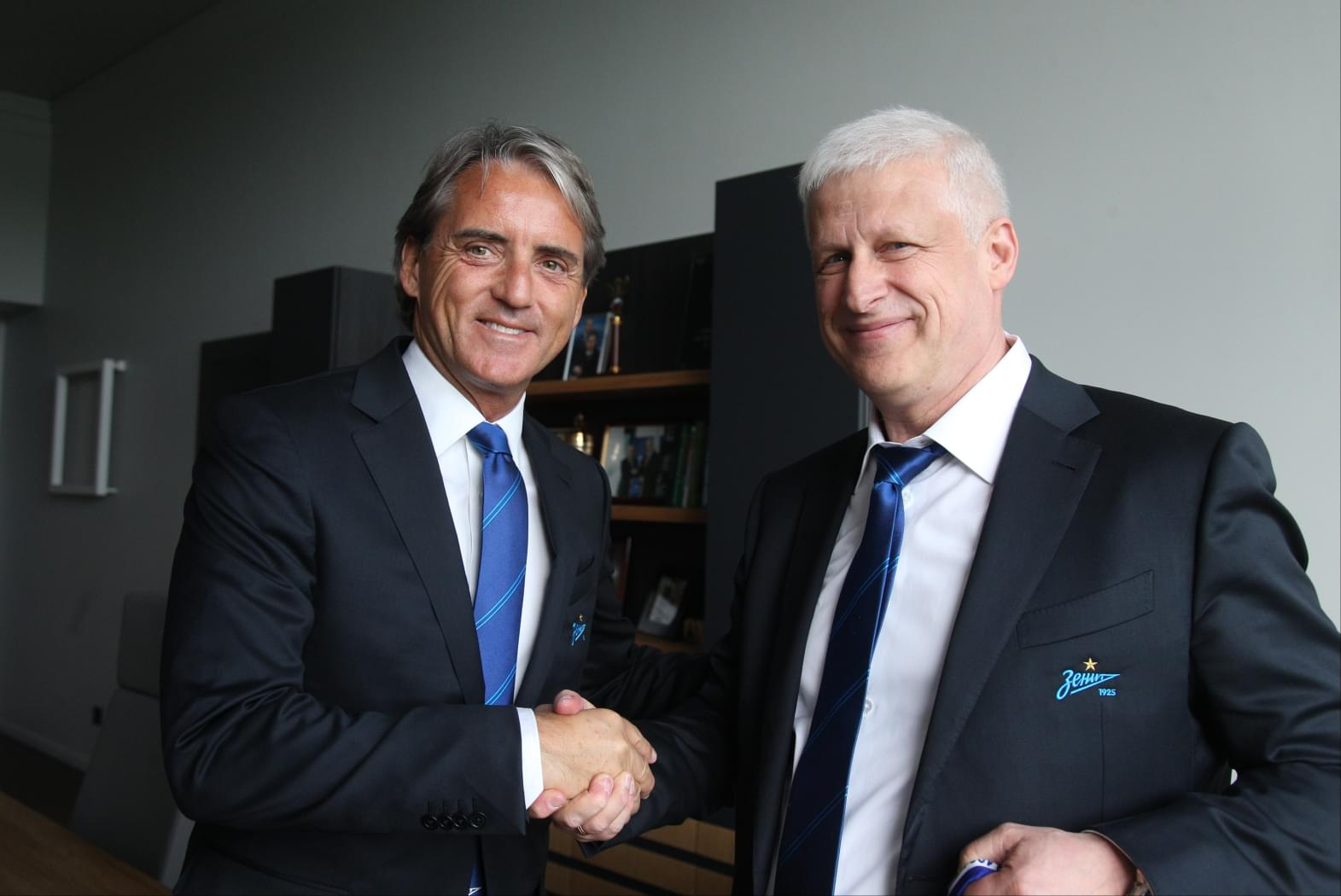
Sergey Fursenko and Roberto Mancini

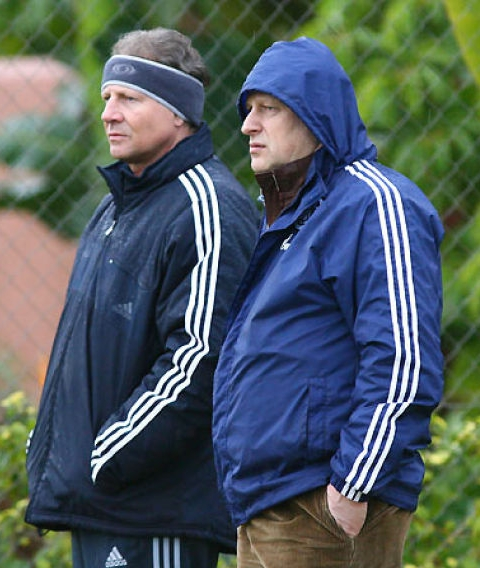
Sergey Fursenko and Vlastimil Petržela in 2006
