= Stolyarenko =

Stolyarenko (Ukrainian: Столяренко) is a Ukrainian-language surname derived from the occupation of stolyar, or "carpenter", "cabinetmaker", "joiner", literally meaning "son of carpenter". Notable people with this surname include:

- Aleksandr Stolyarenko (born 1991), Russian footballer
- Julija Stoliarenko (born 1993), Lithuanian mixed martial artist
- Vladimir Stolyarenko (born 1961), Russian banker
