= Gazprombank =

Russian bank

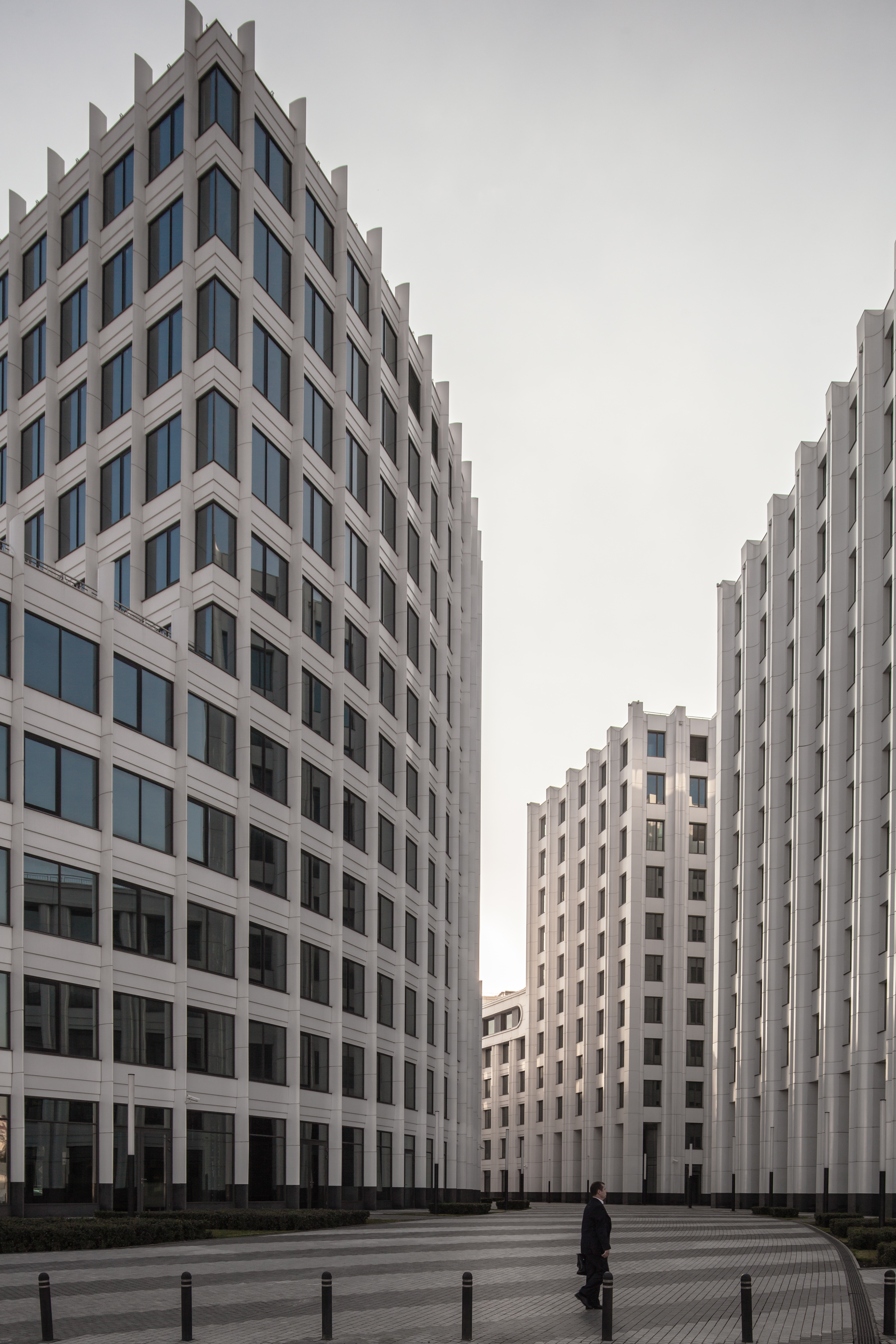
- Complex of Gazprombank buildings on Ozerkovskaya embankment in Moscow
- Native name: Газпромбанк
- Type: Public company
- Industry: Financial services
- Founded: 1990; 36 years ago
- Headquarters: Moscow, Russia
- Key people: Andrey Akimov (CEO); Alexei Miller (Chairman)
- Products: Retail banking; corporate banking; investment banking; insurance; private banking; private equity; mortgage loans; credit cards; investment management; wealth management; asset management; mutual funds; exchange-traded funds; index funds
- Operating income: ▲RUB 229.1 billion (2020)
- Net income: ▲RUB 56.0 billion (2020)
- Total assets: ▲RUB 7.530 trillion (2020)
- Total equity: ▲RUB 739.3 billion (2020)
- Owners: Gazprom (46.02%) (2019)
- Number of employees: 12,700 (2013)
- Subsidiaries: Gazprom-Media
- Rating: Ba2 (Moody's), BB+ (S&P), BB+ (Fitch) (2017)
- Website: www.gazprombank.com

Gazprombank (Russian: Газпромбанк), or GPB (JSC), is a private-owned Russian bank, the third largest bank in the country by assets. Since November 2014, Yuri Shamalov's Gazfond is its largest shareholder. Gazprombank is one of the main channels for payments for Russian oil and gas.

The bank’s principal business areas are corporate banking, retail banking, investment banking and depository services. Its banking activities also include securities trading, foreign exchange operations, precious metals operations, clearing operations and settlement services.

The bank has a distribution network of 43 branches and over 260 banking outlets located throughout the Russian Federation. GPB also has ownership interests in three other Russian banks. In addition, Gazprombank is represented in the market of Belarus through ownership interests in foreign bank: Belgazprombank (Belarus). Gazprombank (Switzerland) Ltd announced it was ceasing to trade in October 2022. Gazprombank also has representative offices in Mongolia, China and India.

== History ==
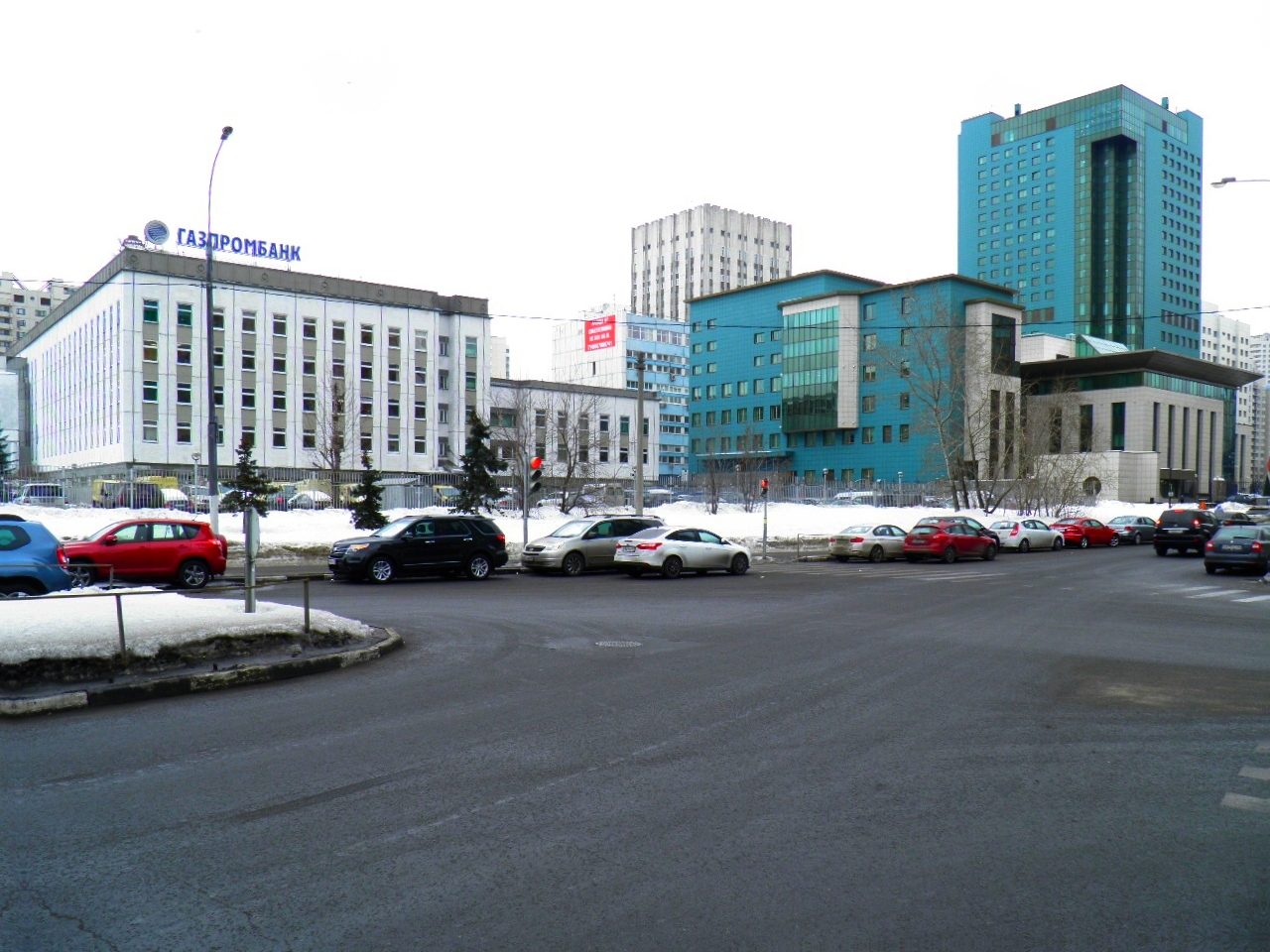
Gazprombank in the Novocheremushkinskaya Street office block, Moscow

The Commercial Bank of the Gas Industry “Gazprombank” was established on July 31, 1990. In August 1996, its organizational and legal form was changed to a limited liability company; on November 13, 2001, the bank became a closed joint-stock company under the name “Joint-Stock Commercial Bank of the Gas Industry ‘Gazprombank’”; from August 31, 2007, it operated as an open joint-stock company under the same name, and since December 2014 it has operated as a joint-stock company “Gazprombank.”

In August 2005 for 37.22 billion rubles, Gazprombank purchased Gazprom Media, the largest Russian media holding, which includes the former Media Most holdings of Vladimir Gusinsky including the Sem Days publishing house, Echo of Moscow, both the NTV channel and NTV Plus, and Izvestia newspaper, from the bank's parent company Gazprom. After Gazprom-Media took over "Media Most" in 2000, Gazprom-Media received Filipp Bobkov's entire former KGB 5th directorate (Political police) which was responsible for disinformation, control of dissidents, and executions including all of its employees, its database and the Filipp Bobkov founded security service that was accused of attempting an assassination in 1994 of Boris Berezovsky. The entire archive of 5th KGB Main Directorate was taken to Media-Most.

In 2012, OJSC Gazprom owned a 41.73% stake in Gazprombank and NPF Gazfond owned a 46.92% stake in Gazprom. Most of the stake in Yuri Shamalov's Gazfond is managed by Anatoly Gavrilenko's Lider Management which is part of the SOGAZ insurance group which, until March 2014, was controlled by the Vladimir Putin associated Rossiya Bank which has Yuri Kovalchuk as its largest shareholder. In March 2014 Rossiya bank sold its indirect control of Lider to Gasfond which has a 45% stake in Lider. As of November 2014, Gazfond is the largest shareholder of Gazprombank which controls Gazprom Media.

The bank was nominated in 2014 for the annual Emerging Market Bond Awards, hosted by EuroWeek.

In August 2022, the state capitalized Gazprombank by 50 billion rubles at the expense of the Russian National Wealth Fund. The authorized capital of the bank increased to 246.85 billion rubles. Now the state owns a share of 36.44%.

In September 2023, Gazprombank bought the MEGA shopping centre chain from IKEA. The chain consisted of 14 centres in various regions of Russia with a total area of 2.3 million sq.m.

Since 2003, the company has been developing under the leadership of Andrey Igorevich Akimov.

=== Sanctions ===
In July 2014, the United States Department of the Treasury imposed sanctions on Gazprombank OAO that prohibit U.S. citizens from providing it with new financing. In response, Gazprombank contracted former U.S. Senator Trent Lott to lobby on its behalf against the sanctions.

On February 24, 2022, US President Joe Biden announced sanctions against Gazprombank and other Russian financial institutions in response to Russia's invasion of Ukraine.

In March 2022, UK imposed sanctions on Gazprombank, which means that the bank is subject to asset freezes which locks it out of any resources held in Britain and prevents British firms from doing business with it.

On 25 January 2023, the US correspondent banks of Gazprombank advised that they were terminating their accounts, meaning that Gazprombank can no longer make transfers in US dollars.

On November 21, 2024 the US imposed sanctions on Gazprombank preventing the bank from handling any new energy-related transactions that touch the US Financial system, trading with any US persons or entities and freezing its US Assets. Gazprombank was previously the last major unsanctioned Russian bank to allow European countries to pay Russia for critical energy supplies.

=== Mortality in the leadership team (2022) ===
On January 29, 2022, Leonid Shulman, the head of the Gazprom-invest transport service, was found dead.

On February 25, 2022, Alexander Tyulyakov, Deputy General Director of the Unified Settlement Center of Gazprom, was found dead in a noose.

On March 2, 2022, Igor Volobuev, Vice President of Gazprombank, fled Russia to move to his native Ukraine, having been born in Okhtyrka, Sumy. He has also joined the Ukrainian territorial defense in an effort to 'wash off' his Russian past.

On April 18, 2022, former Gazprombank vice-president, Vladislav Avayev, was found dead from gunshot wounds in his Moscow apartment, along with his wife and daughter, in an apparent murder-suicide. Volobuev considers the death of Vladislav Avayev an assassination.

On 12 January 2023, Russia issued an arrest warrant for the former vice president of Gazprombank, Igor Volobuev, for being a "foreign agent". In early 2022, he returned to Ukraine and joined the Ukrainian backed Freedom of Russia Legion, having since received decorations for valour in combat

== Gazprombank Suisse and Roldugin sanctions ==
Gazprombank Suisse, which employs around 80 people, declared in October 2022 that it was ceasing trading.

In 2023, four bankers at Gazprombank's Swiss branch have been accused of helping Sergei Roldugin, and by extension Vladimir Putin circumvent financial regulations and sanctions placed on Russia following the 2022 Russian invasion of Ukraine. Roldugin has previously been accused of being Putin's wallet, something that the Russian government has denied as anti-Russian propaganda.

According to the accusations that are currently being heard in a court in Switzerland, the bank failed to conduct due diligence checks on the owner of the accounts which were involved in moving money between accounts.
