= Rossiya Bank =

Russian joint stock bank

Bank Rossiya
- Type: joint-stock company
- Industry: Financial services
- Founded: 1990; 36 years ago
- Headquarters: Saint Petersburg, Russia
- Key people: Tatiana Polinko, CEO; Mikhail Klishin, Chairman of the Board of Directors
- Products: Financial services
- Revenue: ₽71 billion (2017)
- Rating: ruAA (Expert RA) (2026); AA(RU) (ACRA) (2026)
- Website: www.abr.ru

Bank "Rossiya" (Russian: Банк «Россия»), also known as Joint Stock Bank "Rossiya" (Russian: Акционерное общество «Акционерный Банк «Россия»), is a Russian joint-stock bank founded on June 27, 1990. Headquartered in Saint Petersburg, it is among the largest banks in Russia by assets.

The bank's largest shareholder is Yury Kovalchuk. Following the 2014 annexation of Crimea by the Russian Federation, Bank Rossiya became the first major Russian bank to expand its operations into the territory. Consequently, the bank and its primary shareholders were subjected to international sanctions by the United States, the European Union, and other countries. Following the Russian invasion of Ukraine in February 2022, Bank Rossiya was among the first Russian financial institutions disconnected from the SWIFT international payment system in March 2022.

== History ==
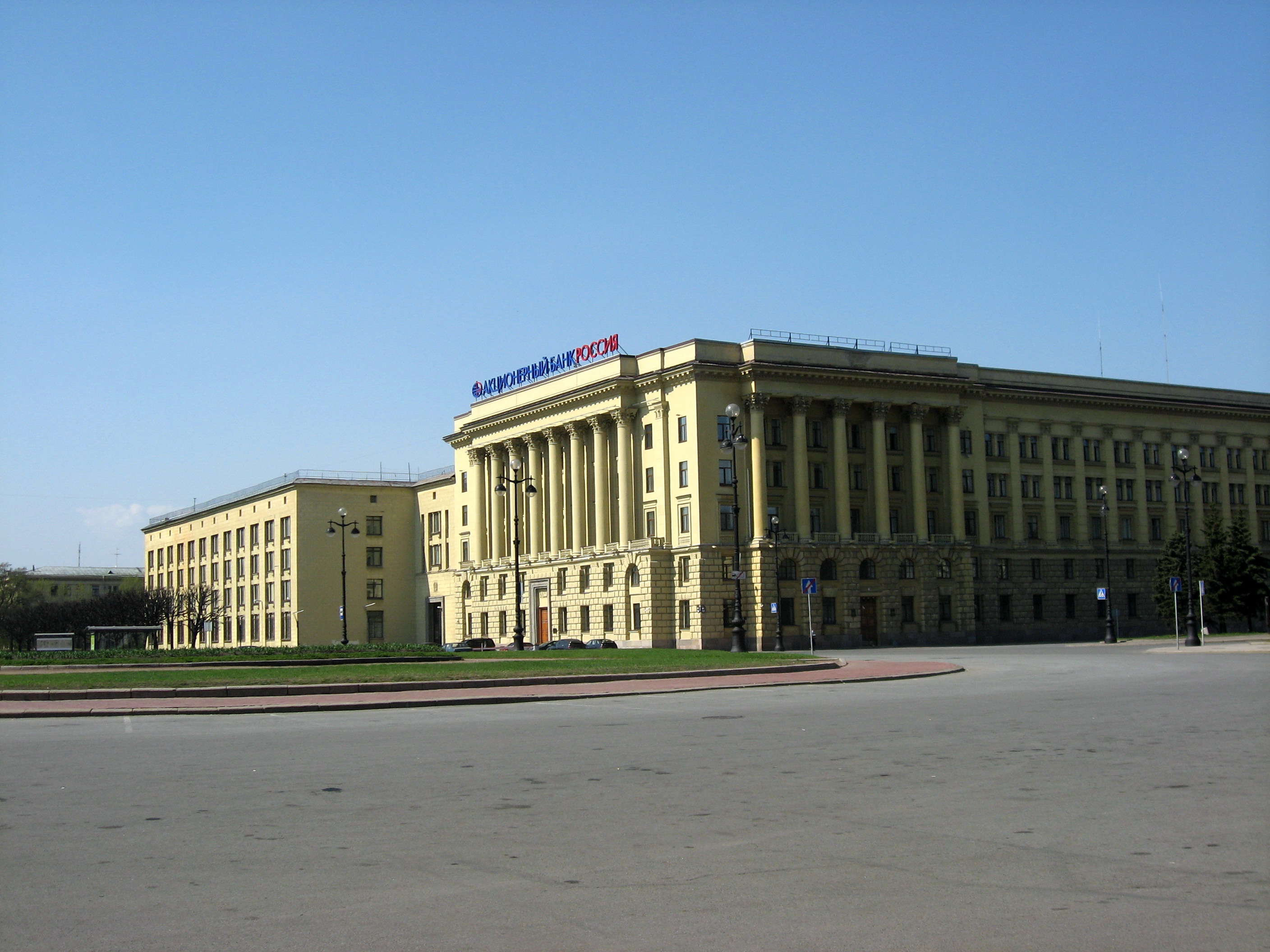
Rossiya's Headquarters on Rastrelli Square in Saint Petersburg

=== Communist Party ownership ===
On August 23, 1990, a secret memorandum from Vladimir Ivashko, who was Gorbachev's deputy general secretary, was issued to organize the transfer of CPSU funds, CPSU financing and support of its operations through associations, ventures, foundations, etc. which are to act as invisible economics. (Note: Richard L. Palmer, president of Cachet International, Inc., was the CIA station chief at the United States Embassy in Moscow from 1992 to 1994.) Bank Rossiya was one of the hundreds of enterprises that CPSU financiers used to funnel the party gold away.

In 1990, the CPSU committee of the Leningrad Oblast became Bank Rossiya's largest shareholder (48.4%), (Note: Founding shareholders in June 1990 included the firm Russian Video (13 million rubles, funded by the Leningrad CPSU committee), the insurance company Rus (founded by Aleksey Aleksandrov and headed by Vladislav Reznik), and the Soviet-Belgian company Digital Transfer. Total capital at registration was 31 million rubles.) but after the coup attempt in August 1991 the bank's activity was frozen on September 2, 1991 as it was CPSU-related. It was the first commercial bank to hold accounts for the foreign economic operations of both the regional committee of the CPSU and the local management of the KGB. (Note: The Zurich-based law firm Dietrich, Baumgartner & Partners managed Swiss bank accounts for Bank Rossiya's beneficial owners, including Sergei Roldugin, using Mossack Fonseca shell entities and Gazprombank Switzerland.)

In December 1991 its activity was resumed, as the shares had been redeemed on December 29, 1991 by some member ventures of the Leningrad Association of Joint Ventures, (Note: The Leningrad Association of Joint Ventures was led by Gennady Volodchenko, with Vladimir Kozhin as CEO of TSA, while Vladimir Putin oversaw its interests from City Hall. In 1993, Vitaly Savelyev became advisor to the board of Rossiya Bank.) shares of which were held by Vladimir Yakunin, Yury Kovalchuk, Mikhail Markov, Viktor Myachin, Andrei Fursenko, Sergey Fursenko, and Yury Nikolayev.

=== JV Neva Chance ===
The Austrian Russian joint venture JV Neva Chance received funds from the Revival of St. Petersburg Foundation (Russian: фонд «Возрождение Петербурга»), which was co-founded by Anatoly Sobchak and its CEO Alexander Margolis. (Note: In the 1990s, Alexander Valerievich Sobchak, a nephew of Anatoly Sobchak, founded nightlife and escort businesses in St. Petersburg.) A Los Angeles branch of the St. Petersburg Foundation was established by Mark Davidovich Lvovich (also known as Mark Neumann), who founded and headed the California firm Trada that received funds of "UNI-REM" which Sergei Bagaev (Note: In September 1996, Sergei Bagaev was murdered in Saint Petersburg on Shpalernaya Street.) headed. Leon Weinstein and his wife Gulnara Afanasyeva assisted the St. Petersburg Foundation when it sponsored Sobchak's visit to Los Angeles.

JV Neva Chance established thirty companies including JV Casino Neva.

=== Putin's capital support from Leningrad casinos ===
Beginning in 1991, Vladimir Putin was St Petersburg's chairman of the supervisory board for casinos and gambling (Russian: Председатель наблюдательного совета по казино и азартным играм) and, in 1993, began issuing gambling licenses in which shares were gained by the city of St Petersburg in the company Neva Chance (Russian: «Нева-Шанс») which owned the first St Petersburg casino AOZT Casino (Russian: АОЗТ «Казино») because it had the same address and phone numbers as city hall, but later it became JV Casino Neva (Russian: СП «Казино Нева») and opened on 19 August 1991. (Note: JV Neva Chance was co-owned by Austrian firm Novomatic and AOZT Casino, which shared an address and telephone lines with Vladimir Putin's Committee for External Relations. Proceeds were redirected via JV Petrodin by Viktor Zolotov to capitalize Bank Rossiya.) In 1992 or 1993 it changed its name to Laguna, then in 1997 to Admiral Club or more simply known as Admiral. According to the Yakuza Kinichi Kamiyasu who supplied slot machines with cash prizes to St Petersburg casinos in the 1990s from his Stockholm, Sweden, company Dyna Computer Service AB which was a subsidiary of the Masimichi Iida owned Osaka firm Dyna Company Ltd., organized crime figures Gennady Petrov, Alexander Malyshev, and Sergey Kuzmin operated the casino through a Vladimir Putin issued license in order to establish JV Petrodin in 1991. JV Petrodin, in which Kamiyasu owned a 35% stake and Gennady Petrov and Sergey Kuzmin owned a 65% stake through their company BXM, used the money from the casinos to provide capital for Bank Rossiya.

=== Capital outflows from the Soviet Union and Russia ===
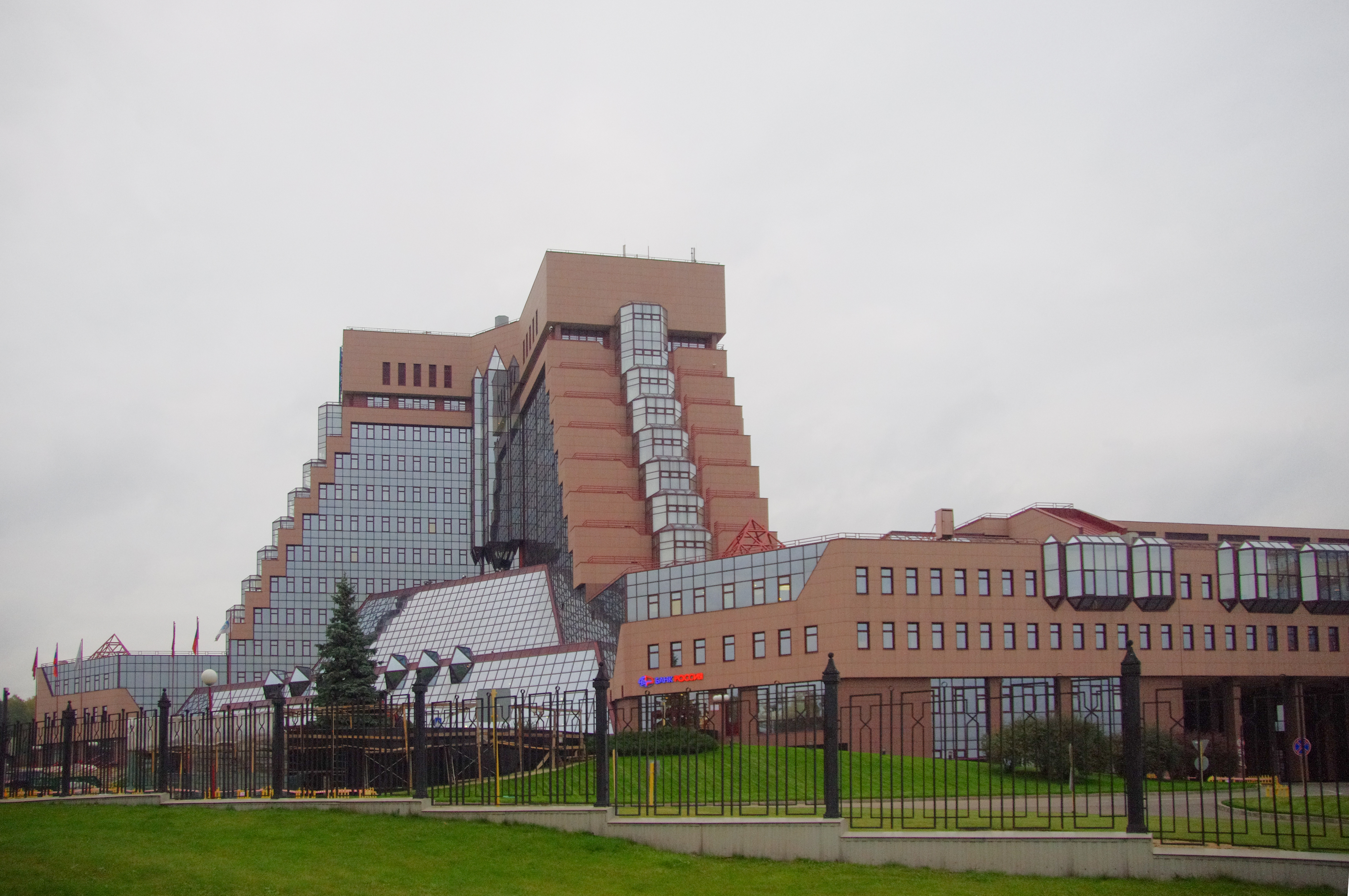
Rossiya's Central branch, town Gazoprovod, Novomoskovsky Administrative Okrug, Moscow.

In March 1992, the Yeltsin government contracted Kroll Associates to track down and find very large sums of money that had been removed from the Soviet Union prior to the August 1991 putsch on the Russian White House. In 1992, First Deputy Prime Minister Yegor Gaidar said, "Last year saw large-scale privatization by the nomenklatura, privatization by officials for their own personal benefit." Gaidar called the Communists and KGB officials criminals and that a "a vigorous search" for the money trails from state-owned capital had flowed abroad virtually unchecked before the collapse of the Soviet Union in the summer of 1991. On March 15, 1992, the Russian government froze all capital outflows from Russia. On April 4, 1992, Yeltsin issued “The fight against corruption in the public service” decree to provide for maximum transparency of officials and their institutions by providing a listing of their financial obligations, liabilities, securities, income, bank deposits, real estate holdings and their personal property and to prohibit officials from owning businesses. In April 1992, Kroll Associates began their investigations with Joseph Serio heading the Kroll Associates efforts in Moscow. (Note: From 1990 to 1991, Joseph Serio worked with the Soviet Interior Ministry as an American liaison.) Also, Joseph Rosetti, the vice chairman of Kroll Associates, was in Moscow to assist. The Kroll Associates determined that more than $14 billion in 1991 real dollars had been transferred from Switzerland to New York prior to the August 1991 putsch. Also, the Communist Party of the former Soviet Union along with other government agencies, such as the KGB, had transferred more than $40 billion in 2014 real dollars out of the country. The assets of the Vnesheconombank were frozen during the investigation. However, numerous transactions occurred to bypass the capital flow restrictions often with the British Barclays Bank in Cyprus acting a money laundering center for public officials from Saint Petersburg and Moscow. (Note: Vladimir Putin oversaw the Committee for External Relations during this period and served as first deputy mayor under Anatoly Sobchak.) According to Valery Makharadze, the government's chief inspector, many joint stock companies were formed to provide an illegal means for capital outflows from Russia, such as the Leningrad Association of Joint Ventures (Note: The Leningrad Association of Joint Ventures formed ventures with partners in Germany, Finland, and the US, while KOLO absorbed assets from defense enterprises.) and KOLO. Numerous officials became wealthy Russian oligarchs including numerous former KGB officials and prominent Communists. Jules B. Kroll, the head of the Kroll Associates, uncovered hundreds of illicit transactions with massive capital outflows. This outflow of capital directly contributed to severe economic conditions in Russia during Boris Yeltsin's second term, leading to its collapse, and resulting in the presidency of Vladimir Putin.

=== During the Putin administration ===
As of January 1, 2005, its major shareholders were Yury Kovalchuk with 37.6%, Nikolai Shamalov with 9.7%, Dmitry Gorelov with 9.7% and Alexei Mordashov's Severstal group with 8.8%. As of 2006, its major shareholders were Yuriy Kovalchuk (30.4%), Dmitry Gorelov (12.58%), Nikolai Shamalov (12.58%), JSC Transoil CIS (9.54%), JSC Severstal Group (7.15%), JSC Accept (3.93%) – owned by grandson of Vladimir Putin's uncle Michael Shelomov, JSC Relax (3.65%), "Assistance to Business Initiatives" Non-Commercial Enterprise (3.08%), Russian Federal Property Fund (2.93%).

On December 28, 2006, Fitch Ratings assigned the bank negative ratings (Long Term issuer Default rating B−, Short Term rating B, National Long Term rating BB− (RUS)). As a subsidiary of the bank, ABRos Investment Company, had signed a non-transparent deal aiming to buy a considerable share of the Ren TV Media Holding (see below). During the 2012–13 financial crisis in Cyprus, more than one third (₽26.3 billion) of Rossiya Bank's total cash (₽85.4 billion) was frozen in Cypriot accounts. (Note: In 2013, this was equal to approximately one billion United States dollars.) On June 28, 2013, its major shareholders were Yuri Kovalchuk 30%, Dmitry Gorelov and Nikolai Shamalov 10.5% each, Gennady Timchenko 8%, Gazprom about 16%, Alexei Mordashov 6%. In October 2021, Svetlana Krivonogikh had a 3% stake in Rossiya Bank. In December 2022, Mordashov's Severgroup divested its remaining 5.5% stake in the bank following European Union sanctions.

The U.S. government has characterized Rossiya Bank as Putin's personal cashbox. The Pandora Papers leak revealed that the bank built a network of shadow companies that kept offshore wealth for Russian elites.

==== Sanctions ====
On March 20, 2014, the United States Government Office of Foreign Assets Control added Rossiya Bank to the Specially Designated Nationals List (SDN) as part of sanctions taken in response to the annexation of Crimea by the Russian Federation, placing restrictions on US trade with the bank. Visa and Mastercard stopped processing the bank's payment as a result.

In response, Vladimir Putin announced that he would open a ruble-only account with Bank Rossiya and would make it the primary bank in the newly annexed Crimea as well as giving the right to service payments on Russia's $36 billion wholesale electricity market – which gave the bank $112 million annually from commission charges alone. Bank Rossiya also announced plans to expand into the Crimean market, becoming the first major Russian bank to do so.

As of January 2019, Bank Rossiya had become the most important investor in Russia's development of its annexation of Crimea during the ongoing Russo-Ukrainian War. Through its subsidiary LLC "Yuzhny Proekt", the bank continued heavy investments in the peninsula, acquiring the Novy Svet champagne winery in December 2017 for ₽1.5 billion, the historic Massandra winery in December 2020 for ₽5.33 billion, the Crimean Winemaking Factory in September 2025 for ₽1.85 billion, and purchasing 24 hectares of land in Feodosia for resort development.

On February 22, 2022, British Prime Minister Boris Johnson announced sanctions against five banks, including Rossiya Bank. Additional sanctions prohibiting correspondent banking relationships were imposed in December 2023.

Following the Russian invasion of Ukraine in February 2022, Bank Rossiya was among the first Russian financial institutions to be disconnected from the SWIFT international payment system in March 2022 by the European Union.

== Financial data ==
Date	Asset worth	Rank in Russia
April 1, 2005	₽12.2 billion	68
October 1, 2006	₽30.2 billion	44
April 1, 2010	₽105.9 billion	37
April 1, 2015	₽508 billion	17
October 1, 2020	₽1.072 trillion	14
December 31, 2023	₽1.319 trillion	14

== Ratings and rankings ==
=== Credit ratings ===
Bank Rossiya holds high investment-grade credit ratings on the Russian national scale from major domestic rating agencies. In February 2021, Expert RA assigned the bank a credit rating of "ruAA" with a stable outlook, which it subsequently affirmed in January 2026. Additionally, on June 1, 2026, the Analytical Credit Rating Agency (ACRA) upgraded the bank's long-term credit rating to "AA(RU)" with a stable outlook.

=== Retail deposit rankings ===
In August 2023, the financial analysis portal Brobank.ru ranked Bank Rossiya among the top 10 largest Russian credit institutions by individual deposit volume. The ranking, which assessed banks on parameters such as time deposits and active card accounts, placed the bank's total individual deposits at ₽204.62 billion as of July 2023.

== Management ==
The heads of its board of directors were, in order, Vladimir Kolovay, Andrei Katkov, Yury Kovalchuk, and Dmitry Lebedev. The current head of the board of directors is Mikhail Klishin, who transitioned to this position in June 2023.

Director General and Head of the Management Committee:

- 1993–1995: Vitaly Savelyev
- 1995–1998: Viktor Myachin
- 1998–1999: Mikhail Markov
- 1999–2004: Viktor Myachin
- September 2004 – April 2006: Mikhail Klishin
- April 2006 – June 2012: Dmitry Lebedev
- June 2012 – September 2015: Evgeny Logovinsky
- September 2015 – February 2018: Andrey Khorobrov
- February 2018 – June 2023: Mikhail Klishin
- June 2023 – April 2024: Kirill Krivoshchekov
- April 2024 – present: Tatiana Polinko (appointed acting chair on April 15, 2024; officially confirmed on May 28, 2024)

On September 24, 2004, Viktor Myachin resigned from the Director General position and Mikhail Klishin, who had been the First Deputy Director General and held a 0.197% share, was appointed acting Director General.

On December 10, 2004, Mikhail Klishin was appointed Director General, as the Central Bank of Russia had agreed to this decision.

On April 3, 2006, the board of directors appointed Dmitry Lebedev Director General and Head of the Management Committee. Mikhail Klishin (holder of a 0.159% share) was appointed First Deputy Director General. The Management Committee appointed on that day: Dmitry Lebedev, Oleg Anufriev, Alexander Germanov, Konstantin Gorbachyov, Faniya Kabalina, Mikhail Klishin, Galina Lebedeva, Alexander Markin, Oleg Filatov.

On December 26, 2006, the board of directors of the Bank elected its new Management Committee consisting of Dmitry Lebedev (Head, Director General), Alexander Germanov, Konstantin Gorbachyov, Faniya Kabalina, Mikhail Klishin, Alexander Markin and Boris Tikhonenko.

== Subsidiaries ==
As of 2005, the bank is a shareholder of the following companies:

- JSC ABRos Investment Company (100%)
- JSC Alfa Invest (100%)
- JSC ABR Trust (100%)
- JSC ABR Security Company (100%)
- JSC ZEST (100%)
- JSC Sankt-Peterburgskie Vedomosti Editorial House (20%, increased to 35% in 2005)
- JSC newspaper Sankt-Peterburgskie Vedomosti (20%, increased up to 35% in 2005)
- JSC Fund for Regional Development of St. Petersburg (15%)
- JSC Center for Innovative Management (10%).
- JSC Red Chemist (7.36%).

In January 2005 it turned out that ABRos, a subsidiary of the bank, and Accept, one of its shareholders, held a 49.97% share and a 13.5% share of the insurance group SOGAZ Ltd., respectively after a 49.979% share of the SOGAZ group had been sold by the Russian gas giant Gazprom to an unnamed purchaser for ₽1.69 billion on July 26, 2004, and in August 2004 Gazprom had sold 26% more of SOGAZ for ₽879.3 million.

In November 2005 ABRos Investment Company (chairman of the board of Directors since September 11, 2006: Lyubov Sovershaeva) purchased a 37% share of the Petersburg TV and Radio Company. Also it owns a considerable share of the Media Holding Ren TV (as of December 2006,) On December 18, 2006 Lyubov Sovershaeva also became the chairman of the board of Directors of the Ren TV Media Holding (replacing Alexey Germanovich, a Severstal Group representative).

As of 2008 and later in 2016, Bank Rossiya has large investments in National Media Group (Russian: Национальная Медиа Группа (НМГ)) both directly and indirectly through its 100% ownership of Abros which has a stake in National Media Group.

In August 2010, Sobinbank, an asset of Gazenergobank that had been formed by Alexander Mamut, was acquired by Bank Rossiya when it took over Gazenergobank.

In the summer of 2012, ABR Management was established to manage Bank Rossiya's assets.

In 2016, Bank Rossiya's subsidiaries included Channel One, Channel 5, and Ren TV of the National Media Group CJSC, the leasing group Zest, and Sogaz OJSC.

In 2018, Bank Rossiya, Yuri Kovalchuk and Nikolai Shamalov through their investments in the National Media Group and its 100% ownership of Synerdzhy LLC (Russian: ООО "Синерджи") and Otkrytie TV LLC (Russian: OOO Открытие ТВ) which is 100% owned by Media Alians (or Alyans) LLC (Russian: OOO Медиа Альянс) in which Bank Rossiya has an 80% stake, have close relationships with the John C. Malone associated Liberty Media.

In August 2017, Bank Rossiya, through its subsidiary Sobinbank, was appointed as the rescue investor (sanator) of Crimea-based Genbank, acquiring 99.99% of its shares. At the time, Genbank was the second-largest bank in Crimea with 190 branches. On October 28, 2020, Sobinbank was legally merged into Genbank, making Bank Rossiya the direct rescue investor and parent company of Genbank.

Beginning on January 20, 2020, the processing center of JSC AB Russia (Russian: АО «АБ «РОССИЯ») provides processing services for the issue of bank payment cards and support for acquiring projects of Evrofinance Mosnarbank.
