= Andrey Yakunin =

Russian-British businessman

- Born: Andrey Vladimirovich Yakunin; 1975 (age 50–51); Russia
- Citizenship: Dual citizen of Russia and Britain (since 2015)
- Education: St. Petersburg State University
- Occupation: Businessman
- Employer: VIY Management
- Children: 2
- Relatives: Vladimir Yakunin (father); Viktor Yakunin (brother)

Andrey Vladimirovich Yakunin (Russian: Андрей Владимирович Якунин) (born 1975) is a Russian-British businessman. He is the eldest son of Vladimir Yakunin, the former head of Russian Railways. Despite his father's links to Putin, Andrey has publicly expressed his "strong opposition" to Russia's 2022 invasion and occupation of Ukraine multiple times. Andrey received his British citizenship in 2015, after moving to the UK in 2007.

== Early life and education ==
Andrey Yakunin is the eldest son of Vladimir and has one brother, Viktor Yakunin. Yakunin's family moved to New York, NY in 1985. There, his father worked at the Soviet Mission and the United Nations that he combined with his activities as a Soviet Intelligence officer. After returning to Russia with his family in 1991, Yakunin studied Mathematical Methods in Economics at the St. Petersburg State University, graduating in 1997. He went on to earn his PhD in credit and finance from the same university in 2001, and he also taught at St. Petersburg State University. Yakunin co-founded the St. Petersburg State University Alumni Association in 2014 and served as its president until 2020. Yakunin also holds a joint MBA from London Business School and Columbia University.

== Career ==
Yakunin co-founded VIY Management, later VIYM, a private equity and real estate investment company, in 2006 with British-Israeli investor Yair Ziv. The firm invested in real estate, hospitality, and consumer businesses, including hotel developments in Russia, the agro-industrial group Agro-Alliance, and the Russian chocolatier French Kiss. In 2015, Forbes Russia reported that VIYM planned to divest its stake in Agro-Alliance.

From 2013 to 2018, Yakunin was chairman of the National Alternative Investment Management Association in Russia. In March 2022, amid expanding sanctions after Russia's invasion of Ukraine, The Wall Street Journal reported that Yakunin said he had never worked in Russia's public sector, had never received special benefits from the Russian government, and had never supported President Vladimir Putin. He later told bne IntelliNews that he opposed the invasion and had moved away from investment positions in Russia.

VIYM's Russian hospitality investments included the Four Seasons Hotel Lion Palace in St Petersburg and the Nikolsky Ryady development. RBC reported that the Four Seasons Hotel Lion Palace changed ownership in 2024, and that Nikolsky Ryady had also been sold by 2025.

Yakunin was also associated with Antognolla Resort & Residences in Umbria, Italy, where he served as chairman of the board of directors. In October 2025, Il Sole 24 Ore reported that investor Mohamed Alabbar had acquired Antognolla from Yakunin.

Yakunin has dual British and Russian citizenship.

== Norway drone case ==
Yakunin was arrested in Norway on 17 October 2022, during a sailing trip in Svalbard, and charged with violating Norwegian sanctions regulations by flying a recreational drone. Prosecutors argued that sanctions imposed after Russia's 2022 invasion of Ukraine barred Russian citizens from operating drones in Norwegian airspace.

Yakunin was initially acquitted by the Nord-Troms and Senja District Court and the Hålogaland Court of Appeal. In June 2023, the Supreme Court of Norway overturned the acquittal, ruling that drones were covered by the sanctions regulation's reference to aircraft, and sent the case back to the district court.

After the case returned to the district court, Yakunin was again acquitted. The prosecution appealed, but the Court of Appeal refused to hear the appeal, ending the criminal case. In October 2024, he was awarded NOK 2.7 million in compensation for legal expenses following the acquittal.
