= Vladimir Stolyarenko =

Russian banker

- Born: 26 February 1961 (age 65); Leningrad, USSR (now St. Petersburg, Russia)
- Occupations: Banker and financier
- Spouse: Alfiya Stolyarenko

Vladimir Stolyarenko (born 26 February 1961) is a Russian banker who was the president and chairman of the executive board of Evrofinance Mosnarbank from June 2006 to 2012.

== Early life and education ==
Stolyarenko was born on 26 February 1961 in Leningrad, USSR. In 1983, he graduated with honors from the Faculty of Finance and Banking of the Leningrad Institute of Finance and Economics (now St. Petersburg State University of Economics). In 1987, he graduated from the Moscow Financial Institute in the Department of International Finance and Global Banking.

== Career ==
Stolyarenko was an assistant professor at the Department of Money and Banking and associate professor at the Department of International Business at St. Petersburg State Economic University from 1987 to 1993. From 1990 to 1993, Stolyarenko headed the Russian office of the Paris-based consulting and auditing firm SECAFI, also called Alpha-Secafi or Secafi Alpha SA, which is a subsidiary of the Alpha Group (French: Groupe Alpha), established in December 1983 and owned by Pierre Ferracci.

Stolyarenko was senior vice president of the Leningrad (Saint Petersburg) branch of the bank JSB Imperial (Russian: АБ «Империал») from 1993 to 1998. Imperial focused on oil and natural gas supplies to East Germany, and later to Germany, including the oil-for-pipes program.

For two months starting 8 May 1998, Vladimir Stolyarenko headed the provisional administration of Tokobank (Russian: Токобанк), introduced by the Bank of Russia.

After working in the bank, Stolyarenko focused on the implementation of investment projects and research activities. Stolyarenko holds Ph.D. in Economics and Doctorate in Law. He also completed a post-graduate program at Harvard Law School, an Executive MBA Program at Columbia University Graduate School of Business and London Business School, as well as an Advance Management Program at Harvard Business School.

In 2003 Stolyarenko led the merger between Evrofinance and Mosnarbank, a Russian subsidiary of the London-based Moscow Narodny Bank. Evrofinance Mosnarbank was created as a result of this merger and was headed by Stolyarenko as president-chairman of the executive board until he retired in 2012.

== Awards ==
- In 2007 he was awarded the title of "Best Banker of Russia" (diploma of the 1st degree) according to the magazine "Company", Russia.
- In 2012, awarded the Order of Honor (for the achieved labor achievements and long-term conscientious work).
- Commendation of the President of the Russian Federation Vladimir Putin for his services in the preparation and holding of the meeting of the heads of state and government of the G8 member countries in St. Petersburg, 2006.

== Links ==
- Vladimir Stolyarenko, profile on Higher School of Economics
- People | Harvard Law School Program on International Financial Systems
- Владимир Михайлович Столяренко (in Russian)
