= Igora =

Resort in Russia

- resort
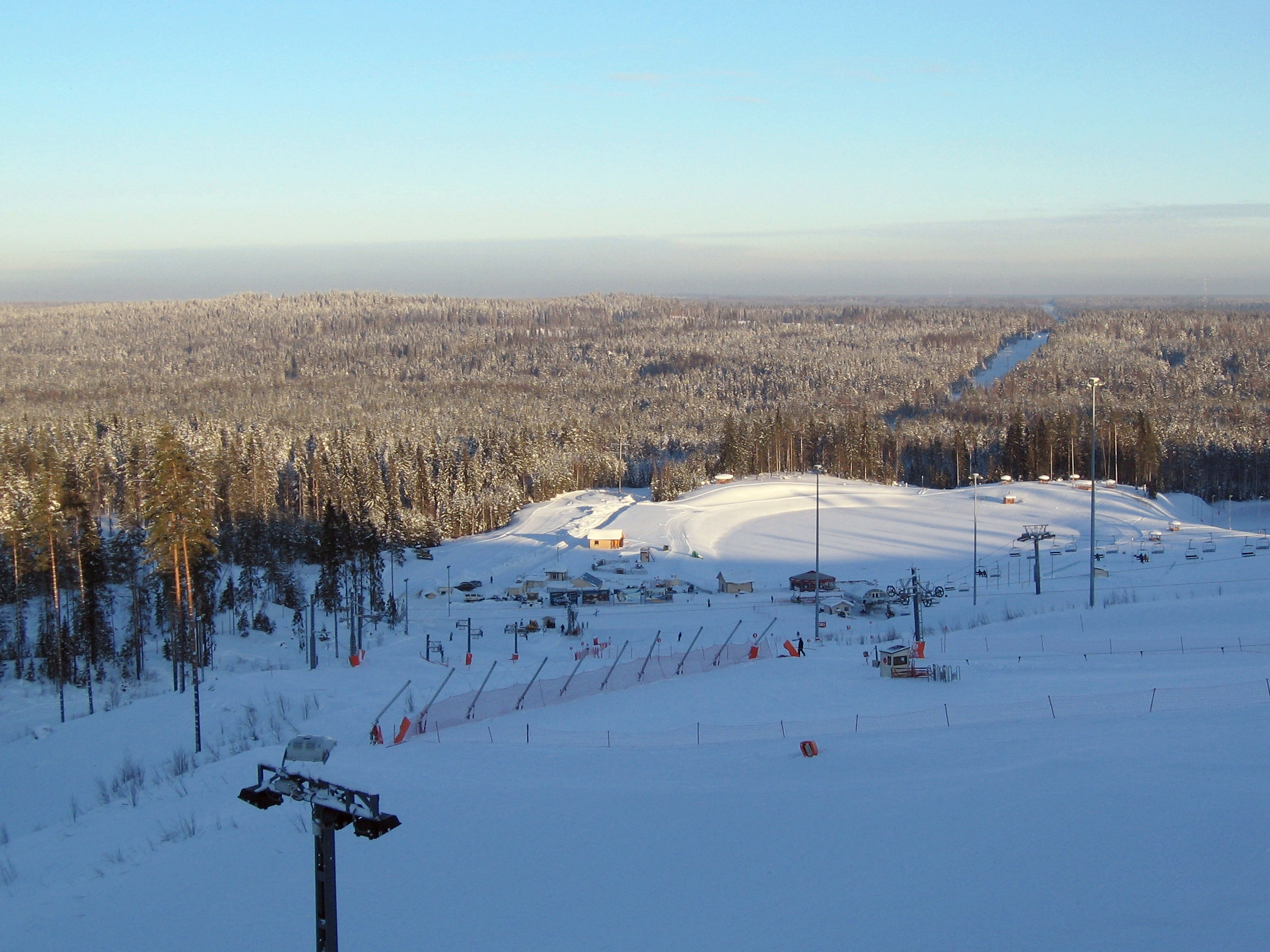

- Coordinates: 60°30′52″N 30°12′37″E
- Country: Russia
- Website: igora.ru

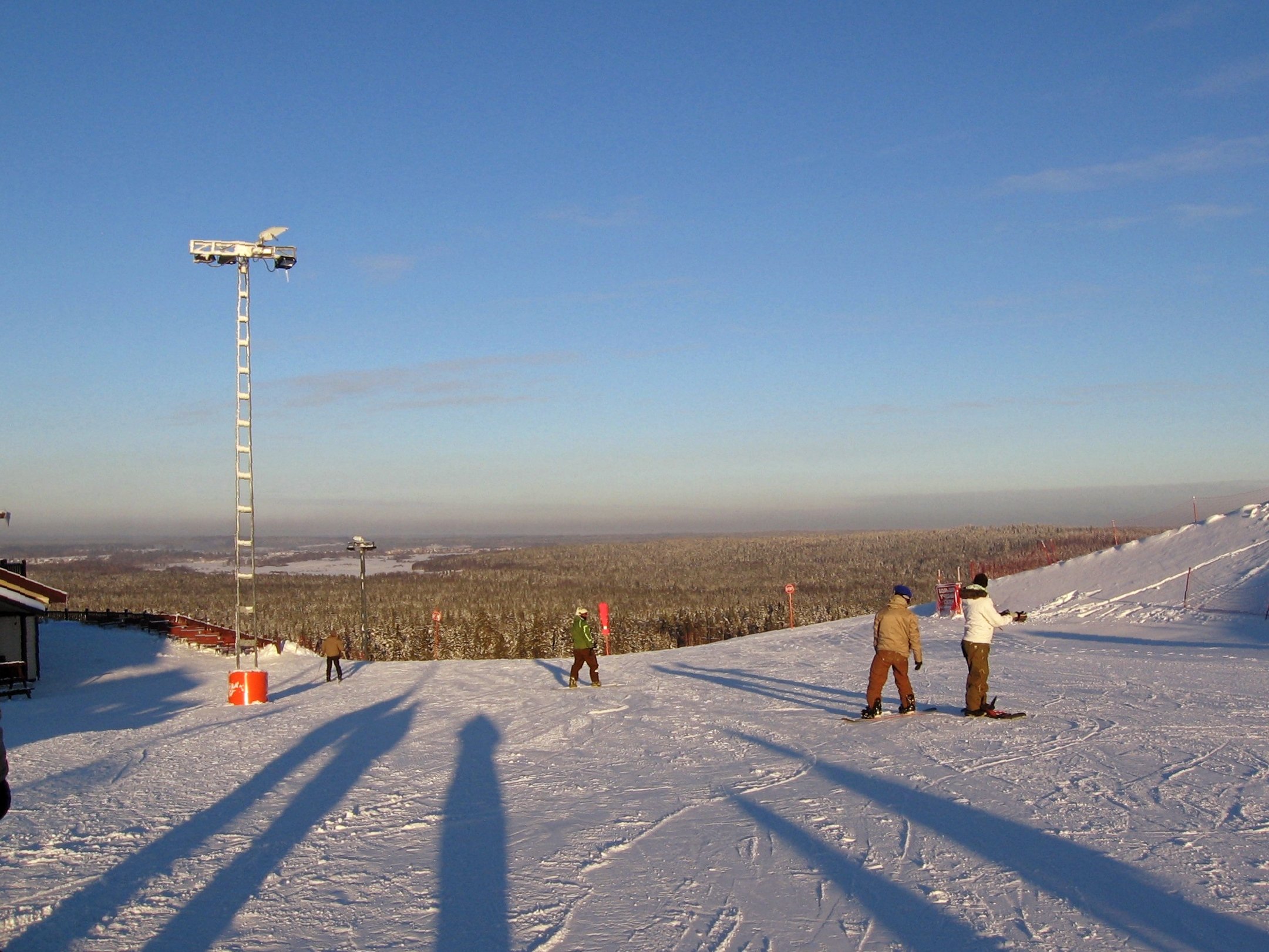
Igora.

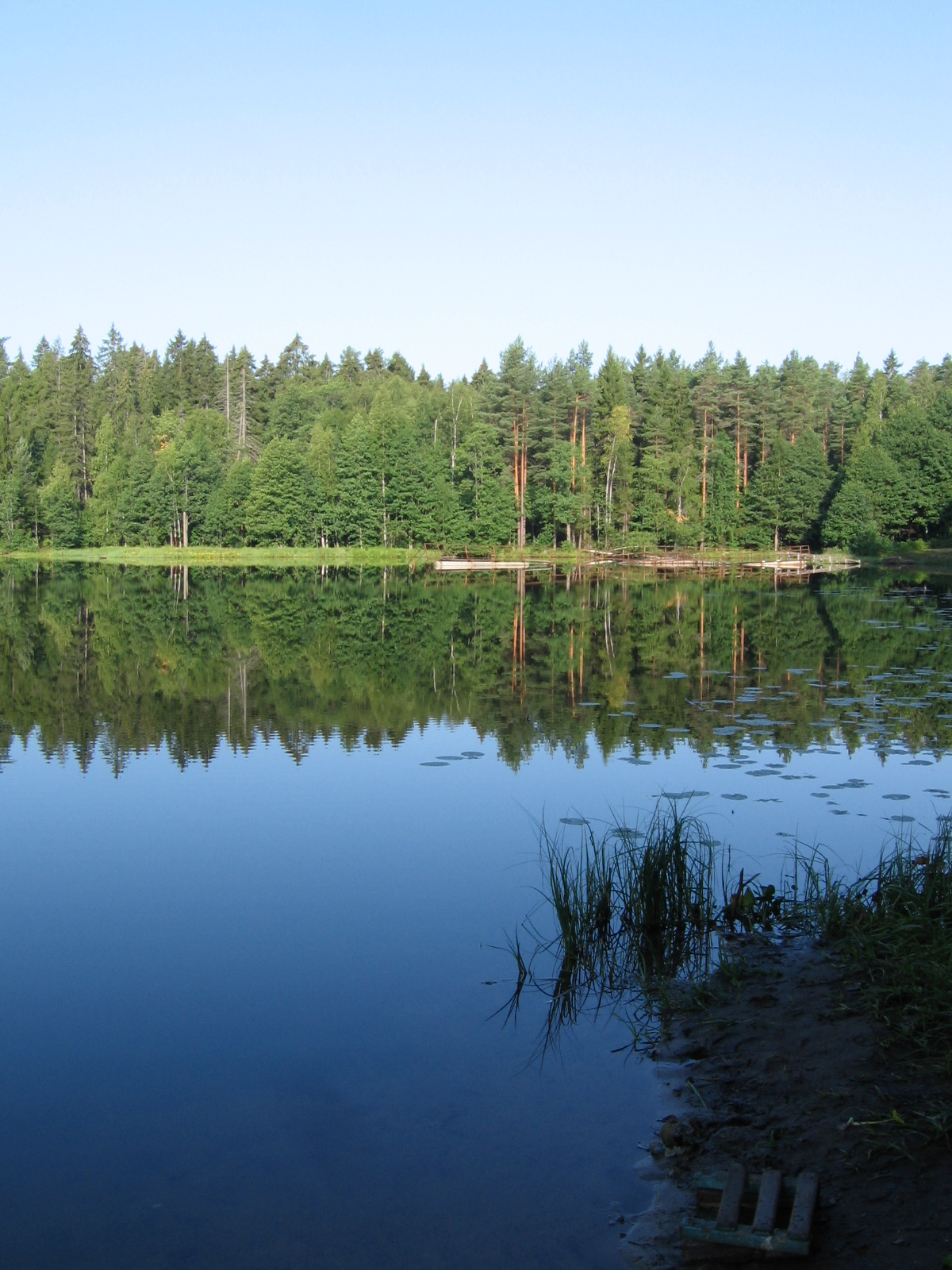
Lake.

Igora is a year-round resort in the Leningrad Oblast, Russia. There's a multifunctional area for outdoor activities and spa complex. The resort is located on the 54th kilometer of the Priozersky highway, in the Priozersky District of Leningrad Oblast, in the immediate vicinity of the village of Sosnovo. It is named after the local Lake Igora.

== History ==
The resort was opened on January 28, 2006, with Ozon LLC as its original owner.

== Official competitions ==
The resort has international certification for parallel slalom competitions.

== Extreme Park ==
In the winter season, the Igora ski resort built a park for skiers and snowboarders. Usually, the park was divided into 3 zones: halfpipe zone, slopestyle zone with jumps and a jibbing zone with a variety of handrails and boxes. In the extreme park there were competitions for professionals and amateurs, such as: Igora Sun Pipe, Igora Rail Jam, and Igora Snow Sapiens.

== Racing complex ==
In 2019, the Igora Drive racing complex, designed by Herman Tilke, was opened in Igora along with Igora Rail Jam and Igora Snow Sapiens
