= Lake Komsomolskoye =

Lake in Leningrad, Russia

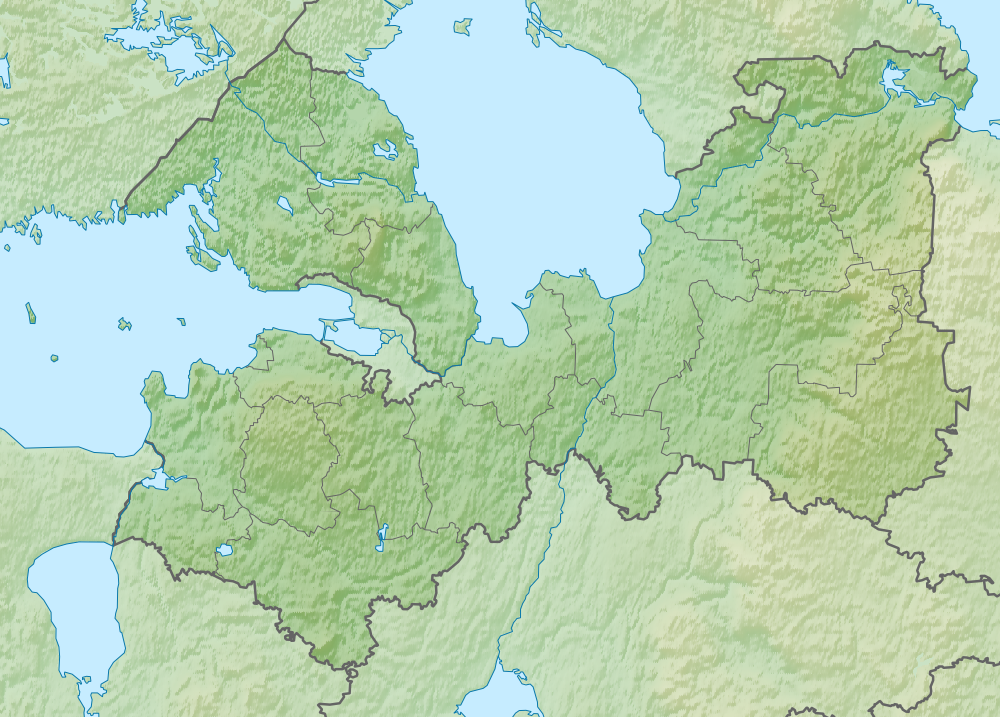
- Location within Leningrad Oblast
- Coordinates: 60°47′N 30°04′E
- Type: moraine lake
- Primary inflows: Pionerka River
- Primary outflows: Vuoksi River
- Catchment area: 399 km^{2} (200 sq mi)
- Basin countries: Russia
- Max. length: 14 km (9 mi)
- Max. width: 2 km (1 mi)
- Surface area: 24.6 km^{2} (9 sq mi)
- Average depth: 10 m (33 ft)
- Max. depth: 19.6 m (64 ft)
- Water volume: 246 km^{3} (59 cu mi)
- Surface elevation: 13 m (43 ft)
- Islands: 46
- Settlements: Solovyovka; Torfyanoye

Lake Komsomolskoye is a lake in the north of the Leningrad Region Priozersky District, in the middle of the Karelian Isthmus of north western Russia. Until 1948 it was called Kiimajärvi (Finnish Kiimajärvi).

== Description ==
Lake Komsomolskoye is 14 km (8.7 mi) long, 2 km (1.2 mi) miles wide, with a surface area of 24.6 km^{2} (9 sq mi). The main inflow of Lake Komsomolskoye is from the Pionerka River. In the south, a small stream flows into Lake Komsomolskoye. At the northern end, Lake Komsomolskoye is drained by the Vesyolaya River which flows into the Vuoksi River near the village of Vasilyevo. The lake is divided into three plains by two narrowings. The North Pole occupies part of the basin with depths of 6 to 10 meters. There is a small group of islands. Central reach is the deepest, with depressions up to 19.6 meters, the southern shallow, with gentle underwater slopes.

The coastal shallows of the lake are covered with a mixture of sand and silt, the bottom in deep sections is covered with a thick layer of light brown mud. With the exception of the bays, the lake is overgrown with little: the width of the green border near the coast is 10–20 meters.

== Geography ==
Ancylus Lake around 7,000 BC.

Geologically Lake Komsomolskoye is part of the Lake Ladoga depression, a graben and syncline structure of Proterozoic age (Precambrian). Deglaciation following the Weichsel glaciation took place in the Lake Ladoga basin between 12,500 and 11,500 radiocarbon years BP. During the existence of Lake Komsomolskoye there have been three sharp drops in the water level, so that the shore consists of small but distinctive terraces formed on the banks. The shores of the lake are indented with several bays and inlets, overgrown with sedges and reeds. On the south-eastern shore of the lake is the village of Solovyovka. At the northern extremity of the lake are the houses of the village of Torfyanoye.

== Notoriety ==
Part of the shore is fenced by the dacha cooperative Ozero, among the founders of which was Vladimir Putin. Access to this territory is closed in violation of the Russian law.
