= Sogaz =

Russian insurance company

SOGAZ
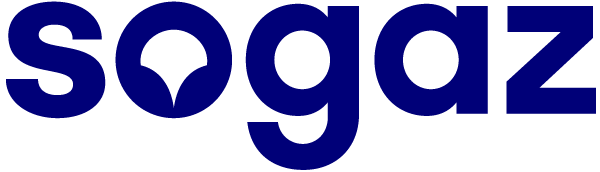

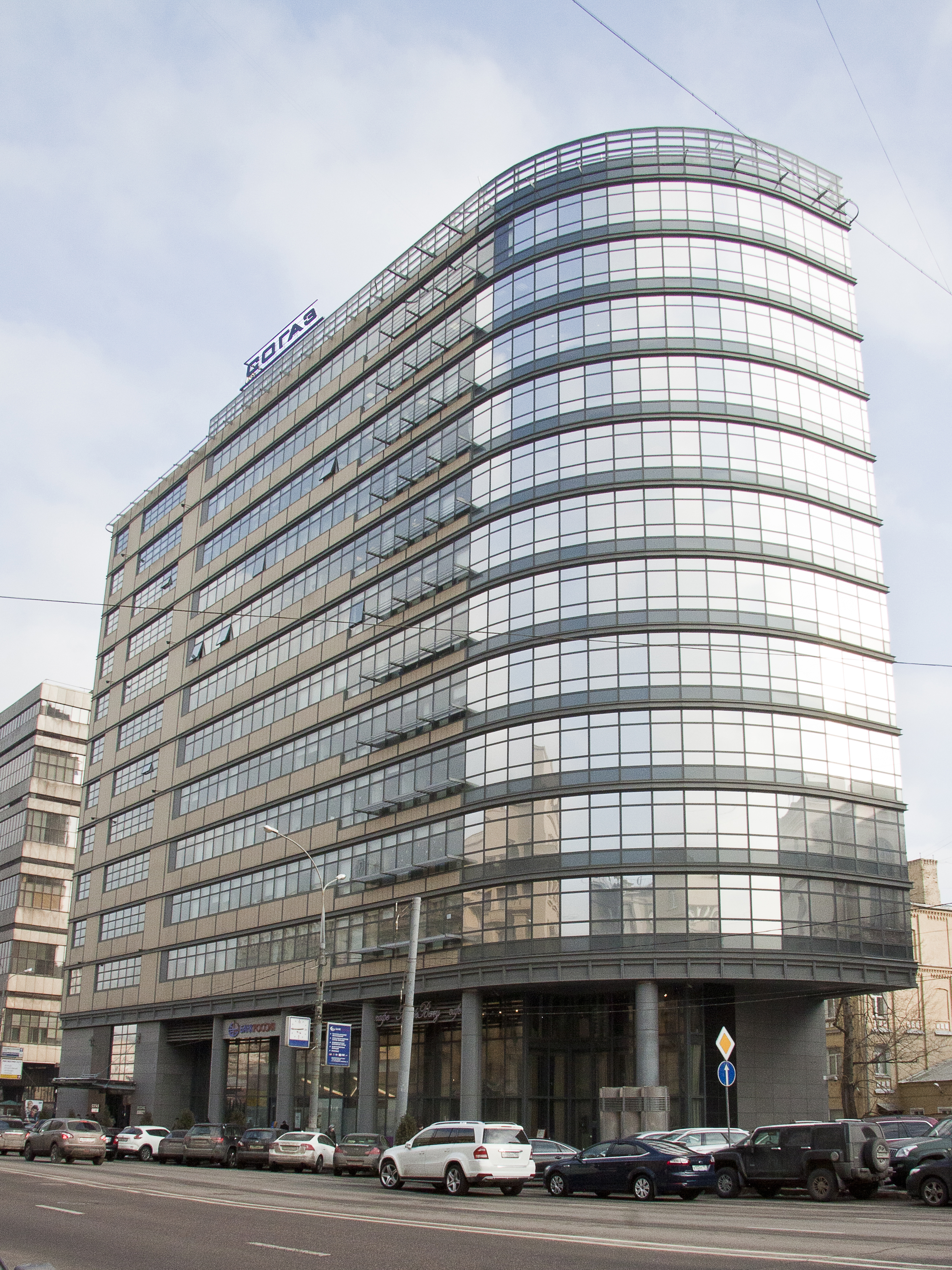
- Company type: Joint-Stock Company
- Industry: Insurance
- Founded: October 25, 1993; 32 years ago in Moscow, Russia
- Founder: Gazprom
- Headquarters: Moscow, Russia
- Area served: Nationwide
- Key people: Anton Ustinov (CEO)
- Revenue: $3.07 billion (2017)
- Operating income: $675 million (2017)
- Net income: $524 million (2017)
- Total assets: $6.09 billion (2017)
- Total equity: $1.88 billion (2017)
- Number of employees: 12,200
- Subsidiaries: SOGAZ-Life, SOGAZ-Med, SOGAZ-MedService, SOGAZ a.d.o. Novi Sad, SOGAZ International Healthcare Center, SOGAZ-Finance, SOGAZ-Broker, Accept (REN TV),
- Website: https://www.sogaz.ru/eng

SOGAZ is a Russian insurance company. SOGAZ became the first in Russia by written premium (₽142.8 billion or US$2.3 billion) and market share (12.1%) in 2016. The company was formed in 1993 and has direct business in Russia and Serbia. Insurance company SOGAZ as well have shares in many companies and own a number of insurers.

SOGAZ partners were leading worldwide reinsurance companies: Munich Re, Hannover Re, Partner Re, Swiss Re, SCOR SE, Lloyd's of London, and others. SOGAZ, in accordance with national laws, cedes 10% of total ceded risks under insurance contracts to Russian National Reinsurance Company (RNRC).

== Sanctions ==
European Union companies were banned from doing business with Sogaz in March 2022.

Sogaz came under international sanctions from the European Union for insuring a bridge in Crimea.

On March 15, 2022, Sogaz came under UK sanctions, the company's accounts were frozen, and UK residents were prohibited from conducting financial activities with Sogaz. On October 28, 2022, Sogaz was included in Canada's sanctions list.

On June 12, 2024, Sogaz was included in the US blocking sanctions list against the "architecture of the Russian financial system of Russia", as a company that provides insurance to Russian military personnel and employees of leading defense enterprises under sanctions.

For similar reasons, Sogaz is under sanctions from Switzerland, New Zealand, Ukraine and Australia.

== Credit ratings ==
SOGAZ become the first Russian insurer assigned a long-term credit rating "BBB+" in Russian and foreign currency with a "stable" outlook by Dagong Chinese Rating Agency. A.M. Best has affirmed for SOGAZ (Russia) the Financial Strength Rating of "B++" (Good) and the Long-Term Issuer Credit Rating of "bbb" and revised the outlooks to "stable" from "negative".

Standard & Poor's

The Standard & Poor's rating agency first assigned SOGAZ a long-term insurer financial strength and issuer credit ratings in 2008. Since then, the ratings has gradually grown and in 2018 the agency assigned a ratings of "BBB" with a "stable" outlook, which was then annually confirmed. At the beginning of 2021, the company had a 'BBB" ratings with "stable" outlook».

Expert RA

In July 2003, the Expert RA rating agency assigned SOGAZ the highest "A++" rating (by national rating scale). Since then, the rating has never been reduced and in July 2017, when switching to a new rating scale, it was replaced with the “ruAAA” rating. At the beginning of 2022, the rating was “ruAAA”, the outlook is “stable”.

== Acquisitions ==
SOGAZ carries out a consistent and active policy on the purchase of attractive insurance assets. The objects of such purchases are always captive insurers and insurance companies focused on corporate insurance, except VTB Insurance which had been a subsidiary of VTB Bank. SOGAZ acquired 7 notable companies in the Russian insurance market:

- Neftepolis (2005, formerly owned by Rosneft);
- Sheksna (2009, Severstal);
- Insurance company Transneft (2013, Transneft);
- Insurance company Alrosa (2014, Alrosa);
- ZHASO (2016, Russian Railways);
- Regiongarant (2017, Surgutex);
- VTB Insurance (2018, VTB Bank).

In December 2021 SOGAZ has also acquired all 45% indirect stake of USM, headed by Alisher Usmanov, in VK (company), mentioned as a strategic investment for the buyer.
