= Nikolai Shamalov =

Belarusian-born Russian dentist, businessman, and a founding member of Ozero

- Born: 24 January 1950 (age 76); Byelorussian SSR, Soviet Union
- Citizenship: Russian
- Occupations: Dentist; businessman
- Children: Yuri Shamalov; Kirill Shamalov

Nikolai Terent'yevich Shamalov, Nikolai Terent'evich Shamalov or Nikolai Terentievich Shamalov (Russian: Николай Терентьевич Шамалов; born 24 January 1950) is a Belarusian-born Russian dentist, businessman, and a founding member of Ozero. He is a close confidant of Russian leader Vladimir Putin. Shamalov grew rich after obtaining a stake in Bank Rossiya.

== Education ==
Shamalov is a dentist/physician by training. He is fluent in German.

== Career ==
Until the 1990s, Shamalov worked as a dentist in Leningrad (Saint Petersburg). In 1994, he founded the company Masterdentservis (Russian: "Мастердентсервис") in Leningrad.

Shamalov was a representative of Siemens in St. Petersburg from 1992 to 2008 selling medical equipment for Siemens Medical Systems. According to Sergei Kolesnikov, Shamalov refused to answer questions by Siemens internal investigators about money laundering, corruption, and bribery. (Note: Kolesnikov said that Nikolai Shamalov was dismissed "when he refused to answer questions during the internal corporate investigation regarding alleged bribery" (Russian: когда отказался отвечать на вопросы в ходе внутреннего корпоративного расследования в отношении предполагаемого взяточничества).) This led to Shamalov's dismissal from Siemens.

From 1993 to 1995, he worked in the Committee on External Relations of the St. Petersburg Mayor's Office. Vladimir Putin was his boss. (Note: The Committee on External Relations (KVS) (Russian: комитет внешних связей (квс)) was also called the Committee for Foreign Liaison, and the Committee for Foreign Economic Relations.)

In January 1992, AOZT/ZAO Petromed was founded with 51% of its shares owned by the Saint Petersburg's Committee on External Relations (KVS) which Putin headed, 39% of its shares owned by the Center for International Cooperation which is headed by Dmitri Gorelov, and 10% of its shares owned by the Saint Petersburg Committee on Health. Andrey Kolesnikov, a biophysicist from the Polytechnic Institute, formed a cooperative to manufacture medical equipment for Petromed. In 1993, Shamalov was hired by Putin as the Petromed's purchasing agent for Siemens medical equipment from Germany instead of buying from Kolesnikov's cooperative's Russian manufactured equipment. Over many years, Petromed received state funds for the purchase of medical equipment, but Putin also demanded that Russian oligarchs make charitable contributions to Petromed for the purchase of medical equipment. However, Shamalov greatly inflated the purchase price of the medical equipment and then funneled 33% of the money to offshore accounts. After Vladimir Yakovlev, who was the Governor of Saint Petersburg, became a very outspoken critic of Petromed, Putin, and corruption, Gorelev and Kolesnikov bought out the Saint Petersburg Committee on Health portion of Petromed and became the only two owners of Petromed. Later, Gorelov, Kolesnikov, and Shamalov used the funneled money, which they obtained as overcharges to Petromed, to purchase shares in Rossiya Bank, Vyborg Shipyard, and other entities.

On 10 November 1996, he was a founding member of Vladimir Putin's closed gate community, the cooperative Ozero. As of 2016, Shamalov has remained a member of the cooperative Ozero.

In early 1997 and previously, Shamalov's family and the family of Vladimir Putin and Lyudmila Ocheretnaya vacationed together in Davos, Switzerland.

In 2004, he, Yuri Kovalchuk, and Dmitry Vladimirovich Gorelov became co-owners of Bank Rossiya. Shamalov has the second-largest stake in Bank Rossiya.

On 18 October 2005, he, Sergei Kolesnikov, and Gorelov founded Rosinvest. (Note: Rosinvest was owned through the Liechtenstein firm Lirus Management AG under the company Lirus Investment Holding AG. Kolesnikov argues that Lirus is owned entirely by Vladimir Putin before Rosinvest liquidated in 2012. Jürg Wissmann, who was on the board of directors at Lirus and Perfora AG, stated that Shamalov, Kolesnikov, and Gorelov were the only owners of Lirus. Lirus Investment Holding AG was established on 17 January 2003, and went into liquidation on 19 December 2017. Perfora AG was established on 13 April 2000, and went was liquidated on 25 March 2014.) Using money that Shamalov had funneled from Petromed to offshore accounts (Note: Kolesnikov argues that the offshore accounts were in Liechtenstein, British Virgin Islands, Belize, and Panama.) and money that was from the Russian state treasury, this company built the health resort in Gelendzhik known as "Putin's Palace" which was part of "project south" (Russian: Проекту Юг). To finance "Putin's Palace", Shamalov's expertise in selling medical equipment through Siemens in St Petersburg was essential in obtaining several hundreds of millions of dollars out of the $1 billion intended for Russian healthcare improvements. Shamalov is the original legal owner of "Putin's Palace."

In 2006, he became a co-owner with a controlling share (10%) of Vyborg Shipyard. Dmitri Gorelov's son Vasili Gorelov is another owner of Vyborg Shipyard.

In 2010, he, his son Kirill, and Oleg Vitalyevich Sharykin (Russian: Олег Витальевич Шарыкин) became co-owners of the Russian Cement Company (Russian: Русскую цементную компанию (РЦК)). (Note: The Russian Cement Company is not part of Rostec (Russian: "Ростех").) Nikolai owns a 12.5% share. Kirill owns a 5% share and is on the board of directors. The Shamalov's combined stake is estimated to be 15 billion rubles in 2018.

In 2011, to support the Russian Defense Ministry, Roscosmos, and ROSATOM, (Note: ROSATOM was established in November 2007. It was formerly known as MinAtom.) he and Oleg Sharykin formed the joint company Ceramic Technologies (Russian: совместную компанию "Керамические технологии") (Note: Gennady Ivanovich Babayants (Russian: Геннадий Иванович Бабаянц b. 1934) founded Ceramic Technologies. Previously, he headed the Luch Scientific Production Association (Russian: ФГУП "НИИ НПО "Луч"") from 1990 to 2004. He is currently the Lebedev Physical Institute's director of optics at the Troitsk Technopark.) which has two main projects: (1) the creation of silicon carbide pencil boxes for the long-term storage and disposal of highly radioactive nuclear waste in underground sites and (2) the development and production of silicon carbide optical blocks in telescopes and sensors used in remote sensing surveillance satellites, which also can detect asteroid hazards and explore deep space. Ceramic Technologies is a member of the Lebedev Institute of Physics (FIAN) through the Troitsk Technopark (Russian: Троицкий технопарк ФИАН) and the Skolkovo Foundation but receives no investment and no funding from either. Also, Sharykin said that we have in Kemerovo "Khimprom" (Russian: "Химпром") and PO "Tokem" (Russian: "Токем"), which competes with Lanxess, Dow Chemical, and Mitsubishi Chemical for monodisperse copolymers in resin ion exchangers for nuclear reactors at nuclear power plants, nuclear-powered ships (both icebreakers and submarines), and water treatment in the chemical and metallurgical industries. As of October 2015, ROSATOM purchases 40% of its needs for resin ion exchangers from NATO countries, but the Kemerovo production sites are expected to meet 100% of ROSATOM needs by 2017.

Between 2010 and 2016 with support from Bank Rossiya, he became the beneficial owner of land in Karelia near Ladoga in the Lakhdenpokhsky District.

On 28 June 2013, he was the second-largest shareholder in Bank Rossiya owning around 10.5% of the total shares.

According to the Panama Papers, his Bank Rossiya staff in St Petersburg sent all their confidential instructions through a firm of Swiss attorneys in Zurich, Dietrich Baumgartner and Partners, to have Mossack Fonseca (Mossfon) establish a British Virgin Islands shell company, Sandalwood Continental Ltd, to hide large sums of Vladimir Putin's personal wealth that had been in bank accounts at the Russian Commercial Bank (RCB) of Cyprus, which is a bank owned by VTB and is now known as RCB Bank. (Note: Offshore shell companies were established through Mossfon in the British Virgin Islands, Belize, and Panama.) Some of this money was transferred from Sergei Roldugin's Sandalwood Continental Ltd to Ozon LLC (Note: Viktor Myachin, Yuri Kovalchuk and Yuri's son, Boris Kovalchuk, own 25% of Ozon while Lowbrook Trading of Cyprus, which was established on 3 March 1999, owned the remaining 75% until Lowbrook dissolved on 11 November 2016.) to purchase and develop the Igora ski resort. (Note: Located along the Priozerskoe highway (Russian: Приозерское шоссе; A-121) at the 54 km marker near Sosnovo (Russian: Сосно́во) in the Priozersky District of the Leningrad Oblast, Igora has a movie theater, a grand café, a bistro, the Chalet restaurant, a sushi bar, a panoramic restaurant, a lobby bar, a spa, a Russian banya, and a pool. Activities include a small lake, laser tag, test driving a racing car, a bowling alley, curling, the largest snowboarding park in central Russia and a large ice palace (Russian: "Ледовый дворец"). Established in 2006 with financing from Rossiya Bank, Igora is a combination of two Russian nouns: igra (Russian: игра), play, and gora (Russian: гора), mountain. Katerina Tikhonova and Kirill Shamalov were married at this resort in February 2013.) (Note: Owned by Yuri and Boris Kovalchuk, a very secure compound known as "the president's villa" or "Putin's residence" (Russian: Загородная среда) is nearby Igora.)

According to Sergei Kolesnikov, Shamalov gives Vladimir Putin updates on the status of Putin's offshore wealth and hidden accounts usually two or three times a year.

As of 2018, his relationships with various entities and individuals and be found in this image.

As of January 2019, Shamalov and Yuri Kovalchuk through their ownership of Rossiya Bank have become the most important investors in Russia's development of its illegal annexation of Crimea during the ongoing Russo-Ukrainian War.

His nickname is Professor Filip Filippovich Preobrazhensky (Russian: Профессор Филипп Филиппович Преображенский) or the "Professor of the Transfiguration," who was the central character that transforms from a stray dog into a New Soviet man in Mikhail Bulgakov’s Heart of a Dog.

== Personal wealth ==
In 2011, he was listed as the 198th richest Russian with a wealth of $500 million by Forbes. Shamalov owns a house at Gelendzhik near Putin's Palace.

He is on the billionaires (rubles) group with Delovoy Peterburg.

== Sanctions ==
Because of the ongoing Russian interference in Ukraine and Shamalov's close personal relationship's with Vladimir Putin, Shamalov has been under sanctions by the European Union since 30 July 2014, Liechtenstein since 31 July 2014, Canada since 2 August 2014, Switzerland since 27 August 2014, Australia since 2 September 2014, and Ukraine, since 17 October 2016. These sanctions both freeze his assets in the European Union, Liechtenstein, Switzerland, Ukraine, Canada, and Australia, and also restrict his travel rights.

He was sanctioned by the UK government in 2014 in relation to the Russo-Ukrainian War.

== Personal life ==
Located at 2nd Berezovaya Alley, 19 on Kamenny Island at Saint Petersburg, Nikolai Shamalov owns an apartment which is near apartments owned by his neighbors which include Arkady Rotenberg, the former head of the presidential administration Vladimir Kozhin and Yuri Kovalchuk and, located on the same alley at building 13-15, Sergei Mironov, the wife and daughter of Viktor Zubkov and other powerful and wealthy persons own apartments.

Shamalov has two sons.

=== Yuri Shamalov ===
Yuri Shamalov (born 10 June 1970 in Saint Petersburg) worked under Vladimir Putin and with Yuri's father Nikolai on the foreign economic relations committee (KVS) for the city of Saint Petersburg from October 1993 to October 1995. He was a Siemens sales representative for Moscow from February 1997 to July 2003. He was the first vice president for Gazfond from July to August 2003. From 1987 to 2007, Yuri Shamalov was in the KGB and later FSB. He was the Chairman of the Supervisory Board of Gazprom-Media from July 2008 to June 2012, the Chairman of the Supervisory Board of OJSC Gaz-Service from November 2008 to February 2015, the Chairman of the Supervisory Board of OAO Gazkon from November 2008 to February 2015, the Chairman of the Supervisory Board of PJSC Gaz-Tek from October 2011 to February 2015, (Note: Gaz-Service (Russian: ОАО "Газ-сервис"), Gazkon (Russian: ОАО "Газкон"), and Gaztek (Russian: ОАО "Газ-Тек") through Northern Keys (Russian: ЗАО "Северные ключи") are owned and managed by the Leader management company (Russian: ЗАО "Лидер"). Since 2005, the private company GazTek has become the largest owner of the state companies for city and regional (Russian: облгаз) natural gas distribution in Ukraine. Dmitri Firtash through his Krezer Holdings Limited, Nesiba Venchers Limited, Pasler Enterprises Limited, and Porala Venchers Limited, which are his Cypriot holding companies, is closely associated with these companies.) and the Deputy Chairman of the Supervisory Board OJSC Gazprombank from June 2008 to December 2014. He is currently the Deputy chairman on the Supervisory Board of JSC Gazprombank, since December 2014; a board member of Gazprom Media, since August 2008; the Chairman of the Supervisory Board of Gazprombank-Fund, since July 2007; and the President of Gazfond, since August 2003. Since March 2014, through his relationship with Gazfond and its controlling interest in Leader Assets Management, he has the controlling interest at JSC Gazprombank. Since November 2014 and through his chairmanship of Gasfond, he is the majority shareholder of Gazprombank which controls Gazprom-Media. (Note: After Gazprom-Media took over "Media Most" in 2000, Gazprom-Media received Filipp Bobkov's entire former KGB 5th directorate (Political police) which was responsible for disinformation, control of dissidents, and executions including all of its employees, its database and the Filipp Bobkov founded security service that was accused of attempting an assassination in 1994 of Boris Berezovsky. The 5th KGB Main Directorate archives were taken to Media-Most.)

Yuri Shamalov has degrees from the Higher Naval Engineering College V. I. Lenin in 1992 in naval engineering and from the All-Russian Academy of Foreign Trade of the Ministry of Foreign Economic Relations of the Russian Federation in 1996 in foreign trade.

=== Kirill Shamalov ===
Kirill Shamalov (born 22 March 1982 in Saint Petersburg) is a deputy chairman on SIBUR's management board, a vice-president of Sibur Holding, (Note: According to analysts with Raiffeizenbank at the end of 2017, Kirill Shamalov was worth $12–14 billion through his assets with Sibur.) which is a Russian gas processing and petrochemicals company headquartered in Moscow, and was married to Putin's second daughter Katerina Tikhonova from 2013 to 2018. In April 2018, the United States imposed sanctions on his son Kirill Shamalov and 23 other Russian nationals due to the Russian interference in Ukraine and to prevent Vladimir Putin and his close inner circle's next generation of relatives from gaining wealth. (Note: In January 2018, Kirill Shamalov separated from his wife, Katerina Tikhonova, Putin's youngest daughter. He allegedly lost 50% of his wealth as a ‘punishment’ for this separation.)
