= Vladimir Smirnov (businessman) =

Russian businessman

Vladimir Alexeyevich Smirnov (in Russian: Владимир Алексеевич Смирнов, born 1957 in Pskov) is a Russian scientist, and businessman. Between 2002–2007, he was the director general of Tekhsnabexport (TENEX) which carries out export of goods and services produced by Russian nuclear enterprises. During his tenure at Tenex, Smirnov contributed to reducing the threat of nuclear proliferation through the elimination of weapons-grade uranium and its transformation into electricity-producing fuel.

== Education ==
He graduated in 1980 from the Leningrad Institute of Aviation Instrument Production, where he majored in electromechanical engineering. After graduating, Smirnov worked as an engineer and junior researcher at the Leningrad Institute of Aviation Instrument Production.

Later he gained a PhD in Technical Sciences (1986) and in Economics (2000).

The Leningrad Institute of Aviation Instrument Production (today the Saint Petersburg State University of Aerospace Instrumentation) was founded in 1941. It is a well-known center aimed for training of certified specialists in various fields such as advanced aerospace information systems. The first artificial satellite in 1957, Yuri Gagarin's flight in 1961 and the successful launch of Buran spacecraft in 1988 are among the achievements of Soviet astronautics accomplished due to the university's staff, students and graduates. More than 600 students from 39 countries are studying at the university and students and staff regularly participate in exchange programs and internships. US, Canada, Italy, France, Spain, Finland and China are just a few countries the university cooperates with.

Smirnov is also the author of ten inventions and 45 scientific papers. In 1988, he became the youngest senior researcher at the Leningrad Institute of Aviation Instrument Production. In 1988 he was awarded the State Science and Technology Prize for Young Researchers. The prize was donated to the Peace Foundation.

== Early career ==
In 1990, he established one of Saint Petersburg's first joint ventures with German partners, the real estate development company Inform-Future, which built the city's first office centre for foreign companies.

St. Petersburg Immobilien und Beteiligungs AG or SPAG, a Germany real estate company registered in Darmstadt, Germany in 1992. SPAG was active in the construction, sale and rental of commercial and residential properties. In 1997, SPAG was listed on the Frankfurt stock market and became a public traded company. The German Baader Wertpapierhandelsbank AG (today Baader Bank) owned 25% of SPAG.

SPAG developed two main real estate projects in Russia: Inform-Future and Znamenskaya. Inform-Future aimed to establish and run a business centre located Tambovskaya Street in Saint Petersburg. Znamenskaya was to build 700 new apartments to address the housing issues in Saint Petersburg, and in exchange, received a complex of buildings where it developed an international shopping center. Znamenskaya was sold to Finnish public company Stockmann in 2005. The second project, Inform-Future, was sold in 2007 to Finnish real estate company Sponda.

Vladimir Smirnov resigned from all his directorships at SPAG and its subsidiaries, left Saint Petersburg for Moscow in 2001, and ceased to be involved in SPAG.

In 2001, after Smirnov's departure from SPAG, a legal case was opened in Liechtenstein against the company's co-founder Rudolf Ritter, who was arrested in Liechtenstein on suspicions of fraud and money laundering. In 2005, the Supreme Court of Liechtenstein cleared Ritter of all charges.

In 2003, an in-depth investigation for suspicions on money laundering was launched by the prosecution's office in Darmstadt, Germany, leading to the search of the offices and private premises of members of the board and advisory board of SPAG. No evidence was found of these allegations and no charges were brought against any of the parties involved. The investigation ended in 2009 and official documents show that Smirnov has never been a subject of interest in the course of the investigation.

Vladimir Smirnov was one of the members of the Ozero group, which in the fall of 1996 was registered as a co-operative society, and turning it into a gated community.

Smirnov was also the chief executive officer of the Petersburg Fuel Company between 1997 and 1998.

He was a former member of the board of directors of Natsionalny Kosmicheski Bank, one of the top 200 banks out of 1000 operating in Russia. He resigned from his functions in 2012.

== Tenex ==
Techsnabexport (Tenex) is a leading supplier of uranium products, and provides uranium enrichment services for over one third of the world's western type nuclear reactors. Tenex has many subsidiaries across the world, among others in Japan and Korea.

Tenex's story began in 1949 when a special working group of ten people was set up within the All-Union Association Technoexport under the Soviet Union's Foreign Trade Ministry. Its primary goal was to supply equipment to the Soviet Union's uranium mining operations abroad.

In 1989, the company established its first subsidiary Internexco GmbH in Germany and the year after in 1990, Tenex supplied natural uranium to the United States and the European Union. Tenex's cooperation with other governments expanded and in 1995, the export reach expands with the supply of low-enriched uranium to South Africa. In 1999, a contract was concluded with a Group of Western companies (CAMECO of Canada, Areva of France and Nukem from Germany).

Tenex has opened subsidiaries in Japan and Korea as well as in the United Kingdom and Switzerland.

In a period of radical market reforms, between 2002 and 2007, Vladimir Smirnov was General Director of Tekhsnabexport (Tenex). Tenex represents 35-50% of the nuclear world market. During this period, Tenex also signed long-term contracts until 2020 on the system of guaranteed supplies of low-enriched uranium for almost all of the world's nuclear power plants.

In 2003, Smirnov announced a milestone in the effort in reducing the threat of nuclear proliferation through the elimination of weapons-grade uranium and its transformation into electricity-producing fuel. This was presented by Smirnov during a news conference in Washington D.C.

Smirnov supervised the "Megatons to Megawatts Program" between Russia and the United States, allowing Russia to supply the United States with low-enriched uranium obtained from highenriched uranium found to be in excess of Russian defense purposes. This program was considered as one of the most successful disarmament programs in history.

The program enabled Russia to earn USD 3.5 billion since its inception in 1994.

In 2005, Smirnov was appointed as an external advisor to the head of the Federal Atomic Agency, Rosatom. At this time, he presided over the grand opening of the Tenex Subsidiary Office in Tokyo. During the discussion between Tenex and Japanese power companies, the creation of reserve stocks in Japan as well as low-enriched uranium storage facilities were discussed.

Since 2003, JSC Techsnabexport (Tenex), has been the general sponsor of the annual Russian contest of scientific and educational projects "Power of the Future." The contest, organized by the Nuclear Academy, aims to improve the efficiency of education and to upgrade the intellectual potential in the nuclear industry.

In addition, a sponsorship program for nuclear disarmament, non-proliferation, and environment protection activities of Russian and foreign social organizations was established at Tenex between 2002 and 2007, upon the initiative of Vladimir Smirnov. Tenex notably sponsored the Peace Concert which took place in Zug, Switzerland, on 13 October 2002, with the participation of the ensemble led by V. Spivakov. The event was attended by Nobel Peace Prize laureates, ex-President of the USSR Mikhail Gorbachev and Archbishop of Cape Town Desmond Tutu, distinguished European Community leaders and peace movement leaders from various countries.

Smirnov decided to leave Tenex in 2007 and to retire from all official functions.

He has not held any official functions since 2007.
