= Ziyavudin Magomedov =

Russian billionaire businessman

- Born: 25 September 1968 (age 57); Makhachkala, Dagestan ASSR, Russian SFSR, Soviet Union
- Education: Moscow State University
- Occupation: Former russian oligarch
- Website: www.summagroup.ru/en/

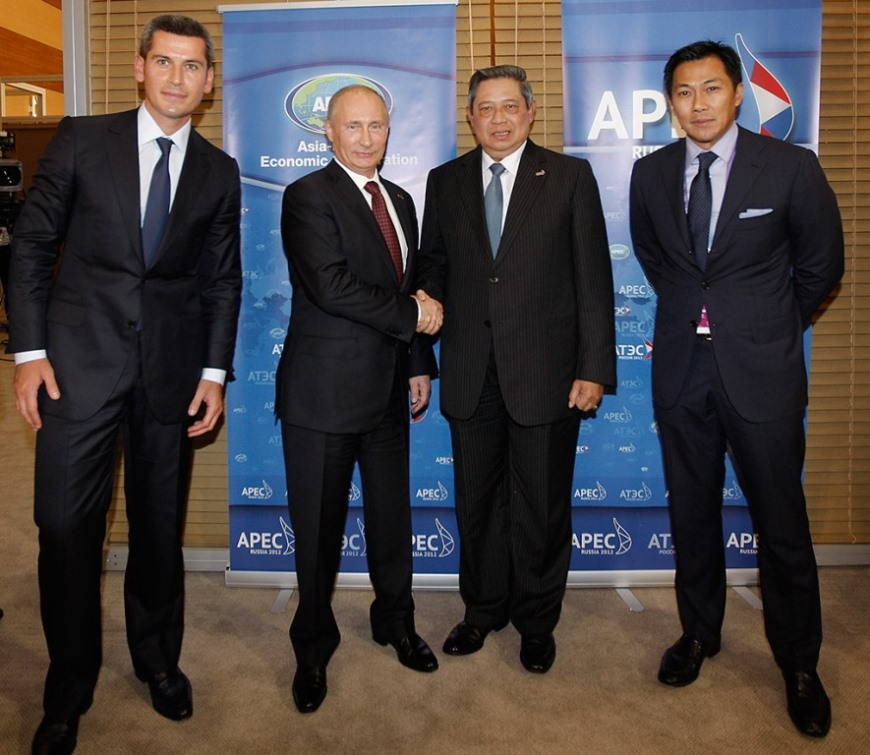
From left to right: Ziyavudin Magomedov, Russian President Vladimir Putin, Indonesian President Susilo Bambang Yudhoyono, and Indonesian businessman Wisnu Wardhana at the APEC CEO Summit 2012.

Ziyavudin Gadzhievich Magomedov (Russian: Зиявудин Гаджиевич Магомедов, born 1968) is a former Russian oligarch whose rapid rise in wealth between 2008 and 2010, followed by his sudden arrest in 2018, has been widely linked to the rise and fall of the so-called "Medvedev clan".

Magomedov amassed a business empire during presidency of Dmitry Medvedev, who stood in for Vladimir Putin from 2008 to 2012. According to Finance magazine, in a single year between 2009 and 2010, Magomedov's fortune grew more than elevenfold – from $70 million to $800 million. Between 2008 and 2018, his Summa Group was described as "one of the least transparent conglomerates in Russia" and primarily operated in sectors requiring government licenses and approvals. According to most media outlets and independent analysts, Ziyavudin relied heavily on his long-standing and close friendship with Arkady Dvorkovich, a key economic advisor to President Medvedev. He was also closely associated with Vladimir Putin's press secretary Dmitry Peskov and Gennady Timchenko, a close friend of Putin since the early 1990s and one of Russia's richest oligarchs.

These connections enabled Magomedov to secure major assets and lucrative government contracts. In 2011, Summa and Transneft took control of Novorossiysk Commercial Sea Port in a deal widely criticized for its lack of transparency. Between 2008 and 2011, his companies received 226 billion roubles (approximately $7.7 billion at the average exchange rate) in government contracts, earning him fourth place on Forbes' "Kings of State Contracts" list in 2012. That same year, he appeared for the first time in Forbes' list of Russia's 200 richest businessmen, ranking 131st. He remained on the list until 2018, with his wealth peaking at $1.4 billion in 2017.

Key Russian opposition activists and political prisoners, including Alexei Navalny and Mikhail Khodorkovsky, have accused Magomedov of paying multimillion-dollar bribes by renting or purchasing super-yachts for high-profile Russian officials, including Dmitry Peskov and Vladimir Putin himself. In 2022, Navalny's Anti-Corruption Foundation included Magomedov in its "6,000 List" of enablers of the Russian invasion of Ukraine labeling him an "individual involved in corruption" and citing his payment for a honeymoon yacht trip for Dmitry Peskov's family.

In March 2018, Ziyavudin Magomedov was arrested in Russia along with his business partner and brother, Magomed Magomedov, a former Russian senator. Kremlin representatives claimed the arrest was 'part of the Russian government's efforts to fight corruption'. Magomedov's lawyers framed it as persecution "under politically motivated circumstances". However, most media outlets and analysts saw the arrest as part of high-level elite infighting – specifically, a crackdown on the so-called "Medvedev clan," which had been losing influence since Medvedev ceded the presidency to Putin in 2012. Magomedov was one of several oligarchs and senior officials associated with Medvedev's circle who were arrested, removed from office, or fled the country between 2013 and 2019. Others included his cousin Akhmed Bilalov, former Deputy Prime Minister Mikhail Abyzov, and former Minister of Defense Anatoly Serdyukov. The late prominent anticorruption activist, Russian opposition leader, and political prisoner Alexei Navalny also refrained from characterising Magomedov's arrest as political persecution, instead describing it as "merely one set of corrupt officials and fraudsters outmaneuvering another group of corrupt officials and fraudsters." Magomedov was sentenced in 2022 to 19 years in prison, later reduced to 18 years and 6 months.

In 2023, Magomedov sued TPG, DP World and Transneft in London for $13.8 billion, alleging a Kremlin-led asset grab. The claim was one of the largest ever filed in the London's High Court. The case was dismissed in 2025. He plans to appeal.

== Early life ==
Ziyavudin Magomedov was born in 1968 in Makhachkala, Dagestan. His ethnicity is Avar.

Magomedov's father was a surgeon, his mother worked as a teacher. Ziyavudin was one of four children in the family. His elder brother and business partner, Magomed Magomedov, also gained fame; from 2002 to 2009, he served as a member of the Federation Council of the Russian Federation representing the Smolensk region.

== Education ==
In 1993 Magomedov earned a bachelor's degree in international economics from Moscow State University.

While studying at the university, Ziyavudin made acquaintances that became decisive in his future career. He became a close friend of Arkady Dvorkovich, who from 2008 to 2012 served as President Medvedev's right-hand man and was responsible for economic regulation. In 2012, Dvorkovich became Deputy Prime Minister of the Russian government, overseeing the industries in which Magomedov's company acquired assets.

According to Novaya Gazeta, a media outlet headed at the time by 2021 Nobel Prize winner Dmitry Muratov, Magomedov and Dvorkovich briefly shared a room on a university campus. Sometimes, Magomedov even beat those who offended Dvorkovich.

"After the election of a new president, Arkady Dvorkovich, with whom Magomedov studied in the same group at the Faculty of Economics of Moscow State University and for some time even shared the same room in the university dormitory, became the Kremlin curator of economic sectors that appealed to the head of the still little-known Summa group of companies. The friendship that began in their youth grew stronger every year until it turned into a full-fledged partnership in the mid-2000s. "They are complete antipodes. Arkady is small, delicate, avoids sharp corners, but is neat and has a sharp analytical mind. And Zia is tall, lean, powerful, decisive, talking to people from a position of strength. These opposites are attracted. They were interested in spending time together, they supported each other in their studies, they had a sense of back. A couple of times Zia even beat Arkady's offenders," recalls an acquaintance of Magomedov."

Novaya Gazeta, The Prime Minister Removed from His Inner Circle: How the downfall of the Summa company and the arrest of its owners, the Magomedovs, will assist Dmitry Medvedev in retaining his position, 2018

Another of Ziyavudin's neighbors in the university dormitory was Ruben Vardanyan (future founder of Troika Dialogue).

Ziyavudin Magomedov earned a PhD in international economics in 2000 from Moscow State University.

== Career ==
=== Early stages ===
While a student during Perestroika in the late 1980s, Magomedov sold imported computers with his brother out of their university dormitory. In the early 1990s he founded the company Interfinance, specialising in investments and financial activities.

=== 2000s ===
Magomedov expanded his business interests in the early 2000s, acquiring land in Primorsk, Leningrad Oblast on which the Primorsk Trade Port was built, with a significant stake owned by Magomedov.

From 2004 to 2005 he was chair of the board of directors of Trans-Oil and the chairman of the board of directors of First Mining Company.

In 2006 Magomedov acquired over 80% of the PJSC Yakutsk Fuel and Energy Company (YATEC), a gas and fuel production company and the main gas producer in the Republic of Sakha (Yakutia).

In 2006 Magomedov's Summa, which had no prior experience in the telecommunications market, unexpectedly obtained a federal license to offer wireless Internet access services using the WiMAX standard. However, the company was unable to build this business and eventually was stripped of frequencies in 2013.

=== 2008–2012: Rapid rise during Medvedev's presidency ===
Magomedov toiled on the margins of Russian business until Dmitry Medvedev became Vladimir Putin's place-holder president. Then in just three years Ziyavudin made most of his fortune through transport and logistics deals, often with the state. Magomedov's business enjoyed wild success during Dmitry Medvedev's presidency. In 2009, the magazine Finance valued his wealth at $70 million. A year later, Magomedov's worth had jumped to $800 million.

"Summa really only became an economic power in the last two years. They are essentially a Medvedev project," says one senior international banker.

Financial Times, "Russia: Eyes on the prize", 2012

Media and analysts associated Magomedov's success with the role of Arkady Dvorkovich, who, as an assistant and then deputy to Medvedev, oversaw the fuel and energy complex, industry, agriculture and transport — the main sectors in which Summa was one way or another present.

Ziyavudin once studied in the same course at the Faculty of Economics of Moscow State University together with Medvedev's longtime ally and assistant Arkady Dvorkovich. The friendship remained for many years. Dvorkovich, being Medvedev's deputy, oversaw the fuel and energy complex, industry, agriculture and transport — the main sectors in which Summa was one way or another present.

Novaya Gazeta, "Summozakluchenie", 2022

The Magomedovs' largest customers were the structures of the Ministry of Transport, which was supervised by Dvorkovich. The amount of such contracts for 2012–2015 exceeded 120 billion rubles (approx. $4 billion by average exchange rate).

Forbes Russia magazine, "Family Affairs. How the Magomedov Brothers Built Their Business and the Consequences of Their Dispute", 2018

Thanks to his connections with Medvedev's right-hand man, Magomedov rapidly ascended in status. In 2010, he became Russia's representative in APEC and by 2012 he held the position of Chairman of ABAC, the APEC Business Advisory Council.

==== Controversial NCSP deal ====
In January 2011 Magomedov together with "Transneft" acquired a majority (50.1%) of the Novorossiysk Commercial Sea Port (NCSP), the largest Russian port operator and the 3rd largest operator in Europe in terms of cargo turnover. In 2012 Mr. Magomedov was made chairman of the board of directors of PJSC NCSP.

The deal was heavily criticized in media and by anticorruption activists. Summa was accused of purchasing NCSP using port's own funds in a highly questionable transaction.

Investors questioned the acquisition, because the deal did not technically cost Summa anything. In a complicated merger deal, the London-traded Novorossiysk port group first borrowed $2.1bn from the state's Sberbank to buy Primorsk port on the Baltic Sea from Summa and Transneft. Summa and Transneft then used the cash to acquire Novorossiysk from its former owners, who included Arkady Rotenberg, President Vladimir Putin's former judo partner. Some investors say Novorossiysk overpaid for Primorsk and tell-tale signs appear in the group's accounts. One is that $1.1bn is set aside in goodwill costs for the Primorsk acquisition, while pre-tax profits generated by Primorsk last year were not enough to repay annual interest on the loan. But the deal, which took the form of a reverse takeover, cost Novorossiysk $2.1bn while technically costing Summa nothing. Meanwhile, the group has not visibly improved value for the port's investors: indeed, the share price has fallen more than 40 per cent.

Financial Times, "Russia: Eyes on the prize", 2012

Prominent anticorruption activist, Russian opposition leader, and political prisoner Alexei Navalny also commented on the sequence of transactions involving the Primorsk Trade Port and NCSP:

The Magomedovs purchased a plot of land, and the remaining resources for the construction of the Primorsk Trade Port were provided by Transneft. However, in this process, the Magomedovs obtained a 50% stake in a joint venture... At that time, Transneft was still under the leadership of Weinstock. One of Weinstock's major schemes was embezzling a considerable amount of money from Transneft alongside the Magomedovs during the establishment of the Primorsk Sea Port. Next comes the Novorossiysk Commercial Sea Port. This company bought the Primorsk Trade Port using a loan obtained from Sberbank. With these funds, the Magomedovs acquired a substantial stake in the Novorossiysk port, becoming the main shareholders. Essentially, they invested nothing in it, as they essentially obtained ownership in the Primorsk port virtually free of charge. They continue to own the Primorsk port, now a subsidiary of the Novorossiysk port, while simultaneously becoming the largest shareholders of the Novorossiysk seaport. They invested nothing, yet, through legal maneuvering, amassed enormous property worth many billions of rubles...

Navalny's YouTube Channel, 'Kemerovo. Switchmen punished, Magomedovs arrested, Moscow mayoral elections', Streamed on Apr 5, 2018. Timecode: 31:48 – 43:50.

==== Medvedev's government's privatisation plan ====
In 2012 Summa came under scrutiny as a beneficiary of favoritism during the new privatisation plan announced by the Dmitry Medvedev-led government. According to Financial Times it "put Summa at the centre of the controversy over the proposed sell-off, meaning the stakes it buys and the amount it pays are becoming a crucial test of Moscow's ability to distance itself from earlier, tainted privatisations and thus bolster the market economy".

The group, lacking any significant experience in international commodity trading, unexpectedly outbid foreign contenders, including the French commodities trader Louis Dreyfus, and secured a stake of 50 percent minus one share in the United Grain Company, the state trader, for $186 million in the new government's first sell-off in May 2012.

In July 2012 Summa bought a stake in the Fesco Transport Group from Sergei Generalov, a former Minister of Fuel and Energy of Russia. The Fesco Transport Group owned the Commercial Port of Vladivostok, the largest universal port in the Russian Far East.

==== King of State Contracts ====
In July 2012 in a commentary to the Financial Times, Mr. Magomedov claimed that Summa's annual revenue had reached $10 billion. A significant portion of this revenue, was derived from state contracts. During that year Summa secured the fourth position in the Forbes ranking titled 'The Kings Of State Contracts', based on official government data analyzing the winners of state tenders.

According to Forbes, in 2011 the company garnered 226 billion rubles (approx. $7.5 billion by the annual average exchange rate) from state contracts in railroad, electricity, and pipeline construction. Summa's major clients were state-owned entities like RZD, Transneft, and FSK Rosseti.

Forbes excluded the company's revenue from the Bolshoi Theatre renovation, which cost 35.4 billion rubles (or $1.13 billion by the annual average exchange rate), as Summa was not the sole subcontractor.

Thus, major part of the company's revenue was connected to sources associated with the Russian state: a country which at the time was ranked 133rd in the Transparency Corruption Perception Index, and where only 3.6% of government procurement was conducted entirely on a competitive basis.

=== 2013–2018: Downfall following the political job swap between Putin and Medvedev ===
In 2012 Putin and Medvedev executed the famous "rokirovka", leading to a job swap between them. Putin returned to the seat of the Russian President, while Medvedev downgraded to the position of prime minister. This political move marked the beginning of the downfall of the so-called 'Medvedev's clan,' consisting of oligarchs and high government officials close to him.

By 2016 Magomedov was no longer in the Forbes 'Kings of State Contracts' ranking. This marked rising tensions between his company Summa and their state clients, who were unsatisfied with the work done by Summa's construction subsidiaries. These tensions were confirmed to the Financial Times by a person close to Arkady Dvorkovich:

Though Mr Magomedov's connections and fortune saw the US name him on its "Kremlin Report" in January, his ties to the US — where he was preparing to fly with his family before his arrest on Saturday — and combative negotiating style earned him several powerful enemies, a person close to Mr Dvorkovich said. "Ziya really wore everyone out. He built roads — they collapsed. He laid pipelines — they leaked."

Financial Times, "Russian billionaire charged with embezzlement", 2018

After Mr Putin replaced Mr Medvedev as president in 2012, state companies challenged the deals that had made Mr Magomedov's fortune. Many of them were in industries regulated by Mr Dvorkovich, who went to Moscow State University with the Magomedov brothers.

Financial Times, "Billionaire's arrest points to Kremlin power struggle", 2018

According to Novaya Gazeta, Ziyavudin Magomedov's situation was exacerbated by his combative negotiation style, particularly with state representatives, which was highly unusual in the Russian business environment. This approach even resulted in a conflict between Ziyavudin and his elder brother Magomed, who believed that being too harsh with state actors could jeopardize their business and lives:

Despite their kinship, the brothers turned out to be completely different in nature. The elder is characterized by calmness and prudence, and at the same time, a difficult character, while the younger by empathy but also a hot temper and unwillingness to compromise with business partners. The elder brother believed that it was dangerous to bargain and argue with the state. The younger one was inclined to dispute, even when business partners had significant administrative support from the state. Ziyavudin turned out to be an atypical representative of modern Russian business, a realm with its implicit concepts, codes, and rules, the violation of which is a direct path either to emigration or to prison. And Ziyavudin's inability to reach agreements with individuals close to the state is perhaps another reason why he and his brother found themselves in pre-trial detention.

Novaya Gazeta, Summozakluchenie, 2022

==== Conflict with Transneft ====
According to Novaya Gazeta, the first conflict between the co-owners of NCSP, namely Summa and the state monopoly Transneft, emerged right after the purchase of the port. Transneft suspected that Magomedov's company was siphoning money from NCSP.

Despite the external harmony of this undoubtedly tactical alliance, the first shareholder conflict between the partners arose almost immediately. The parties had long disputed seats on the management board of NCSP. When Magomedov finally secured the right to operational management of the company, the leadership of Transneft suspected the partner of diverting part of the profits in favor of entities under his control.

According to a source in the FSB, the billionaire shifted the center of profit formation to the so-called "pilotage services," which, under contract, performed stevedoring and bunkering work for the port.

"Whoever controls management controls profitability. The port's management significantly inflated the expenses for service works, effectively engaging in the outflow of a large amount of money," says the source.

Novaya Gazeta, The Prime Minister Removed from His Inner Circle: How the downfall of the Summa company and the arrest of its owners, the Magomedovs, will assist Dmitry Medvedev in retaining his position, 2018

==== Technology investments that could anger Putin ====
In 2015 Magomedov began investing in technology companies. By September 2016, he had invested $300 million in technology stocks such as Uber and Virgin Hyperloop One. He was co-executive chairman of Virgin Hyperloop One prior to his arrest.

According to several sources, Ziyavudin's act of diverting money earned from government contracts to a country that imposed sanctions on the Russian economy and was considered hostile by Putin could potentially anger the Russian President.

An aggravating circumstance could have been that recently the Magomedovs had been involved in financing foreign projects, such as the creation of a vacuum high-speed train based on Elon Musk's idea and the cultivation of artificial diamonds. They were transferring money abroad while benefiting from significant state contracts and failing important projects within the country.

Sobesednik, "From Summa to Prison", 2018

== Net worth ==
Prior to his arrest in 2018, Magomedov's net worth was estimated to be $1.2 billion. At its peak in 2017, it was estimated to be $1.4 billion.

== Corruption allegations ==
=== Putin's superyacht ===
In September 2022 Dossier Center, which "tracks the criminal activity of various people associated with the Kremlin", said a group of Russian business figures led by Gennady Timchenko collected the €583 million needed to construct the 459 ft superyacht Scheherazade. The Dossier Center report didn't fully identify the other oligarchs involved, but it said that one of the offshore companies, High Definition – which donated $60 million – can be linked to Ziyavudin Magomedov.

The funds were collected in 2014, and the yacht was constructed in a German shipyard, launching in July 2019. Multiple sources, including the Anti-corruption Foundation, claimed that it was presented as a Christmas gift to Russian President Vladimir Putin. These allegations were supported by evidence indicating that most of the yacht's crew members were affiliated with the Russian secret service.

Despite this fact Magomedov and his ex-senator brother Magomed Magomedov were arrested. Even after Putin reportedly received the yacht, they remained behind bars, awaiting trial. In 2021, Timchenko, known as one of Vladimir Putin's closest allies, testified in court in support of the detained yacht donors, but this support did not lead to their release.

=== Another superyacht for Putin's press secretary Dmitry Peskov ===
In 2015 anti-corruption activist Alexei Navalny's group, Anti-Corruption Foundation, accused Dmitry Peskov, Vladimir Putin's longtime spokesman, of accepting a bribe to fund the rental of an expensive yacht during his honeymoon in the Mediterranean. According to ACF, Peskov rented the famous 'Maltese Falcon,' a 260-foot yacht that at the time cost 385,000 euros ($426,000) per week. Navalny claimed that the money to pay for this fee came from Ziyavudin Magomedov.

Mr.Magomedov later admitted to the Financial Times that he "liked talking to [Mr Peskov]", but denied paying for the yacht.

== Proximity to Putin's regime (2008–2018) ==
=== Sponsorship of Putin's Personal Projects ===
Companies owned by Ziyavudin Magomedov financed three organizations widely seen as de facto personal projects of Vladimir Putin: the Night Hockey League, the Russian Geographical Society, and the Valdai Discussion Club.

In 2016, Novorossiysk Commercial Sea Port (NCSP) became a sponsor of the Night Hockey League, where Putin regularly "plays for fun with top officials and oligarchs." The Russian president regularly takes to the ice alongside billionaires Arkady and Boris Rotenberg, Gennady Timchenko, and other high-ranking officials, including Prime Minister Mikhail Mishustin. Ziyavudin's brother and business partner, Magomed Magomedov, became president of the league's executive board and joined the team that played alongside President Putin.

Magomed Magomedov also held a position on the board of trustees of the Russian Geographical Society, an organization chaired by Putin and presided over by Defence Minister Sergei Shoigu. The society played a role in shaping Russia's militaristic foreign policy. Magomed reportedly received a personal invitation to join the board from Shoigu.

Ziyavudin Magomedov additionally sponsored the Valdai Discussion Club, a Kremlin-backed international forum originally intended to bolster Putin's image abroad. Behind the scenes, the club was financed by oligarchs and state-linked corporations close to the Kremlin. Other donors included figures such as Sergei Chemezov, Alisher Usmanov, and Viktor Vekselberg.

=== Close Ties with Key Figures in Putin's Inner Circle ===
Ziyavudin and Magomed Magomedov maintained close personal and business relationships with senior government officials and influential figures in Vladimir Putin's inner circle. Their network included Arkady Dvorkovich, Dmitry Peskov, Sergei Shoigu, Gennady Timchenko, Nikolay Tokarev, and Foreign Minister Sergey Lavrov.

- In September 2022 Dossier Center published investigation alleging that in 2014, Gennady Timchenko formed a group of Russian business figures to collect €583 million to build the 459 ft superyacht Scheherazade. One of the contributing offshore companies, High Definition—which donated $60 million—was reportedly linked to Ziyavudin Magomedov. Timchenko later attempted to act as a surety for the Magomedov brothers in court proceedings in 2021.
- From 2011 to 2014, Alexander Vinokurov — the son-in-law of Foreign Minister Sergey Lavrov — served as president of Summa Group. Vinokurov is now the largest shareholder in the retail chain Magnit and was added to the EU Sanctions List in 2022 for providing a substantial source of revenue to the Russian government during the Russo-Ukrainian War.
- In 2012, the Financial Times reported that Magomedov had "forged close ties with Nikolai Tokarev," then head of Transneft and a longtime Putin associate from their KGB days in Dresden.

== Political stance ==
Before his arrest, Ziyavudin Magomedov never spoke out against the Putin regime and never condemned corruption in Russia. His business practices were also heavily criticized by prominent Russian opposition figures.

Vladimir Ashurkov, Executive director of the Anti-Corruption Foundation: «Ziyavudin Magomedov likely employed his business practices through rather unpleasant methods – criminal cases against counterparts, bribing judges, corrupt connections with officials. We have uncovered some of them in our investigations, such as Dmitry Peskov's trip on a yacht rented by the Magomedovs. Undoubtedly, what is happening to the Magomedovs is a selective application of the law. Is it a genuine a fight against corruption when some corrupt individuals are put behind bars because they happened to be weaker than other corrupt individuals? In my opinion, no».

Radio Free Europe/Radio Liberty, "The 'sum' of the Magomedovs' sins: who is imprisoning billionaires?", 2018

=== Legal dispute with Navalny ===
After Navalny accused Mr. Magomedov of bribing Mr. Peskov, Ziyavudin sued the anti-corruption activist and won the trial. In a rather absurd ruling, the court declared the story false on a technicality, stating that Navalny's blog was anonymous. This decision was mocked by Navalny.

"I like talking to [Mr Peskov]," Mr Magomedov admits, but denies paying for the yacht or advocating for Mr Bilalov. Mr Magomedov won a court judgment declaring the story false on a technicality, after claiming that Mr Navalny's blog, which is one of Russia's most popular websites, was anonymous. Under Russia law, a court can rule anonymous comments are untrue without the plaintiff having to provide evidence. "Half the country knows it's mine," Mr Navalny says. "Magomedov's the only one who [pretends] he doesn't."

Financial Times, "Ziyavudin Magomedov, Summa Group: hoping for a Moscow Hyperloop", 2016

== MMA and Khabib Nurmagomedov ==
In 2016 Ziyavudin bought MMA promotion Fight Nights Global and created the commercial company Eagles MMA for sponsoring MMA fighters.

Ziyavudin also provided financial support to Khabib Nurmagomedov during the early stages of his career. After winning the UFC lightweight title, Khabib, in a post-fight interview with Joe Rogan, switched to Russian and publicly asked Putin to release Ziyavudin. However, Putin, who usually favoured Nurmagomedov, ignored this appeal.

== Civic activities ==
Magomedov's Summa Group financed the renovation of the Bolshoi Theatre, a project which had been pending since 2005. In 2007, Magomedov joined the Board of Trustees of the Bolshoi Theatre, with the Theatre reopening in autumn 2011.

Magomedov also founded and financed the PERI Foundation which supports conservation and cultural heritage projects inside and outside of Russia. Projects PERI has worked on include the repair of the oldest mosque in Russia, the protection of ancient gravestones in Dagestan and the digitalisation of ancient Jewish manuscripts, in conjunction with the National Library of Israel.

Mr Magomedov's Foundation has also funded a programme to develop IT and computing skills among young people in Dagestan and donated to dozens of orphanages and schools in the region.

For his charitable activities, Magomedov had been awarded the Order of Friendship (2010), Medal of Honour (2012) and Presidential Certificate of Merit (2012). He was stripped of these awards following his arrest.

== Arrest and imprisonment ==
On 31 March 2018, while preparing to flee to the United States, Magomedov was arrested and charged with "racketeering and embezzlement of state funds" by Russia's Ministry of Internal Affairs.

Magomedov denies the charges, but a Moscow court ruled on 31 March 2018 that he would remain in pre-trial custody, without bail, until 30 May 2018. Magomedov remained in pre-trial custody until December 2022, when he and his brother were sentenced to 19 and 18 years in prison respectively. He was incarcerated in Lefortovo Prison, which the Federal Security Service uses as a maximum-security facility for members of political elite, including oligarchs, former ministers, and former senators charged with contracting murders. The prison also detains high-profile hostages charged with espionage, as well as former journalists and scientists charged with treason. In February 2024, reports suggested that Magomedov had been "transferred to a penal colony in Kirov".

While awaiting trial, the Russian courts froze numerous assets with a total value of several billion dollars, despite alleging $180 million in damages. These assets were subsequently confiscated by the Russian state, including a 32.5% stake in logistics group FESCO and $750 million held in an account at Sberbank.

In March 2023, a ruling by the London Court of International Arbitration was revealed to have found that Magomedov's joint venture partner, Texas Pacific Group, exploited his incarceration and struck a secret deal to sell its interest in FESCO to Kremlin-linked businessman Mikhail Rabinovich.

While in prison in Russia, Magomedov filed a $13.8bn legal claim in London's High Court alleging a Kremlin-led conspiracy to seize his assets. The claim alleges that the Russian stated used his arrest to bring transportation group FESCO under the control of Rosatom, and that Transneft conspired to take his interest in NCSP. He alleges that US private equity firm TPG and Dubai-based ports operator DP World also participated in the conspiracy. The claim is one of the largest ever brought before the English High Court.

Magomedov's imprisonment is believed to be part of an attempt by the Russian state to seize assets under his control, handing them to state entities such as Rosatom or Kremlin-affiliated businessmen such as Mikhail Rabinovich. It has been described as one of the highest-profile prosecutions of a Russian tycoon in years.

== Personal life ==
Magomedov is married, with three children, and lived in Moscow prior to his arrest.
