= Igor Rotenberg =

Russian billionaire

- Игорь Ротенберг
- Born: 9 May 1973 (age 53); Leningrad, Soviet Union
- Occupation: Billionare

Igor Rotenberg (Russian: Игорь Аркадьевич Ротенберг; born 9 May 1973) is a Russian billionaire businessman. In October 2018, Igor Rotenberg's wealth was estimated to be $1.1 billion. As for December 2023, he sold all of his assets in Russian companies.

== Early life and education ==
Igor Rotenberg was born on 9 May 1973 in Leningrad to Arkady Rotenberg. In 2002, he graduated from the Higher School of Privatization and Entrepreneurship (Russian: "Высшей школе приватизации и предпринимательства" (ВШПП)) in Pushkino, Moscow, and received his PhD in Law in 2005 in Kaliningrad at the Kaliningrad Law Institute of the Ministry of Internal Affairs of Russia of the St. Petersburg University of the Ministry of Internal Affairs of Russia.

== Career ==
From 2002 to 2003, he was the Deputy Head of the Department of Property of the Fuel and Energy Complex in the Ministry of Property of Russia which later became Federal Agency for State Property Management in 2004. From 2003 to 2004, he was the Head of the Department of Transport and Telecommunications Property for the Property of Russia. From 2004 to 2005, he was the Vice-President of Russian Railways OJSC and acted as the Head of the Department of Property Management and Organizational Structures. Since 2006, he is the owner and the chairman of the board of directors of the Moscow-based NPV Engineering Group. (Note: In 2015 to reduce Russia's dependence of imports of antimony trioxide, the NPV Engineering Group of Moscow began building a plant for the production of antimony trioxide in Degtyarsk, Sverdlovsk.) Since 2008, he is the Vice-President of the design bureau CB "Northern Sea Route" (Russian: конструкторское бюро ЦБ "Северный морской путь" (Севморпуть)). Since 2010, he is the chairman of the board of directors of Mosenergo Heat and Power Company. Since 2011, he is the chairman of the board of directors of Gazprom Burenie LLC (Burgaz).

In 2015, Arkady Rotenberg sold his son Igor Rotenberg a number of assets including up to 79% of Gazprom Drilling (Bureniye), 28% of the road construction company Mostotrest, (Note: While he was the Minister of Transport of the Russian Federation from 20 May 2004 to 2012, Igor Levitin ensured in 2010 that Arkady Rotenberg's firms would construct the toll roads on Russian federal highways.) and 33.3% of Jersey-based TPS Real Estate Holdings Ltd. Alexander Ponomarenko and Aleksandr Skorobogatko own 66.6% of TPC Real Estates Holdings.

It was reported that Arkady Rotenberg made this move after being placed on the U.S. sanctions list.

In 2015, OJCS TPS Real Estate (Russian: ОАО "ТПС недвижимость") is one of the largest commercial real estate developers in Russia that manages several shopping centers in Russia and Ukraine. It is 100% owned by TPS Real Estate Holding Ltd. It owns the Krasnodar Gallery (Russian: ТРЦ "Галерея Краснодар"), Sochi's Moremoll (Russian: ТРЦ "Моремолл"), and Kiev's Ocean Plaza (Russian: ТРЦ "Ocean Plaza"). It is building the Novosibirsk Gallery (Russian: ТРЦ "Галерея Новосибирск") and Moscow's Slavyansky Boulevard metro station and Polezhayevskaya metro station. At the end of 2016, TPS Real Estate managed 12 shopping center with a total area of over 2 million square meters.

In 2016, Igor Rotenberg was at the center of a controversy surrounding Platon (Russian: ПЛАТОН), a company he half-owns, and alleged discrepancies in its contracts with the federal road agency, Rosavtodor. Operated by RT Invest, the Platon toll system electronically tracks and charges tolls to trucks over 12 tons on Russian Federal roads. With a 25% ownership by Rotenberg and using satellite tracking data, ScanEx (Russian: ООО "ГК Сканэкс"), a subsidiary of RT Invest, is developing an electronic map of the 50,000 km (31,000 mi) of Russian federal roads in order to track vehicles for payment to Platon. (Note: Competitors of ScanEx are Sovzond (Russian: "Совзонд"), Data East (Russian: "Дата Ист"), and others.) Approved on 29 September 2014 by Roman Starovoyt (Russian: Роман Старовойт), who is the head of Rosavtodor, and Alexander Sovetnikov (Russian: Александр Советников), who is the director of RT – Invest Transport Systems (RTITS) (Russian: "РТ-Инвест Транспортные системы"), Rotenberg, through his companies, (Note: Igor Rotenberg owns RTITS and co-owns RT-Invest with Andrey Shipelov's (Russian: Андрей Шипелов) Tsaritsyn Capital (Russian: ООО "Царицын Капитал") and Rostec (Russian: "Ростех").) is guaranteed to receive from the state budget a very large portion of the 10.6 billion rubles indexed to inflation each year without VAT (4.98 billion rubles paid semi-annually) from 15 November 2015, to 29 September 2027, which is paid to the Planton & RT Invest partnership. After this was revealed, a large strike across Russia by truck drivers occurred on Russian federal highways beginning November 2015. On 28 November 2015, Anton Nosik alleged that the state would be missing large sums of money from the Avtodor GC (Russian: ГК «Автодор») tolls between the 15th km (Businovskaya intersection on the Moscow Ring Road) to the 58th km (Solnechnogorsk) along M11, which had been applied as maintenance fees not only to truck drivers but to all drivers and were not to be paid until the M11 project was completed, but were being charged to all motorists beginning on 23 November 2015. He alleged that the missing money from the budgeted funds for the construction of the M11 as well as both the future moneys from Avtodor GC and the PLATON systems had been diverted to the Rotenburgs' pockets through real estate money laundering investments in Miami. Instead of the expected total revenues from Platon of 20 to 40 billion rubles, the actual revenues were 25% or less than those figures.

On 29 March 2018, Igor sold his 33.3% stake in TPS Real Estate Holdings for $1 billion to his sister Liliya Rotenberg (Russian: Лилия Аркадьевичнa Ротенберг; born 17 April 1978).

In 2021, Igor Rotenberg resigned as chairman of the board of directors of Gazprom Drilling and sold his stake in the company.

== Sanctions ==
On 6 April 2018, Igor Rotenberg and his NPV Engineering Group were placed under United States sanctions.

On 22 February 2022, Igor Rotenberg was placed under sanctions by the UK government as part of the 2021-2022 Russo-Ukrainian crisis.

On 8 April 2022, Igor Rotenberg was placed under sanctions by European Union.

On 19 October 2022, Igor Rotenberg was placed under sanctions by Ukraine.

== Wealth ==
In October 2018, Igor Rotenberg had an estimated wealth of $1.1 billion by Forbes.

== Personal life ==
Igor is married, and has three children. He is the oldest son of Arkady Rotenberg, Russian billionaire businessman and co-owner with brother Boris Rotenberg, of the SGM (Stroygazmontazh) group. The Rotenberg brothers are closely associated with Vladimir Putin. His sister is Liliya Rotenberg, and his brother is Pavel Rotenberg.

Igor was married to his first wife Alina in 2003. They divorced in 2009.
