= TPS Group =

TPS Group Holding
- Company type: Holding company
- Industry: Real estate management
- Founded: 2005 (discretionary trust formed)
- Founder: Alexander Ponomarenko; Aleksandr Skorobogatko
- Headquarters: Moscow, Russia
- Area served: Russia; Ukraine
- Services: Building, managing international airports and shopping malls

TPS Group Holding ("TPS Group") is a holding company fully owned by a discretionary trust formed in 2005 by Russian entrepreneurs Alexander Ponomarenko and Aleksandr Skorobogatko. TPS Group Holding holds two companies: TPS Avia and TPS Real Estate. TPS Avia specializes in building and managing major international airports, like Sheremetyevo International Airport in Moscow. TPS Real Estate specializes in building and managing major shopping malls.

== Operations ==
Based in Moscow, TPS Group Holding holds two companies: TPS Avia and TPS Real Estate.

=== TPS Avia ===
TPS Avia was founded in 2012, with 65,22% of TPS Avia's share capital belonging to TPS Group Holding.

In 2013, TPS Avia won a competitive tender to develop Sheremetyevo International Airport’s northern area by calling for constructing a new terminal B, two underground tunnels connecting the airport's northern and southern areas, new cargo handling technology, and improved aircraft fueling facilities.

TPS Avia self-funded nearly US$800 million of the project as Sheremetyevo International Airport became the largest airport in Russia, serving more than 49 million passengers in 2019.

Sheremetyevo International Airport now employs more than 12,000 people and serves leading Russian and international airlines, including Aeroflot, Air France KLM, Delta, Alitalia, China Airlines, flydubai and Atlas Global. Sheremetyevo International Airport generated around US$937 million in revenues in 2018.

=== TPS Real Estate ===
OJSC TPS Real Estate (ТПС Недвижимость) ("TPS RE") is a Russian real estate management company based in Moscow.

TPS RE manages two shopping centers in Moscow located in Kutuzovsky Prospekt and Khoroshevskoye Shosse with a total area of more than 250,000 square meters.

In October 2016, Aleksandr Ponomarenko stated that TPS Group intended to double its shopping centers in Moscow from two to four, with the planned shopping centers having a combined area of 300,000 square meters.

TPS Real Estate has more than 700,000 square meters of real estate under management in Moscow, Krasnodar, Sochi and Novosibirsk. It was founded in 2004 by the trust acting in the interests of family members of both Alexander Ponomarenko and Alexander Scorobogatko with the trust holding 66.6% of the shares and Rotenberg the remaining 33.3%. Rotenberg sold his interest in TPS Real Estate to his son Igor in 2014. In 2015, TPS RE saw a revenue of 11.1 billion rubles ($181,818,000 USD).

In June 2018, TPS Real Estate was in negotiations to sell its Ocean Plaza shopping center in Kyiv, Ukraine to Dragon Capital Group. The shopping center is estimated to be valued between $270–$315 million, which is approximately the same as when it was built.

== Sheremetyevo International Airport ==
TPS Avia has been the controlling shareholder of Sheremetyevo International Airport since 2016 when TPS Group announced an expansion of the Sheremetyevo International Airport to accommodate the 2018 World Cup.

Energo-System will be responsible for the construction project. TPS Group acquired 50% in Energo-Sistema for the duration of their construction project on Terminal B of Sheremetyevo International Airport. The project will cost $630 million.

Alexander Ponomarenko announced in 2018 that TPS Real Estate may sell a 10% stake in the airport to help finance the construction projects. In April 2018, the Russian transport minister was informed the new terminals would not be completed in time for the World Cup’s June 14 kickoff.

In the first half of 2018, Sheremetyevo International Airport reported a 13% increase in passengers to 20.5 million. There was also a 14.3% increase in aircraft traffic year over year. In the first half of 2018, the airport reported €194.9 million, a 6% increase year over year. Profit increased 7.4% year over year. These increases are attributed in part to increased air traffic due to the 2018 FIFA World Cup.
