= Boris Rotenberg =

Boris Rotenberg is the name of:

- Boris Rotenberg (businessman) (born 1957), Russian businessman
- Boris Rotenberg (footballer) (born 1986), Finnish-Russian footballer, son of Boris Romanovich Rotenberg
