= Roman Rotenberg =

Finnish-Russian entrepreneur (born 1981)

- Роман Ротенберг
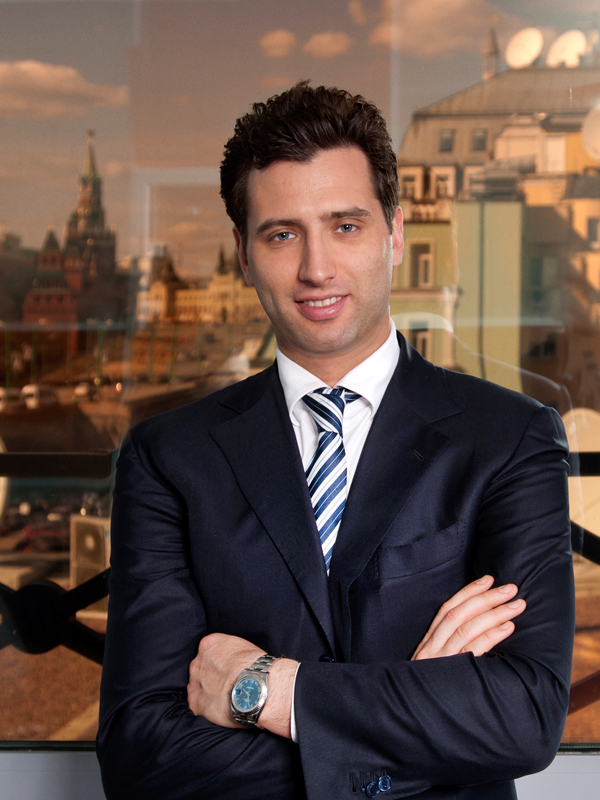
- Born: Roman Borisovitch Rotenberg; 7 April 1981 (age 45); Leningrad, Russian SFSR, Soviet Union
- Citizenship: Finland; Russia; United Kingdom
- Occupations: Entrepreneur, manager
- Father: Boris Rotenberg
- Relatives: Boris Rotenberg (brother); Arkady Rotenberg (uncle)

Roman Borisovich Rotenberg (Russian: Роман Борисович Ротенберг; born 7 April 1981) is a Finnish and Russian entrepreneur, manager and ice hockey executive. He is first vice-president of the Russian Ice Hockey Federation, general manager of the Russia national ice hockey team, Gazprombank vice-president (responsible for clients' attraction), member of the Kontinental Hockey League board of directors, Deputy Chairman of the KHL board, Deputy Chairman of the SKA Hockey Club board of directors, SKA CEO and vice-president, founder of Vitawin company (production and distribution of sports nutrition). Founder of a number of other companies in the sports marketing, media and sports equipment markets. He is also active in these following fields: owner of the Hartwall Arena stadium, chairman of the Arena Events board of directors and is Gazprom Export's consultant on external communications.

== Biography ==
Roman Rotenberg was born in Leningrad, Russian SFSR, Soviet Union, in 1981. Irina Haranen, his mother, had a good job in the city's commercial management. His father Boris Rotenberg (of Russian-Jewish origin) is a Master of Sport and a judo coach, had taught self-defence at the military academy. His grandfather was of Ashkenazi Jewish descent, and worked as a director at the Leningrad factory plant for "Krasnaya Zarya" telephone handsets. His maternal grandfather, Mikko Haranen, was a Ingrian (Finns who moved to the St Petersburg region in the 17th century). Mikko was born in the small village of Toksovo in Leningrad Region, where Boris and Irina once met. In 1991, Roman's and his younger brother Boris's parents decided to emigrate from St Petersburg to Helsinki as Ingrian returnees. There, Roman, who had previously studied the English and Finnish language at school no. 204 next to the Hermitage, went into the third class of a normal school and received Finnish citizenship. In Finland, Roman continued to compete in judo: since being five years old, his father had coached him and taken him to training camps. After turning 11, Roman started to train with a local ice hockey team. Upon leaving school, he went to a sports college and planned to become a professional hockey player.

In 1999, his father separated from his wife and returned to Saint Petersburg. By Roman's own admission, beginning a sporting career would have been too risky. Despite his father's objection, Roman travelled to study in London. This was because his mother, who then owned a small business for the supply of gas condensate from Russia, demanded him to go there. After a year of preparation courses, Roman joined the European Business School London, where he studied international business. He earned a master's degree in business management. Following his graduation, his father suggested that Roman stayed in London to work in a Barclays bank, while his mother wanted him to go back to Finland. In 2014, it became known that Roman has British citizenship.

In January 2024, Russian news agency TASS reported that Rotenberg was included on the list of supporters of Vladimir Putin in the 2024 presidential election. By law, self-nominated candidates such as Putin are allowed to have proxies who campaign on their behalf.

== Career ==
Upon his return to Russia in 2005, Roman decided not to join his father's and uncle Arkady's business, who were already well known entrepreneurs and SMP Bank owners. Instead, with his father's advice, he began his business career with Gazprom Export, a company with which Roman could use his international communications and language skills. He met Alexander Medvedev, Gazprom Export's CEO and also an enthusiastic hockey player. At the 2009 Saint Petersburg International Economic Forum, Roman spoke with Gazprombank representatives, the company with which Roman had work experience when studying in London. To work with their bank, Roman had to go through a three-year procedure to retrieve his Russian citizenship and to receive a Russian financial degree (he defended his thesis covering the "Strategy of using market instruments in the physical culture and sports area" and earned a Ph.D. in economics). At this moment in time, Roman is the company's vice president and is responsible for attracting big-name clients. In January 2022, Rotenberg was appointed as the head coach of SKA St. Petersburg. According to Moscow Times and other Russian news dailies, such an appointment brought "criticism from sports commentators for his lack of coaching experience". Nevertheless, in July 2023, Rotenberg extended his coaching contract for another five years.

== Ice hockey manager ==
In 2007, Medvedev developed the Kontinental Hockey League (KHL) plan. To manage all league commercial contracts, the KHL marketing company was created. Roman was named the deputy general director. On 20 January 2015, Roman joined the KHL's board of directors. In 2011, SKA Hockey Club president Gennady Timchenko offered the position of club vice-president to Roman. On 11 December 2014, Roman became the Russian Ice Hockey Federation's first vice-president. He manages the cooperation between the RIHF and KHL, marketing strategies, and searches for new partners. He is also the head of the Russian national team staff, including the analytical and statistical departments. Since 2016, he has been a member of the IIHF's reforming system. In December 2016, he was granted official thanks from the Russian President Vladimir Putin for his contribution to sport and Russian ice hockey.

In 2023, Rotenberg thanked Russian state-owned Gazprom for their contribution to Russia's victory at the 2018 Winter Olympics.

Separately, it should be noted the contribution of Gazprom and Alexei Borisovich Miller to our victory at the Olympics in 2018. We were able to bring back many players from the NHL and create a strong team. All this was done at the expense of the Gazprom budget. The national team had a coaching staff, staff, managers - all from SKA. 15 SKA players in the national team is a world record. Never before has there been 15 players from one club in a team that has won Olympic gold. Without Gazprom's investments, that victory would have been impossible. We have to thank the company for this. We will always do our best to respond with victories to such trust.

Rotenberg also compared Russia's ice hockey victory over Germany in 2018 to Russia's victory in World War II in 1945.

== Honours ==
As RIHF first vice-president and general manager of the Russian national ice hockey teams:

2015 World Championship silver medalist

2016 World Junior Championship silver medalist

2016 World Championship bronze medalist

Russia reached the semi-finals of the 2016 World Cup of Hockey in Toronto. This was the first time since 2002 that Russia had made the final four of a best-on-best competition.

2017 World Junior Championship bronze medalist

2017 World Championship bronze medalist

2018 Winter Olympic Games gold medalist

2019 World Junior Championship bronze medalist

2019 World Championship bronze medalist

2020 World Junior Championship silver medalist

2022 Winter Olympic Games silver medalist

Under Roman Rotenberg's leadership, the Red Machine brand was revamped and the Russian Ice Hockey Federation was comprehensively rebranded. Russian national teams were given a modern video analysis system, which is aimed at increasing the quality of players' training.

As HC SKA's vice-president:

Two-time Gagarin Cup winner (2015, 2017)

Russian champion (2017)

Continental Cup winner (2013, 2018)

Holder of the Valentin Sych prize for the KHL's best club leader (2015, 2017)

Founder of the Sportconcept holding, which includes the Doctor Sport company (Vitawin brand, sports nutrition) and Rossport (manufacturer of sports equipment). 450 people are employed by Sportconcept, and the holding's annual revenue is two billion rubles. Subsequently, the company was acquired by a group of investors.

Awarded the Order of Friendship "For the successful training of Russian athletes who have achieved high sporting achievements at the XXIII Olympic Winter Games 2018 in Pyeongchang (South Korea)".

== Business in Russia ==
In autumn 2010, the Doctor Sport company was founded which is a sports nutrition distributor. SMP Bank gave Doctor Sport a 20 million budget for three years. The company stated that it aims to give athletes a high quality and anti-doping diet. The idea to create a Russian sports nutrition company belongs to Alexander Medvedev. In 2010, he asked Roman Rotenberg to speak to the KHL about the issue of using Russian sports nutrition in the KHL. The GNC American company, one of the biggest sports nutrition, vitamin, energy and protein distributors, was used as a sample business model. A year after its launch, Rotenberg stated that Doctor Sport had already broken even in operating terms. In July 2015, Doctor Sport already had 50 outlets, making it one of Russia's biggest companies on the sports nutrition market. Against the background of a shift in demand for sports nutrition online, Doctor Sport's revenue began to decline, and in September 2018 SMP-Bank sold the company.

In December 2014, Roman Rotenberg wanted to purchase 80% of the Telesport marketing agency owned by Petr Makarenko. The parties didn’t publish the exact transaction figure, but it was estimated to be around several billion roubles. Telesport is the biggest player on the sports marketing market, it manages sports facilities and holds the right to show sporting competitions in Russia. In 2015, it became known that the transaction wasn’t fully completed. The reason was that there are serious differences between Telesport and the Russian Football Union. In 2016, a group of investors, which included Roman Rotenberg, decided not to buy Telesport. In July 2015, it was announced that Rotenberg had the aim of purchasing the Rossport sewing and print manufacturing company. Rossport is the main supplier for Russian sports clubs, including IHC SKA. It was reported that the deal would include the company's Kostroma and Dedovsk factories. According to experts’ estimates, the share would be around 60 million roubles, with the overall business evaluated in the range of 75-80 million roubles.

Founder of the Sportconcept holding, which unites companies in the field of sports marketing, distribution of sporting products, the management and design of sporting complexes and facilities, supply of equipment for sporting arenas.

The holding companies have many years of experience in managing, operating and equipping ice hockey arenas and multi functional sports complexes, developing their own Russian production and sewing equipment and merchandise for famous brands. The companies engage in the retail and wholesale sale of sports production. Subsequently, the company was acquired by a group of investors.

== Business in Finland ==
In summer 2013, Rotenberg's family and Gennady Timchenko bought the company Arena Events Oy, which owns the Hartwall Arena in Helsinki. The arena has a capacity of 13,000 guests. In the autumn of that year, they purchased 49% of Jokerit Helsinki ice hockey club, which was joining the KHL in the 2014/2015 season. In October 2014, Roman Rotenberg bought out the parts which his father and uncle owned in the deal. They were both on the USA's sanctions list. The Langvik Capital company, which is made up of the Långvik hotel and business hall in Kirkkonummi, not far away from Helsinki, acted as the intermediary. Roman Rotenberg also owns the Langvik Capital company. Arena Events Oy shares are divided out as follows: Langvik Capital – 49.5%, Roman Rotenberg 1%, White Anchor (Gennady Timchenko) – 49.5%.

=== Sanctions ===
On July 30, 2015, Roman Rotenberg and the Oy Langvik Capital company were included in the United States financial ministry's sanctions list along with eleven other individuals and entities. In March 2022, Rotenberg was added to the United Kingdom's sanctions list in relation to Russia's actions in Ukraine.

== Family ==
Father – Boris Romanovich Rotenberg (born in 1957), businessman, Russian Judo Federation vice-president, co-owner of SMP Bank.
Brother – Boris Borisovich Rotenberg (born 1986), football, FC Lokomotiv Moscow defender
Uncle – Arkady Romanovich Rotenberg (born 1951), billionaire, Russian Judo first vice-president, co-owner of SMP Bank.
Cousin – Igor Arkadevich Rotenberg (born 1973), businessman, top-manager
Wife – Galina Keda, model. Two children: daughter Arina and son Roman.
