= Eagles MMA =

Russian MMA organization

- Est.: November 2016; 9 years ago
- Founded by: Khabib Nurmagomedov; Ziyavudin Magomedov
- Primary trainers: Abdulmanap Nurmagomedov (former head coach)
- Training facilities: Russia
- Website: eagles-mma.com

Eagles MMA is a Russian mixed martial arts (MMA) organization that provides training and management services to fighters. It was founded by former UFC Lightweight Champion, Khabib Nurmagomedov and Russian businessman, Ziyavudin Magomedov.

== History ==
In November 2016, Eagles MMA was founded by MMA fighter, Khabib Nurmagomedov and billionaire businessman, Ziyavudin Magomedov who was owner of the Summa Group. Magomedov had taken an interest in martial arts where previously he invested in Russian MMA promotion, Fight Nights Global, attempted to buy the UFC for $4 billion USD as well as funded Nurmagomedov by paying for his back surgery to be performed in Germany in 2017 as well as covering the majority of his expenses during training camps. Magomedov was hoping to build an MMA brand that would expand globally. Nurmagomedov took the role of president and would be the one managing the organization. His father, Abdulmanap became the head coach.

At the end of 2017, Nurmagomedov stated in an interview with Forbes that excluding his fight fees, 50% of his income came from Eagles MMA while the other 50% came from Reebok sponsorship.

In March 2018, Magomedov was arrested while preparing to travel to the United States. He was charged with racketeering, embezzlement, and establishing an organized crime group. He had been suspected for years of embezzling money from various projects which include the construction of a stadium in Kaliningrad for the 2018 FIFA World Cup. An investigator stated fighters from Eagles MMA acted as security for Magomedov which made it difficult to carry out investigations but Magomedov denied this stating the organization had nothing to do with his security. A few weeks later after the arrest, at UFC 223 after winning the UFC Lightweight Championship, Nurmagomedov in his post-fight interview pleaded to Russian president Vladimir Putin to help Magomedov. In December 2022, Magomedov was found guilty and sentenced to 19 years in prison.

In December 2018, Eagles MMA executive, Denis Klopnev was arrested in absentia for the attempted murder of fighter Shamil Kuramagomedov and was placed on the international wanted list. In addition, several other Eagles MMA staff as well as fighters were also arrested in absentia for being suspected of being involved in the alleged attack. A group of fighters affiliated with Eagles MMA and Summa Group allegedly attacked Kuramagomedov where he was hospitalized with a concussion, a traumatic brain injury, and a broken nose. However, Kuramagomedov did not report the assault to the police. The reason for the attack was stated to be due to Kuramagomedov showing interest in usurping leadership from Klopnev.

In July 2020, head coach Abdulmanap Nurmagomedov died from COVID-19 complications.

In June 2024, Eagles MMA was a subject of investigation by the Federal Security Service after one of the perpetrators of the 2024 Dagestan attack, Gadzhimurad Kagirov was said to be linked to Eagles MMA. Nurmagomedov released a statement condemning the attack and stated that while Kagirov did have a camp with the gym, he was not part of the team.

== Notable fighters ==
- Khabib Nurmagomedov
- Islam Makhachev
- Usman Nurmagomedov
- Umar Nurmagomedov
- Abubakar Nurmagomedov
- Vitaly Minakov
- Sergei Pavlovich
- Tagir Ulanbekov
- Sultan Aliev
- Omari Akhmedov
- Saparbek Safarov
- Rasul Mirzaev
- Khasan Magomedsharipov
- Marat Gafurov

== See also ==
- Eagle Fighting Championship
