= Philip Moor =

British judge

The Honourable Mr Justice Moor
- Royal coat of arms of the United Kingdom

Justice of the High Court
- Incumbent
- Assumed office 2011

Personal details
- Born: 15 July 1959 (age 67)
- Education: Pembroke College, Oxford

Sir Philip Drury Moor (born 15 July 1959), styled The Hon. Mr Justice Moor, is a judge of the High Court of England and Wales.

== Biography ==
Born on 15 July 1959, Moor studied jurisprudence (law) at Pembroke College, Oxford from 1978 - 1981. He was called to the bar by the Inner Temple in 1982.

Moor was appointed Queen's Counsel in 2001 and made a judge of the High Court of Justice of England and Wales in 2011. He was assigned to the Family Division and knighted the same year.

In 2004, he was appointed Chairman of the Family Law Bar Association. He was made a Bencher of the Inner Temple in 2004 and has since been chair of its Scholarship Committee. As a High Court Judge, he has been Chair of the High Court Judge's Association and served as Family Division Liaison Judge, first for Wales and then for the South East of England.

== Career ==
As a judge, he participated in a number of high-profile trials, including:

- The divorce of British entrepreneur Scot Young from his wife Michelle Young. This litigation extended from the paperwork filed in 2006 into 2014 at the passing of Scot Young. Michelle Young was awarded £26 million by Judge Moore's decision. These divorce proceedings were documented as the longest in British history.
- The divorce of Russian businessman Arkady Rotenberg from his second wife, Natalia. In Moor’s decision, he ordered Arkady Rotenberg to transfer the ownership of Ribsden Manor to his ex-wife Natalia; a property located near the village of Bagshot in the Surrey Heath borough of Surrey, England, worth $36.2 million. Moor’s decision was appealed by Arkady Rotenberg to the Court of Appeals for England and Wales. According to Rotenberg's lawyers, the manor never belonged to Rotenberg. Subsequently, the hearings in the case, chaired by Judge Moor, resumed. In regards to the secrecy and declassification, the names of the parties in the Rothenberg divorce proceedings became widely known. In September 2016, the British newspaper Times filed a lawsuit in the High Court of Justice in London demanding to name the names of a major foreign businessman and his ex-wife, individuals that were involved in lengthy legal proceedings or financial matters related to this case. On 25 July 2017 the court decided to disclose the details of the financial agreements between Arkady and Natalia Rotenberg. In response to this, Rotenberg appealed to the Supreme Court of the United Kingdom with a request that would allow him to keep the details of the agreement secret. In February 2018, the Supreme Court ruled to declassify the divorce proceedings between both parties.
- In 2020, Moor decided to award £400,000 to a woman for “sacrificing her career as a solicitor for the sake of her marriage”. Moor’s decision factored in that the woman could become a successful partner in a law firm.

As a judge, Moor, filed a pension-related lawsuit against the Lord High Chancellor of Great Britain, having been excluded from pension payments after the reform of the system in 2015.
