= Alexander Vinokourov (disambiguation) =

Alexander Vinokourov or Alexander Vinokurov may refer to the following people:

- Alexander Vinokourov (born 1973), Kazakh bicycle racer
- Alexander Vinokurov (politician) (1869–1944), Soviet politician
- Alexander Vinokurov (businessman) (born 1982), Russian businessman
