= Summa Group =

Group of Russian companies

- Native name: Группа «Сумма»
- Industry: port logistics; engineering; construction; telecommunications
- Founded: Moscow, Russia (April 15, 1993)
- Defunct: November 21, 2007
- Fate: Bankrupted
- Headquarters: Moscow, Russia
- Key people: Ziyavudin Magomedov founder and owner; Alexander Khonkhin general director
- Website: www.summagroup.ru

Summa Group was a Russian independent group of companies holding port logistics, engineering, construction, the telecommunications and oil and gas sectors assets. Summa's headquarter located in Moscow. Companies of the group, which are present in almost 40 regions of Russia and abroad, employed more than 10 thousand people.

The parent company is Summa Group LLC. Until August 2011, it was called “Summa Capital”.

== Owners and management ==
Summa group is controlled by the entrepreneur Ziyavudin Magomedov. He also being a direction board member. Current general director of holding - Alexander Khonkhin.

== Activities ==
Among the assets controlled by Sumy: NCSP Group (25%, the Novorossiysk Commercial Sea Port is a part of the group), FESCO Transport Group (32.5%), Yakutsk Fuel and Energy Company (over 90%), SUIproekt, telecommunication National Telecom, operator of the terminal in the port of Rotterdam Shtandart TT BV (100%), engineering and construction companies Stroynovatsiya and Transengineering. Summa also owns a large package in the Novorossiysk bakery products.

=== UGC privatization ===
From 2011 and until February 13, 2019, Summa owned a 50% package minus one share of the United Grain Company received as a result of the 2012 privatization, carried out by Summa Group president Alexander Vinokurov, who held this post in 2011–2013. Currently, this block of shares has become the property of VTB Bank.

=== Capital and performance indicators ===
Group performance indicators are not disclosed. Ziyavudin Magomedov took 63rd place in 2017 in the rating of the Russian Forbes with a fortune of $1.4 billion

== Criminal case ==
On March 31, 2018, Ziyavudin Magomedov, the head of company, was detained for two months by a decision of the Tverskoy court of the city of Moscow, until May 30, on suspicion of theft of 2.5 billion rubles at the head of a criminal organization. The court ruling noted that the term of punishment for a particularly serious crime incriminated to Magomedov exceeds 10 years in prison, and the case file contains testimony of witnesses who reported pressure on them

The criminal case was the first in the history of the Russian Federation, when the investigation considered the business group as a criminal community, some media compared it in scale with the Yukos case.

== Current status ==
Despite the owner's arrest, Summa Group continued its work, gradually losing some assets and optimizing the work of others. Leyla Mammadzade, who was one of the key figures in the company and managed the assets of Summa Group through the board of directors, announced in January 2020 that she would leave the company this year.
