= Rotenberg Law =

The Rotenberg Law (Russian: Закон Ротенберга) - the draft of Federal law of Russian Federation #607554-6 On amendments to the Federal law "On compensation for violation of the right to trial within a reasonable time or the right to execution of a judicial act within a reasonable time" (clarification of certain provisions of the Federal law in regard to obtaining compensation for the violation of the right to execution of a judicial act within a reasonable time). The law is informally named after a Russian businessman Arkady Rotenberg, after Italy had frozen nearly $40 million in assets held.

The bill proposed seizing the Russia-based assets of foreign countries that have sanctioned Russian citizens.

It was declined in 2017.
