= Natalia Rotenberg =

Russian businesswoman and politician

Personal details
- Born: 18 January 1981 (age 45) Kurgan, Kurgan Oblast, Russian SFSR, Soviet Union
- Party: Strength of the Fatherland
- Spouse(s): Arkady Rotenberg; Tigran Arzakantsyan
- Children: 2

Natalia Sergeevna Rotenberg (born 18 January 1981) is a Russian businesswoman and politician.

== Early years ==
Natalia Rotenberg was born Natalia Nikolaeva on 18 January 1981 into a large family in Kurgan. In her early years she did rhythmic gymnastics and graduated from Gromov School of Music Arts.

Later she graduated from School of Art as a choreographer and worked as a choreography and ballet teacher for children aged 6-11. Natalia graduated from the State University of Management with a degree in Financial Risks Management. In 2020 she graduated from the Russian Presidential Academy of National Economy and Public Administration with a degree in State and Municipal Enterprise Management..

== Charity, political and social activities ==
In 2015, Natalia founded the charity fund NR. She participates as a speaker in various forums and conferences across Russia and uses her charity fund to support children in art, sport and culture..

In 2016, she supported a young pianist Milena Putilova by arranging classes with teachers and participation in musical festivals. She became a guardian for Lidia Evdokimova, an orphan from Mogilev, Belarus. Natalia supported the international tour of The Shadow Show, and international competitions in rhythmic gymnastics in London.

In 2017, "The Bolshoi" – a book in English by Rotenberg aimed to tell Europe about the Russian ballet - was presented in London. She sponsored the annual competition and junior boxing championship in Tyumen and Kirov, which hosted 150 young athletes from Russia and 5 from CIS. In Kirov, she helped send 150 children to a summer camp. Natalia helped the Sports Academy arrange the rhythmic gymnastics competition London Cup UK 2017. She provided assistance in the international competition of young entrepreneurs Synergy Global Forum 2017 arranged by Synergy University and supported a junior football team Dinamo in Kirov.

In 2018-2020, Rotenberg supported the girl boxing championship in Kirov and a junior team from Kirov in a popular TV show KVN. The children got a chance to go to Moscow and take part in semifinals of the TV show. Natalia assisted The Ministry of Social Development of the Kirov region in arranging the Family Day event. She gifted an oboe, a rare and expensive musical instrument, to a young musician Vyacheslav Pershakov.

Natalia sponsors travelling of children to summer camps and junior boxing championships in Kirov.

In 2018, British authorities closed Natalia's charity fund.

In 2019, Natalia registered her own brands in various fields, hoping to use it in the future for production of perfume, clothes and shoes, food products, alcoholic and non-alcoholic drinks and even teleshop programs. In 2019, Russian Federal Service for Intellectual Property already registered 5 of 11 trademarks, including "Natalia Rotenberg", "The World of Aristocratka", "Margo" and "The First Lady".

In 2019, after marrying Tigran Arzakantsyan, she registered two wine production companies in Armenia.

In 2020, she participated in the RF President Administration competition called "Leaders of Russia - Politics".

On 3 April 2022, Arzakantsyan founded the Strength of the Fatherland party, with Rotenberg being elected as chairperson of the supreme council. On 6 June 2022, the party announced that Rotenberg would be nominated to run for Mayor of Yerevan in upcoming Yerevan City Council elections. However, due to Rotenberg's lack of proficiency of the Armenian language, the party nominated another candidate.

== Personal life ==
Natalia has two children from the marriage with Arkady Rotenberg – a daughter, and a son. From 2012 to 2018, she resided with her children in London, where she was engaged in construction and design businesses and established her own clothing brand collections.

The couple divorced in April 2013. The divorce proceedings began in March 2013, the decision to terminate the marriage was joint. Natalia tried to appeal the decision to the Tushinsky Court of Moscow, but the Court left the decision unchanged, and it became legally effective on 2 August 2013. After that, Natalia Rotenberg filed a claim asking to invalidate the marriage contract: In this case, all the property acquired in marriage would have been divided in half, but the Tushinsky District Court of Moscow dismissed the claim.

In 2015, the mass media reported that Natalia had filed a lawsuit against her ex-husband in London in attempt to get a compensation from the billionaire. At that moment, Arkady Rotenberg was under the EU sanctions, which complicated the payment of alimony. The trial judge was Philip Moor, and the case was called "R V R".

In September 2016, The Times filed a lawsuit to the High Court of London asking to give the names of a foreign businessman and his ex-wife engaged in lengthy court proceedings about financial issues. On 25 July 2017, the court decided to disclose the details of financial agreements between Arkady and Natalia Rotenbergs; after that, Arkady Rotenberg appealed to the Supreme Court of the United Kingdom asking to keep the agreement details in secret. In February 2018, the Supreme Court took a decision to declassify the divorce procedure of the parties.

In 2020, the High Court of London ruled that Arkady Rotenberg had to transfer a $36.2 mln worth Ribsden house near Bagshot village in Surrey County to his ex-wife Natalia; this decision was taken by judge Philip Moor. Arkady Rotenberg appealed this decision to the Court of Appeal; according to Rotenberg's lawyers, he has never been the owner of this house.

In April 2020, the media reported that Natalia Rotenberg was going to marry Tigran Arzakantsyan, an Armenian businessman, cognac manufacturer, and ex-deputy of the Armenian Parliament, who himself has three children from his first marriage.

== Awards ==
In 2018, at the international conference "Future is ours", Rotenberg was awarded with the "Gold Order Woman of the World" and the international award "Woman's Pride". She was awarded with the prize "Heritage of the Nation" for service to the society and contribution to the heritage of the nation. She received gratitudes for co-operation and development of the physical education and sport in Kirov region. The government of Moscow awarded her the prize "Hero of Moscow" in 2018. Rotenberg was awarded with a gold medal "Peacemaker" on The Fifth International Peace Forum in Crimea.
