= Tigran Arzakantsyan =

Armenian businessman and politician (born 1996)

- Տիգրան Արզաքանցյան

Personal details
- Born: 7 August 1966 (age 60) Kamo, Armenian SSR, Soviet Union
- Party: Strength of the Fatherland
- Spouse: Natalia Rotenberg
- Children: 3

Tigran Grishayi Arzakantsyan (Armenian: Տիգրան Գրիշայի Արզաքանցյան; born 7 August 1966) is an Armenian businessman and politician who formerly served as a deputy of the National Assembly of Armenia. He is the owner of the Great Valley wine and cognac company and is the current Chairman of the Strength of the Fatherland party.

== Biography ==
Tigran Arzakantsyan was born on 7 August 1966 in the city of Kamo of the Armenian SSR (now Gavar in Gegharkunik Province).

From 1979 to 1984, he studied at the Zootechnic and Veterinary College of Kamo and graduated as a veterinary technician. After graduation he was drafted into the Soviet Army and served there from 1984 to 1986.

From 1986 to 1998, Arzakantsyan was engaged in business in Russia. In 1998, together with Robert Azaryan he established the Great Valley wine and cognac company. In 2003, he founded the Tigran Arzakantsyan Charitable Foundation, which is managed by his mother, Varsenik Grigoryan. In 2008, he bought one of the factories of Hine Cognac House located in France.

Outside of the cognac business, he also owns 51% of the shares in Paramount Gold Mining CJSC, which is engaged in gold mining in Armenia.

== Political activity ==
In the parliamentary elections on 25 May 2003, he was elected as a deputy of the third convocation of the National Assembly of Armenia from the Republican Party of Armenia. He was a member of the standing committee on financial, credit, budgetary and economic issues.

In the parliamentary elections on 12 May 2007, he was elected as a deputy of the fourth convocation of the National Assembly from the Republican Party of Armenia in election district 22 of Gegharkunik Province. From 19 June 2007 to 11 July 2008, he was a member of the standing committee on healthcare, maternity and childhood, then until 4 May 2009 he was a member of the standing committee on social issues, from 4 May 2009 until the end of the fourth convocation he a member of a standing committee on economic issues. A number of Armenian media sources named him one of the most frequent absentees of parliament sessions.

In 2016, the State Revenue Committee of Armenia charged him with inflicting of major damage to the state.

In the 2017 parliamentary elections, he again ran for parliament from the Republican Party of Armenia in Gegharkunik Province, but he lost to his party fellows in his election district and was not elected as a deputy of the new convocation.

Arzakantsyan was set to head the electoral list of the Democratic Party of Armenia in the 2021 Armenian parliamentary election held on 20 June 2021. However, on 10 June, he was disqualified from running for office as he was unable to meet the residency requirement (out of the past 1,461 days, Arzakantsyan had been absent from the country for 1,005 of them). In order to participate in an election, a candidate must be resident in Armenia for four years preceding the election date.

On 3 April 2022, Arzakantsyan founded the Strength of the Fatherland party and was nominated its Chairman.

== Personal life ==
Arzakantsyan has three children from his first marriage. He is currently married to Natalia Rotenberg.
