= Fix Price =

Russian retail chain of variety stores

- Revenue: $4.05 billion (2022)
- Operating income: $6 million (2022)
- Net income: $313 million (2022)
- Total assets: $1.65 billion (2022)
- Total equity: $427 million (2022)
- Website: https://fix-price.com/

Fix Price is a Russia-based chain of discount variety stores. At the end of 2022, the chain of stores consisted of 5,663 stores in Russia, Belarus, Kazakhstan, Uzbekistan, Latvia, Georgia, Kyrgyzstan, Mongolia and Armenia. As of October 2023, the company has 6,141 stores.

== History ==
The company was founded in 2007 by Sergei Lomakin and Artem Khachatryan, founders and executives of the former Kopeyka supermarket chain. The trading strategy, brand and design of the Fix Price chain of stores were developed by the British consulting company Campbell Rigg.

The first Fix Price store was opened in December 2007. During 2008, the first 60 Fix Price stores were opened.

In 2014, the chain consisted of 1,543 stores. As of September 2015, the network already included 1,930 stores. In 2016, the Fix Price network included 2,097 stores, of which about 400 were franchised.

In 2016, the first chain stores were opened in Georgia and Kazakhstan.

As of February 2018, the network consisted of 2,510 stores in Russia, as well as several franchise stores in Latvia, Belarus, Kazakhstan, Uzbekistan and Georgia. In March 2019, the 3,000th store was opened in Moscow, at the end of 2019 the Fix Price network included 3,306 stores.

In Russia in 2019, according to Oliver Wyman, the company's share in the segment of goods at fixed low prices (variety value retail) was 93%. In 2020, the network increased by 655 stores, the total number of company personnel was 32 thousand.

Goldman Sachs Group, Inc. acquired a stake in the company in 2020.

By the end of 2020, Fix Price had revenue of 190 billion rubles ($2.6 billion) in a year.

In March 2021, Fix Price held an IPO on the London and Moscow stock exchanges. Investors were offered 21% of the authorized capital of the company (178.4 million global depositary receipts for $9.75 each). The company raised about $1.7 billion. The share of each of the co-founders decreased from 41.66% to 35.43%. Selling shareholders still have a put option for another 26.8 million GDRs. Now Fix Price's capitalization is estimated at $8.3 billion. This is the largest listing of a Russian company in ten years.

In July 2021, the chain crossed the 4,600-store mark.

In September 2021, Samonico Holdings of the Marathon group of Alexander Vinokurov disinvested from the capital of Fix Price by selling its 2,98% stake (25,36 million GDR) at a 10% discount on the total of 850 million shares.

In February 2022, Fix Price Group announced plans to change the company's jurisdiction. Previously, the company was registered in the British Virgin Islands. On June 15, 2022, Fix Price Group received permanent registration in Cyprus.

In September 2022, the chain included 5,462 stores, including 4,855 owned and 607 franchised. As of December 31, 2022, Fix Price had 5,663 stores.

In 2023, the company opened its first two stores in Mongolia. As of June 2023, Fix Price had 6,000 stores.

In October 2023, Fix Price Group received a listing on the Astana International Exchange (AIX). As of October 2023, the company has 6,141 stores.

On November 9, 2023, Fix Price shareholders voted to change jurisdiction from Cyprus to Kazakhstan.
