= Uzh Hayrenyats =

Armenian political party

Uzh Hayrenyats Strength of the Fatherland
- Leader: Tigran Arzakantsyan
- Founded: 2022
- Headquarters: Yerevan
- Ideology: Armenian nationalism
- National Assembly: 0 / 107

Website
- www.ujhay.am/

Uzh Hayrenyats (Armenian: Հայրենիքի զորություն), also known as Strength of the Fatherland or Strength of the Homeland, is a political party in Armenia.

== History ==
The Strength of the Fatherland party was founded on 3 April 2022 during a party congress held in Yerevan. During the congress, Tigran Arzakantsyan was elected as party Chairman while Arzakantsyan's wife, Natalia Rotenberg was elected as the chairperson of the supreme council. Arzakantsyan had previously served as a deputy in the National Assembly as a member of the Republican Party of Armenia. Prior to the 2021 Armenian parliamentary elections, Arzakantsyan announced his intent to participate in the elections with the Democratic Party of Armenia, but was disqualified by the Central Electoral Commission of Armenia from running for office as he was unable to meet residency requirements.

The party does not maintain any representation within the National Assembly and currently acts as an extra-parliamentary force.

On 6 June 2022, the party announced that Natalia Rotenberg would be nominated to run for Mayor of Yerevan in Yerevan City Council elections. Although the party had initially nominated Rotenberg as mayoral candidate, the party ultimately nominated Nelli Harutyunyan as their candidate due to Natalia Rotenberg's lack of proficiency of the Armenian language.

On 20 September 2022, Tigran Arzakantsyan held a meeting with the Prime Minister of Armenia, Nikol Pashinyan. The sides discussed cooperation among extra-parliamentary groups.

Following the 2023 Yerevan City Council election, the party won just 0.74% of the vote, failing to win any seats in the Yerevan City Council.

== Ideology ==
Tigran Arzakantsyan has pledged to collaborate with "patriots" across the country and the Armenian diaspora to find solutions to issues currently facing Armenia and Artsakh. On 18 March 2022, Arzakantsyan stated, "I appeal to you with a call for unity, let's unite around the Strength of the Fatherland party. Your participation will further strengthen and increase our common, unified National Force, which will become the guarantee of our long-term security, development and empowerment."

The party also supports fighting corruption, improving the quality of life for citizens, further developing the economy of the country, ensure secure borders, and modernize and strengthen the Armenian army.

== See also ==
- Programs of political parties in Armenia
