= Stroygazmontazh =

Russian infrastructure firm

- Native name: Стройгазмонтаж
- Company type: Private
- Industry: Infrastructure
- Founded: 2008; 18 years ago
- Headquarters: Moscow, Russia
- Key people: Arkady Rotenberg; (Founder)
- Revenue: $6.2 billion (2017)
- Operating income: $247 million (2017)
- Net income: $258 million (2017)
- Total assets: $4.45 billion (2017)
- Total equity: $544 million (2017)
- Number of employees: 16,000 (2017)
- Website: www.ooosgm.com

Stroygazmontazh (Russian: Стро̀йга̀змонта́ж), also called the S.G.M. Group, is an infrastructure construction firm that operates in Russia primarily via its subsidiaries, specializing in the creation of oil and gas transportation systems. The company was founded in 2008 with operations in construction—particularly of oil and gas infrastructure—in Russia. According to the RBK Group, it is the 44th largest company in Russia by income, with an annual ₽276 billion in revenue.

== History ==
=== Foundation ===
Stroygazmontazh was initially founded in 2008 by Russian businessman and oligarch Arkady Rotenberg after he purchased five companies under the control of Russian oil and gas giant Gazprom. Rotenberg is a close friend of Russian President Vladimir Putin, which has led to the S.G.M. Group and other firms under Rotenberg's control winning a number of Russian government contracts.

By January 2019, Arkady Rotenberg through his Stroygazmontazh LLC and his companies, along with Nikolai Shamalov and Yuri Kovalchuk through their Rossiya Bank have become the most important investors in Russia's development of the annexed Crimea. Stroygazmontazh built the Crimean Bridge, commencing in February 2016. The road bridge was opened in October 2018, and the rail bridge opened in June 2020. In 2019, the company's revenue amounted to 194 billion rubles.

=== 2019 buyout ===
In early November 2019, Rotenberg's shares in the company were reportedly sold to Gazstroyprom—an infrastructural firm under the administration of Gazprom—for a total of ₽75 billion ($1.18 billion). Stroygazmontazh had been a subcontractor of Gazprom for some time, and had collaborated in building 320 kilometers of onshore pipelines for the Nord Stream 2 project.

== Projects ==
=== Crimean Bridge ===
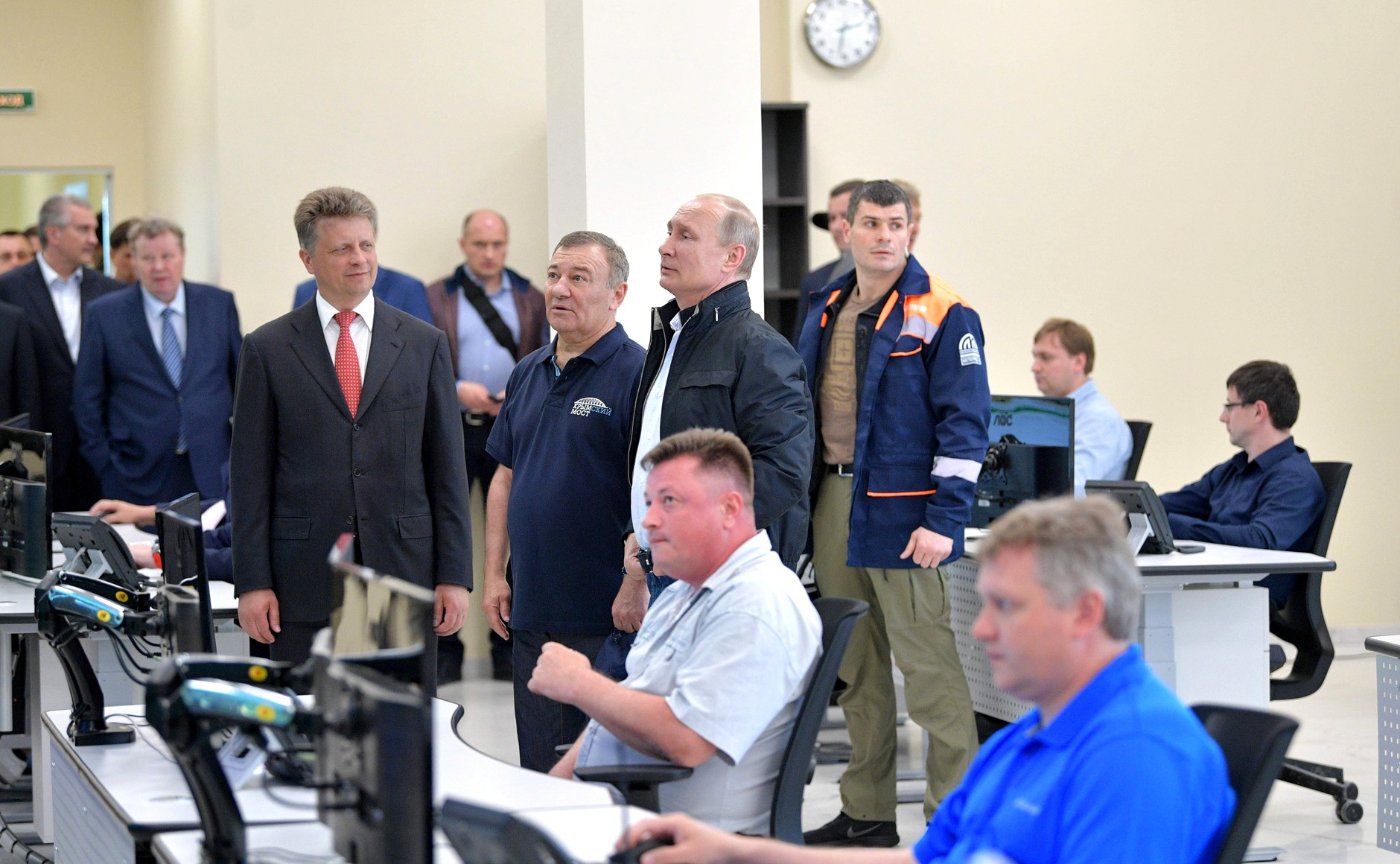
President Vladimir Putin and Arkady Rotenberg at the opening of the Crimean Bridge in May 2018

In 2016 and 2017 it was reported that Stroygazmontazh, with evident ties to Russian President Vladimir Putin, had won a contract in January 2015 to construct the Crimean Bridge providing a two-track railway link, and a four lane automobile and truck, link between Russia and Crimea by crossing the Kerch Strait, and that it had proceeded to begin construction. The Russian government stipulated that Stroygazmontazh was to complete the railway link by August 1, 2019, and fully complete all works on the bridge by December 1, 2019. Stroygazmontazh had never built a major bridge before. Because of the risks of EU sanctions applied in July 2018, no international insurance company was willing to underwrite the potential $3 billion loss if the project went wrong—thus, a small Crimean insurance company underwrote it. Stroygazmontazh commenced construction in February 2016. The road bridge was opened in October 2018, and the rail bridge opened in June 2020.
