= Arkady Rotenberg =

Russian billionaire businessman (born 1951)

- Аркадий Ротенберг
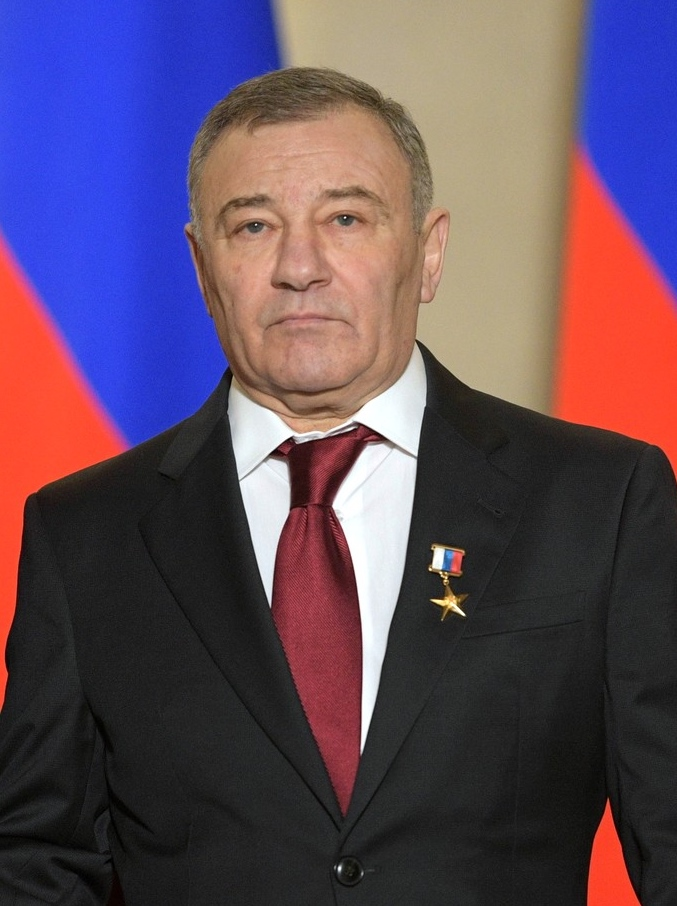
- Rotenberg in 2020
- Born: Arkady Romanovich Rotenberg; 15 December 1951 (age 74); Leningrad, Russian SFSR, Soviet Union
- Education: Lesgaft National State University of Physical Education, Sport and Health
- Occupations: Co-founder of SMP Bank, Head of SGM
- Spouses: Unnamed (divorced) Natalia Rotenberg (m. 2005; div. 2015)
- Children: 5
- Awards: Order of Friendship; Hero of Labour of the Russian Federation; Order "For Merit to the Fatherland" 3rd class; Order of Honour; Russian Federation Presidential Certificate of Honour; Order of Holy Prince Daniel of Moscow

Arkady Romanovich Rotenberg (Russian: Аркадий Романович Ротенберг; born 15 December 1951) is a Russian billionaire businessman and oligarch. With his brother Boris Rotenberg, he was co-owner of the Stroygazmontazh (S.G.M. group), the largest construction company for gas pipelines and electrical power supply lines in Russia.

In 2023, Forbes estimated Rotenberg's wealth at $3.5 billion. He is a close confidant, business partner, and childhood friend of president Vladimir Putin. Rotenberg became a billionaire through lucrative state-sponsored construction projects and oil pipelines. The Pandora Papers leak implicated Rotenberg in facilitating and maintaining elaborate networks of offshore wealth for Russian political and economic elites.

Since 2014, following the Russian annexation of Crimea, Arkady Rotenberg has been subject to sanctions by the United States government.

== Biography ==
He was born in 1951 in Leningrad, where his father, Roman, worked in management at the Red Dawn telephone factory, allowing the family to avoid living in a communal apartment. In 1963, when he was age twelve, Rotenberg and Vladimir Putin both joined Anatoly Rakhlin's sambo club. Rotenberg is a Russian Jew.

In 1978, Rotenberg graduated from the Lesgaft National State University of Physical Education, Sport and Health and became a judo trainer. After Putin returned to Russia in 1990, Rotenberg trained with him several times a week. During the 1990s, Rotenberg and his brother, Boris, who had moved to Finland, traded in petroleum products. When Putin became vice-mayor, Rotenberg secured funding from Gennady Timchenko to found Yavara-Neva, a professional judo club. Later, after the club won nine European Judo Championships and trained four Olympic champions, it was given a new state-funded $180 million facility, including a thousand-seat arena and a yacht club.

In 2000, Putin, who had become President of Russia, created Rosspirtprom, a state-owned enterprise controlling 30% of Russia's vodka market, and put Rotenberg in control. In 2001, Rotenberg and his brother founded the SMP bank (Russian: банк «Северный морской путь»), which operates in 40 Russian cities with over 100 branches, more than half of them in the Moscow area. SMP oversees the operation of more than 900 ATM-machines. SMP bank also became a leading large-diameter gas pipe supplier.

Gazprom often appears to have paid Rotenberg inflated prices. In 2007, Gazprom rejected an earlier plan to build a 350-mile pipeline and instead paid Rotenberg $45 billion, 300% of ordinary costs, to build a 1,500 mile pipeline to the Arctic Circle. In 2008, Rotenberg formed Stroygazmontazh (SGM) with five companies he had purchased from Gazprom for $348 million. In 2009, the company earned over $2 billion in revenue.

Rotenberg then bought Northern Europe Pipe Project, which eventually supplied 90% of Gazprom's large diameter pipes and operated at a 30% profit margin, twice the industry average. In 2013, Gazprom increased Rotenberg's contract for a Krasnodar pipeline by 45%, then continued payments for a year after the Bulgarian segment was canceled.

While he was the Minister of Transport of the Russian Federation from May 2004 to 2012, Igor Levitin ensured in 2010 that Arkady Rotenberg's firms, Mostotrest, constructed the toll roads on Russian federal highways.

Rotenberg is the president of the Hockey Club Dynamo Moscow. In 2013, he became a member of the committee of the International Judo Federation. In preparation for the 2014 Winter Olympics in Sochi, Rotenberg won contracts worth $7 billion, including a $2 billion coastal highway and an underwater gas pipeline that came in at 300% more than average costs.

Rotenberg was named in the Panama Papers. Those leaked legal documents show Rotenberg sent $231 million in loans to a company in the British Virgin Islands in 2013.

In 2013, Rotenberg became the chairman of the Enlightenment Publishing House, which had once been the biggest supplier for textbooks in the Soviet Union. After Enlightenment became a private company in 2011, the government of the Russian Federation started to make several changes in that sector. In 2013, an internal council was formed by the Ministry of Education to check all textbooks. Many of Enlightenment's competitors' books did not pass this new evaluation, and so Enlightenment won about 70% of the contracts for new textbooks in the Russian Federation in 2014.

In 2015, Arkady Rotenberg sold to his son Igor Rotenberg a number of assets including up to 79% of Gazprom Drilling (Bureniye), 28% of the road construction company Mostotrest, and 33.3% of Jersey-based TPS Real Estate Holdings Ltd. Alexander Ponomarenko and Aleksandr Skorobogatko own 66.6% of TPC Real Estates Holdings.

It was reported that Arkady Rotenberg made this move after being placed on the U.S. sanctions list.

== Personal life ==
In 2005, Rotenberg married his second wife Natalia Rotenberg. Their two children live in the United Kingdom with Natalia. They divorced in 2015 in the U.K. While the financial details of the divorce are private, the agreement includes division of the use of a £35 million Surrey mansion and a £8 million apartment in London. The couple's lawyers obtained a secrecy order preventing media in the U.K. from reporting on the divorce. The order was overturned on appeal.

His older three children include Igor (Russian: Игорь Аркадьевич; born 9 September 1974), who is a Russian billionaire businessman. His daughter Liliya (Russian: Лилия Аркадьевна; born 17 April 1978) is a doctor. His son Paul (Russian: Павел Аркадьевич; born 29 February 2000), is a competitive hockey player.

=== Sanctions ===
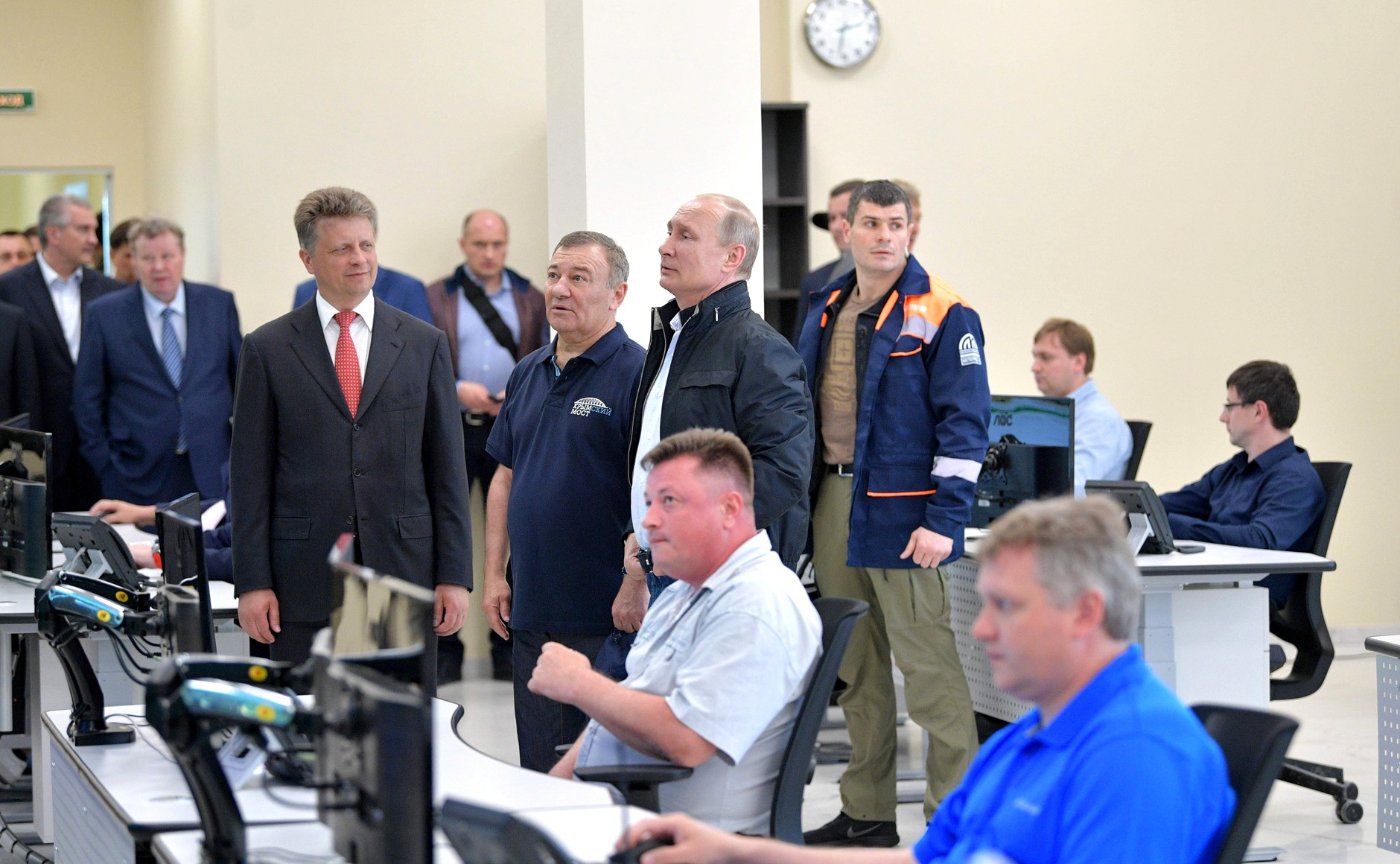
The opening of the Crimean Bridge in May 2018

As a result of the 2014 Russian annexation of Crimea, U.S. president Barack Obama signed an executive order instructing his government to impose sanctions on the Rotenberg brothers; they were placed on the Specially Designated Nationals List.

As a result of the sanctions, Visa and MasterCard stopped servicing SMP Bank. In September 2014, Italy seized €30 million of Rotenberg's real estate, including four villas in Sardinia and Tarquinia, and a hotel in Rome. The U.S added Arkady and Igor Rotenberg on their blacklist of Russian oligarchs, freezing assets for US$65 million in 2014. In November 2016, the General Court of the European Union confirmed the sanctions against Russia and the freezing of Arkady's funds which had taken effect on 30 July 2014, but limited to the new properties added by the EU Council in March 2015.

In September 2014, Novaya Gazeta published a journalistic inquiry of Anna Politkovskaja and Alexei Navalny, revealing that Igor Rotenberg, son of Arkady, secretly controlled an estate in Monte Argentario through a society registered in Vaduz. The Russian State Duma then proposed a bill, known as the Rotenberg Law, allowing sanctioned Russians to get compensated by the state, but it was declined.

Rotenberg is one of many Russian "oligarchs" named in the Countering America's Adversaries Through Sanctions Act, CAATSA, signed into law by President Donald Trump in 2017.

In July 2020, a report by the United States Committee on Homeland Security and Governmental Affairs determined that companies linked to Rotenberg had evaded sanctions by purchasing more than $18 million in art in between May and November 2014. The purchases were made months after he was sanctioned by the US Treasury Department.

On 3 March 2022, the United States imposed visa restrictions and froze assets of Rotenberg, his sons, and his daughter, following the start of the 2022 Russian invasion of Ukraine. Rotenberg was also sanctioned by the United Kingdom and by New Zealand.

Press research, published in June 2023, showed that Rotenberg had financed the purchase of a mansion in Kitzbühel, Austria back in 2013. Rotenberg's firm Olpon Investments, located in Cyprus, sent some €11.5 million to the Meridian Trade Bank in Latvia from where it was lent to the Cyprus-based Wayblue Investments Limited. Wayblue concluded the purchase in Austria and was still listed as owner of the property in 2023. In 2017 the loan itself was transferred from the Latvian bank to Cresco Securities in Estonia. A Cresco representative claimed in 2023, that the loan was never paid back to them. Since Austrian authorities were not able to identify the owners of Wayblue Investments Limited, no legal action was taken. According to local witnesses, Vladimir Putin's daughter Maria Vorontsova stayed in the house on a regular basis.

=== Wealth ===
Rotenberg's personal wealth has been estimated in July 2021 at $2.9 billion. He used to own a 2009 Bombardier Global 5000 (registered M-BRRB); however, he was forced to sell it due to the sanctions placed upon him. He owns a 2011 Benetti 65 meter yacht named Rahil. The yacht can accommodate ten guests in seven staterooms.

In 2022, Arkady Rotenberg was included in the 6000 List compiled by the Anti-Corruption Foundation.

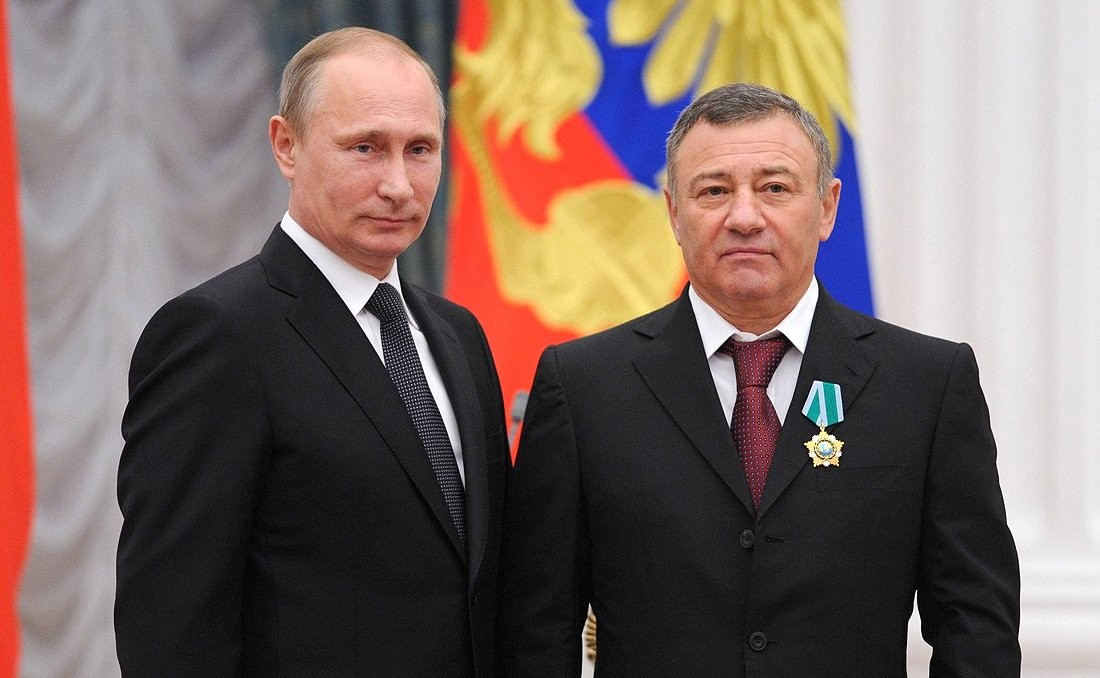
Vladimir Putin and Rotenberg during the awarding the Order of Friendship. Moscow, Kremlin. October 2012.

=== Ownership of "Putin's Palace" ===
In 2021, Rotenberg stated that he was the owner of "Putin's Palace", a mansion in southern Russia that was linked to Putin by the anti-corruption activist Alexei Navalny. Rotenberg explained that the property was intended to be developed as an apartment hotel, rather than a private residence.
