= Novorossiysk Commercial Sea Port =

Commercial port operator in Russia

OJSC Novorossiysk Commercial Sea Port
- Native name: ОАО Новороссийский морской торговый порт
- Company type: Public (OAO)
- Traded as: MCX: NMTP; LSE: NCSP
- Industry: Shipping industry
- Founded: 1957; 69 years ago
- Headquarters: Novorossiysk, Russia
- Key people: Aleksandr Anatolievich Ponomarenko, (Chairman)
- Products: Sea port services
- Revenue: ₽76.5 billion (2025)
- Operating income: ₽46.7 billion (2025)
- Net income: ₽40.6 billion (2025)
- Total assets: ₽253 billion (2025)
- Total equity: ₽194 billion (2025)
- Owner: Federal Agency for State Property Management (20%)
- Website: https://en.ncsp.ru/

JSC Novorossiysk Commercial Sea Port (NCSP Group) (Новороссийский морской торговый порт) is the third largest port operator in Europe and Russia's largest commercial sea port operator. The company is headquartered in the city of Novorossiysk on the Black Sea coast. The company operates the Port of Novorossiysk and the Baltic ports of Primorsk and Baltiysk. In 2017, the company oversaw a cargo turnover of 143.5 million tons. The company handled about 18% of total cargo turnover in Russia in 2017.

== Overview ==
The company provides stevedoring services, including shipment of oil and oil products, other liquid cargo, dry bulk cargo and general cargo. It provides tug, towing and mooring services for vessels in and around the Novorossiysk seaport, and also provides emergency, hazardous materials response and waste management services at the Port.

Following the 1998 Russian financial crisis, business partners Alexander Ponomarenko and Alexander Skorobogatko started to purchase shares in cargo companies that they eventually combined to form NCSP Group. In 2011, the majority stake in NCSP was sold to Summa Capital and Transneft for $2.5 billion.

In 2017, the company oversaw a cargo turnover of 143.5 million tons. The company handled about 18% of total cargo turnover in Russia in 2017.

Revenue in 2008 was $653 mln, while net profit was $95 mln. In 2017, the net profit of NCSP Group was $439 million. This marked a 31% from $632 million in 2016. Revenue, however, increased 4% to reach $899 million.

In February 2018, Summa Group announced it would sell its shares in NCSP Group to Transneft, who currently hold 30.5% of NCSP through their subsidiaries. After the arrest of the Magomedovs in April, Summa Group and Transneft have stopped negotiating the sale of NCSP stake.

On April 6, 2018, it was announced that the shareholders of NCSP Group will elect a new board of directors on April 13, 2018. This is in response to the arrest of Summa Group co-owners Ziyavudin Magomedov and his brother Magomed Magomedov.

== Ownership ==
Novoport Holding owns 50.1% of the shares of NCSP. Novoport is made up of Transneft Group and Summa Group. The Federal Property Management Agency owns 20% of shares, and Transneft Services holds another 10.5%. 14.4% of shares are shared publicly on the Moscow and London stock exchanges. Transneft owns a 35.5% of NCSP, 25% via shares in Novoport Holding, and the remaining 10.5% of directly via their subsidiary Transneft Services.

== Baltic Ports ==
JSC NCSP also controls the Baltic ports of Primorsk and Baltitysk. In 2017, Primorsk shipping was down 34.1% year-to-year, witnessing a cargo turnover of 3.7 million tons. Baltitysk port, on the other hand, saw an 8% increase in TEU handled, accompanied by a 6% decrease in tonnage.

== Summa Group Controversy ==
In February 2018, Summa Group announced it would sell its shares in NCSP Group to Transneft, who currently hold 30.5% of NCSP through their subsidiaries. After the arrest of the Magomedovs in April, Summa Group and Transneft have stopped negotiating the sale of NCSP stake.

On April 6, 2018, it was announced that the shareholders of NCSP Group will elect a new board of directors on April 13, 2018. This is in response to the arrest of Summa Group co-owners Ziyavudin Magomedov and his brother Magomed Magomedov.

== Naval Operations ==
The port of Novorossiysk is host to part of Russian Navy’s Black Sea Fleet. In 2017, it was reported that the port of Novorossiysk would upgrade its naval base facilities. Construction of the naval base will be completed in 2020, according to an Admiral of the Russian Navy.

Upon completion of the naval base, the Black Sea Fleet will officially move its headquarters to the Novorossiysk port.
