= Boris Rotenberg (businessman) =

Russian oligarch (born 1957)

- Борис Ротенберг
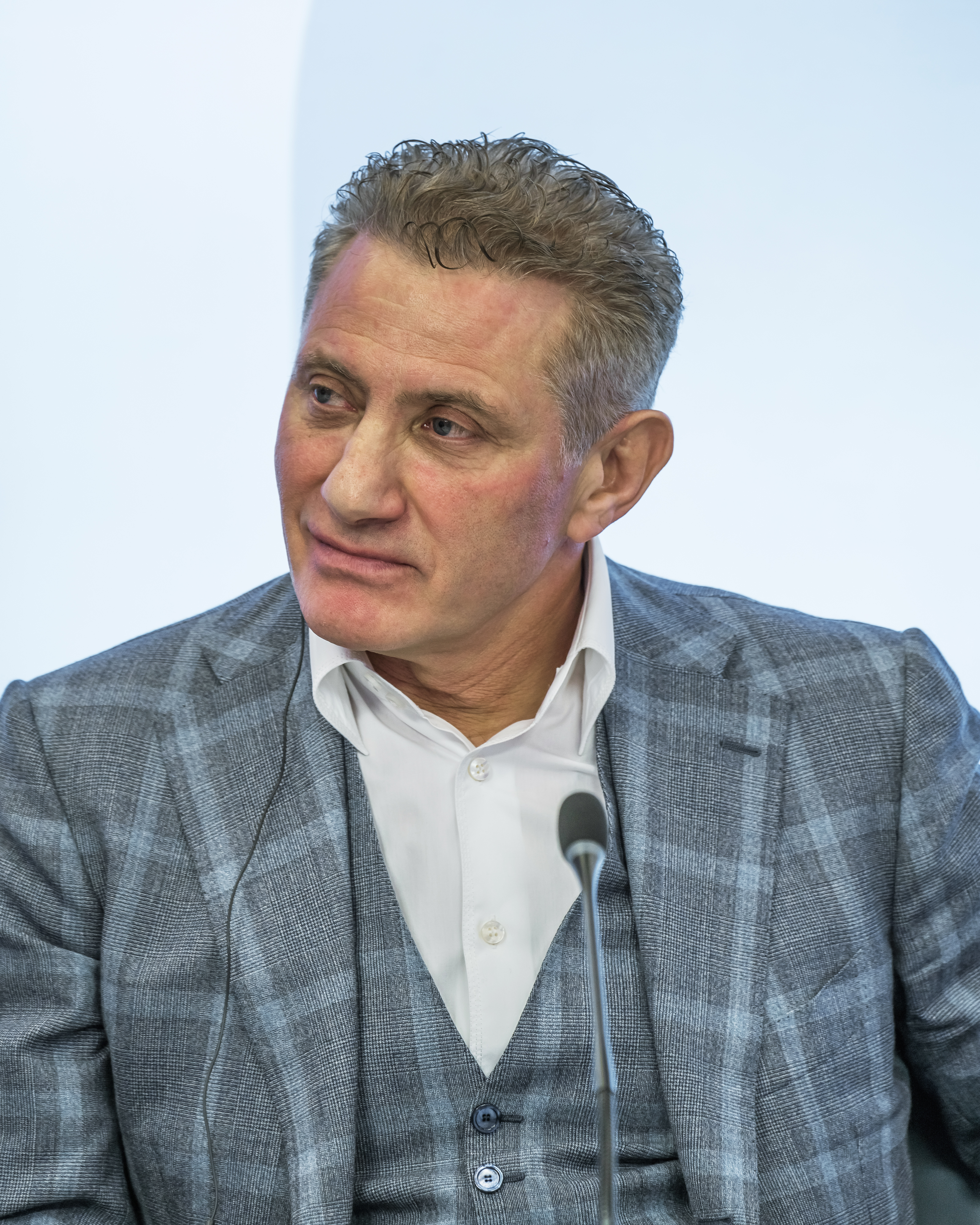
- Rotenberg in 2018
- Born: Boris Romanovich Rotenberg; 3 January 1957 (age 69); Leningrad, Russian SFSR, Soviet Union (now Saint Petersburg, Russia)
- Occupation: Businessman
- Known for: Co-founder of SMP Bank

Boris Romanovich Rotenberg (Russian: Борис Романович Ротенберг; born 3 January 1957) is a Russian businessman and oligarch. He is co-owner (with his brother Arkady Rotenberg) of the SGM (StroyGazMontazh) group, the largest construction company for gas pipelines and electrical power supply lines in Russia. He was listed by Forbes as Russia's 69th wealthiest person in 2016 with a net worth of $1.07 billion. He is considered a close confidant of president Vladimir Putin.

Since 2014, following Russia's annexation of Crimea, Rotenberg has been subject to sanctions by the United States government. After Russia's invasion of Ukraine in 2022, the UK government has also imposed sanctions on Rotenberg.

== Biography ==
Rotenberg was born in 1957 in a family of Jewish descent. He was very involved in martial arts between 1968 and 1978, particularly judo. He trained alongside Vladimir Putin and won several awards for the Soviet Union. In 1992, he became a professional judo trainer in Helsinki. In 1998, he returned to St. Petersburg.

In 2001, he and his brother founded the SMP bank, which operates in 40 Russian cities with over 100 branches, more than half of them in the Moscow area. SMP oversees the operation of more than 900 ATM machines.

Based on his friendship with Vladimir Putin, his company became closely aligned with Gazprom. Rotenberg is a member of the St. Petersburg Connection, a powerful energy lobby under the leadership of Putin.

He was involved in 20 construction projects for the Sochi Winter Olympics worth 5 billion Euro. The largest site was the coastal highway to Adler, where the Olympic Park was constructed for the numerous sport arenas.

From July 2013 to 17 July 2015, Rotenberg was the president of FC Dynamo Moscow. He is also the president of the Russian Judo federation. After leaving Dynamo, he bought another football club, FC Dynamo Saint Petersburg, which was eventually moved to Sochi under the name PFC Sochi and was promoted to the Russian Premier League for the 2019–20 season.

As a result of the annexation of Crimea by the Russian Federation, the federal government of the United States under Barack Obama blacklisted the Rotenberg brothers and other close friends of the Russian president, including Sergei Ivanov and Gennadi Timchenko. In July 2014, the European Union also blacklisted Boris Romanovich Rotenberg's company Giprotransmost for conducting the feasibility study of the construction of a bridge from Russia to the Autonomous Republic of Crimea.

On 27 March 2014, both Visa and MasterCard executed the boycott of SMP Bank, Investcapitalbank and Investitsionny Soyuz (Investment Union) bank. However, just a few days later, it was announced that the institutions do not meet the criteria under which the U.S. Treasury introduces economic sanctions.

Rotenberg was named in the Panama Papers.

Rotenberg also holds Finnish citizenship.

In January 2020, Finnish national broadcaster YLE reported that Rotenberg had lost a court case against four Finnish banks in Helsinki District Court. Rotenberg had complained that the banks did not grant him basic banking services and he was not able to make even small transfers using his Finnish accounts. Helsinki District Court resolved the lawsuit by deciding Rotenberg has no right to basic banking services because he does not permanently reside in European Economic Area. Rotenberg was ordered to pay the four banks' legal costs of 530,000 euros.

On 22 February 2022, Boris along with his nephew Igor Rotenberg had sanctions imposed on them by the United Kingdom government as a result of the Russo-Ukrainian crisis. On 3 March, the United States imposed sanctions on Rotenberg, his wife, and sons. In April 2022, Rotenberg had sanctions imposed on him by the EU.

== Motorsport ==
SMP Bank has sponsored auto racing teams under the brand SMP Racing. Russian drivers like Mikhail Aleshin, Sergey Sirotkin and Vitaly Petrov have competed in Formula 1, Formula 2, the FIA World Endurance Championship, IndyCar Series and the European Le Mans Series.

Rotenberg also owns BR Engineering, a race car constructor.

In 2024, Rotenberg was elected president of the Russian Automobile Federation.

== Wealth ==
In January 2022 Forbes estimated his net worth to be $1.2B USD. He owned a Bombardier Challenger 300 registered M-ARRH however in 2019 it was seized by Credit Suisse and marketed for sale by Boutsen Aviation due to Rotenberg having sanctions put on him.

== Personal life ==
Boris Rotenberg's elder brother is Arkady Rotenberg.

Mr. Rotenberg's two elder sons are Roman Rotenberg, chief of marketing for the ice hockey club SKA St. Petersburg and Boris Rotenberg, a former professional football player.

His nephew, Igor Rotenberg (Russian: Ротенберг, Игорь Аркадьевич; born September 9, 1974) is a Russian billionaire businessman.
