= United Grain Company =

Russian grain trading company

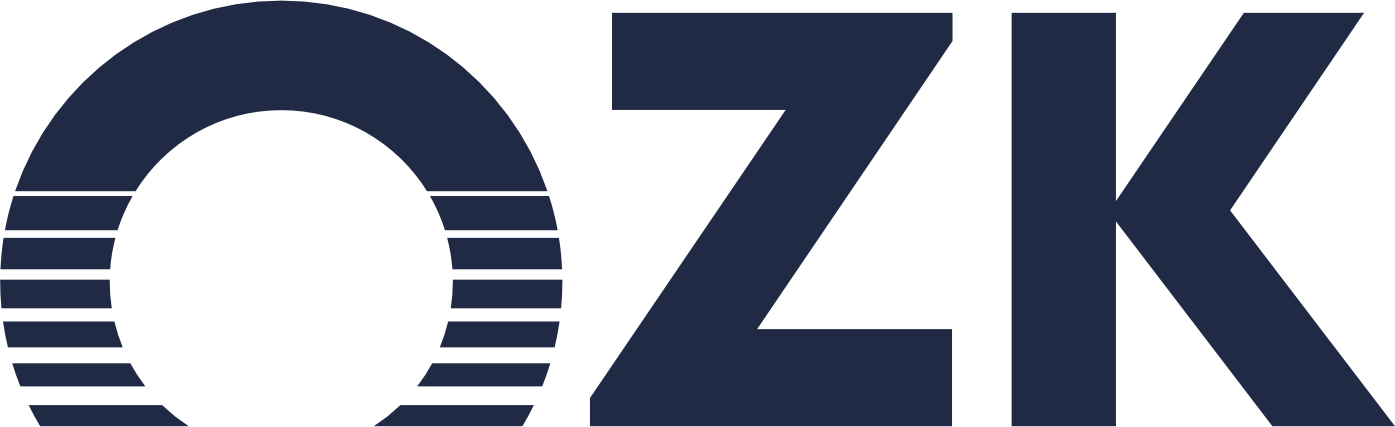
- Company type: Joint-stock company
- Predecessor: FGUP "Federal Agency for the Regulation of the Food Market" (Russian: ФГУП «Федеральное агентство по регулированию продовольственного рынка»)
- Founded: 2007
- Total assets: $895 million (2020)
- Website: ozk-group.ru

United Grain Company (Russian: Объединенная зерновая компания, or OZK Group) is a Russian grain trading company based in Moscow and established in 2007. The company conducts grain procurement activities in Russia, and manages exports on international markets.

== History ==
The United Grain Company was established on March 21, 2007 as a result of the transformation of the FGUP "Federal Agency for the Regulation of the Food Market" under the Ministry of Agriculture of the Russian Federation, the main function of which was the implementation of state regulation of the grain market.

United Grain Company, or OZK Group, operates a total of 1,585 rail hopper cars, nine grain elevators with a capacity of 720,000 tons and three milling plants with an annual capacity of 490,000 tons. Total export of grain, for 2023/2024 was 3.6 million tons, which generated revenue of 90.7 billion rubles, through two port terminals with a total annual transshipment capacity of 7.8 million tons. Primary transshipment is through the Novorossiysk Grain Plant on the Black Sea, which is scheduled for upgrade to a figure of 1.5 times, currently delivering to over twenty countries worldwide. Location of OZK Group's export facility on the Black Sea, which is a warm water port, allows for operations year-round.

In 2012 Ziyavudin Magomedov's Summa Group bought a 50% minus one share stake in the company. In 2014 the company agreed to trade grain worth $500 million for oil with Iran.

The company announced plans to build a grain terminal in the Port of Zarubino, in the Russian Far East by 2020, though this appears to be delayed and has not occurred as of August 2025. In August 2017 the Russian Government announced plans to privatize the company by 2019, though again this action has not occurred as of August 2025.

The entity is headed by Dmitry Sergeev, General Director of OZK JSC (Joint Stock Company), as of 2021. In 2022, Grain Export Company (part of the OZK Group) offered the best conditions for the supply of 120 thousand tons of Russian wheat to the General Authority for Supply Commodities of Egypt (GASC). The price was set at about $329 per ton with FOB (Freight On Board) at Novorossiysk.

== Current owners ==
The shareholders of United Grain Company JSC are:

- The Russian Federation represented by the Federal Agency for State Property Management (Federal Property Management Agency) - 50% plus one share, making OZK Group a government entity;
- Demetra Holding - 50% minus one share.
