= Alexander Vinokurov (businessman) =

Russian businessman (born 1982)

- Александр Винокуров
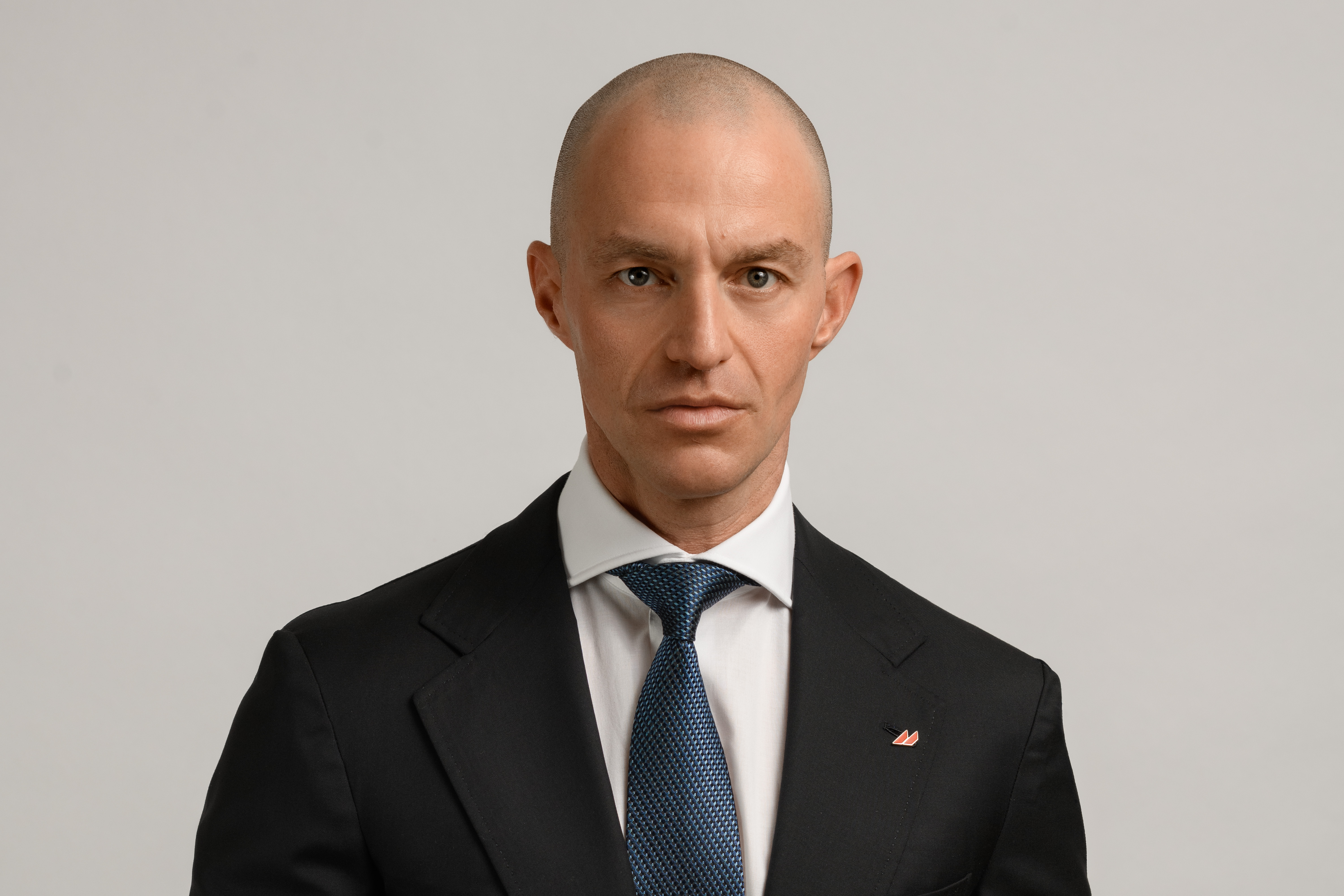
- Born: Alexander Semenovich Vinokurov; 12 October 1982 (age 43); Moscow, Russian SFSR, Soviet Union
- Education: University of Cambridge
- Occupation: Businessman
- Spouse: Ekaterina Lavrova
- Children: 3
- Website: en.marathongroup.ru

Alexander Semenovich Vinokurov (Russian: Александр Семёнович Винокуров, born 12 October 1982 Moscow) is a Russian businessman. He is one of the main owners of the privately held investment company Marathon Group and the largest shareholder of retailer Magnit. Vinokurov was added to the EU Sanctions List on 9 March 2022 for providing a substantial source of revenue to the government of the Russian Federation during the Russo-Ukrainian War.

== Early life ==
Sasha Vinokurov was born in Moscow on 12 October 1982.

== Education ==
In 2004, Vinokurov graduated with honours from the faculty of economics of the University of Cambridge. He received a BA in economics. During the period of his studies, he established a student organisation, and was elected its president.

== Business ==
In 2001, he interned at the Troika Dialog, which was under the control of Andrey Borodin with a large stake owned by Ruben Vardanyan who recommended to Vinokurov to gain employment at Morgan Stanley. (Note: In March 2011, Ruben Vardanyan's controlling stake in Troika Dialog was purchased by Sberbank CIB for $1 billion.)

In 2004, Vinokurov joined the investment banking division of Morgan Stanley (London).

In 2006, he returned to Russia as vice-president of TPG Capital (the world's largest private equity investment firm, with $100 billion in assets under its management), co-founding the company's Russian office. He was involved in the acquisitions of a number of major assets, including shares in VTB upon the state bank's privatisation, stakes in the Moscow office centres White Square and White Gardens, the Hans Van Bylen associated Ontex S.A. (a Belgian manufacturer of personal hygiene products with Russian production facilities), Strauss Coffee and the Lenta hypermarket chain.

In 2011, Vinokurov became president of Summa Group, a diversified private holding company, which has significant investments in port and rail logistics, engineering, construction, telecommunications, oil and gas, oil trading and agriculture. Major deals concluded during his tenure included the acquisition of a 71% stake in Fesco from Sergey Generalov's Industrial Investors and the purchase of a 50% stake in United Grain Company from the state.

In 2014, he became CEO of A1, the investment arm of Alfa Group, which he left in May 2017. Major transactions by A1 during Vinokurov's time there included the sale of Formula Kino, Russia's second-largest cinema chain, to structures controlled by Alexander Mamut (RUB 6.75–7.65 billion)); acquisition of a stake in Polyplastic (one of Russia's largest manufacturers of plastic pipes), and others.

In October 2015, although Alexey Repik, (Note: Alexey Evgenyevich Repik (Russian: Алексей Евгеньевич Репик born 27 August 1979 Moscow, Soviet Union) is a Russian citizen, who lives in San Francisco with his children and wife Polina, who is a model, and established R-Pharm in 2001, which one of the largest supplier's of drugs for HIV and hepatitis in Russia and is a large provider of pharmaceuticals to the Russian military. He has business ties to Darren Blanton through Colt Ventures and Konstantin Nikolaev through Grabr in which they both invested in August 2016 and Repik attended the Liberty Ball in Washington, D.C., on 17 January 2017 with President Trump after the inauguration of Donald Trump. Konstantin Nikolaev's son Andrey Nikolaev was also at Trump's inauguration and was a volunteer at Trump's 2016 presidential campaign headquarters. Repik's mother Valeria Daeva has a very close associate that is with the logistics service of the FSB. Repik is the president of the Russian Business Association Delovaya Rossiya (Russian: Национальная общественная организация «Деловая Россия»). In 2016, R-Pharm supplied 46% of the Russian government contracts and was the largest supplier of pharmaceuticals to the Russian government. In autumn 2022, Repik, in order to protect R-Pharm from sanctions and to allow lllumina to continue to supply materials to Albiogen, transferred his share in R-Pharm to management with Mitsui maintaining a 10% stake which it had acquired in 2017 for $200 million. As of the end of June 2023, R-Pharm had Russia based plants at Yaroslavl, Rostov, Moscow, Kostroma, and Dubna, and plants in Germany and Azerbaijan. At the end of 2022, R-Pharma had 162 billion rubles in revenue from the production of medicines for the treatment of autoimmune, oncological, antiviral and other diseases, as well as materials that are used for medical purposes and veterinary medicine. On 23 June 2023, R-Pharm, which gained a large stake in Albiogen in 2020, transferred 99% of its stake in Albiogen, which specializes in the distribution of foreign high-tech equipment for genetic research and is controlled by Andrey Frolov, who has a majority stake, and the distributor Alexander Yakovlevsky, who has a minority stake, to A-gen (Russian: А-ген). Founded in 2015, Moscow based Albiogen (Russian: Альбиоген) is the sole distributor of the San Diego based United States company Illumina in Russia, Belarus, Kazakhstan and Uzbekistan. In 2018, Albiogen became a supplier of equipment, consumables and software for DNA nucleotide sequencing of a new generation and analysis on DNA biochips from IDT, Vitrolife, CareDx and Pillar. At the end of 2022, the distributor's revenue fell by 35.75% to 5.4 billion rubles, the company's net profit amounted to 1.35 billion rubles. Vladimir Putin's family, especially Katerina Tikhonova, often flies on Repik's Bombardier Global 5000 (M-FINE) On 8 February 2023, the Foreign Secretary of the United Kingdom sanctioned numerous entities and individuals including the IT services company Moscoms LLC, the domain LLCInvest.ru, which is hosted by Moscoms LLC through the servers of Moskomsvyaz, and Alexey Repik who had received funding for his R-Pharm from the Russian Direct Investment Fund and had met with Vladimir Putin four times in 2022 as part of Putin's network of wealth and power. After Russia invaded Ukraine in February 2022, Alexey Evgenyevich Repik was placed on Canada's sanctions list on 19 May 2023 as Elites and close associates of the Regime in Russia who provide military technology and know-how to Russia’s armed forces, family members of listed persons, and members of the Kremlin elite.) who is the founder and owner of R-Pharm, competed for control of SIA, Vinokurov gained control of the Sintez pharmaceutical factory in Kurgan, 75% stake in the Biocom plant in Stavropol, 100% ownership of Mega Pharm and became an indirect 100% owner of SIA International, now known as SIA Group, which was founded in 1993 by Igor Rudinsky (1954-2014) and is one of the largest pharmaceutical companies in Russia.

From 2017, Vinokurov focused on developing co-owned Marathon Group. Marathon Group was founded in 2017 by Vinokurov and Sergei Zakharov. The Company primarily focuses on strategic investments in retail, FMCG, infrastructure and other projects with subsequent development of the assets. Current investments of Marathon Group include shareholdings in a leading food retail chain Magnit, the largest franchisee of quick service restaurants in Russia and Bentus Laboratories (producer of hand sanitizers). Recent highlights: turn-around and sale of pharmaceutical companies Sintez, Biocom and Fort, of pharmaceutical distributor SIA Group, and financial investment in Fix Price (a leading variety value retailer in Russia). (Note: In July 2023, the state of Oman owned company Southern Sea Investment LLC gained control of a stake in Demetra Holding, and, until August 2023, Vinokurov held a stake through SPN, which is a Russian company in his Marathon Group, in the firm Demetra Holding (Russian: «Деметра-Холдинг»), which is the largest vertically integrated grain holding company in Russia with export logistics and trading assets including the grain terminals at the ports of Taman (Russian: «Зерновой терминальный комплекс "Тамань"»), which is a 50% stake, and Novorossiysk (Russian: «Новороссийский зерновой терминал»), which is a 100% stake and the largest grain terminal in Russia, a stake of 50% minus 1 share in the United Grain Company (UGC) or (OZK) (Russian: «Объединенной зерновой компании» («ОЗК»)), and 100% ownership of the railway operators Rusagrotrans (Russian: «Русагротранс»), LP Trans (Russian: «ЛП Транс»), Cargo Company (Russian: «Грузовая компания») and TransLes (Russian: «ТрансЛес»). Demetra Trading LLC (Russian: ООО «Деметра Трейдинг»), which was established in 2014 in Krasnodor and is wholly owned by Demetra Holdings, is one of the top 3 largest grain exporters in Russia and supplies products to more than 30 countries around the world.)

As of August 2023, Vinokurov controls stakes in such companies as one of Russia's largest food retailer Magnit, in International Restaurants Brand LLC, which is developing KFC brand in Russia and Santinelle, leading Russia's producer of instant hand sanitisers.

== Civic activities ==
Vinokurov is a member of the supervisory board of the Russian Cycling Federation and Rugby Union of Russia, co-founder of Marathon-Tula Cycling Team whose cyclist Gulnaz Khatuntseva and her Olympian teammate Maria Novolodskaya received a bronze medal for ROC in Women's Madison cycling on the velodome track at the 2020 Tokyo Olympics which was held on 6 August 2022.

Since 2021, he is a board member of Russian Union of Industrialists and Entrepreneurs (RSPP).

== Sanctions ==
Vinokurov was added to the EU Sanctions List on 9 March 2022 for providing a substantial source of revenue to the government of the Russian Federation.

He was sanctioned by the United Kingdom from 15 March 2022 in relation to Russia's actions in Ukraine.

== Family and personal life ==
Vinokurov is married to Ekaterina Vinokurova (née Lavrova) (born 1982 New York City), daughter of the Minister of Foreign Affairs of the Russian Federation Sergey Lavrov. She graduated from Manhattan's The Dwight School, majored in political science receiving a degree from Columbia University, and then studied for two years at the London School of Economics and received her master's in economics from there in 2006. After Russian special services noticed a $500 million contract on the internet for murdering both Alexander and Ekaterina Vinokurov addressed to Alexey Sherstobitov (Lesha the Soldat or Lesha the Soldier) in the fall of 2014, she and her husband moved to Moscow where she is the head of Christie's branch in Moscow. They have three children.

Vinokurov is fond of sports. He sponsored the Russian aquabike championship at 2019. Vinokurov's Marathon Group is also sponsor for FC Dynamo Moscow.
