= Alexander Ponomarenko =

Russian entrepreneur

- Александр Пономаренко
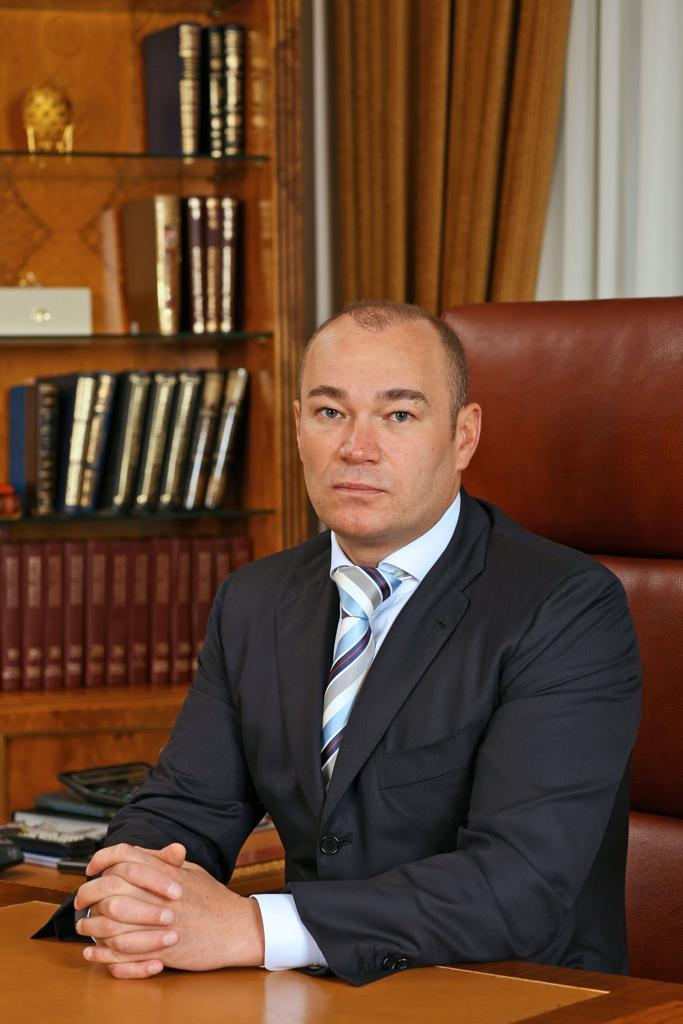
- Born: Alexander Anatolyevich Ponomarenko; 27 October 1964 (age 61); Bilohirsk, Soviet Union (now Ukraine)
- Citizenship: Russian and Cypriot
- Education: Simferopol State University; Russian State Academy of Management
- Occupation: Businessman
- Children: 3

Alexander Anatolyevich Ponomarenko (Russian: Александр Анатольевич Пономаренко; born 27 October 1964) is a Russian–Cypriot billionaire businessman who made his fortune in banking, sea ports, commercial real estate and airport construction.

== Early life ==
Alexander Ponomarenko was born 27 October 1964 in Crimea, Belogorsk City, Soviet Ukraine. He earned a bachelor's degree from Simferopol State University, followed by a master's from Russian State Academy of Management.

From 1983 to 1985, Ponomarenko served in airborne divisions of the armed forces. By the end of the 1980s, he was the junior boxing champion of Ukraine.

== Career ==
Ponomarenko has worked for much of his career with fellow billionaire Aleksandr Skorobogatko. In the late 1980s, the duo founded an enterprise in the Crimea that specialised in perfume products and building materials.

The two later moved to Moscow and founded the Russian General Bank in 1996. In 2006, according to Vedomosti, the bank was sold to Hungarian OTP Bank for $477 million.

Following the financial crisis in 1998, they started buying up shares in cargo companies that eventually combined to form Novorossiysk Commercial Sea Port (NCSP), which became the largest seaport in Russia.

In 2004, Ponomarenko was appointed the Chairman of NCSP. In 2007, NCSP had its initial public offering, listing 19.3% of total equity on the London Stock Exchange for US$955 million. At the beginning of 2011, the majority stake of NCSP was sold to Summa Capital and Transneft for US$2.5 billion.

In 2011, Alexander Ponomarenko business structures bought Putin's palace near Gelendzhik which is a palace in Praskoveevka and uses the rare domain "llcinvest.ru" which is also used by Putin's megayacht Shellest (Russian: «катер «Шелест») which is a small amphibious hovercraft with call sign UBAO8 that is often anchored in Sochi in early September and is owned by NP "the Revival of Maritime Traditions" (Russian: НП «Возрождение морских традиций»). (Note: The owners of NP "Revival of Maritime Traditions" (Russian: НП «Возрождение морских традиций») are Dmitry Mansurov, who is close to Putin's friend Yuri Kovalchuk, and Pavel Zaitsev, associated with another friend of Putin, Gennady Timchenko, and with the president's matchmaker Nikolai Shamalov who is also the former owner of the "Putin's palace" in Praskoveevka. This partnership is led by Denis Razgulyaev, who previously represented the business interests of persons associated with Putin's dacha cooperative Ozero. The NP "Revival of Maritime Traditions" has an e-mail address on the rare domain - "llcinvest.ru.") In 2016, allegedly Ponomarenko was no longer involved in Putin's Palace.

The trust acting in the interests of the families of Ponomarenko and Skorobogatko invested a significant part of the funds from the sale of NCSP to form the TPS Real Estate company to invest in the construction and operation of shopping and entertainment complexes. In 2013, the above trust acting in the interests of the families of Ponomarenko and Skorobogatko established TPS Avia Holding to invest in infrastructure development at Moscow's Sheremetyevo International Airport. In 2013, the company won a bid to develop a new cargo terminal at the airport. Ponomarenko joined the Board of Directors of JSC Sheremetyevo International Airport in 2015 and was elected its chairman in 2016.

In 2016, TPS Avia secured 68% stake in Sheremetyevo Airport and committed to investing US$840 million to upgrade and expand the airport's infrastructure.

In September 2021, Alexander Ponomarenko for the third time in a row was named to Kommersant's list of the top business leaders in Russia. He is among 47 business leaders within a list of the country's top 1,000 managers chosen by a committee of experts from the Russian Managers Association. Ponomarenko previously made the list in 2019. He ranked 31st on the Forbes list of "200 Richest Businessmen in Russia" in 2020.

=== Sanctions ===
He was sanctioned by the UK government in 2022 in relation to the Russo-Ukrainian War.

On 28 February 2022, in relation to the 2022 Russian invasion of Ukraine, the European Union blacklisted Ponomarenko and had all his assets frozen.

== Net worth ==
In August 2022, Forbes estimated Ponomarenko's net worth at $3.3 billion.

== Personal life ==
Ponomarenko is married, with three children and lives in Moscow.

In 2011, Ponomarenko purchased a "palace allegedly constructed for the private benefit of Russian president Vladimir Putin", now known as Putin's Palace. At the time of the purchase, Ponomarenko indicated that he had purchased the palace as an investment and planned to finish building the palace as a hotel complex. He said he bought it for a low price because of the scandal surrounding it and that the value of the complex could rise to as much as $350 million when the project was complete. Ponomarenko's media representatives told Forbes in 2021 that Ponomarenko had withdrawn from the project in 2016.

In 2017, it was reported in The Guardian that Ponomarenko had acquired Cypriot citizenship in 2016 through a "golden visa" scheme.
