= Aleksandr Skorobogatko =

Ukrainian-Russian billionaire

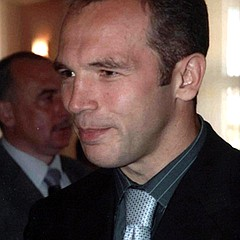
- Born: 15 September 1967 (age 58); Horlivka, Ukraine, USSR
- Education: Slavyansk State Pedagogical Institute; Plekhanov Russian Academy; Saint Petersburg Academy of Sciences
- Occupations: Businessman and former politician
- Children: 3

Aleksandr Ivanovich Skorobogatko (Russian: Александр Иванович Скоробогатько) (born 15 September 1967) is a Ukrainian-Russian billionaire businessman and former deputy member in the State Duma, having represented the Liberal Democratic Party of Russia (2003-2007) and United Russia (2007-2016). He has previously served as the Deputy Chairman of the Committee on Civil, Criminal, Arbitral and Procedural Law. As of 26 July 2022, his net worth is estimated at $ 2.8 billion.

== Early life ==
Skorobogatko was born in Horlivka, Ukraine, Soviet Union in 1967 to a mining family. He graduated from the Slavyansk State Pedagogical Institute in 1994 with a degree in physical education, and then earned a master's degree in finance from Plekhanov Russian Academy in 1996. He was later awarded a degree in Law from the Saint Petersburg Academy of Sciences of the Russian Ministry of the Interior.

== Business career ==
Skorobogatko, together with his partner Alexander Ponomarenko, launched a perfume manufacturing company and construction material business in the Crimea in the late 1980s.

In 1996, he and Ponomarenko founded the Russian General Bank in Moscow. The bank survived the 1998 crisis and was ranked as a "top 100 bank" in Russia by Interfax. In 2006, the bank was sold to Hungarian OTP Bank for $477 million according to Vedomosti.

Starting in 1998, the partners began to purchase shares in a number of stevedoring companies in the Tsemess Bay of Novorossiysk. In 2006 they were combined to form the Novorossiysk Commercial Sea Port (NCSP), which became the largest port in Russia. In 2007, NCSP went public and was listed on the London Stock Exchange.

In 2003, Skorobogatko was elected as a deputy member of the State Duma and stepped back from all private entrepreneurial activities.

In November 2017 an investigation conducted by the International Consortium of Investigative Journalism cited his name in the list of politicians named in "Paradise Papers" allegations.

Skorobogatko is one of many "Russian oligarchs" named in a report that was included in the Countering America's Adversaries Through Sanctions Act, CAATSA, signed into law by President Donald Trump in 2017. The report stated that the U.S. Department of the Treasury had compiled the list by enumerating individuals who, "according to reliable public sources," have an estimated net worth of $1 billion or more. The Department of the Treasury made clear that this was not a sanctions list, although some of the 210 individuals on the list were already subject to U.S. sanctions.

== Political career ==
In 2003, Skorobogatko was elected as a deputy member of the State Duma for the Liberal Democratic Party of Russia. In 2007, he joined the United Russia party. In November 2016, he announced his resignation, giving up his mandate before the end of his term.

== Awards ==
- Order of Friendship (2011)
- In April 2004, Patriarch Alexy II of Moscow and All Russia awarded Alexander Skorobogatko the Order of St. Sergius of Radonezh, 3rd class.

== Personal life ==
He is married, with three children, and lives in Moscow.

He is a candidate for the Master of sports in judo and sambo.
