= Dzhankhot =

Dzhankhot Джанхот
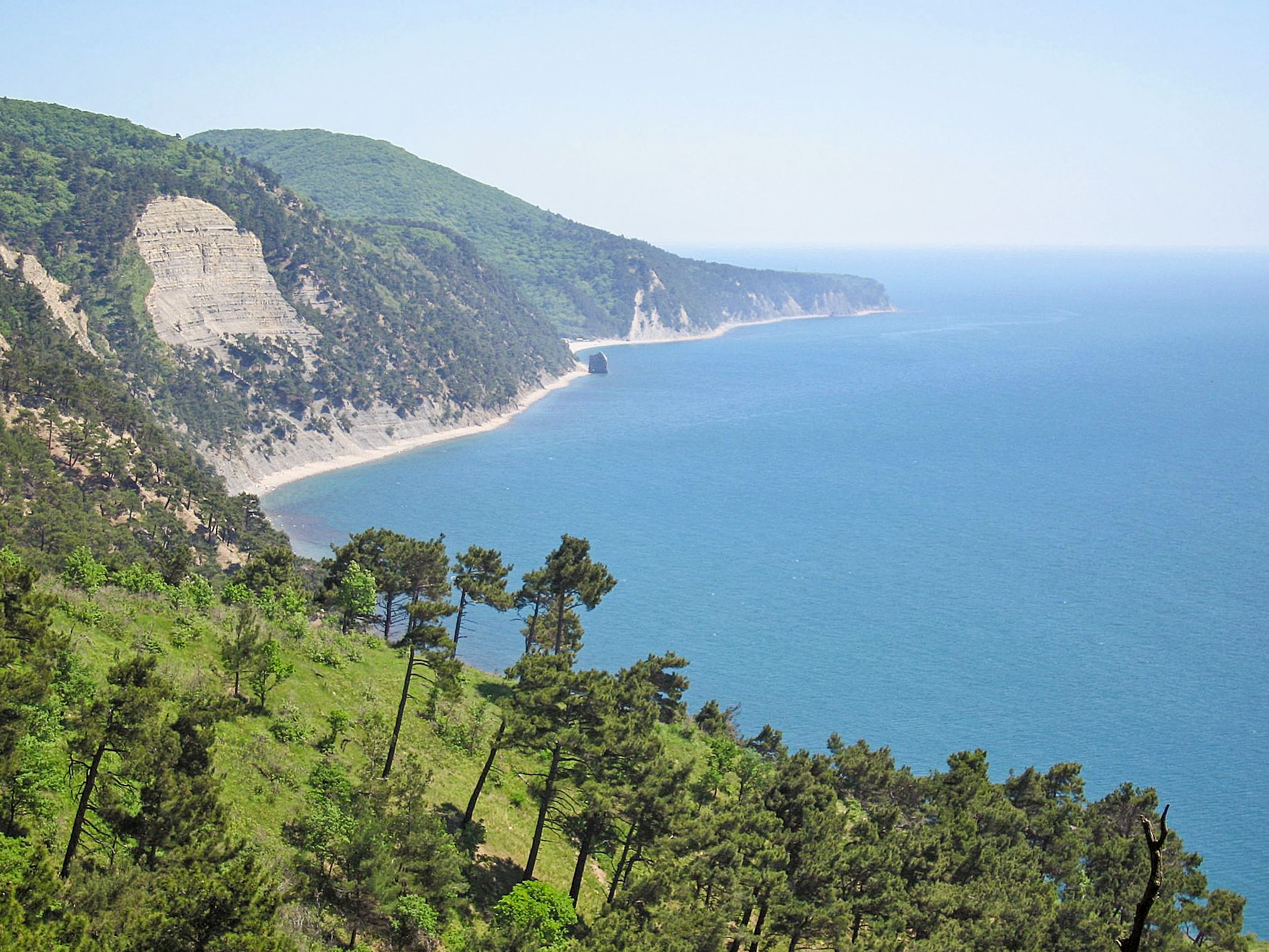
- Protected area - Grove of Pines Pitsunda (Dzhanhotsky Bor). In the distance - Sail Rock
- Interactive map of Dzhankhot
- Location of Dzhankhot
- Coordinates: 44°27′51.84″N 38°9′22.32″E
- Country: Russia
- Federal subject: Krasnodar Krai
- Founded: 1870
- Elevation: 12 m (39 ft)

Population
  - Estimate (2010): 416 )
- Time zone: UTC+3 (MSK)
- Postal code: 353491
- OKTMO ID: 03708000141

Dzhankhot is a khutor in Krasnodar Krai, Russia. It is part of the Divnomorskoye rural district, the municipal formation of the resort town of Gelendzhik.

The village's name, derived from the Adyghe language, translates to "wild dog".

== Geography ==
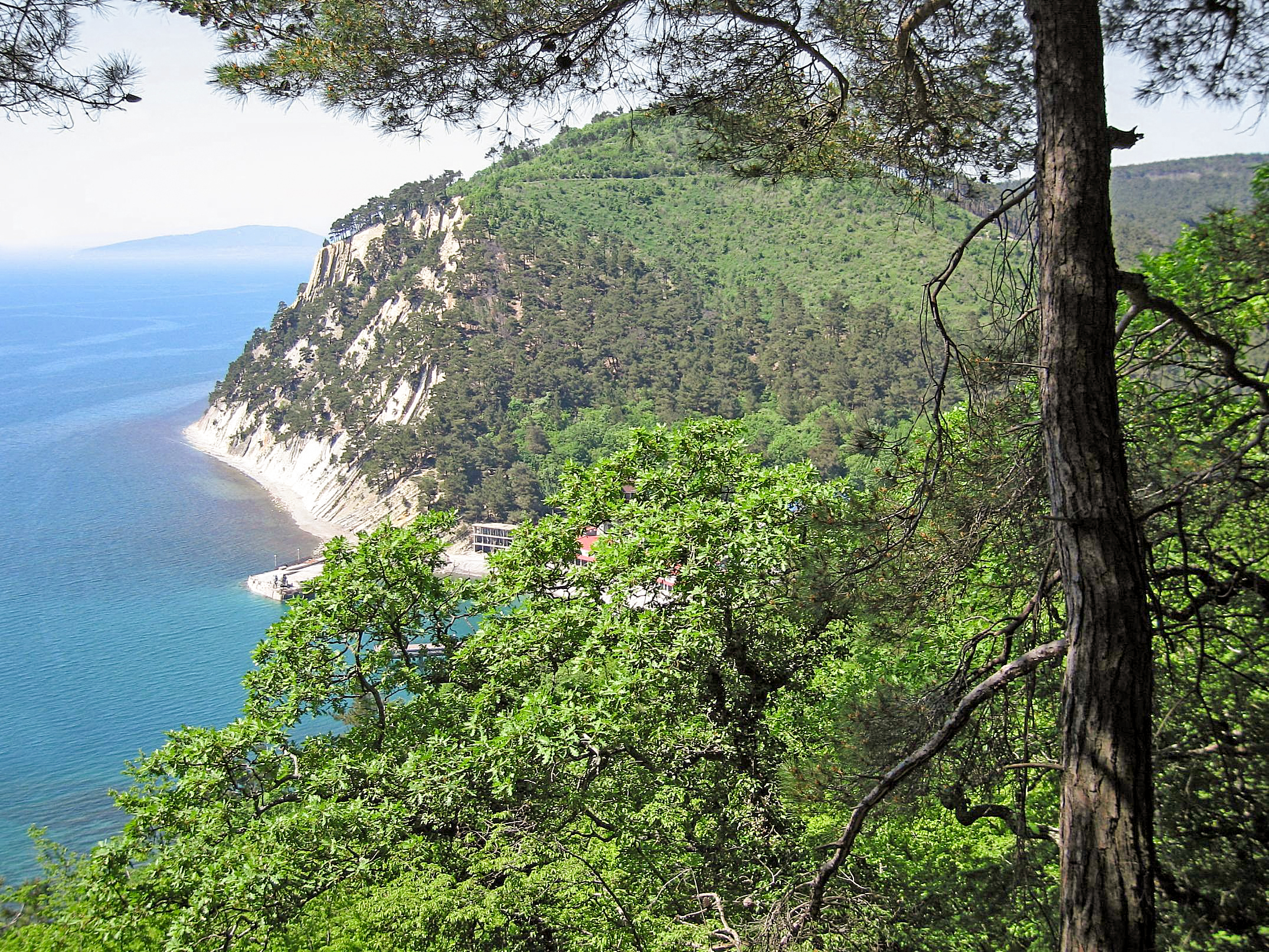
Pitsunda pine grove (Dzhankhotsky pine forest). View from Mount St. Nina

The farmstead is located on the Black Sea coast, at the mouth of the Khotetsai River (Adyghe: Kh'otekIey), along the valley of which the settlement stretches for 5 km. It is located 17 km southeast of Gelendzhik and 185 km southwest of the city of Krasnodar. It borders on the lands of the settlements: Divnomorskoye in the northwest and Praskoveyevka in the southeast. The average heights on the territory of the farm are about 194 meters above sea level and fluctuate from zero near the sea coast to 400 meters in the vicinity of the settlement.

A feature of the location is the location of the resort area in the landscape zone of distribution of the endemic Pitsunda pine - a relic of the Tertiary period. Currently, the ecosystem of the Dzhankhot area is subject to active anthropogenic impact, which is why measures are needed to preserve the unique natural features of Dzhankhot.

== Climate ==
The settlement has a moderate climate. The average annual precipitation is about 800 (mostly in winter). In February 2000, the city recorded a frost of -18.8 °C. For comparison, in Tuapse, which is more southern, but heavily ventilated due to the deep nearby gorge, the frost reached -21.8 °C.

== Places of interest ==
One of Dzhankhot’s most notable attractions is the dacha or summer estate of Ukrainian-born Russian writer Vladimir Korolenko. Nearby stands a 20-meter-tall Lebanese cedar, over 130 years old. About 5 km to the south lies Parus Rock, also known as Sail Rock—a sandstone formation rising from the sea. The area surrounding Dzhankhot is home to ancient Pitsunda pine forests. Two kilometers away, a picturesque landmark "Blue Abyss" (Голубая бездна), a coastal viewpoint known for its cliffs and deep blue waters.

== Gallery ==
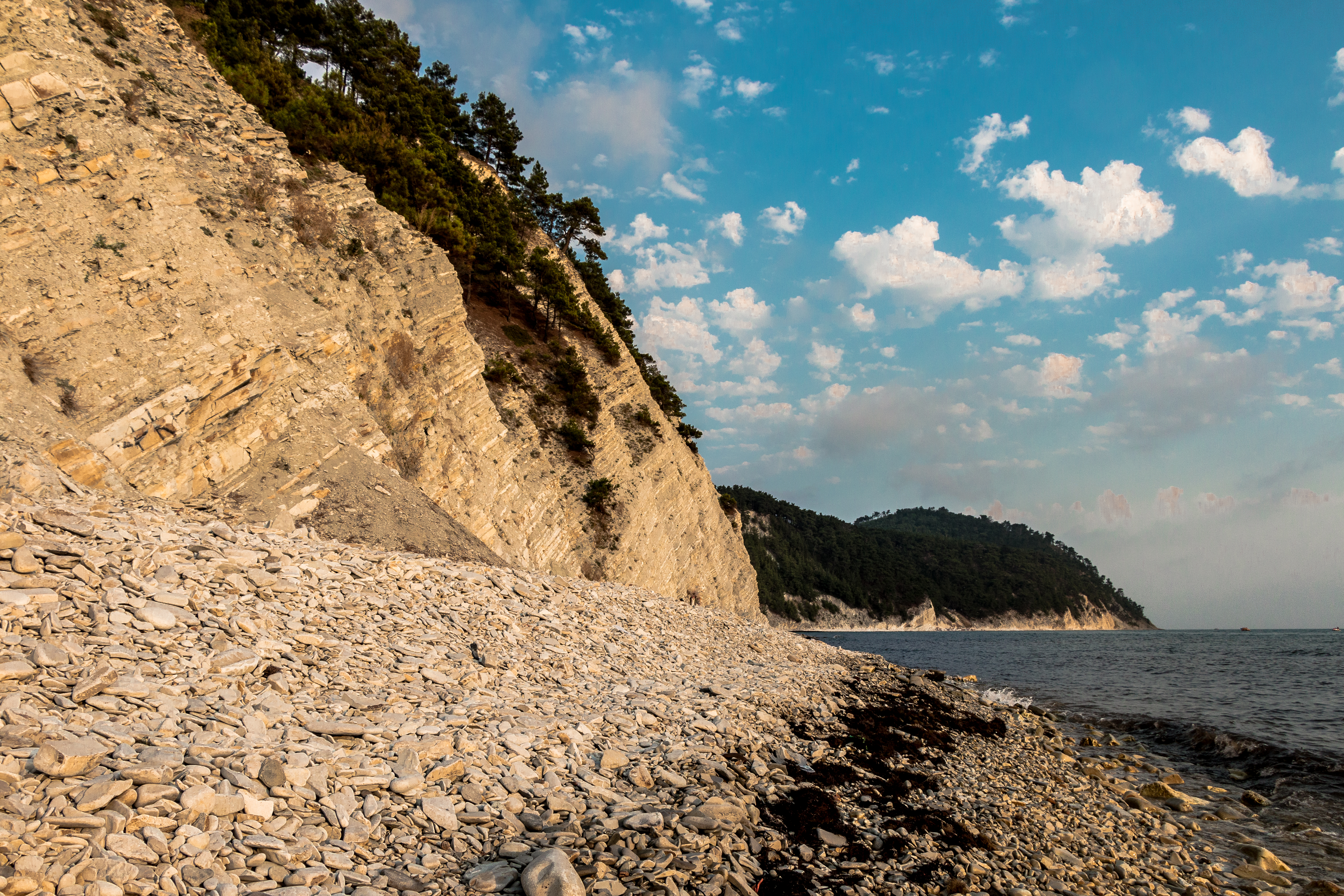
The coast near Dzhankhot

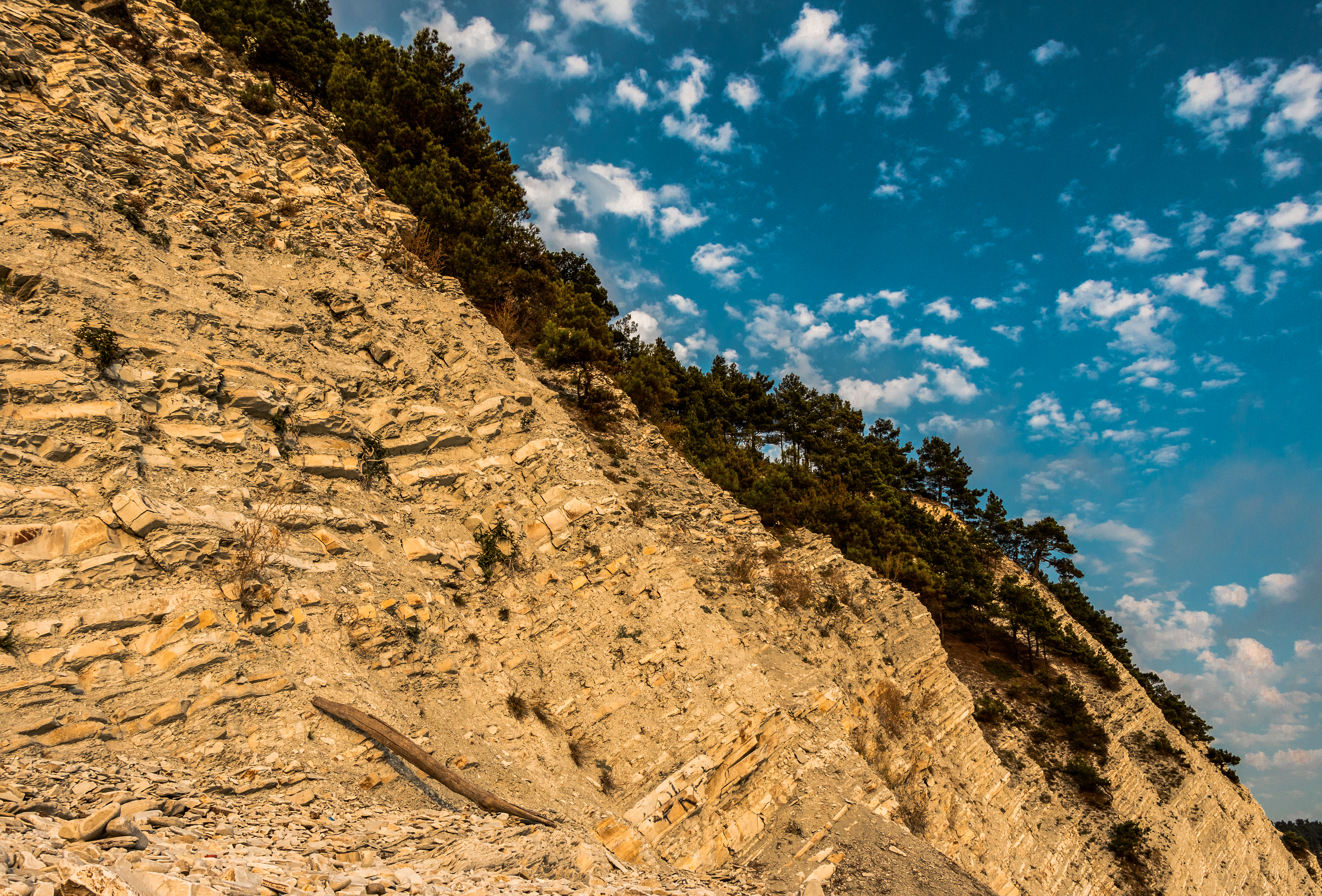
Mountain on the coast of Dzhankhot

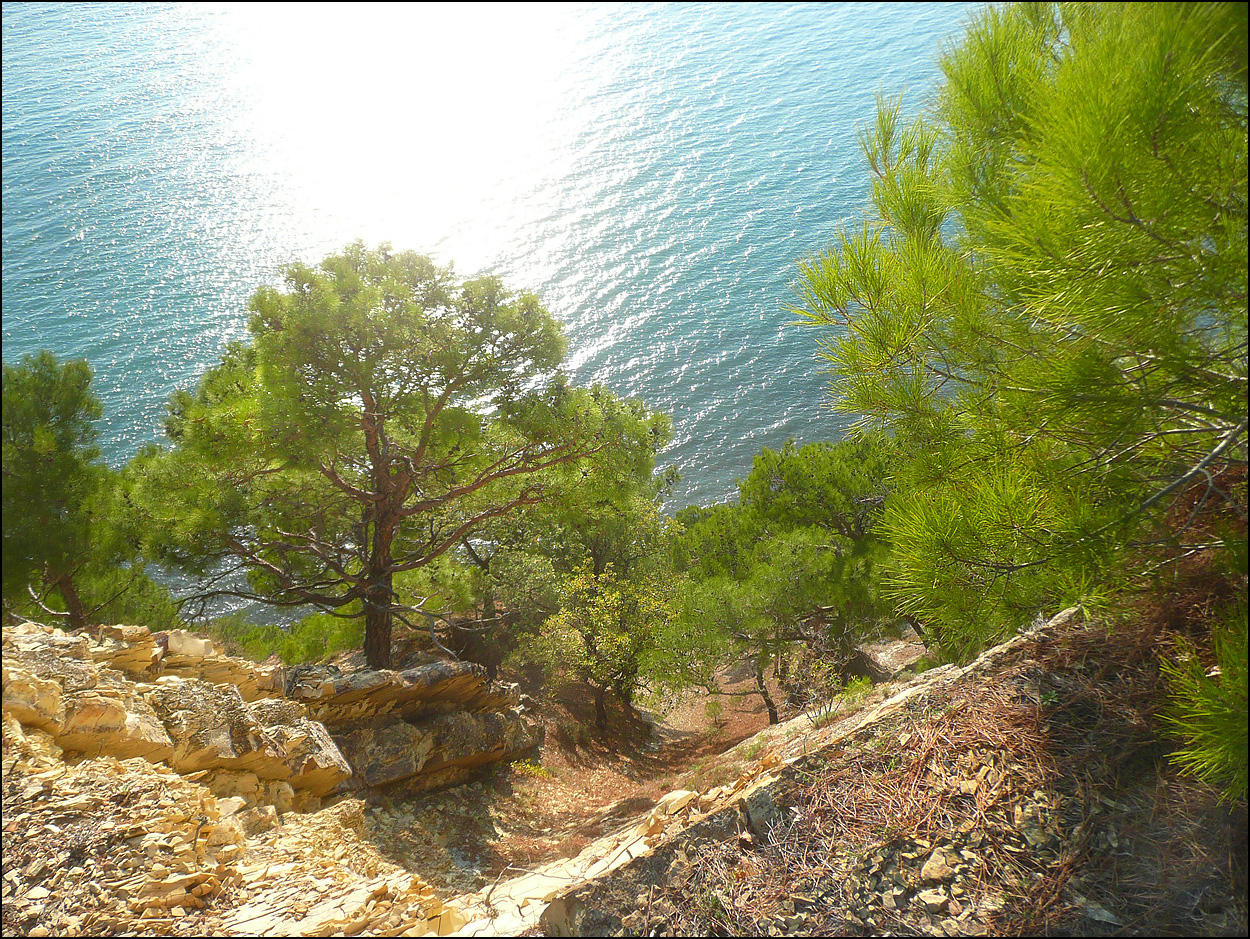
Pine Pitsundskaya on a steep slope by Dzhankhot

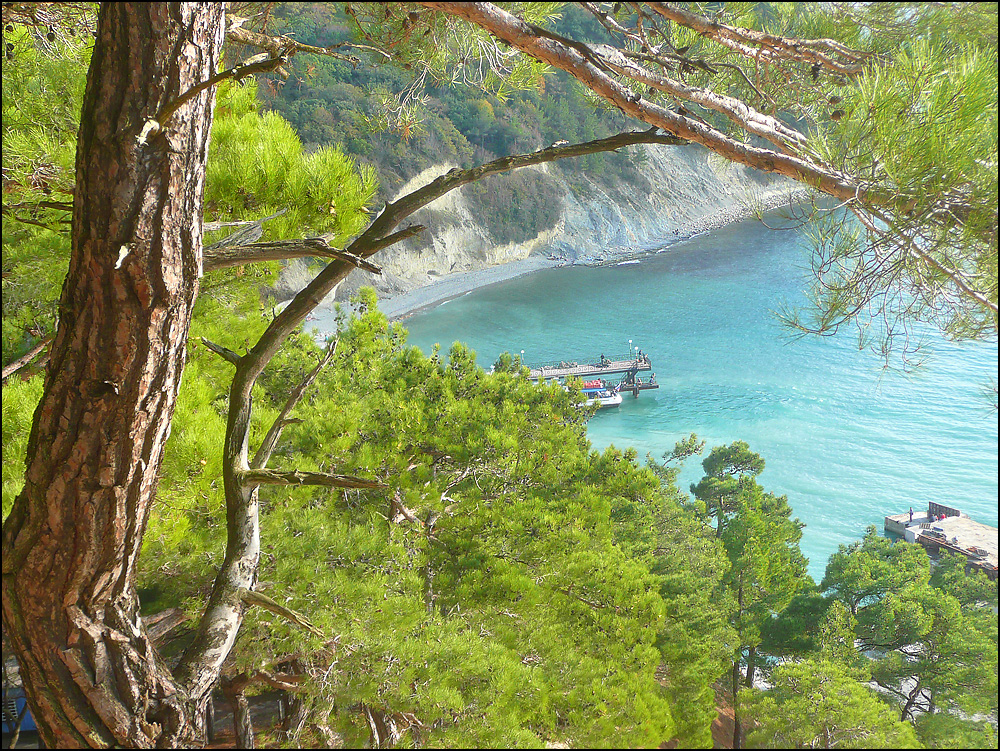
Little bay at the mouth of the Khotetsai River

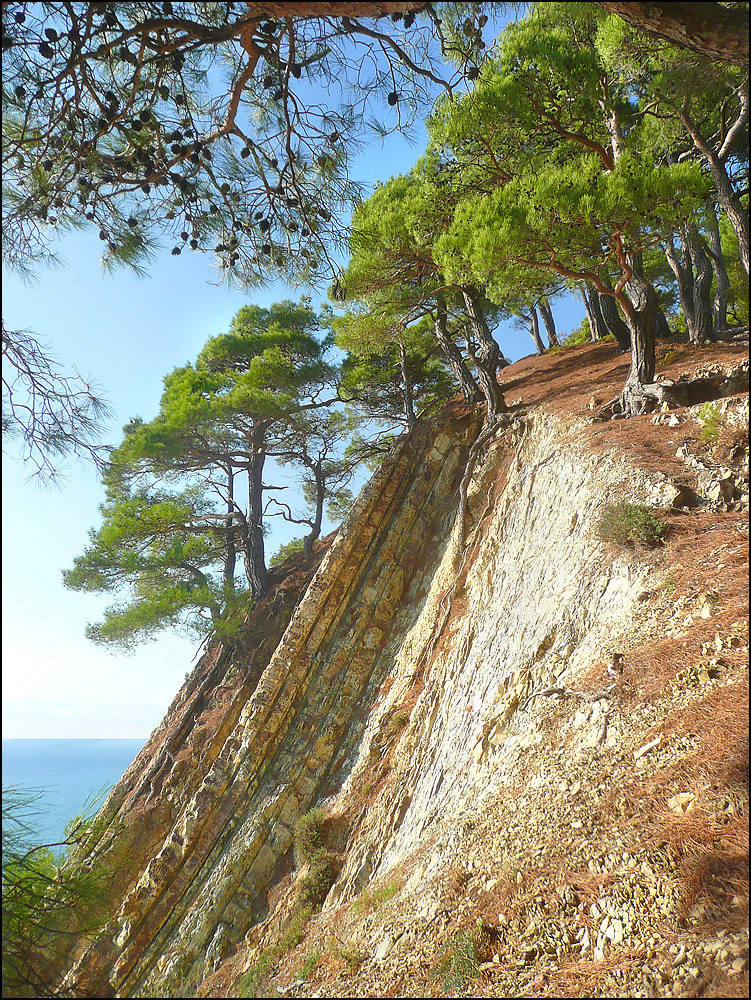
Pine Pitsunda on the slopes of the mountains by Dzhankhot

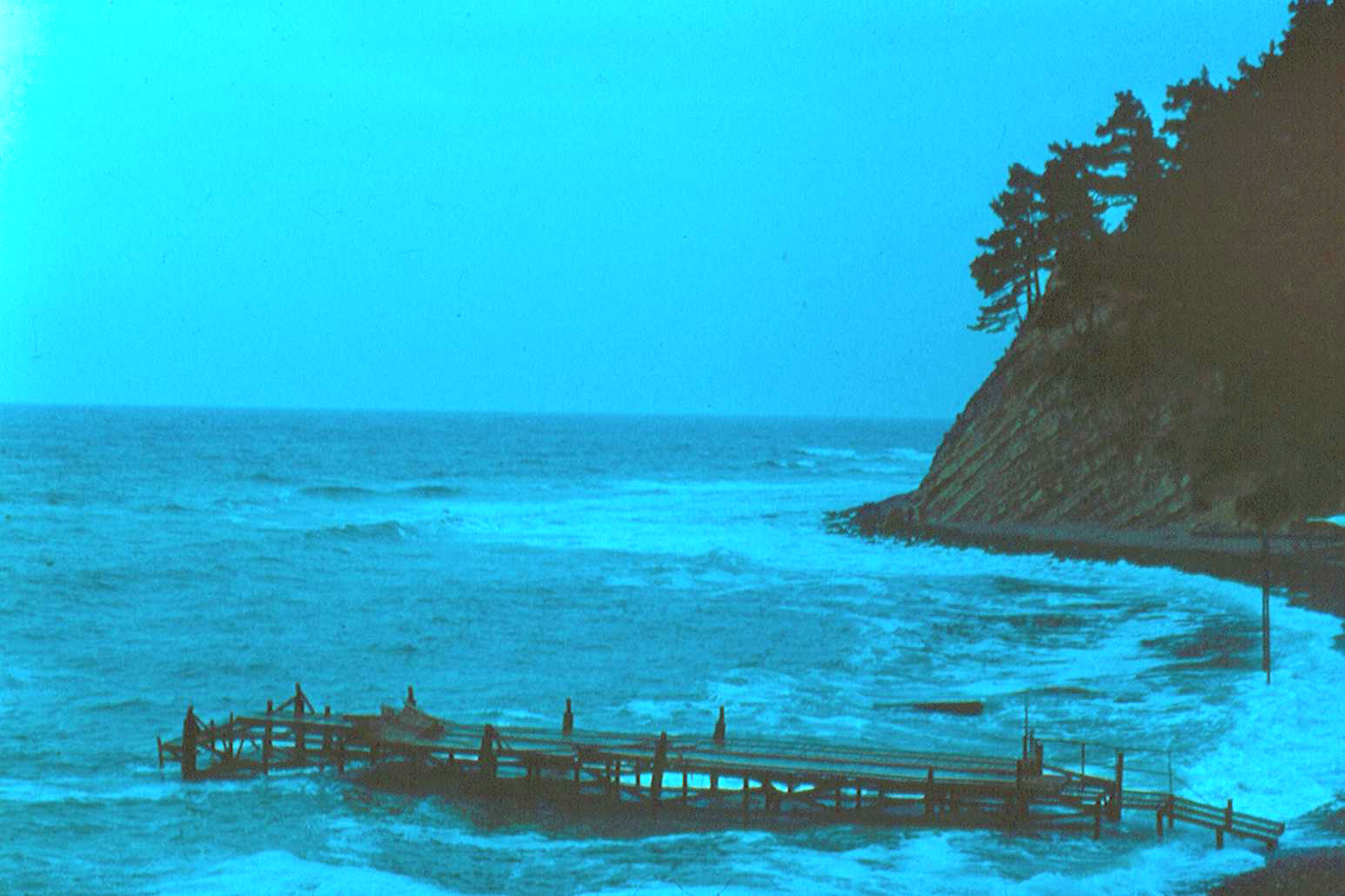
The coast of Dzhankhot

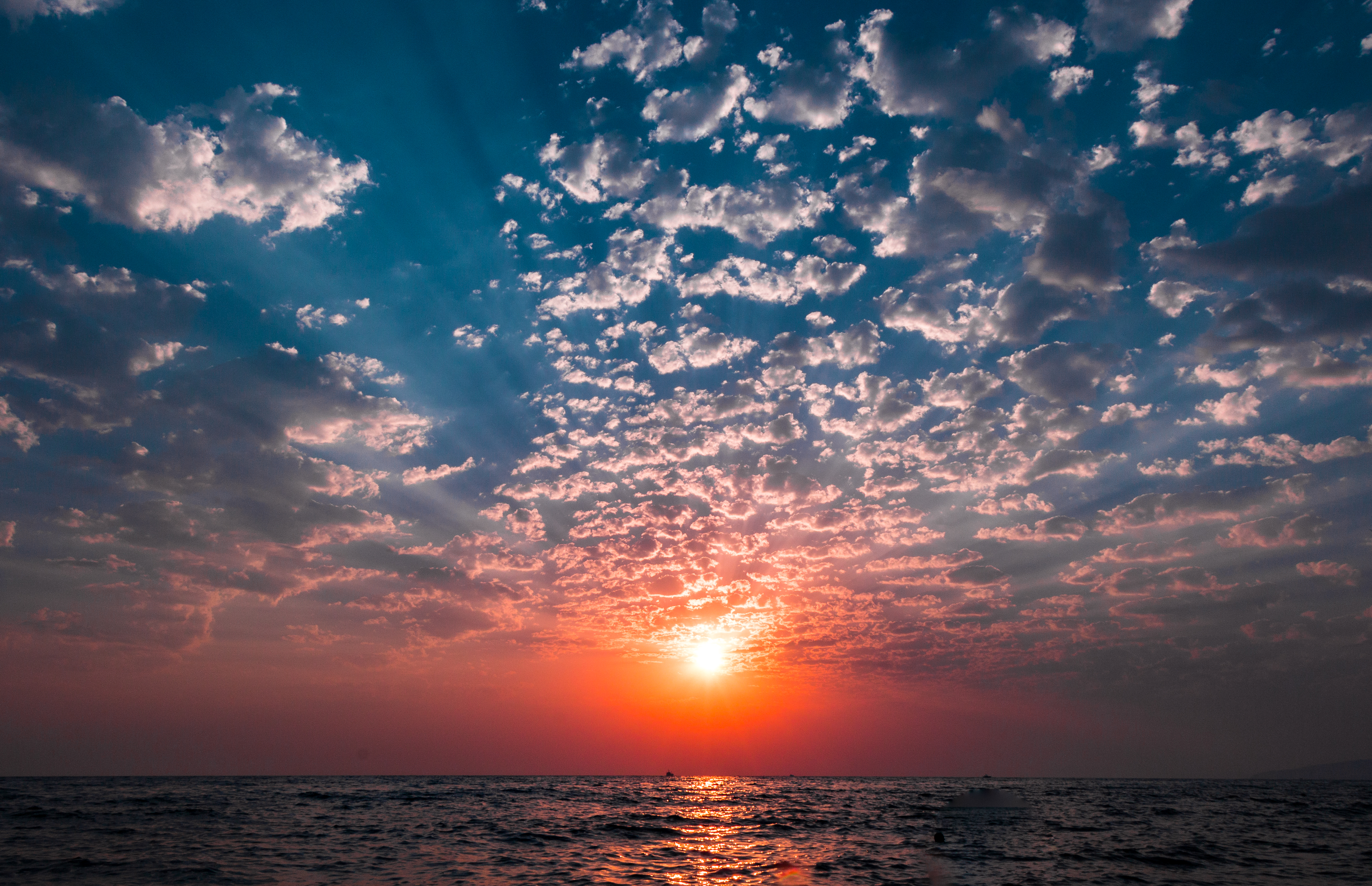
View from the beach in Dzhankhot

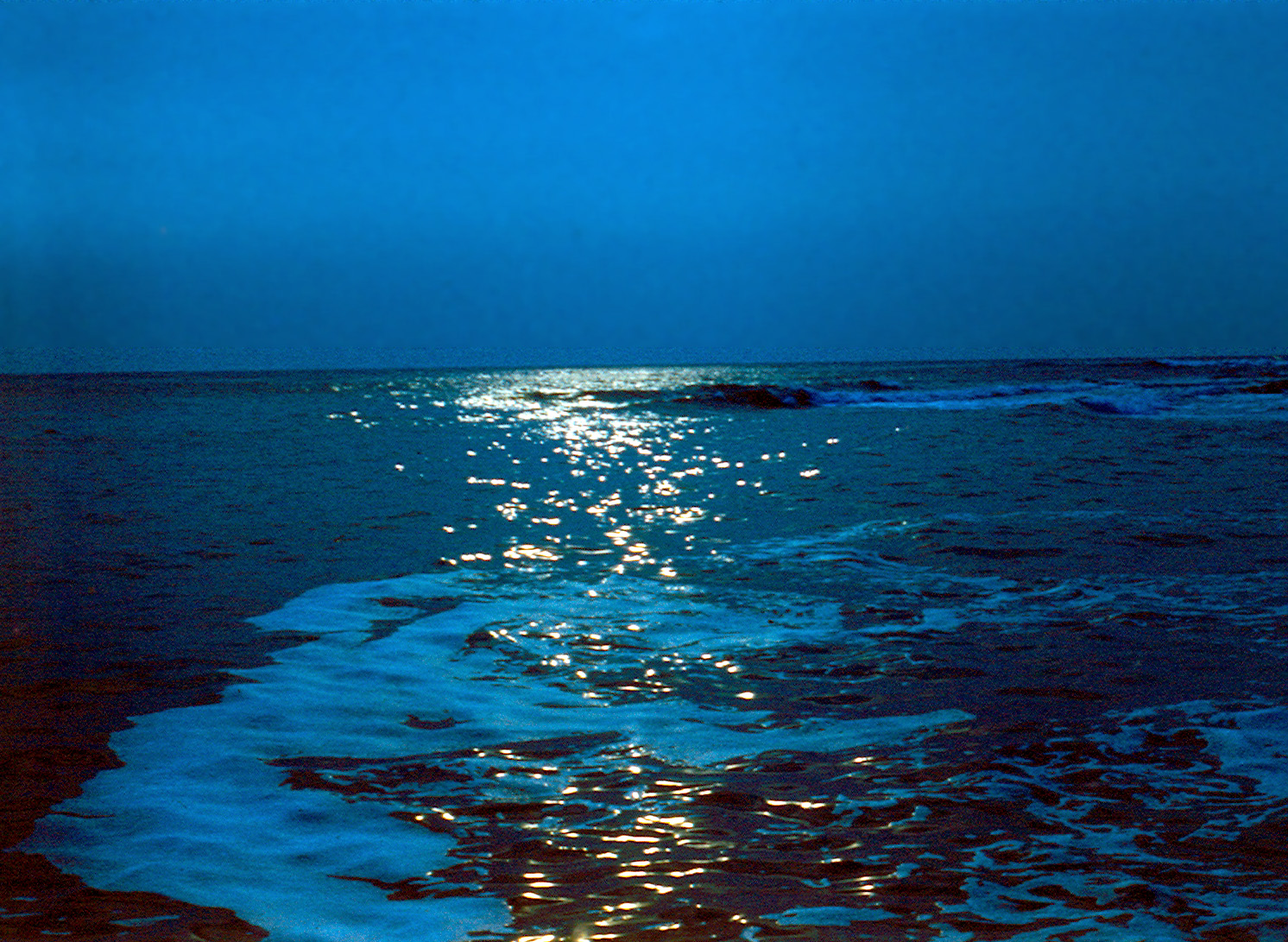
The night sea off the coast of the Dzhankhot

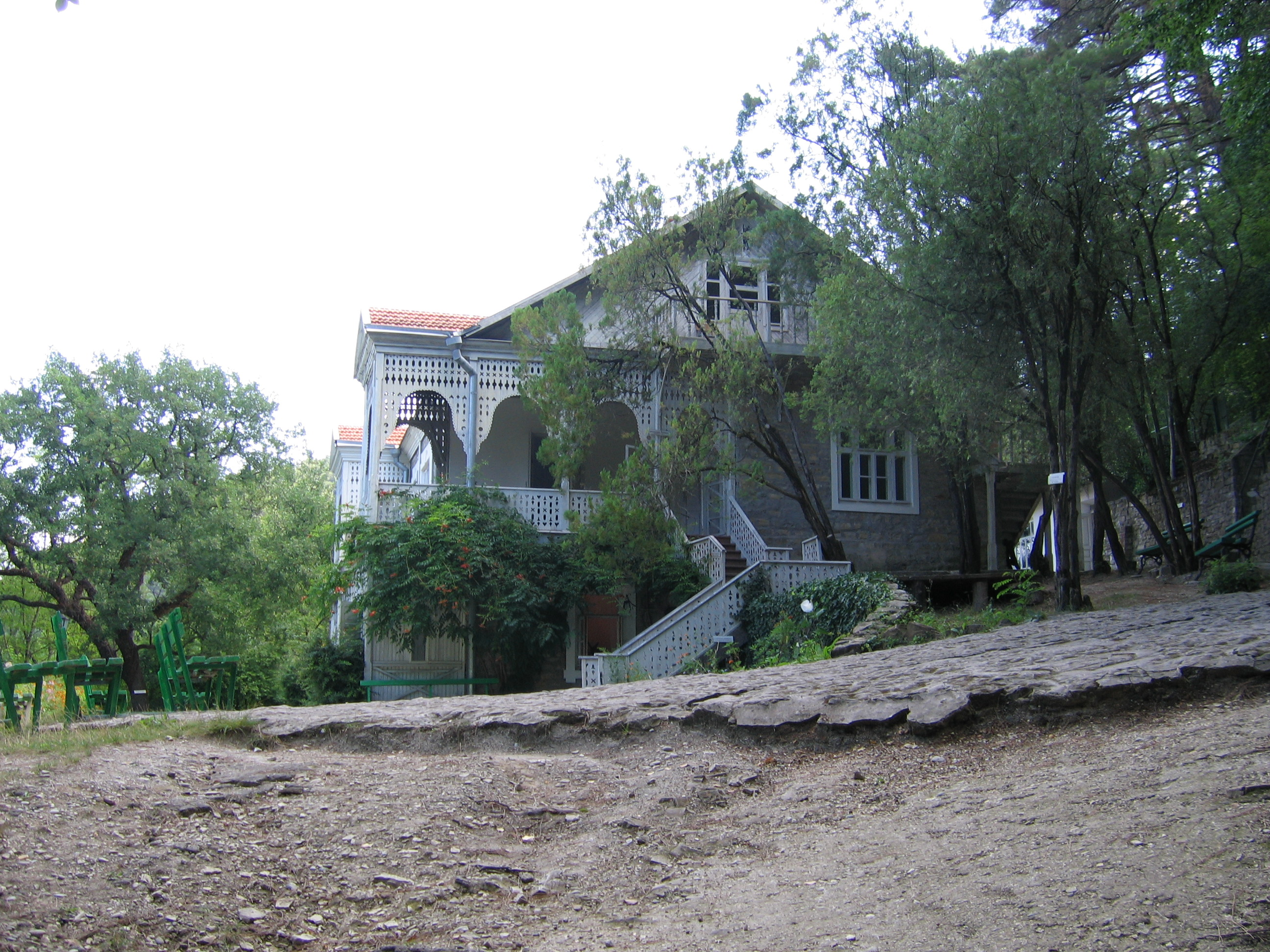
Dacha of Vladimir Galaktionovich Korolenko

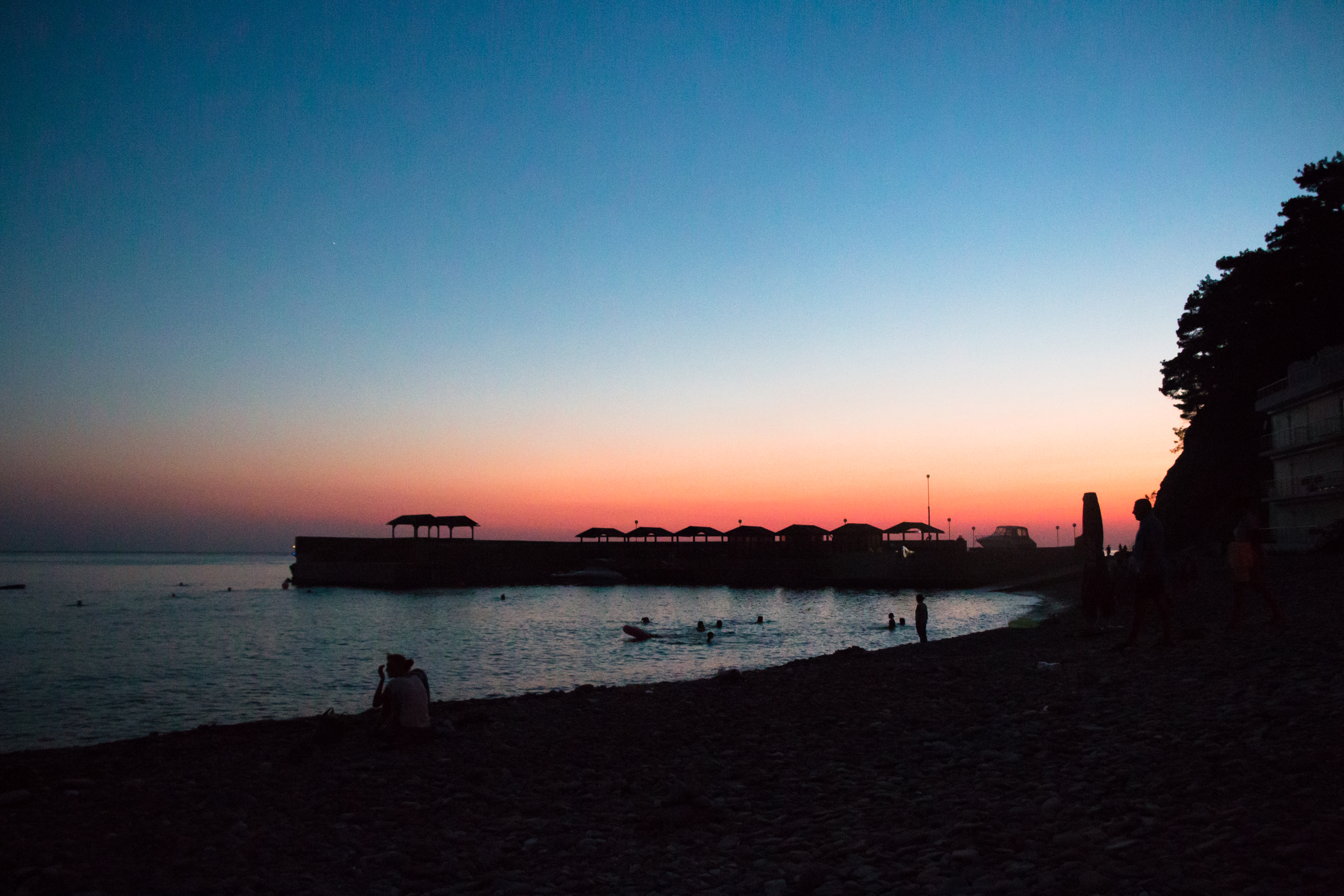
Beach and pier in Dzhankhot

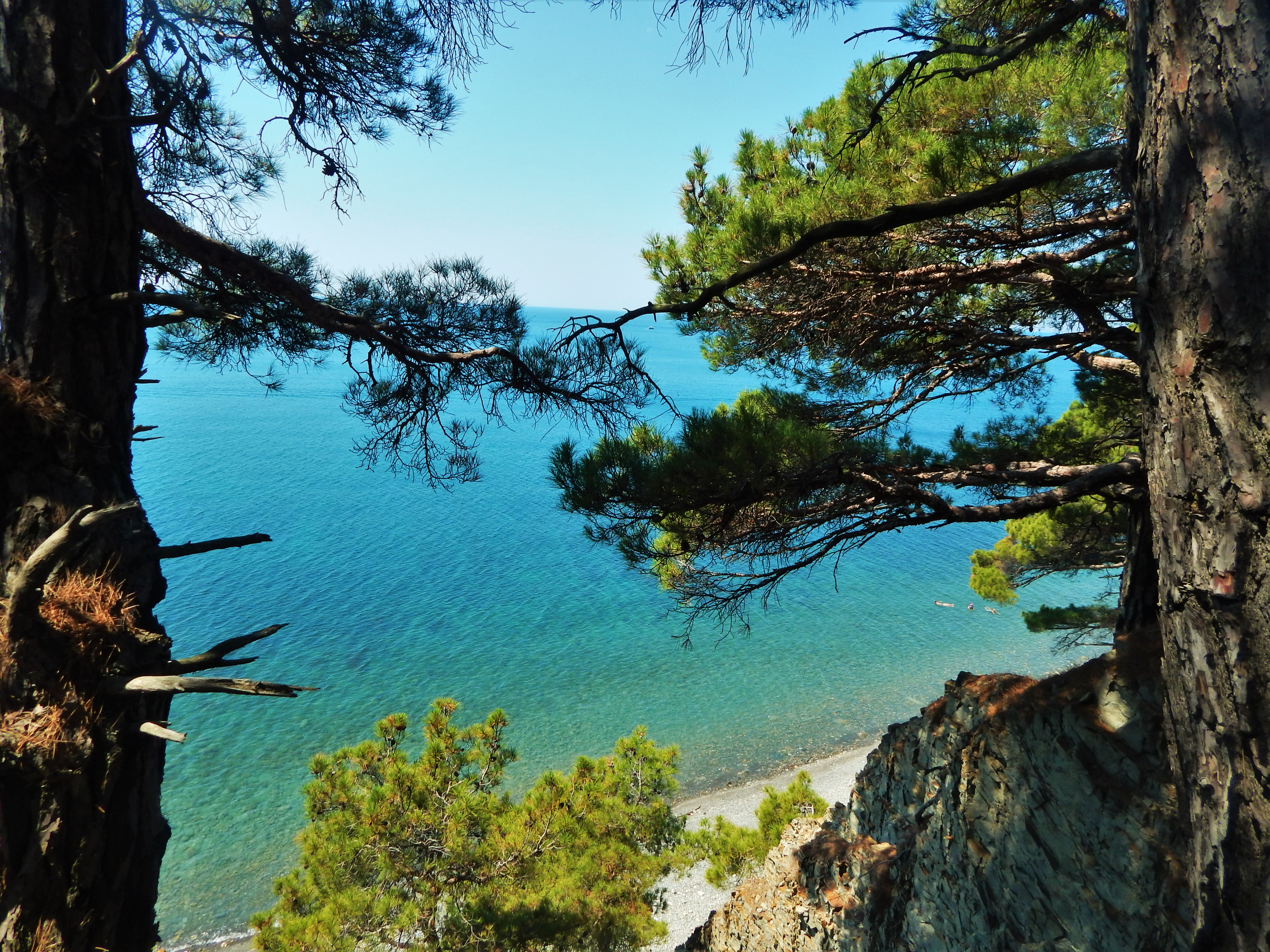
