= Melor Bedia =

Russian chess player

Personal information
- Born: September 26, 1979 (age 46)

Chess career
- Country: Russia
- Title: Grandmaster (2011)
- FIDE rating: 2407 (July 2026)
- Peak rating: 2512 (March 2011)

Melor Bedia (born September 26, 1979, Russia) is a Chess Champion from Russia. He owned the Grandmaster (GM) title in 2011. In 2016, he was the winner of the 11th Gelendzhik Chess Festival held in Gelendzhik, Russia.

== Notable tournaments ==
Tournament Name	Year	ELO	Points
Stanitsa Winter 2010 (Stanitsa-Luganskaya UKR)	2010	2489	7.0
Krasnodar Petrosian mem op (Krasnodar)	2004	2164	7.0
