= Divnomorskoye =

Divnomorskoe Дивноморское
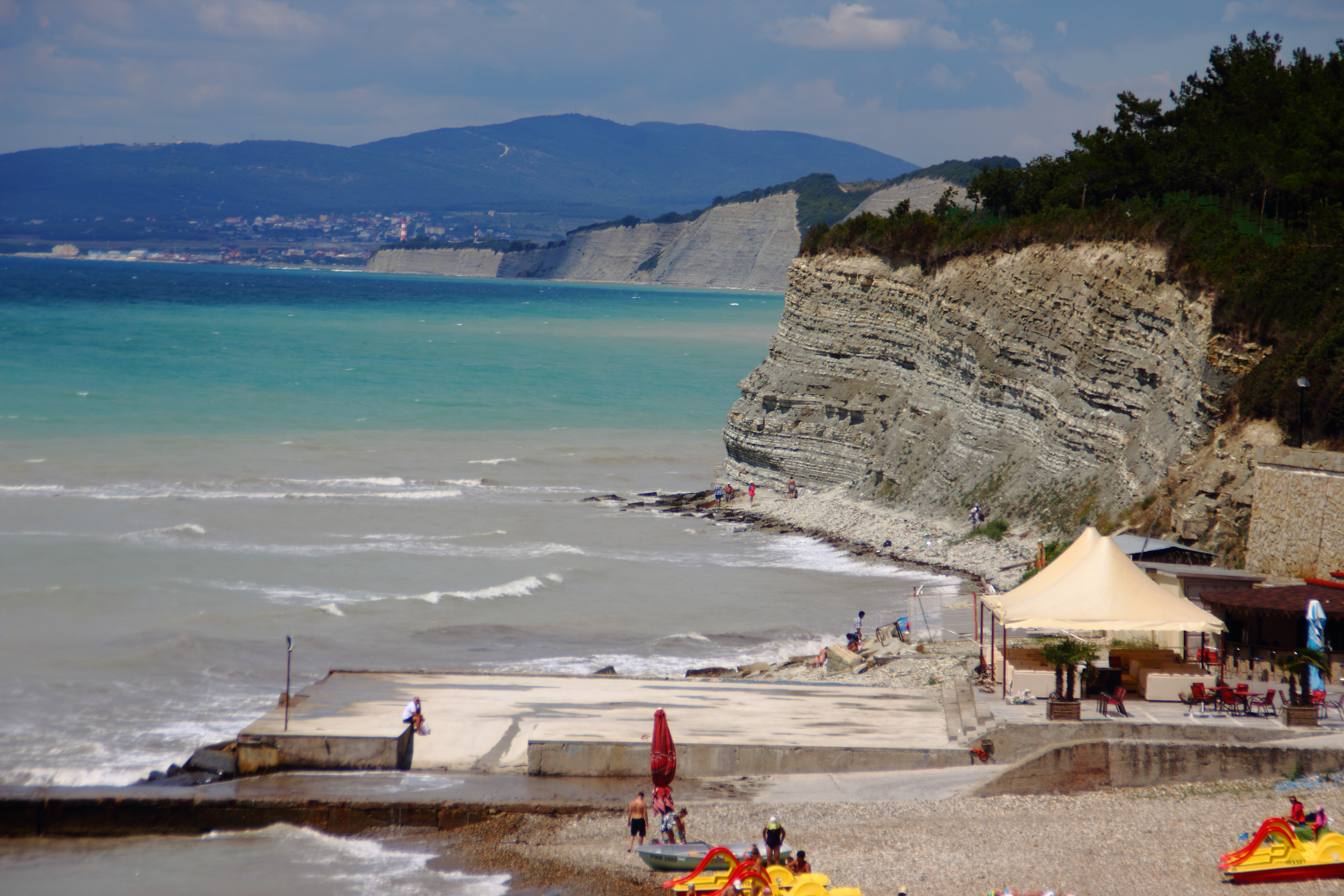
- Interactive map of Divnomorskoe
- Location of Divnomorskoe Divnomorskoe (European Russia) Divnomorskoe (Russia) Divnomorskoe (Black Sea)
- Coordinates: 44°18′N 38°42′E
- Country: Russia
- Federal subject: Krasnodar Krai
- Elevation: 8 m (26 ft)

Population
  - Estimate (2021): 6,813 )
- Time zone: UTC+3 (MSK)
- Postal code: 353490
- OKTMO ID: 03708000146

Divnomorskoe or Divnomorskoye (Russian: Дивноморское; until 1964 Falshivyj Gelendzhik, Russian: Фальшивый Геленджик) is a village in Krasnodar Krai, Russia. It is a part of the municipal formation Gelendzhik city-resort. It is the administrative centre of Divnomorskoye rural district.

== Geography ==
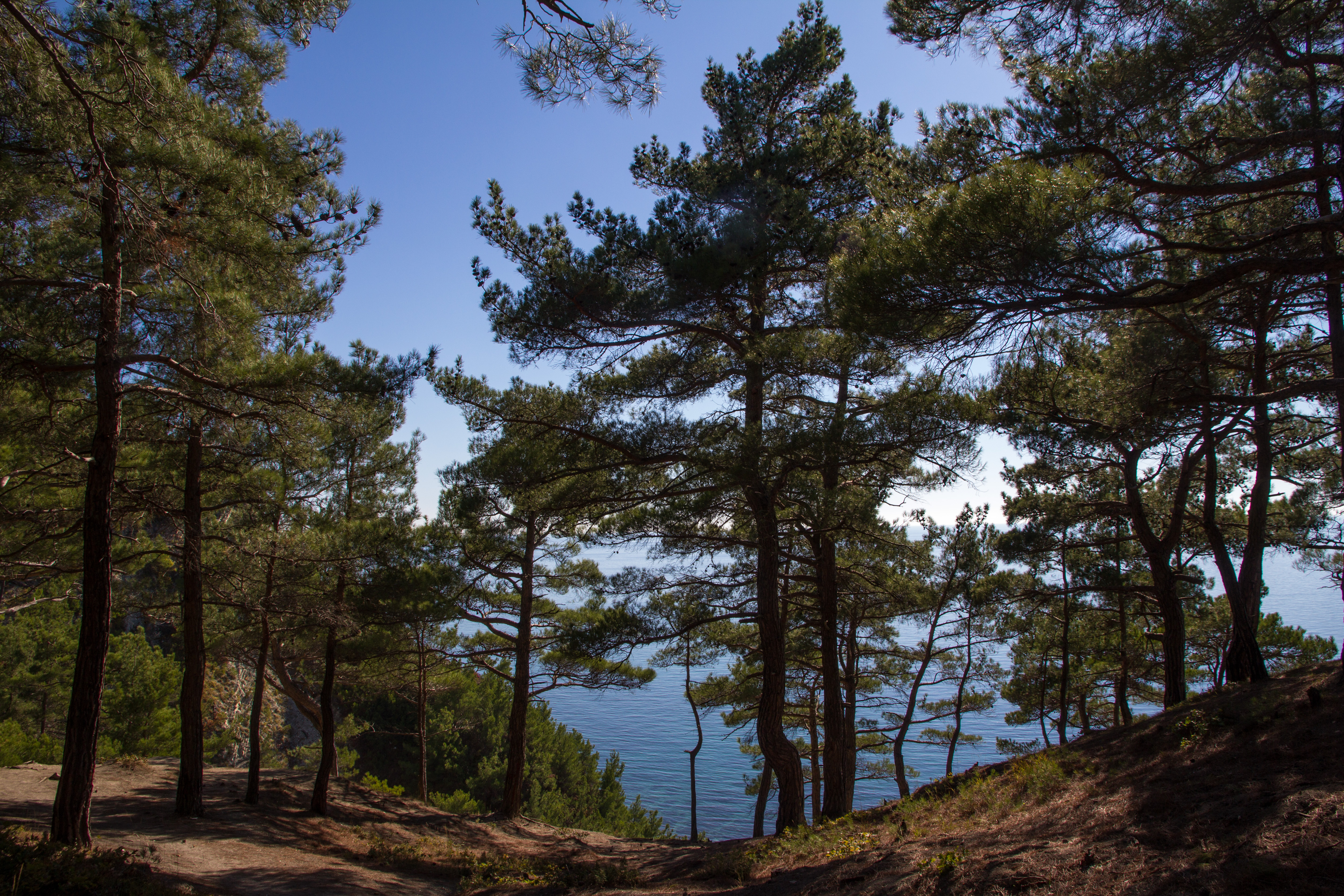
Relict pine forest near Divnomorskoe

The village is located near the Eastern Black Sea coast, at the mouth of the Mezyb (Inagua) River, which is formed by the confluence of the Mezyb and Aderbievka Rivers. Above the village in the Tserkovnaya gorge there is a water reservoir – ‘Lake Tserkovnoe’.

The settlement is part of the resort area of Greater Gelendzhik. Industrial production is practically absent, the main role in the economy is played by the tourist business. On the seashore there are holiday complexes, some of which are student resorts. Viticulture and horticulture are developed.

=== Climate ===
The climate in the village is mild, summer is arid. The average annual air temperature is +12.5 °C. The average monthly temperature of the warmest month (July) is about +23.0 °C, while the coldest month (January) is about +2.5 °C. The average annual precipitation is about 850 mm.

== History ==
Up to the middle of 19th century on the place of modern village there was Circassian aul Mezyb (Adyg. Mezyb – ‘many woods’).

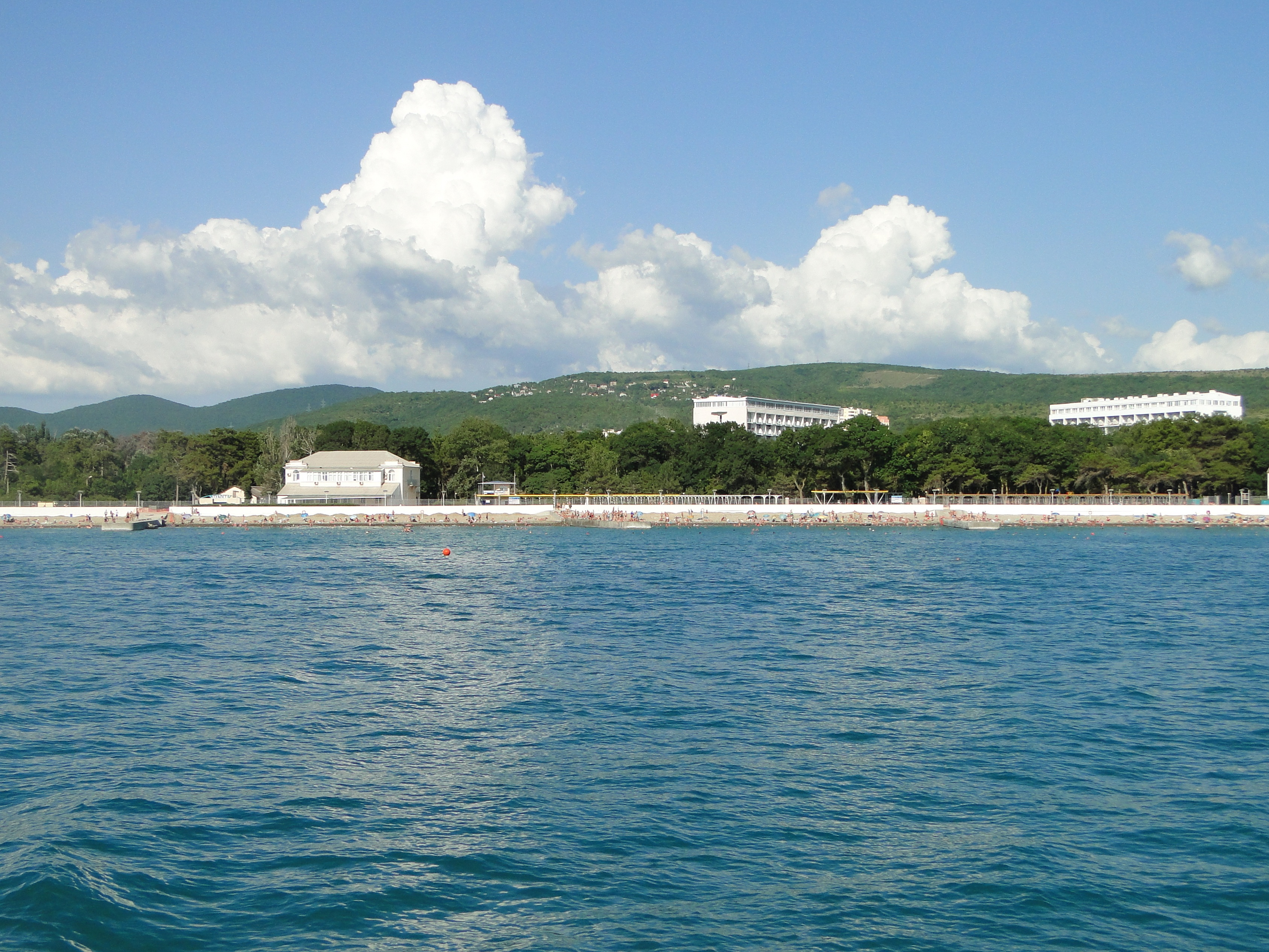
The beach of the sanatorium "Divnomorskoye"

Employees of a city museum in the Rostov regional archive have found the report of the chief of the Black Sea coastal line general N. N. Raevsky where already mentioned False Gelendzhik in connection with construction of fortification in Gelendzhik in 1831.

Historians believe that this name could have arisen in the 1830-40s, when the captains of ships in the dark, seeing the dim lights, took this small bay for Gelendzhik and mistakenly came here, dropping anchor. According to the 1926 census, it had a population of 301, 64.8% Ukrainian and 21.3% Russian.

The official name Falshivyj Gelendzhik (Фальшивый Геленджик, "Fake Gelendzhik") the settlement was more than 100 years and was renamed Divnomorskoye only in 1964. It was renamed at the request of the residents, a competition was announced for the best name for the village.

On 10 March 2004 during the transformation of municipal districts of Krasnodar Krai, the village Divnomorskoye was included in the Divnomorskoye rural district of the resort town of Gelendzhik.

== Vineyards ==
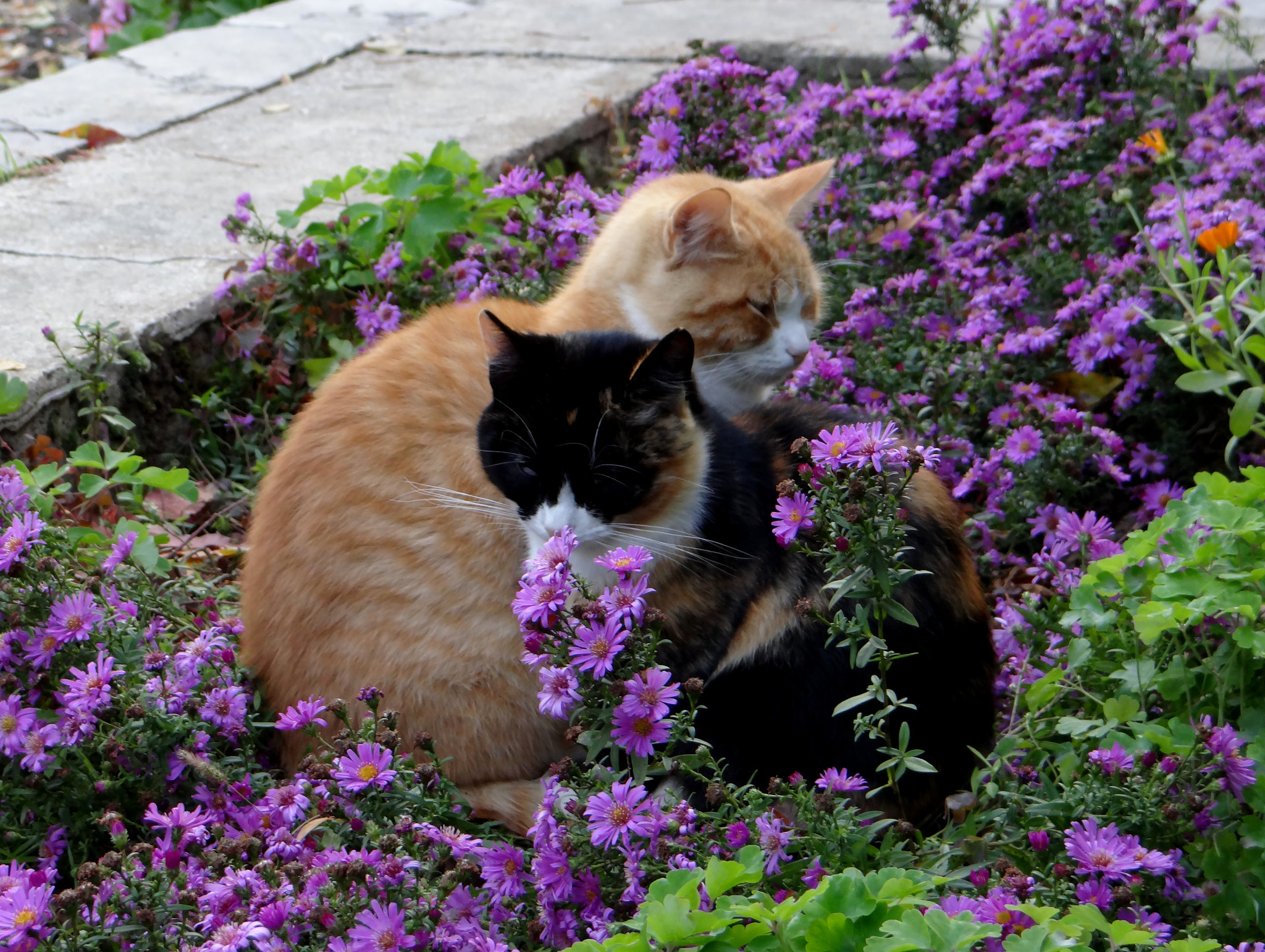
Animal residents of Divnomorskoe

Near Divnomorskoe are three notable vineyards: (Note: Nikolai Egorov formed the law firm Egorov Puginsky Afanasiev & Partners and is a very close friend of Vladimir Putin since both studied together at Leningrad State University and both graduating with degrees in Faculty of Law at the Leningrad State University (LSU) in 1975.)

- more than 70 hectares of vineyards associated with the Russian Orthodox Church (ROC) which are controlled through the 2015 registered OOO Mezyb (Russian: ООО «Мезыбь»)
- more tha 80 hectares of vineyards near Praskoveyevka founded by the Nikolai Egorov company "Axis Investments", which is also spelled "Aksis Investments", (Russian: компании Егорова «Аксис инвестиции»), which, since 2015, is owned by Alexey Tot (Russian: Алексей Тот), through its subsidiary the 2014 registered registered "Apex Yug" (Russian: «Апекс Юг»), which is part of LLCInvest, and produces the wine Krinitsa (Russian: «Криница»)
- the Lazurnaya Yagoda LLC owned and 2009 established Divnomorsky Estate winery (Russian: Усадьба Дивноморское), which uses the internet domain LLCInvest.ru and is in the Alexei Navalny associated 2021 documentary film Putin's Palace. History of World's Largest Bribe, is also called Usadba Divnomorskoe, produces wine known as "Putin's wine", which is closely associated with Putin's palace at Gelendzhik, was formerly owned by the Pavel and Boris Titov associated "Abrau-Durso" winery
