= Tabris (retail company) =

Russian supermarket chain

- Company type: Limited liability company
- Founded: 1998; 28 years ago
- Headquarters: Krasnodar region, Krasnodar, Russia
- Products: Food products, non-food products
- Owner: Vladislav Gennadievich Kuznetsov (director)
- Website: www.tabris.ru

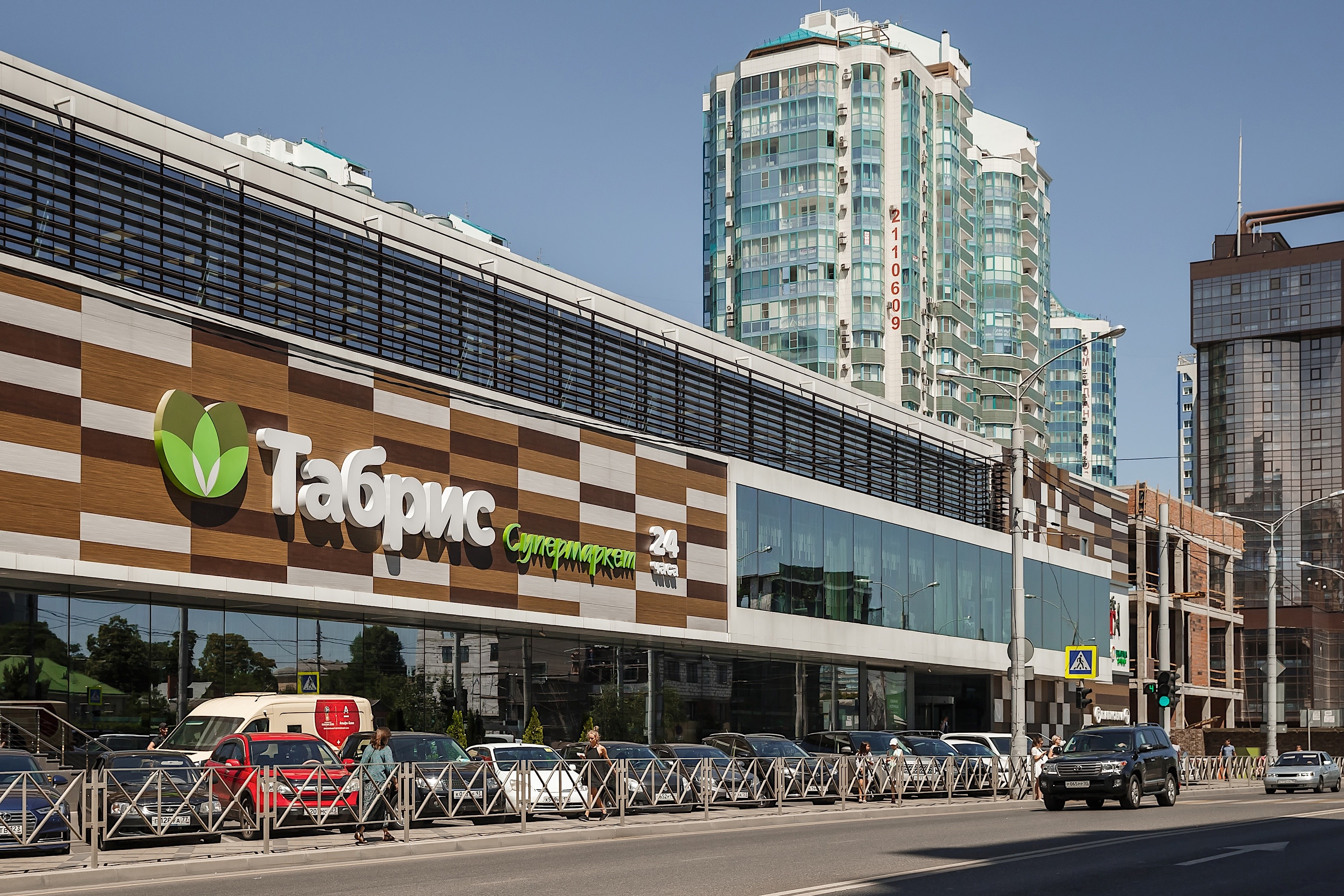
Supermarket retailers

Tabris (Russian: Табрис) is a Russian chain of supermarkets retailers with its head office in Krasnodar. The management company is LLC "TVK-R".

== History ==
The first store of the retail chain opened in Krasnodar on March 7, 1998, on street Krasnaya, 202.

In 2006, the Tabris Center began operating, on the territory of which there is a supermarket, perfume, cosmetics, stationery stores, as well as a pharmacy and a cafe.

In 2007, Tabris launched its own production with a finished goods workshop. Bread is baked there three times a day, as well as Caucasian lavash according to a family recipe of one of the founders, salads, classic dishes and Eastern cuisine dishes are prepared.

In 2008, a confectionery shop was opened in the Tabris chain. Cakes and other desserts are prepared there.

The first supermarket outside Krasnodar was opened in Novorossiysk on July 25, 2009, the second – in Gelendzhik on April 15, 2020.

In 2020, the retail chain has 13 supermarkets, six of which are Tabris centers.

In June 2021, the first supermarket opened in Sochi.

In April 2022, the Tabris Center opened in Anapa.

== Activity ==
=== Own production ===
Since 2007, the Tabris retail chain has launched its own production. Today, the following workshops are operating: confectionery, bread, salads and cooking, semi-finished meat products, and finished goods at stores.

The assortment of the retail chain includes dishes created in collaboration with brand chefs of Japanese and Italian cuisine, a nutritionist, as well as baked goods and street food based on recipes from famous chefs.

== Incidents ==
In 2006, the Prosecutor's Office of the Prikubansky District of Krasnodar opened a criminal case against the chief accountant of Tabris, who had embezzled about 2 million rubles through forged contracts.

On October 2, 2019, the Tabris store on 40 Let Pobedy street in Krasnodar caught fire. 90 people were evacuated.
