= Praskoveyevka =

Village in Krasnodar Krai, Russia

Coordinates: 44°27′10″N 38°12′44″E

Praskoveyevka Праскове́евка
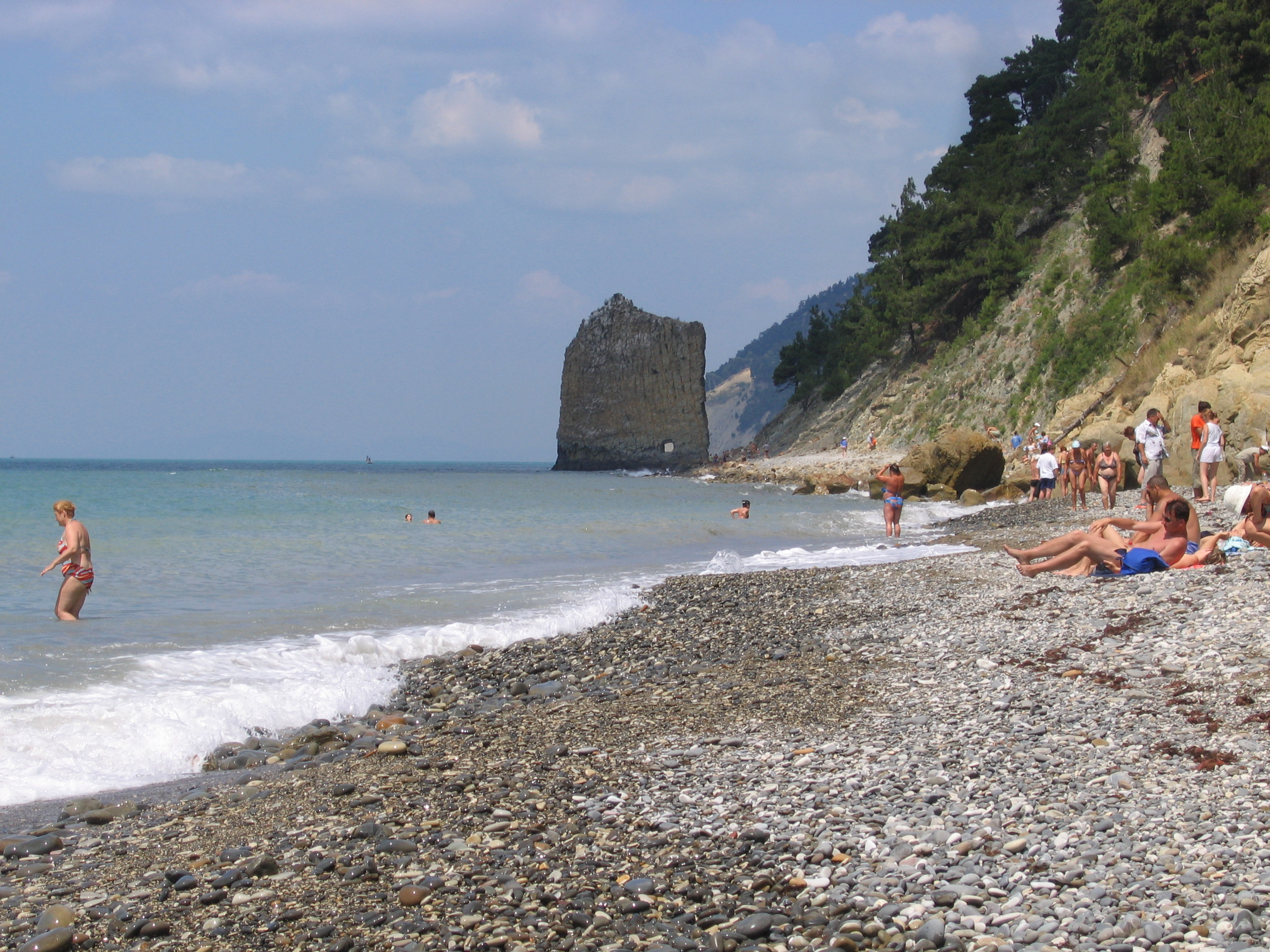
- Parus Rock (Sail Rock)

- Established: 1866

Population (2010)
  - Total: 269

Praskoveyevka or Praskoveevka (Russian: Праскове́евка) is a village near Gelendzhik in Krasnodar Krai, in the south of Russia. It is situated on the northeastern beach of the Black Sea, 17 km southeast of Gelendzhik and 89 km southwest of Krasnodar. It had 269 inhabitants as of 2010.

It is in the municipality Divnomorski.

== History ==
Before the completion of the Caucasian War, these areas were inhabited by the Adyghe, who were deported by the Tsarist government in 1864.

The modern settlement town of Praskoveyevka was founded from 1856-1866 by Pontic Greek settlers who fled from Turkey to Russia after Crimean war and the Russo-Turkish War (1877–1878).

According to local legends, the name of the village is connected to the fact that the first person to settle in these areas was a woman named Praskovya. Her farmstead was called Praskovyevo, and the settlement that later emerged on its site was named Praskoveyevka. Another version suggests that the village’s name originated from the day of Praskovya’s feast—marking the foundation of the settlement.

As of January 1, 1894, the village of Praskoveyevka was part of the Novorossiysk district.

In 1896, Praskoveyevka was granted the status of a village due to the construction of a stone church dedicated to the “Beheading of St. John the Baptist.” In 1905, the first church parish school was built in the village.

In 1917, the village of Praskoveyevka was recorded as part of the Novorossiysk district of the Black Sea province.

On May 11, 1920, the Kuban-Black Sea Revolutionary Committee issued a decree transferring the village of Praskoveyevka to the Gelendzhik volost of the Black Sea district.

According to a decree on January 26, 1923, the village became part of the Gelendzhik district of the Black Sea region.

During the collectivization period, a collective farm was established in the village, incorporating all the nearby areas, including the settlements along the coast—Molokanova and Krasnaya Shchel.

In 1946, the village of Krasnaya Shchel was heavily damaged by a tornado. As a result, the residents of Krasnaya Shchel were relocated to Praskoveyevka.

In 1955, Praskoveyevka was registered as part of the False-Gelendzhik Rural Council of the Gelendzhik district.

On January 1, 1968, the village was transferred to the Greater Gelendzhik area and the administrative jurisdiction of the Gelendzhik City Council.

Since March 10, 2004, the village of Praskoveyevka has been part of the Divnomorsky rural district of the municipal formation of the resort city of Gelendzhik.

== Places of interest ==
North of the coast of Praskoveyevka is the Sail Rock, a natural monument consisting of vertical rock that is 25 meters high, 20 meters long and 1 meter thick, and that stands on the coast of the Black Sea. In the vicinity of the locality, Russian president Vladimir Putin has built a luxurious mansion, known as Putin's Palace.
