= Hydroaviasalon =

International air show in Russia

International Exhibition and Scientific Conference on Hydroaviation Hydroaviasalon
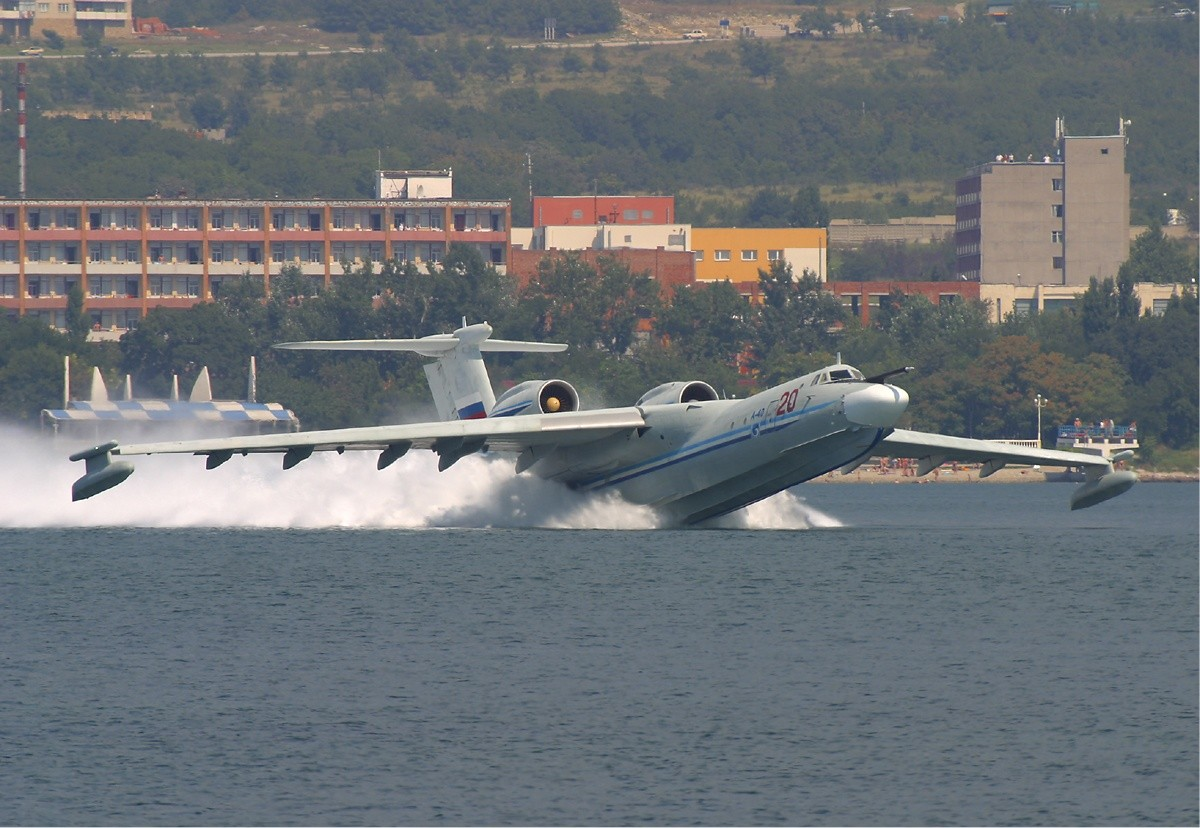
- Beriev A-40 at 2004 Hydroaviasalon airshow
- Genre: Air show
- Location: Gelendzhik/Bukhta Airport
- Country: Russia
- Established: 1996

Hydroaviasalon or in full International Exhibition and Scientific Conference on Hydroaviation (Russian: Гидроавиасалон, translit. Gidroaviasalon) is an international airshow on hydroaviation held in Russia. It's been held every even year since 1996 on a seashore at Gelendzhik. The event alternates with the MAKS Airshow on general aviation, which is held in odd years.

The airshow draws special attention to amphibious aircraft and seaplanes, ship-based aircraft, fire-fighting aviation, missiles and sea-based space systems, search-and-rescue aviation, sea ecological monitoring aviation, navigation equipment, small ships, launches and yachts, Wing-In-Ground effect (WIG) craft.

Aircraft such as Beriev Be-200, A-40, Be-12P-200 and Be-103 are frequently shown at Hydroaviasalon.

== Events ==
1. Gelendzhik '96
2. Gelendzhik '98
3. Gidroaviasalon '2000
4. Gidroaviasalon '2002
5. Gidroaviasalon '2004
6. Gidroaviasalon '2006
7. Gidroaviasalon '2008
8. Gidroaviasalon '2010 (September 9-12 2010).
9. Gidroaviasalon '2012 (September 6-9 2012)
10. Gidroaviasalon '2014
