= Sail Rock =

Sandstone monolith on shore of Black Sea

Coordinates: 44°26′19.1″N 38°11′3.8″E

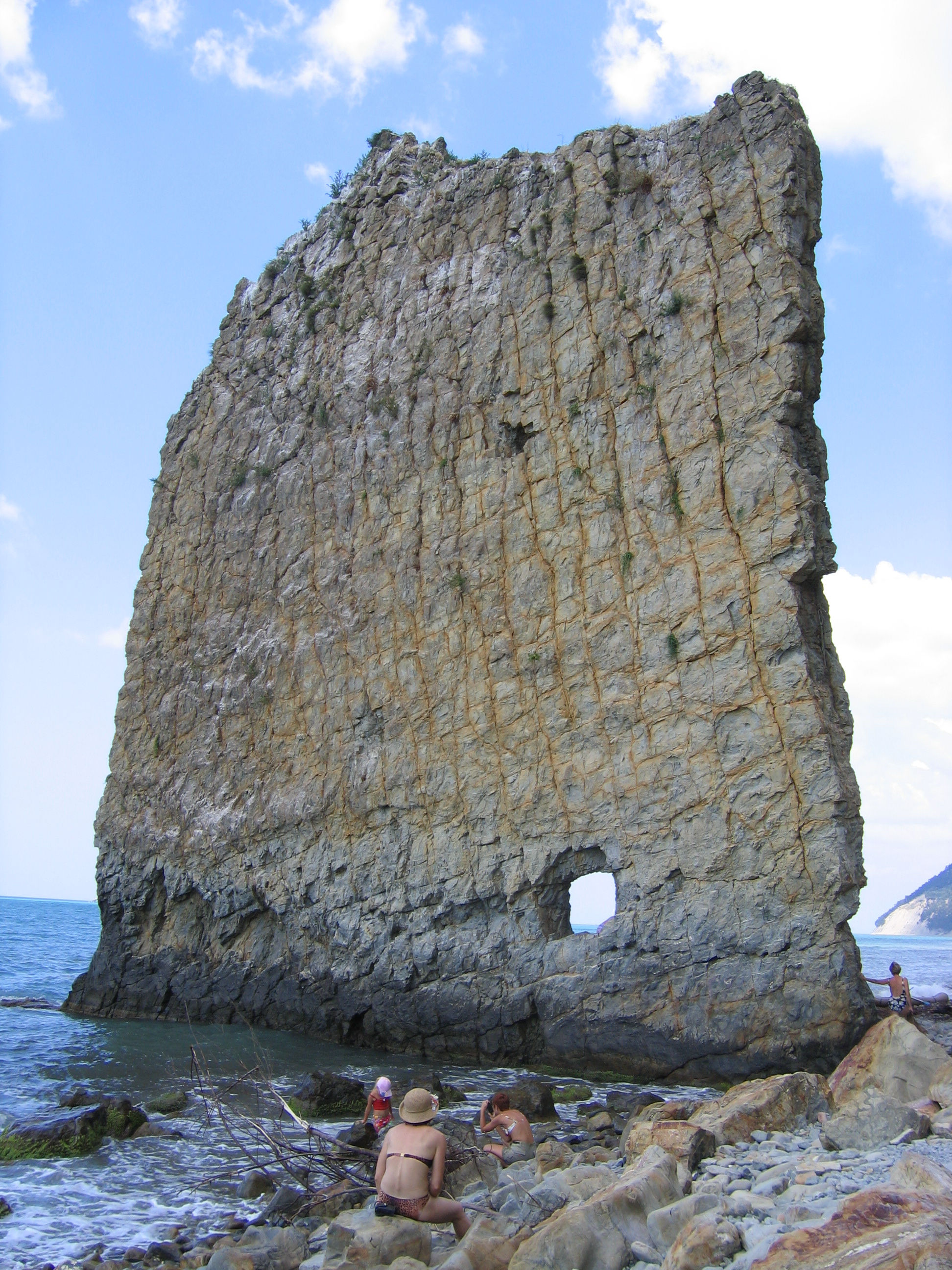
Parus Rock

Sail Rock, or Parus Rock (Russian: скала́ Па́рус, skala Parus), is a natural sandstone monolith of late Cretaceous age located on the shore of the Black Sea, in Krasnodar Krai, Russia. It resembles the outline of a ship's sail, hence its name.

The monolith lies 17 km to the southeast of Gelendzhik, near the village of Praskoveyevka (which is about 500 m from the coast) and the farmstead of Dzhankhot (approximately twice that distance from the coast). Sail Rock has a sheer vertical slope confronting the shore of the sea, isolated from the mass of basic rock by geological forces. It is more than three-fourths revealed by the tide and lies perpendicular to the coast. What is most remarkable about this landmark is its proportions. While the cliff is only a little more than one metre thick, its height is about 25 m and its length about 20. Thus, the form of the cliff is described as resembling the outline of a quadrangular sail.

An opening of unclear origin is located in the sail, approximatively 2.5 metres above the ground. Many guides state that the formation was a defence against mountain artillery during the Caucasian War. However, this version of the origin of the opening is under some doubt. In 1903, S. Vasyukov, who was investigating the Black Sea coast, wrote after the inspection of the cliff that it was "[..] shot from a battleship by seamen, they released 4 projectiles, but the wall remained firm, although the traces are noticeable, but they nowhere opened the rock [...]".

The appearance of this unique formation is explained by the pounding of the sea on the land (erosion), as well as the different strengths of its constituent rocks.

Sail Rock's status as a natural monument was declared November 24, 1971 by the administration of Gelendzhik. Protection of the rock was entrusted to the Divnomorskiy rural council. The surrounding beach and its environs are a place for outdoor leisure and recreation, including nearby health resorts. President Putin has a large estate about 1.5 miles down the coast.

== Gallery ==
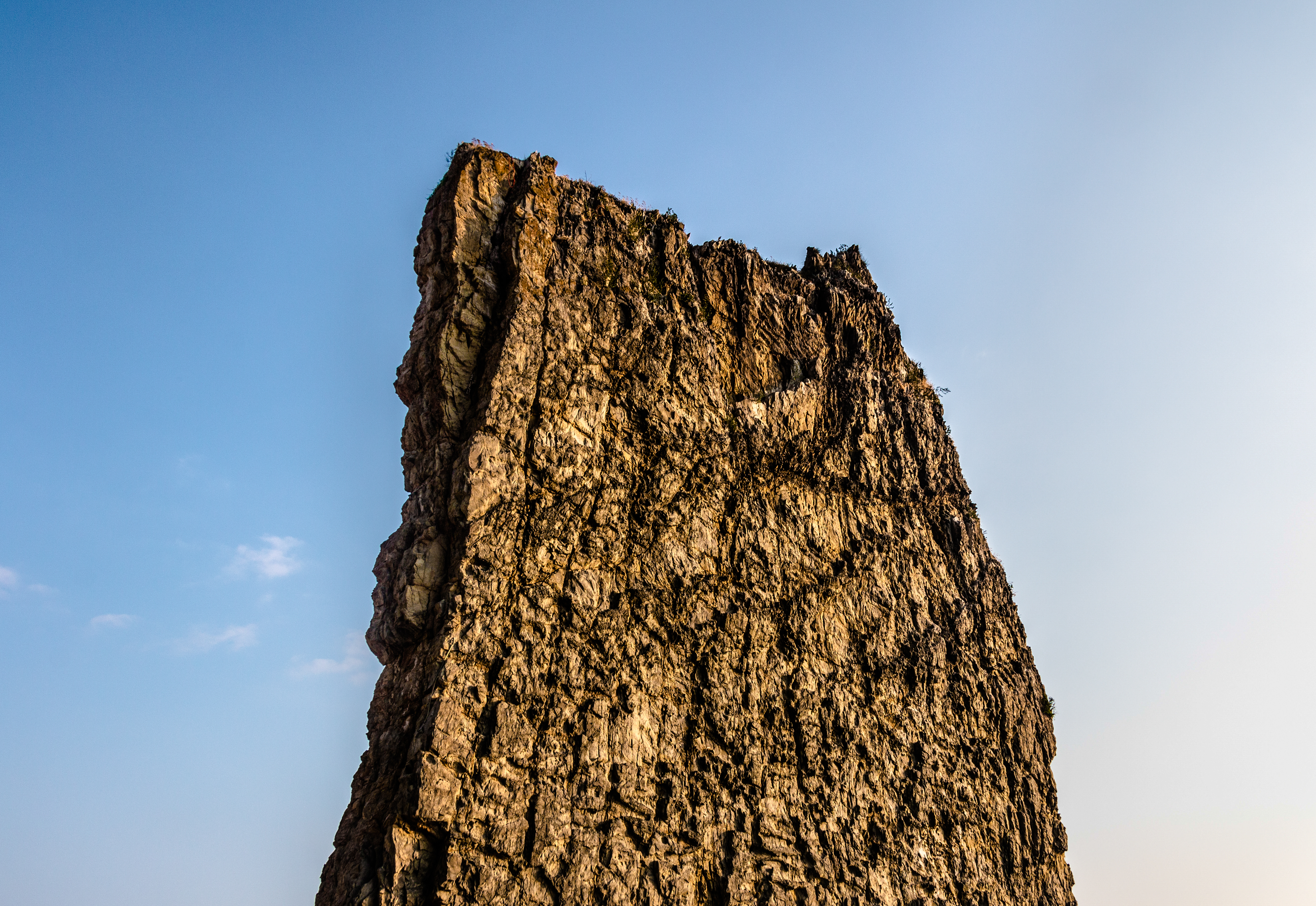
Sail Rock, view from below

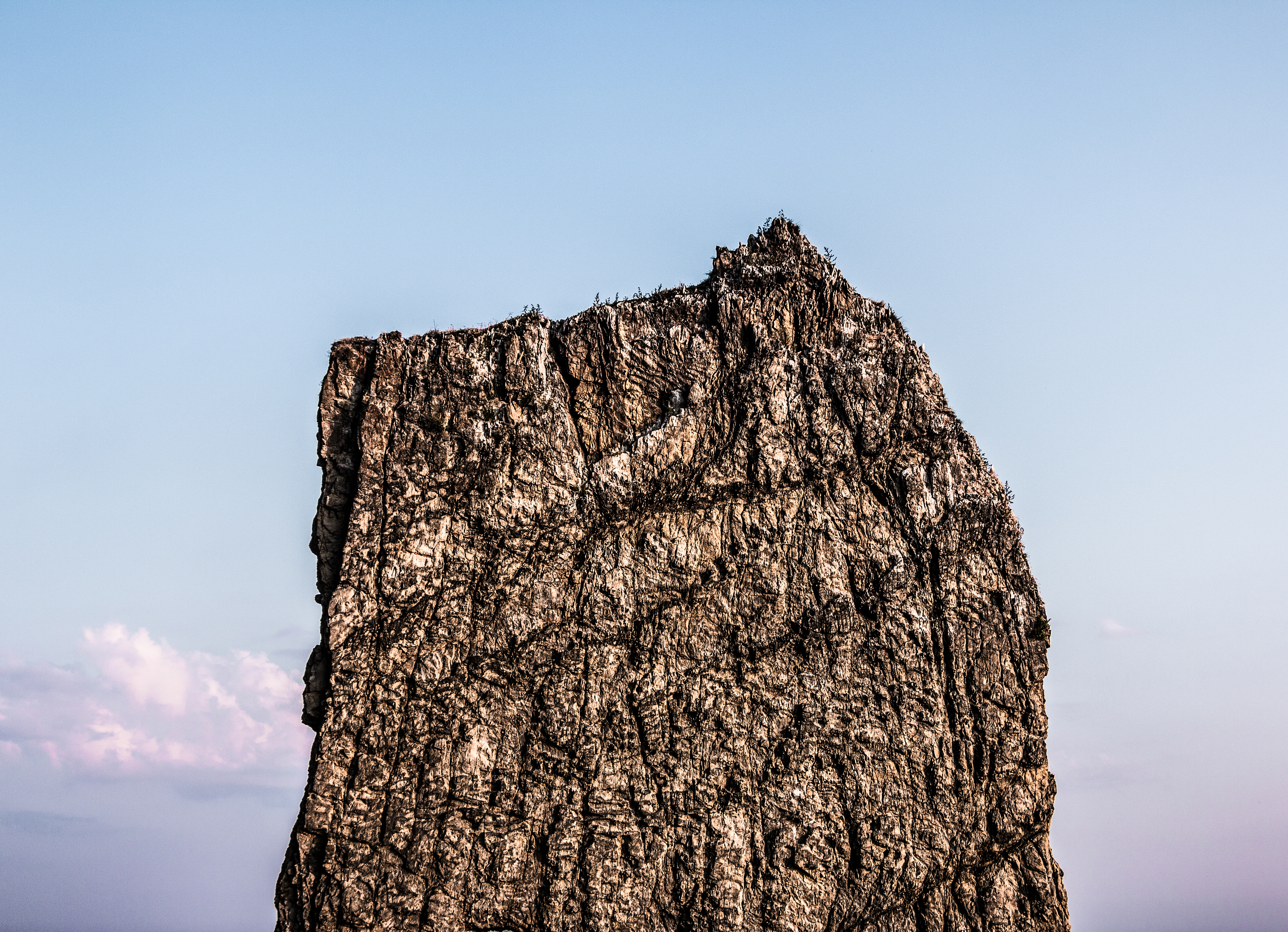
Sail Rock, side view

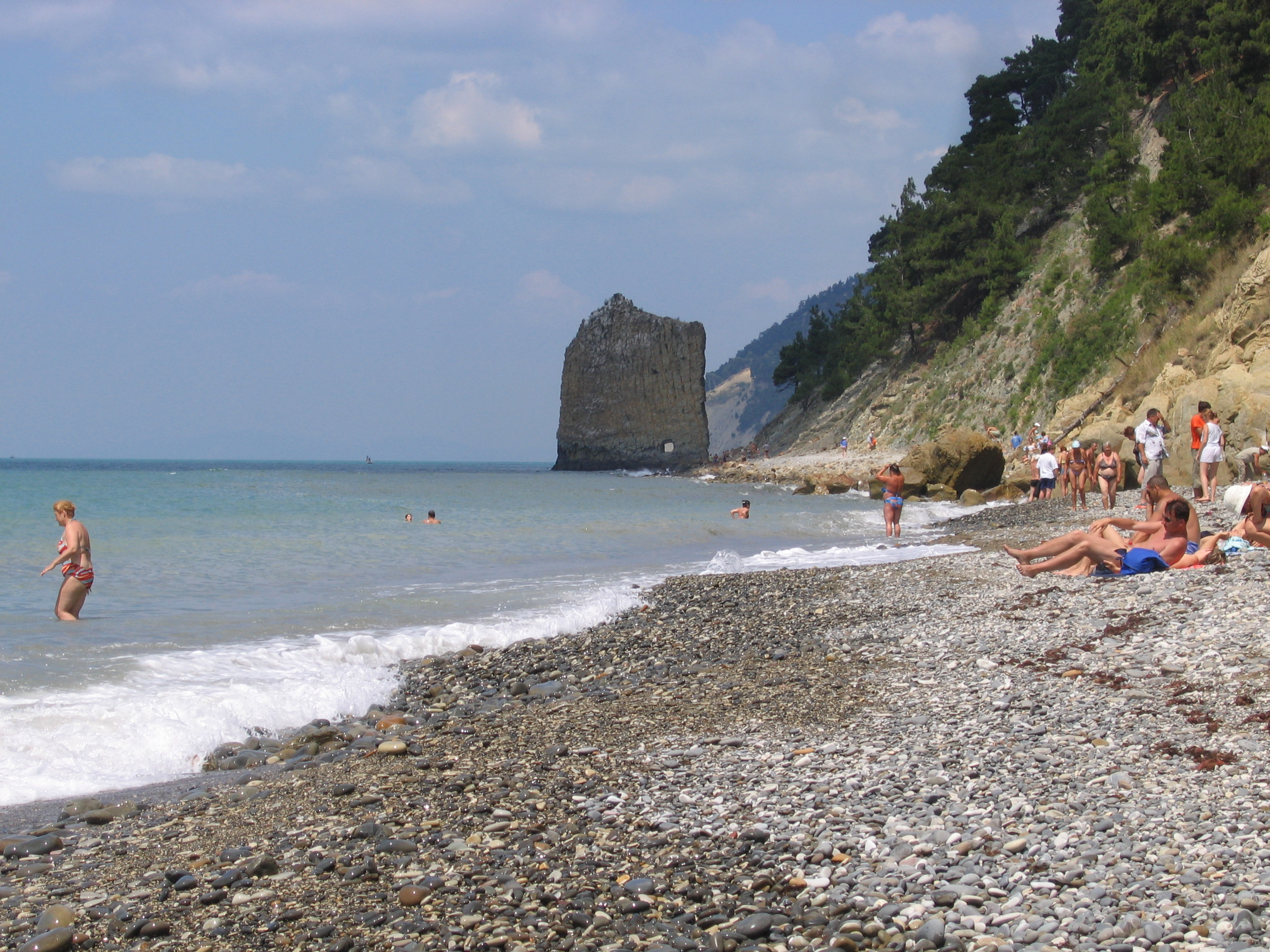
View of the rock from the beach of Praskoveyevka village

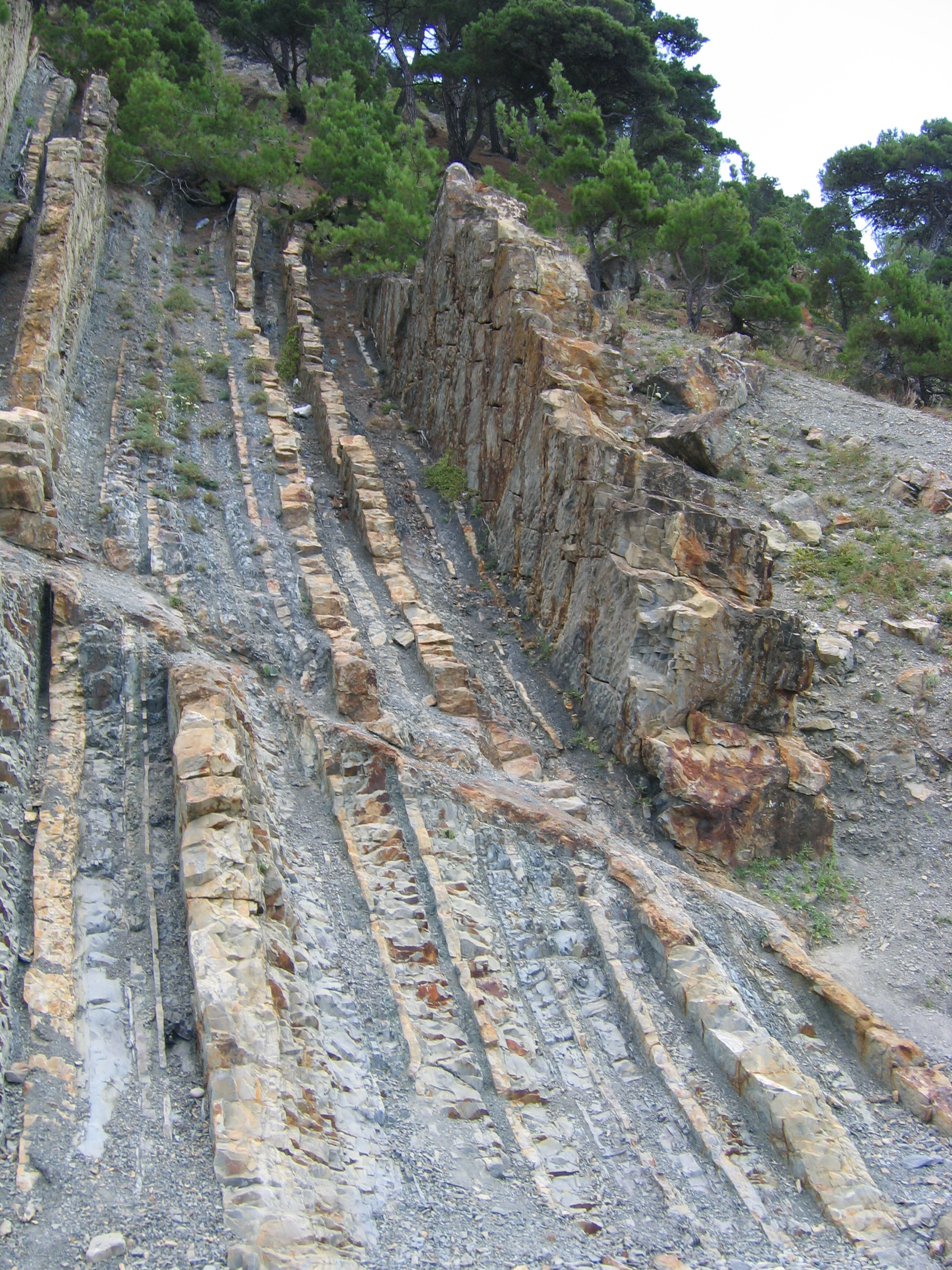
The outcrop shown on the right side of the image and Sail Rock were once a single rock formation

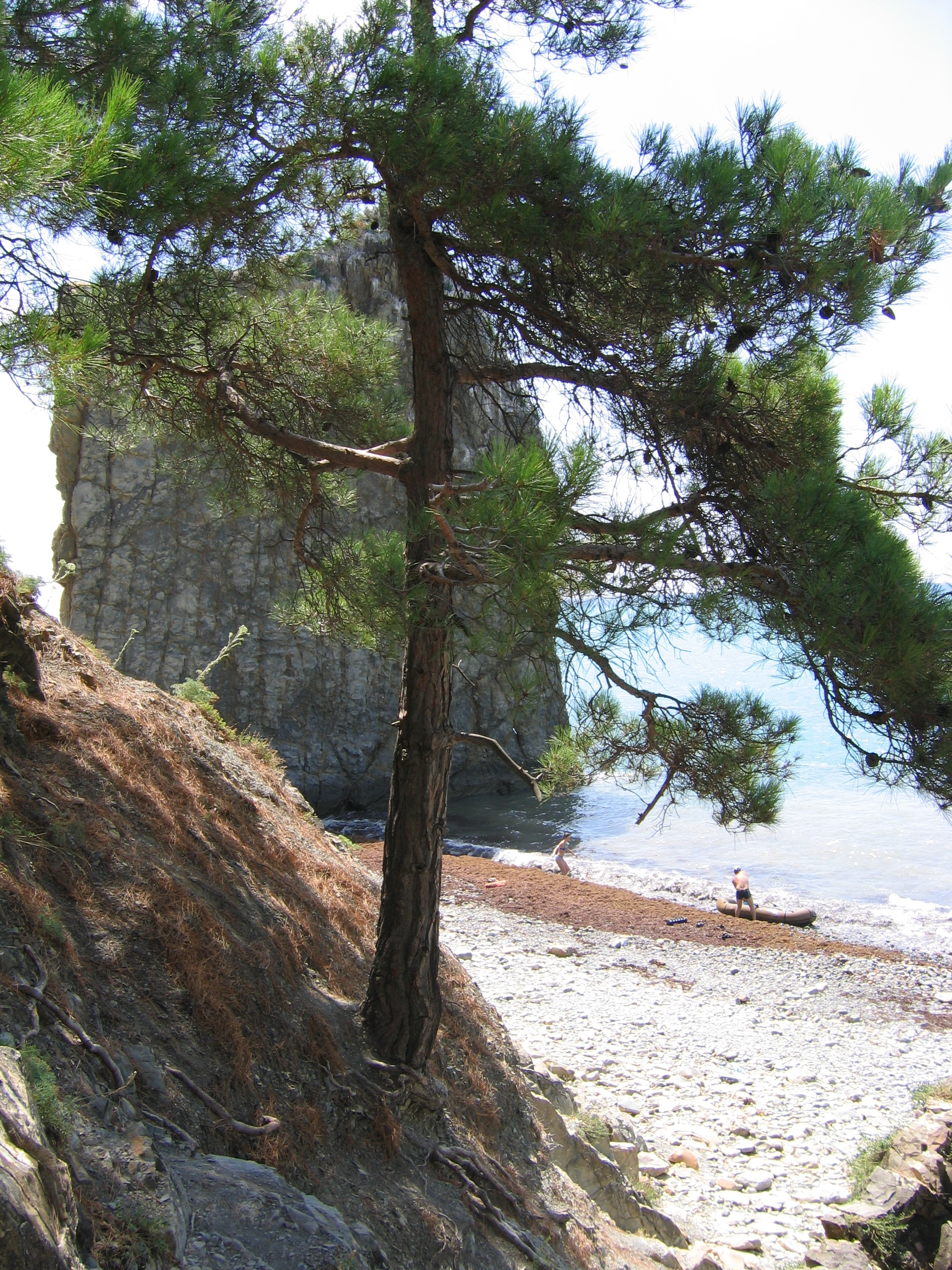
View from the coastal slope

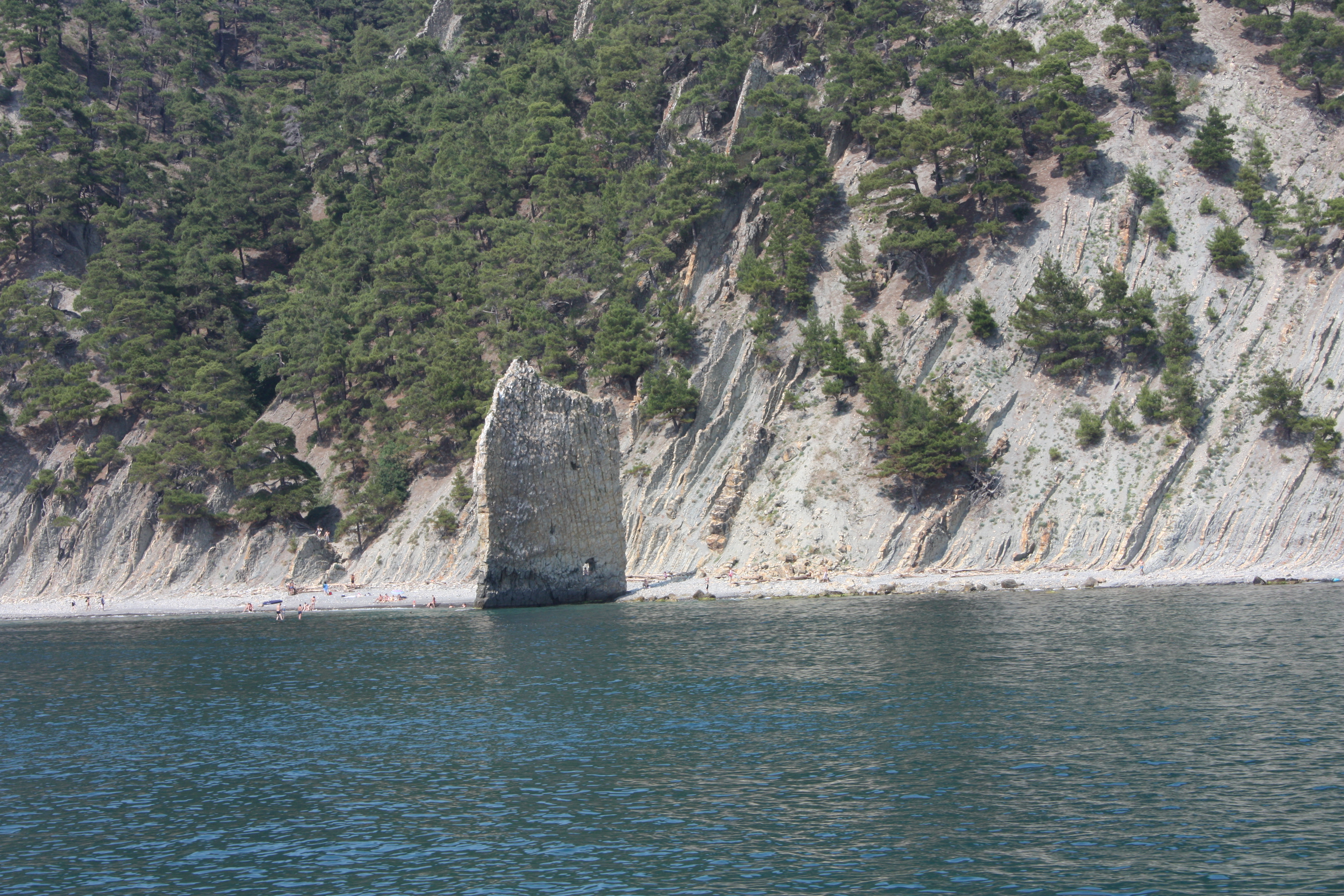
View from the Black Sea

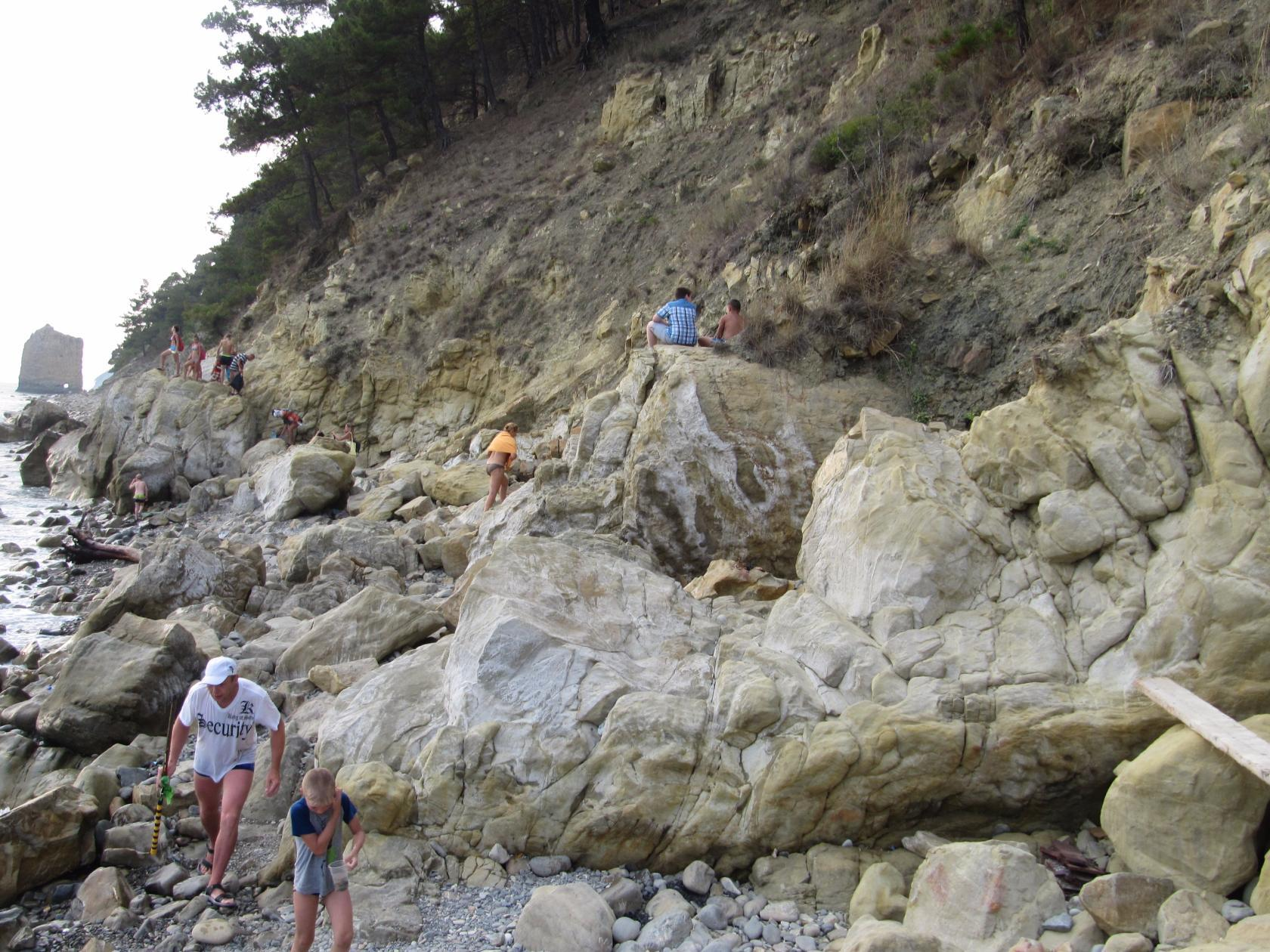
The challenging trail to Sail Rock

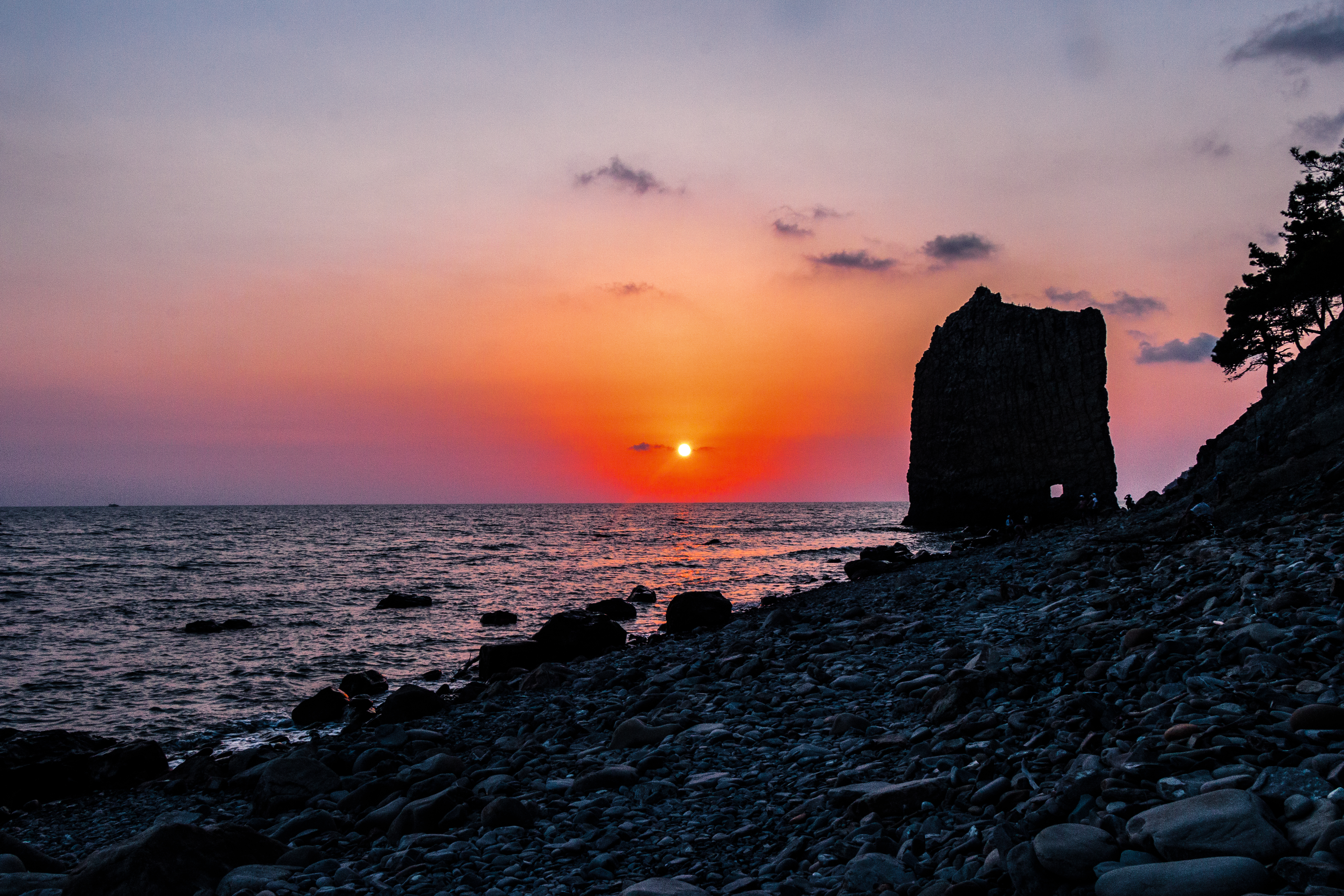
Sail Rock at sunset

== See also ==
- Golden Gate (Crimea)
