= Gelendzhik =

Resort town in Krasnodar Krai, Russia

Gelendzhik Геленджик
- Town
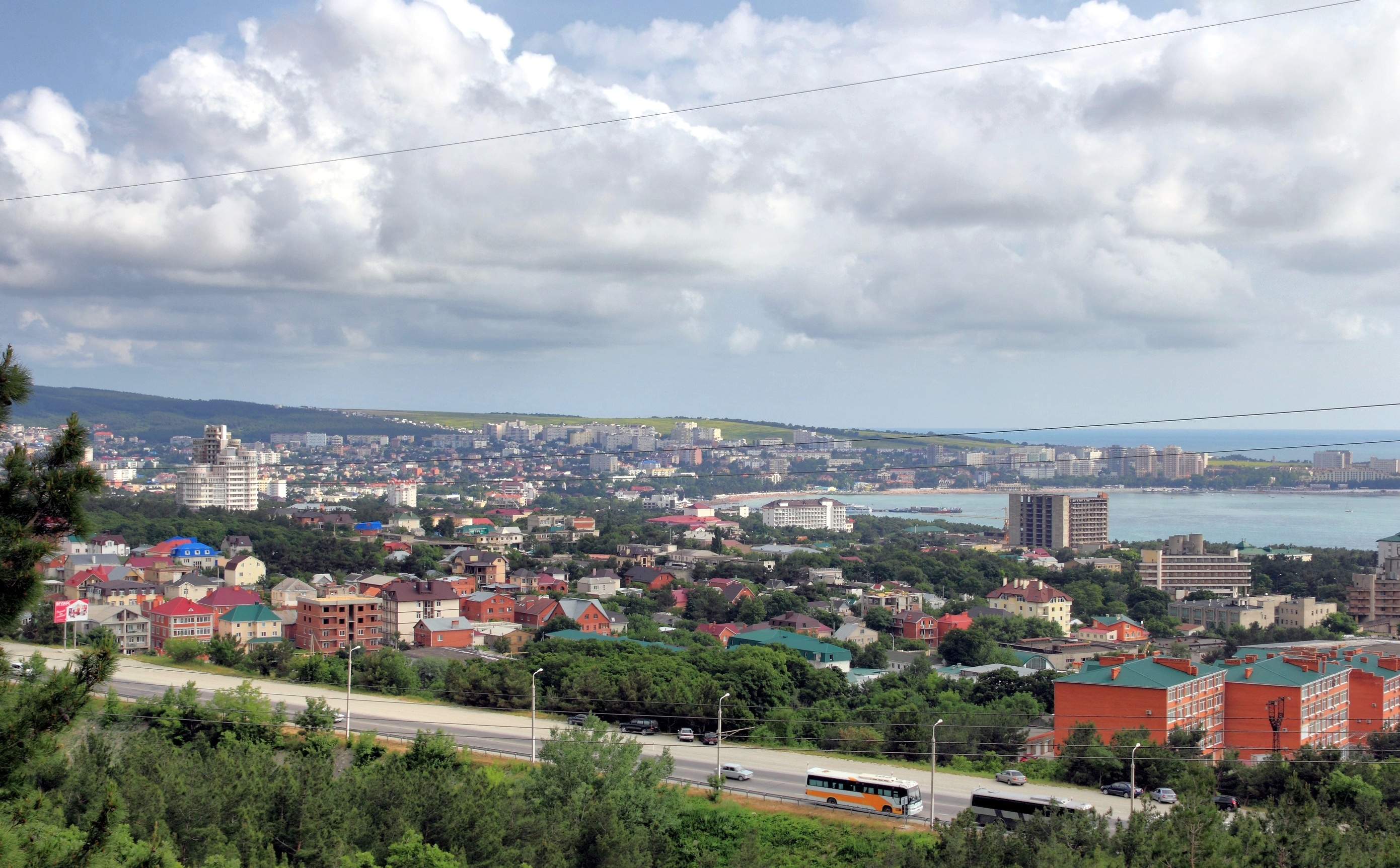
- View of Gelendzhik

- Flag Coat of arms
- Interactive map of Gelendzhik
- Location of Gelendzhik Gelendzhik (European Russia) Gelendzhik (Black Sea)
- Coordinates: 44°34′30″N 38°04′21″E
- Country: Russia
- Federal subject: Krasnodar Krai
- Founded: 1831
- Town status since: 1915

Government
  - Head: Viktor Khrestin

Area
  - Total: 27.9 km^{2} (10.8 sq mi)
- Elevation: 30 m (98 ft)

Population (2010 Census)
  - Total: 54,980
  - Estimate (2025): 80,534 (+46.5%)
  - Rank: 302nd in 2010
  - Density: 1,970/km^{2} (5,100/sq mi)

Administrative status
  - Subordinated to: Town of Gelendzhik
  - Capital of: Town of Gelendzhik

Municipal status
  - Urban okrug: Gelendzhik Urban Okrug
  - Capital of: Gelendzhik Urban Okrug
- Time zone: UTC+3 (MSK)
- Postal codes: 353460, 353461, 353465–353468, 353475, 353477
- Dialing code: +7 86141
- OKTMO ID: 03708000001
- Website: admgel.ru

Gelendzhik (Russian: Геленджик; Adyghe: Хъулъыжъий, romanized: Ḣułəžij) is a resort town in Krasnodar Krai, Russia, located on the Gelendzhik Bay of the Black Sea, between Novorossiysk (31 kilometers (19 mi) to the northwest) and Tuapse (93 kilometers (58 mi) to the southeast). Greater Gelendzhik sprawls for 102 kilometers (63 mi) along the coastline and covers an area of 122,754 hectares (303,330 acres), although only 1,926 hectares (4,760 acres) fall within the boundaries of Gelendzhik proper. Population: 80,204 (2021 census); 54,980 (2010 census); 50,012 (2002 census); 47,711 (1989 Soviet census).

== Etymology ==
The toponym Gelendzhik likely originates from the indigenous Adyghe name for the area, Хъулъыжъий (Khulyzhyy), which translates as 'little pasture,' where хъулъы (khulye) means 'pasture' or 'clearing,' and жъий (zhyy) means 'little.' Folk etymology derives the toponym from Turkish gelin, meaning 'bride,' with -cik, a diminutive and affectionate suffix, thus meaning 'little bride,' possibly because it was a major slave trade centre, serving as the main port for the export of local girls to harems. In 2010, a sculpture titled 'White Bride' was installed on the Gelendzhik waterfront.

== History ==
Gelendzhik is one of the most ancient settlements on the coast of the Black Sea. In antiquity, the Gelendzhik Bay was the site of a minor Greek outpost in the 6th century BC, mentioned as Torikos (Greek: Τορικος) in the Periplus of Pseudo-Scylax. It is unknown to Hellenistic sources, but reappears in Roman ones under the name of Pagrae in 64 BC. As a Byzantine colony, it was wiped out by the invading Mongols.

During the late Middle Ages, the Genoese Republic had a notable influence on the region, while the Ghisolfi, a Genoese-Jewish family, had a prominent role in the trade and commerce in Gazaria. During this period, the town was named Maurolaca or Mauro Laco, and was considered one of the most important Genoese colonies in the Black Sea. From the late 15th century, it belonged to the Ottoman Empire.

Before Russia secured the coast as a result of the Treaty of Adrianople in 1829, a brisk slave trade had been carried on between the mountaineers and the Ottoman Empire. The tribes of Shapsugs and Natukhajs inhabited the area until the end of the Caucasian War. In 1831, Russian troops under the command of E. A. Berkhman built the Gelendzhik fortress, which became an outpost as well as a naval base for the Black Sea Fleet. However, during the Crimean War of 1854–1856, it was destroyed and abandoned. The fortress was rebuilt in 1857, and in 1864, the stanitsa of Gelendzhiksaya was built in its place. In 1915, it was given town status.

In the late 19th century, Gelendzhik developed as a spa resort, and in the early 20th century, sanatoriums were built. A sanatorium for children with bone tuberculosis was opened in 1913. According to the 1926 Soviet census, the population was 45.4% Russian, 25.0% Ukrainian, and 20.7% Greek. During World War II, it became the main base for small ships of the Black Sea Fleet. In 1970, it became a resort of all-union significance in the Soviet Union. The town is home to more than 180 sanatoriums, holiday hotels, rest houses, and tourist centres.

== Description ==
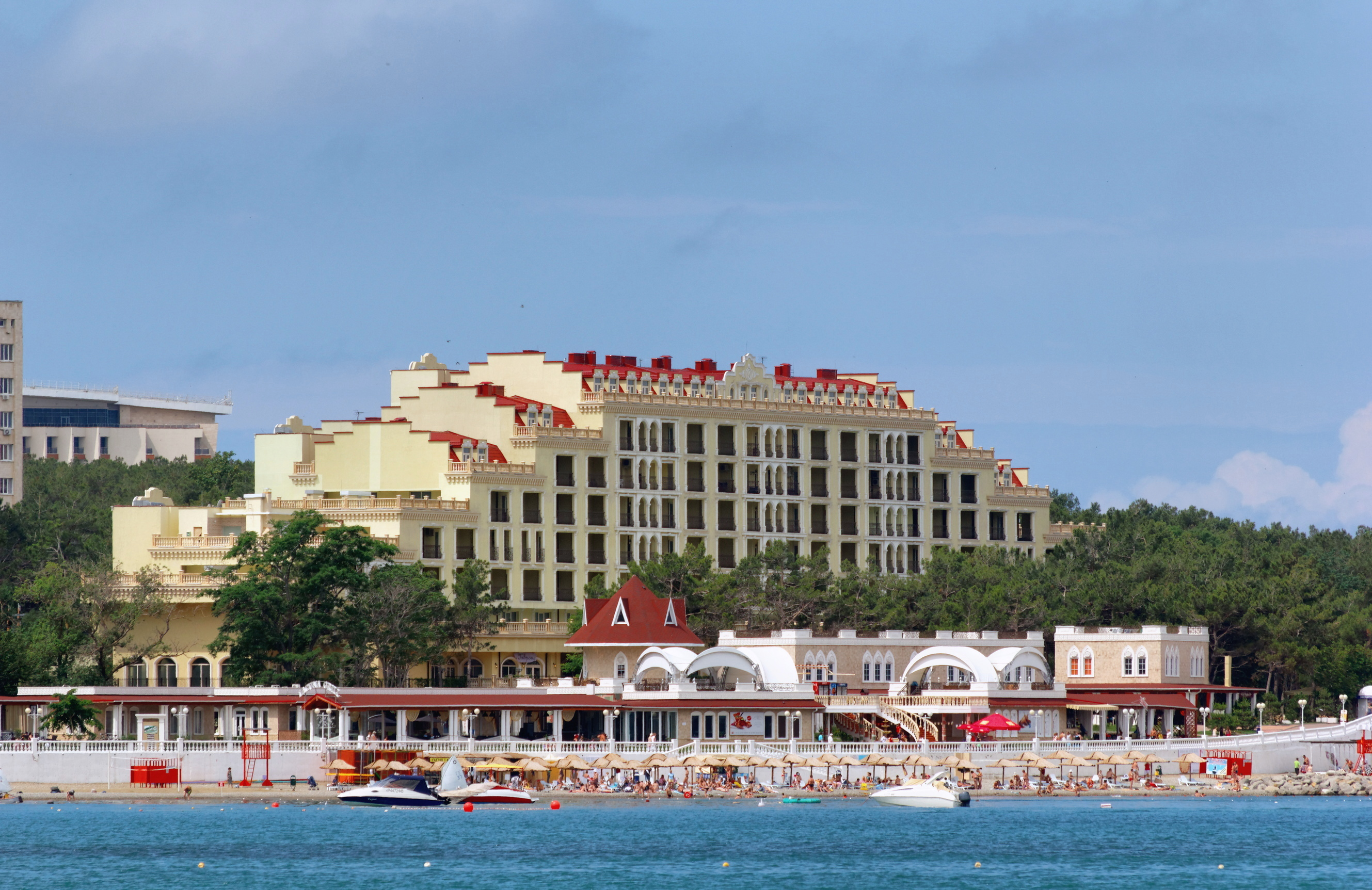
Residential complex in Gelendzhik

During the Soviet period, Gelendzhik was developed as a resort town. It possesses sand beaches, three waterparks, two chairlift lines, and two Orthodox churches (from 1909 and 1913, respectively). The environs of Gelendzhik are noted for a chain of waterfalls, an outcrop of dolmens, two extremely ancient pine and juniper groves, and the Sail Rock, located 17 kilometers (11 mi) from the town's central area. The coastal village of Arkhipo-Osipovka, administrated from Gelendzhik, contains the terminus of the Blue Stream gas pipeline. An annual hydroaviasalon is held in Gelendzhik since 1996.

Revealed on 29 March 2001 between Bietingen and Schaffhausen, Litolmore Trading Limited, a company which conducts business in mineral fertilizers, coal, oil, gas, fuel oil, aviation and diesel fuel, is a Gelendzhik firm.

A 17,691 square metres (190,420 sq ft) palace allegedly built for Vladimir Putin is located on the Gelendzhik Bay not far from the city.

== Administrative and municipal status ==
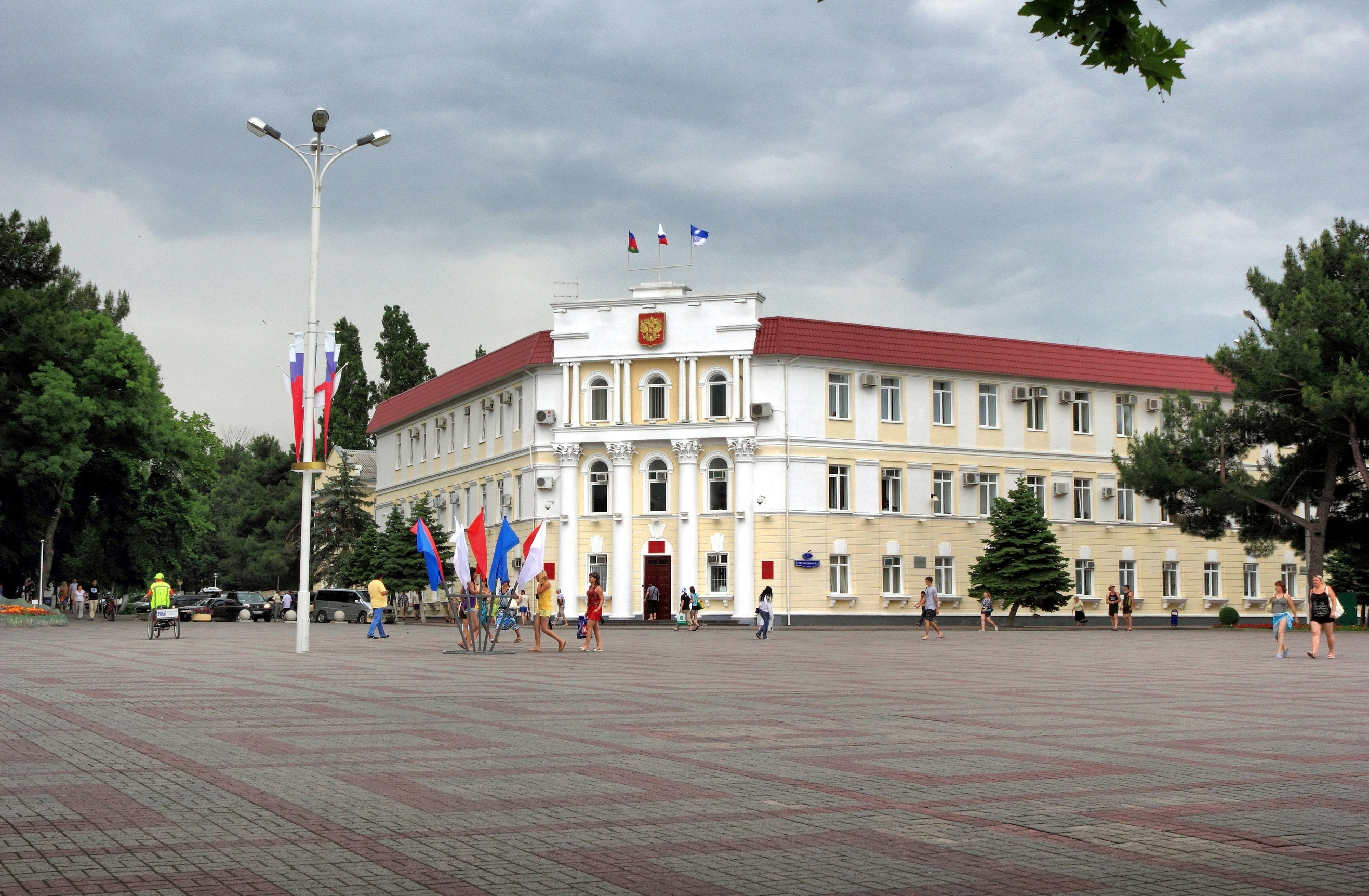
Gelendzhik town administration building

Within the framework of administrative divisions, it is, together with twenty rural localities, incorporated as the Town of Gelendzhik—an administrative unit with the status equal to that of the districts. As a municipal division, the Town of Gelendzhik is incorporated as Gelendzhik Urban Okrug.

== Climate ==
Gelendzhik has a borderline humid subtropical climate (Köppen climate classification: Cfa) and a Mediterranean climate (Köppen climate classification: Csa). The climate of Gelendzhik is noticeably drier than Novorossiysk and Tuapse. Winters are mild and snowfall is light. Summers are hot with warm evenings. Sometimes Gelendzhik has experienced big floods as it happened in 2012 (2012 Krasnodar Krai floods).

Climate data for Gelendzhik
Month	Jan	Feb	Mar	Apr	May	Jun	Jul	Aug	Sep	Oct	Nov	Dec	Year
Record high °C (°F)	20.0 (68.0)	21.0 (69.8)	26.4 (79.5)	28.2 (82.8)	32.0 (89.6)	36.0 (96.8)	39.0 (102.2)	38.7 (101.7)	34.0 (93.2)	29.3 (84.7)	25.5 (77.9)	22.0 (71.6)	39.0 (102.2)
Mean daily maximum °C (°F)	6.4 (43.5)	7.3 (45.1)	10.9 (51.6)	16.6 (61.9)	21.5 (70.7)	24.7 (76.5)	28.6 (83.5)	29.9 (85.8)	23.9 (75.0)	18.9 (66.0)	12.5 (54.5)	8.2 (46.8)	16.8 (62.2)
Daily mean °C (°F)	3.9 (39.0)	4.0 (39.2)	7.1 (44.8)	12.0 (53.6)	17.0 (62.6)	20.6 (69.1)	23.9 (75.0)	24.6 (76.3)	19.2 (66.6)	14.1 (57.4)	8.9 (48.0)	5.3 (41.5)	13.0 (55.4)
Mean daily minimum °C (°F)	1.3 (34.3)	0.7 (33.3)	3.3 (37.9)	7.4 (45.3)	12.4 (54.3)	16.4 (61.5)	19.1 (66.4)	18.4 (65.1)	14.4 (57.9)	9.3 (48.7)	5.2 (41.4)	2.4 (36.3)	9.2 (48.6)
Record low °C (°F)	−22.0 (−7.6)	−15.7 (3.7)	−11.0 (12.2)	−7 (19)	0.3 (32.5)	5.6 (42.1)	9.5 (49.1)	6.9 (44.4)	1.0 (33.8)	−18.0 (−0.4)	−19.6 (−3.3)	−16.1 (3.0)	−22.0 (−7.6)
Average precipitation mm (inches)	85.4 (3.36)	70.8 (2.79)	72.3 (2.85)	61.7 (2.43)	70.6 (2.78)	67.2 (2.65)	39.8 (1.57)	39.1 (1.54)	45.4 (1.79)	51.7 (2.04)	72.6 (2.86)	94.1 (3.70)	770.7 (30.34)
Source: meteoblue.com

== Transportation ==
Gelendzhik is served by the Gelendzhik Airport. A new terminal of Gelendzhik Airport was built in December 2021.

== Twin towns – sister cities ==
Gelendzhik is twinned with:

- Cramlington, United Kingdom
- Ayia Napa, Cyprus
- Angoulême, France
- Hildesheim, Germany
- Kallithea, Greece
- Netanya, Israel
- Vitebsk, Belarus
