= Sergei Kolesnikov =

Sergei or Sergey Kolesnikov may refer to:

- Sergei Kolesnikov (whistleblower) (born 1948), Russian businessman and whistleblower
- Sergei Kolesnikov (businessman) (born 1972), Russian billionaire
- Sergey Kolesnikov (cyclist) (born 1986), Russian road bicycle racer
- Sergei Kolesnikov (actor) (born 1955), Soviet and Russian film and theater actor
- Sergey Kolesnikov (judoka) (born 1968), Russian judoka

== See also ==
- Kolesnikov (disambiguation)
