= Putin's Palace =

Palace in Russia allegedly built for Vladimir Putin

- «Дворец Путина»
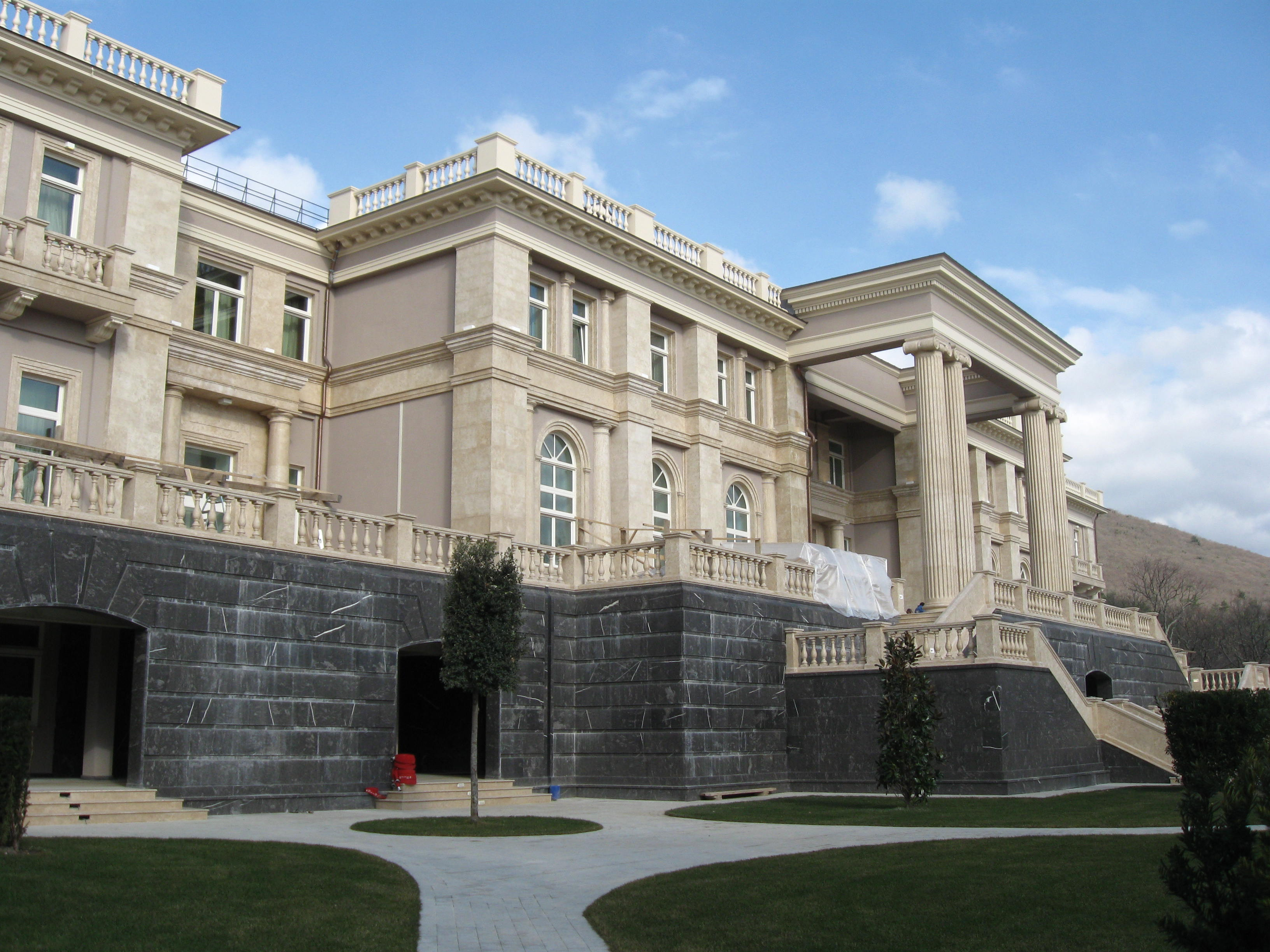
- Alternative names: Residence at Cape Idokopas

General information
- Type: Palace
- Architectural style: Italianate
- Location: Gelendzhik Urban Okrug, Krasnodar Krai, Russia
- Construction started: 2005
- Cost: $1,400,000,000 (estimate)
- Owner: Alexander Ponomarenko (claimed; since 2011); Arkady Rotenberg (claimed; since 2021); Vladimir Putin (allegedly; denied)

Technical details
- Size: 17,691 square metres (190,420 sq ft)

Design and construction
- Architect: Lanfranco Cirillo
- Main contractor: Federal Agency for Special Construction

"Putin's Palace" (Russian: «Дворец Путина», romanized: "Dvorets Putina") is an Italianate palace complex located on the Black Sea coast near Gelendzhik, Krasnodar Krai, Russia.

The complex first came to public attention in 2010 after whistleblower Sergei Kolesnikov published an open letter to Russian president Dmitry Medvedev exposing the construction of the palace. Kolesnikov also stated that the undertaking was run by Nikolai Shamalov who was acting on behalf of Vladimir Putin. Alexander Ponomarenko was later reported to have ownership.

The complex drew wider public attention in 2021, when Russian opposition leader Alexei Navalny's Anti Corruption Foundation (FBK) released an investigative documentary film about it which detailed a corruption scheme allegedly headed by Putin and claimed that the palace was built for the president's personal use. The FBK investigation estimated the cost of the build to be over 100 billion rubles (US$956 million) at 2022 prices. Putin denied that the palace belonged to him, with the Kremlin saying that it is a private venture owned by various businessmen whose names could not be revealed by the state. Following the film's release, Arkady Rotenberg, who has close ties to Putin, claimed ownership of the palace.

In 2024, the Russian outlet Proekt reported that parts of the Palace had been reconverted, reconfiguring various entertainment rooms – such as a casino, pole-dancing room and room for miniature railroads – into lounging rooms and a chapel with a dedication to Saint Volodymyr of Kiev.

== Location and buildings ==
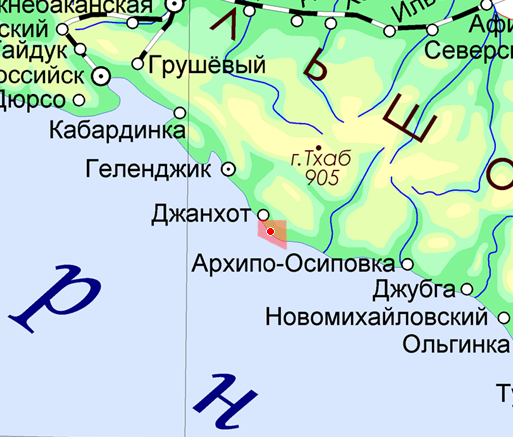
Red area: Prohibited Special Use Airspace P116 near Cape Idokopas. Dark-red dot: the Palace.

The residence is located at 44.419°N 38.205°E on Cape Idokopas, near the village of Praskoveyevka. Cape Idokopas (Russian: Мыс Идокопас) is a promontory on the Black Sea coast of Russia near Gelendzhik, Krasnodar Krai. The headland is lined with cliffs but is mostly flat on its summit, which is heavily forested with Turkish pine trees. It is bordered by a reef that makes offshore navigation hazardous.

The residence overlooks Russia's Black Sea coast, and is built on a block of land with a total area of 74 hectares (180 acres). The airspace around the palace (see image) is regulated as Prohibited Special Use Airspace P116 (i.e. a no-fly zone), which the Russian Federal Security Service (FSB) stated was to protect an FSB border-post in the area from increased foreign intelligence activity.

There is a vast number of buildings on the palace complex, including a house with an area of 17,700 square metres (191,000 sq ft), an arboretum, a greenhouse, a helipad, an ice palace, a church, an amphitheater, a "tea house" (guest house), a gas station, an 80-metre (260 ft) bridge, and a special tunnel inside the mountain with a tasting room.

The main building boasts a large indoor swimming pool, aquadiskotheque arrangement, spa, saunas, Turkish baths, meat and fish shops, vegetable and dessert shops, a warehouse, a reading room, a music lounge, a hookah bar, a theater, a cinema, a wine cellar, a casino, and about a dozen guest bedrooms. The master bedroom is 260 square metres (2,800 sq ft) in size.

The house was designed by the Italian architect Lanfranco Cirillo, who has designed properties for many of Russia's elite.

=== Palace interiors ===
Photographs of the palace's interiors from 2010 were published in January 2011 on the RuLeaks website (a Russian analogue of WikiLeaks). They were presumably taken by ordinary workers servicing the facility (one or more of them appeared in the photos themselves, their faces were obscured).

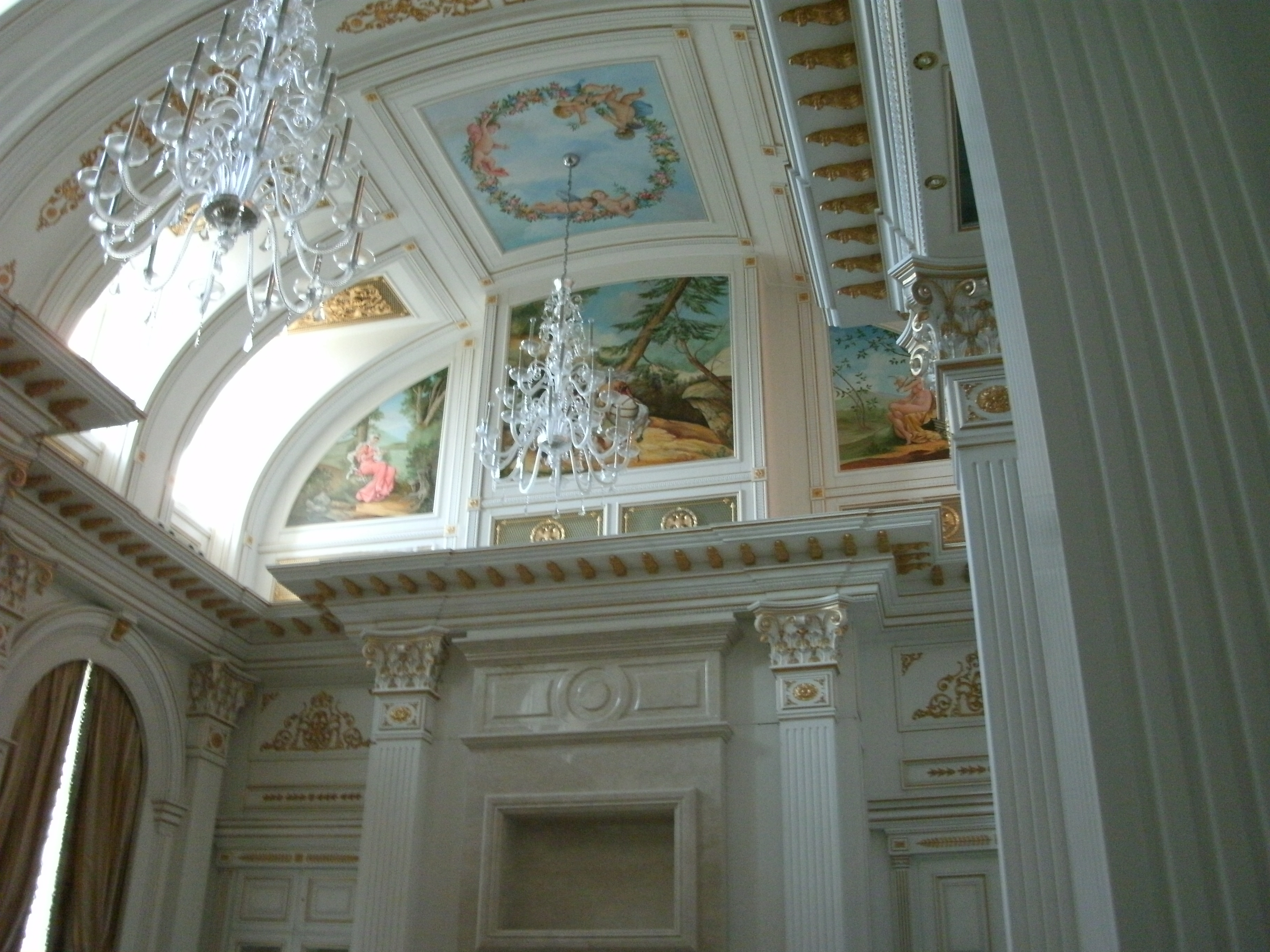
Chandeliers of the residence

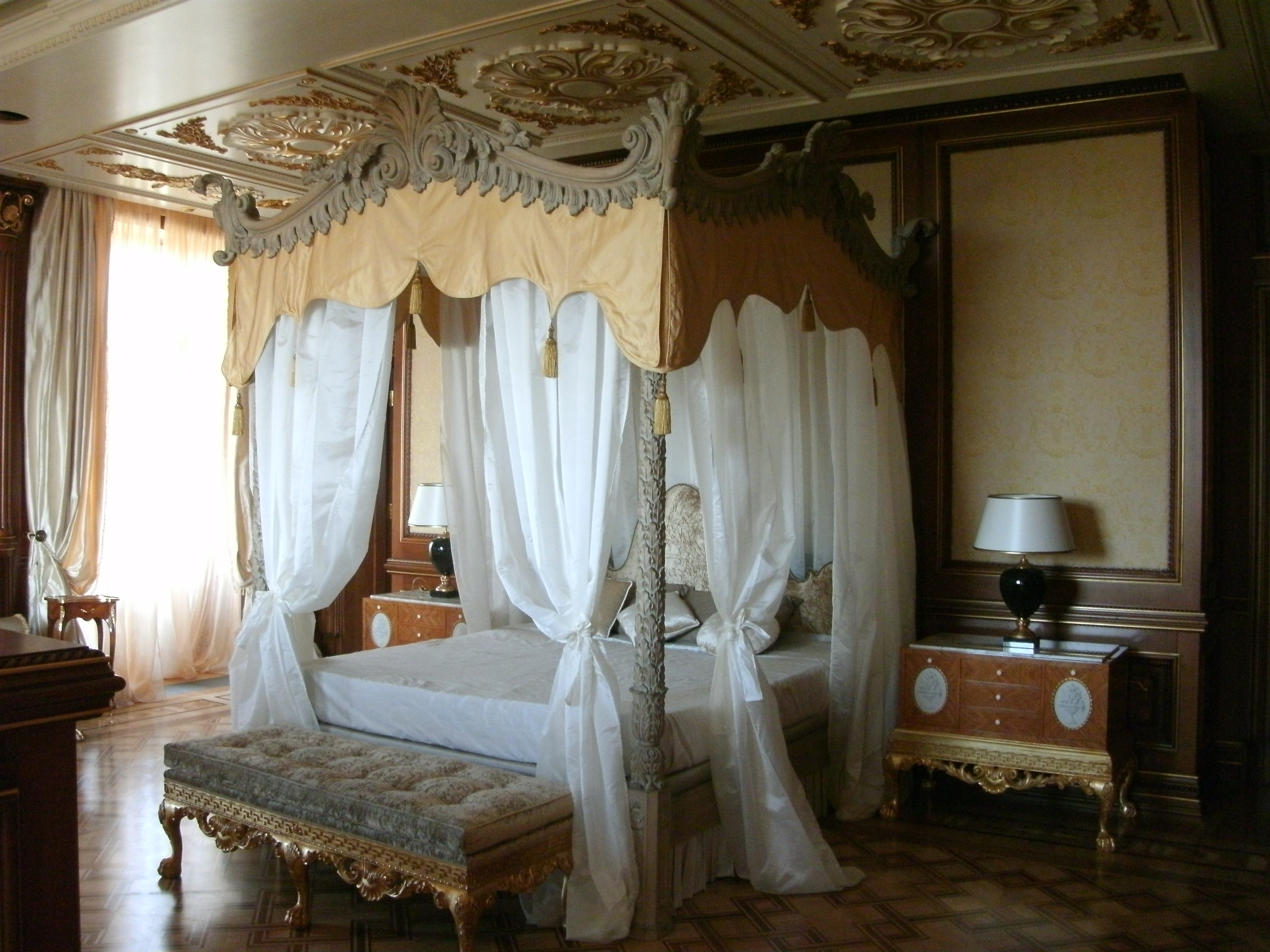
One of the bedrooms in the residence with a canopy bed

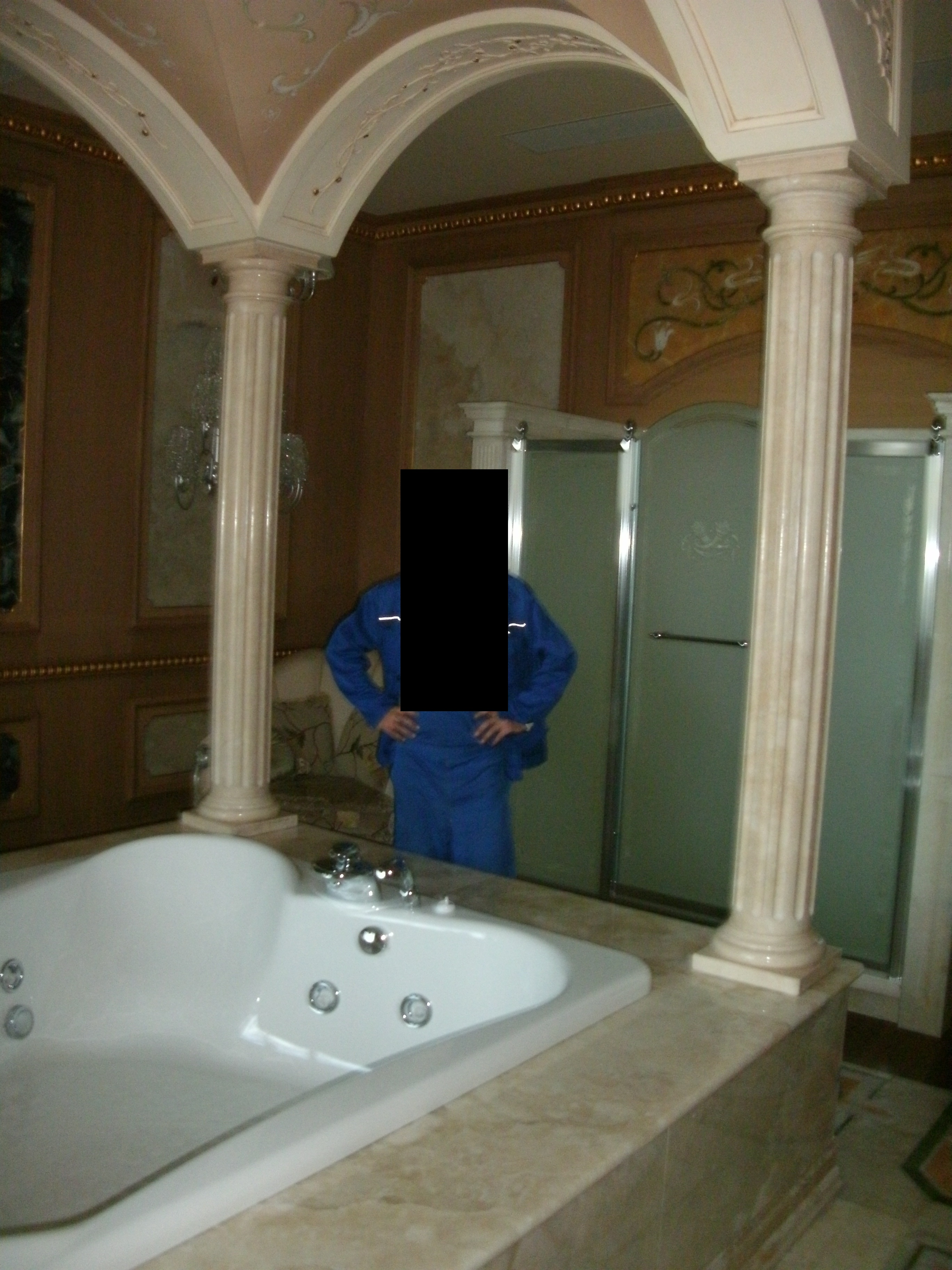
A multi-person jacuzzi in one of the residence's bedrooms

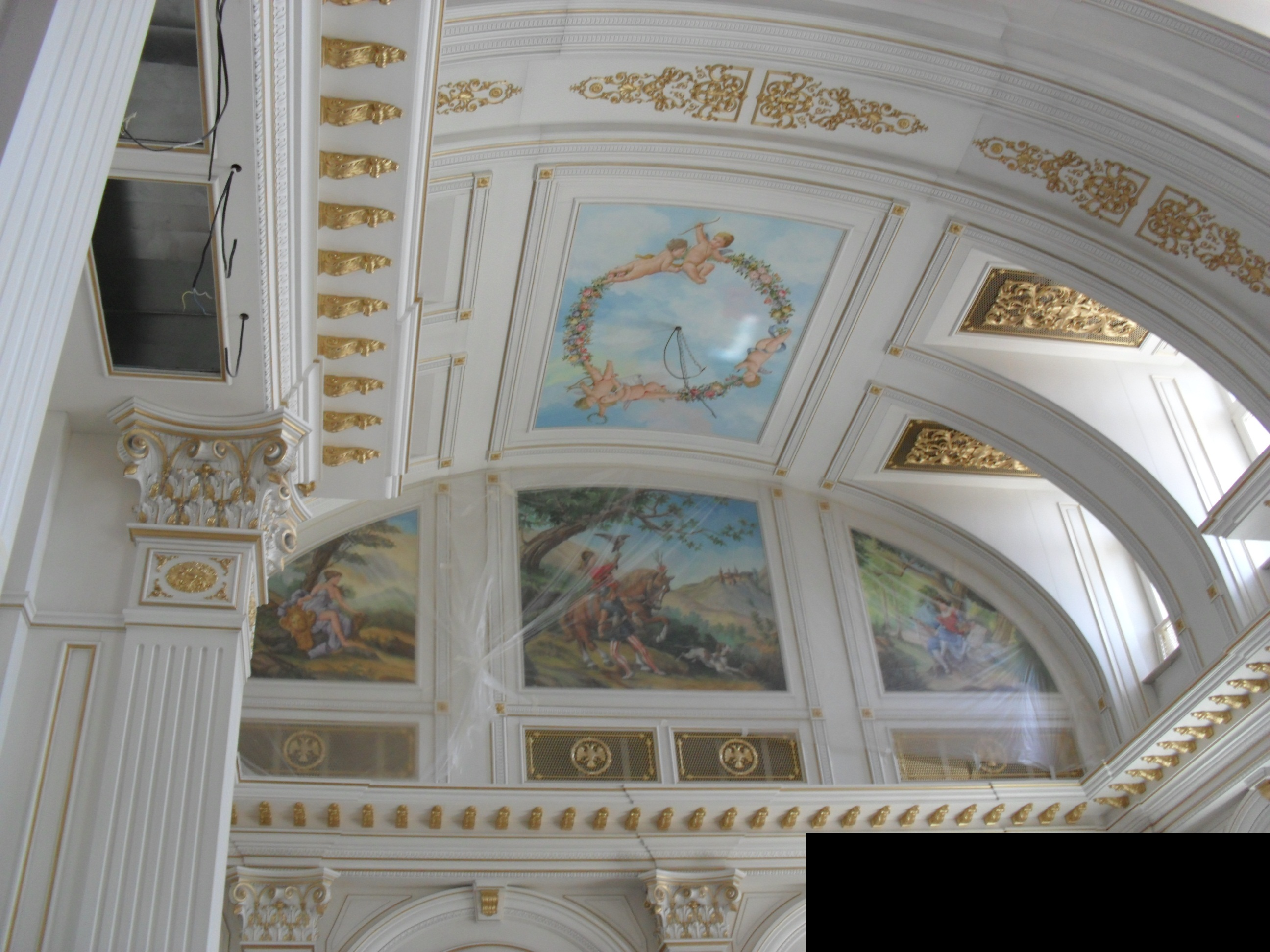
Ceiling elements of the residence. The chandeliers have not yet been hung.

External videos
- Золотое безумие. Реальные фотографии дворца Путина on YouTube (44 min 7 sec)

As noted above, on 20 January 2022, Navalny's team published 479 photographs taken inside the facility around 2014, before the mold damage.

Observers noted the similarity of the interiors captured in the new photographs to the initial 3D visualization, created from architectural plans, previously available photos, and furniture catalogs for the 2021 investigative film. At the same time, the investigators themselves focused on the hookah lounge (striptease hall), which, in their opinion, actually looked "much worse" than in the 3D visualization, which was created without any real photographs of the room. The abundance of double-headed eagles in the interior design and the excessive gilding of the rooms also drew criticism. In May 2024, the FBK and Proekt published secretly made video recordings of the updated interiors and working documentation for the palace reconstruction project.

== History ==
=== Start of construction (2005) ===
On 10 June 2005, an investment agreement was concluded between the Presidential Property Management Department of Russia, FSUE "Tuapse Holiday House", OAO "Lirus", and FSUE "Enterprise for the Supply of Products" of the Presidential Property Management Department of Russia for the construction of a "boarding house in the area of the village of Praskoveevka, Gelendzhik, Krasnodar Krai". The subject of this agreement was the construction of a facility on a 740,000 m² plot of land. The project's investor, the Lirus company, was to invest at least 400 million rubles in the construction. The project was scheduled for completion in 2008, after which 30% of the total area was to be transferred to the Presidential Property Management Department, and 70% to the investor. Under an addendum dated 10 November 2008, to the previously concluded agreement, the client-developer became the FGU "Military Unit 1473" of the Federal Protective Service (FSO).

As early as November of the same year, the first reports of construction starting on Cape Idokopas appeared in the press. The fence and the construction site that appeared there for a "year-round children's camp," a facility of the FSUE "Dagomys" of the Presidential Property Management Department of the Russian Federation, also attracted the attention of eco-activists.

=== Kolesnikov's letter (2010) and Reuters investigation (2014) ===
In December 2010, a letter about corruption addressed to Russian President Dmitry Medvedev appeared online in Russian and English, authored by St. Petersburg businessman Sergey Kolesnikov. The letter alleged that a "recreation complex" was being built on the Black Sea coast since 2005 for the personal use of Vladimir Putin, with a cost that, according to the author, had reached 1 billion US dollars. Kolesnikov stated that he wrote the letter so that "the Russian people and the president would know the truth," and awaited a reaction from Dmitry Medvedev, which never came.

In the letter to Medvedev and later in an interview with the RTVI television channel and other media, Kolesnikov revealed the financing scheme for the residence's construction. According to Kolesnikov, in 1992, with Putin's involvement, the company "Petromed" was created, which dealt with healthcare projects and of which the letter's author himself was a shareholder. After Putin became president, his friend, businessman Nikolai Shamalov (who, along with Putin, was a co-founder of the Ozero cooperative) came to the company. Shamalov "offered a number of prospects" on the condition that 35% of the income be transferred to foreign accounts. In 2005, Kolesnikov, on Shamalov's instructions, created the company "Rosinvest", whose ownership structure was hidden behind anonymous "bearer shares", but the main part of the shares was managed in Putin's interests. One of Rosinvest's projects, personally supervised by Shamalov, was the construction of "Putin's palace". In the documents, Shamalov was listed as the owner of the palace under construction, and of the high-ranking officials, only the name of Vladimir Kozhin, who at the time held the post of head of the Presidential Property Management Department, appeared in the documents. In 2005, the design of the palace began, and in 2007, this project was combined with a project to create vineyards and produce elite wine. The combined project was named "Project South". Kolesnikov claimed that during the 2008 financial crisis, Putin ordered Shamalov to suspend all other projects and focus on "Project South". When Kolesnikov last saw the project documents and estimates in October 2009, the construction costs were approximately US$1 billion.

A 2014 journalistic investigation conducted by the Reuters agency confirmed the existence of corrupt financing schemes for the construction of "Putin's palace". Reuters journalists found that part of the funds allocated in 2005 for the National Project "Health" went to the construction of the palace. According to the investigation, two "wealthy individuals" from Putin's circle (Petromed owner Dmitry Gorelov and Nikolai Shamalov) were involved in scams involving the supply of tomographs and other medical equipment to Russian hospitals at prices inflated by two to three times and were never punished for it. They sold medical equipment for at least 195 million US dollars and, as shown by bank documents studied by Reuters, transferred 84 million dollars to accounts in Swiss banks. Reuters found that at least 35 million euros from these accounts were transferred to the account of a company involved in the construction of "Putin's palace".

In 2009, all facilities and land under "Project South" were transferred to the ownership of the private company "Indokopas", which was owned by Shamalov. Nevertheless, despite the allegedly private nature of the project, the palace construction was carried out by Spetsstroy, and the project was supervised, guarded, and all design requirements were issued by the Federal Protective Service (FSO).

In 2005–2010, funds were allocated from the state budget for the construction of a mountain road, a power line, and a special gas pipeline leading to the residence. According to Kolesnikov, to conceal the cost, quantity, and nomenclature of the supplied materials, Shamalov decided to import them, bypassing proper customs clearance procedures, paying with cash or from offshore accounts.

=== Resale to Ponomarenko ===
After media scandals, the residence, along with its owner "Indokopas", was resold by Nikolai Shamalov at a reduced price to Alexander Ponomarenko, co-owner of the Novorossiysk Commercial Sea Port. According to Sergey Kolesnikov, Vladimir Putin remained the real owner of this offshore company. Ponomarenko paid the formal owners of the palace only about 10 million rubles, and after the sale, their controlled companies continued to manage the residence.

In the autumn of 2011, Alexander Ponomarenko began leasing several facilities within the complex: a service house, an administrative building, and rooms in the main house. The total area of the leased premises was about 7,700 m², and the rental price reached a record 35 million rubles per month. The lessee was the Federal Agency for Special Construction. According to Ponomarenko, he exited the project in March 2016.

=== Mold infestation (2017–2018) ===
In February 2021, BBC News Russian published an anonymous interview with several employees who had worked at the residence at different times. According to them, in 2017–2018, mold appeared in the palace, affecting the entire building—both rooms and basement areas, mainly on the walls and ceilings. According to the workers, the palace's finishing was done using false walls: metal guides were attached to the concrete wall, which was covered with plaster, and these were then sheathed with drywall sheets, onto which the expensive finishing was applied. Mold filled the space between the false wall and the main wall and was discovered when a piece of plaster fell off near the pool (according to another version, part of the false wall was opened for cosmetic repairs).

According to the workers' assumption, the mold appeared due to high humidity and the lack of a proper ventilation system. This version was also considered plausible by the building's architect, Lanfranco Cirillo, in a conversation with the BBC. According to other versions, the cause could have been poor basement waterproofing and water ingress from the outside.

The mold infestation led to the building being taken out of service and undergoing a large-scale reconstruction. According to the employees, by the autumn of 2018, the dismantling work had been ongoing for about six months, during which the building was already devoid of furniture, but the decorative finishing of the walls and ceilings had not yet been removed. Later, all the interior finishing (plaster molding and panels of precious wood and stone) was dismantled and removed. By the beginning of 2021, according to several employees, the roof, windows, and external cladding of the building had already been replaced.

=== Rotenberg's statement (2021) ===
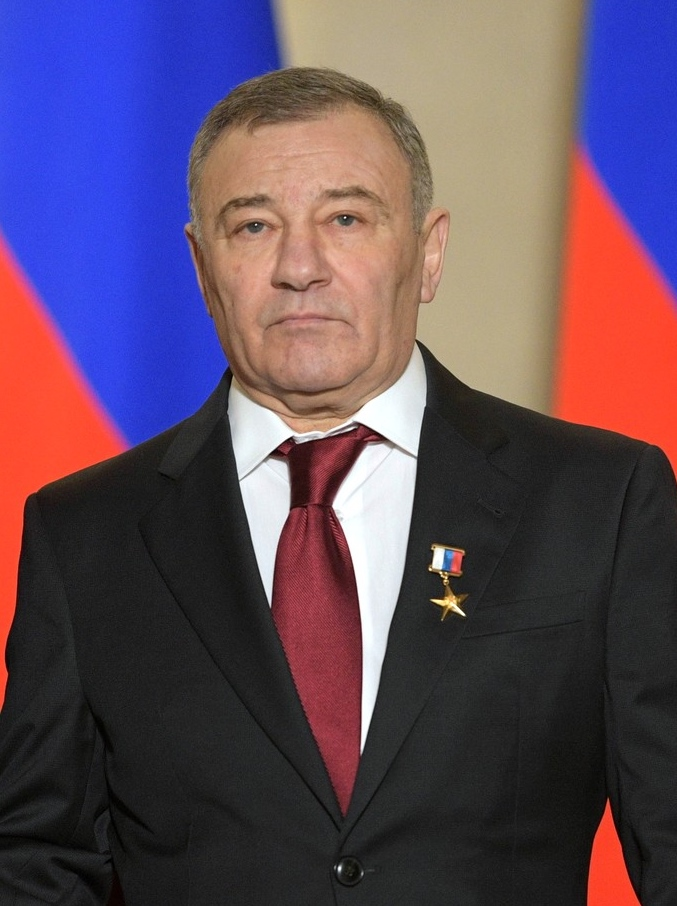
Arkady Rotenberg

On 30 January 2021, the online publication Mash published an interview with Russian entrepreneur and close friend of Vladimir Putin, Arkady Rotenberg, who declared himself the owner of the residence, calling it an unfinished aparthotel construction. Rotenberg stated that he "managed to become a beneficiary" of the facility "a few years ago" and decided to disclose the deal after a scandal erupted around the building.

Economist and sociologist Vladislav Inozemtsev called Rotenberg's statement "ridiculous and unconvincing". Inozemtsev believes that the presence of state security and a no-fly zone indicates that the facility actually belongs to the highest officials of Russia. It does not matter who owns the palace on paper. Inozemtsev is confident that the facility does not belong to Arkady Rotenberg even formally, since no documents were presented. Journalists from the online publication "Meduza" found that it is very difficult to confirm Rotenberg's ownership through documents. The residence is owned by the St. Petersburg firm "Binom". According to SPARK, the firm was formally established by Alexander Ponomarenko, and its owners are unnamed Russian citizens. Ponomarenko, however, stated that he had no relation to the residence since 2016. At the same time, "Binom" is connected to a group of companies which, in turn, are linked to Y. Kovalchuk. The journalists note that Kovalchuk may also be connected with the purchase for 1.2 billion rubles of another residence, presumably for Putin, — Brezhnev's dacha "Glitsiniya" in Crimea.

Workers who had been in the palace told the BBC that the aparthotel was a new concept they only learned about from the news of Rotenberg's statements, whose name they had not heard in connection with the palace before. According to them, the palace served a different function: it was no secret to any of them that they were working at "Putin's palace". At the same time, one of the workers who visited the site in 2020 reported that partitions for bathrooms, like in hotel rooms, were being installed in almost all rooms.

== Ownership ==
Russian government official Vladimir Kozhin told reporters from the Russian daily Kommersant that the Russian government had approved the construction of the estate by the Lirus group, and that the government maintained a stake in the project until 2008, when it sold its share.

In March 2011, it was reported that Alexander Ponomarenko, a businessman and billionaire who made his money in sea ports, banking, commercial real estate and airport construction, acquired the company "Idokopas" which owned the palace. At the time of the purchase, Idokopas owned around 67 hectares of recreational land near the settlement of Praskoveyeka, including a guesthouse complex amounting to 26,000 square meters.

Ponomarenko said he had bought a second company, the Azure Berry Company (Russian: «Лазурная ягода»), which owned 60 hectares of agricultural land near Divnomorsk, a settlement 13 kilometers from Praskoveyevka. Ponomarenko bought the unfinished complex from Shamalov and his partners. At the time of the purchase, Ponomarenko did not disclose the value of the deal, but hinted he had been able to purchase the property for a very good price – the asset was heavily encumbered with debts and the developers had run out of money to complete the project.

When asked about the projected value of the complex once complete, he conceded that suggestions it could be as much as $350 million "were close to the truth". According to Vedomosti, experts estimated the value of the property at $20 million. In July 2011, the Azure Berry Company was sold to SVL Group, controlled by Boris Titov, the owner of sparkling wine factory "Abrau-Durso". Ponomarenko's media representatives told Forbes in 2021 that Ponomarenko had withdrawn from the project in 2016.

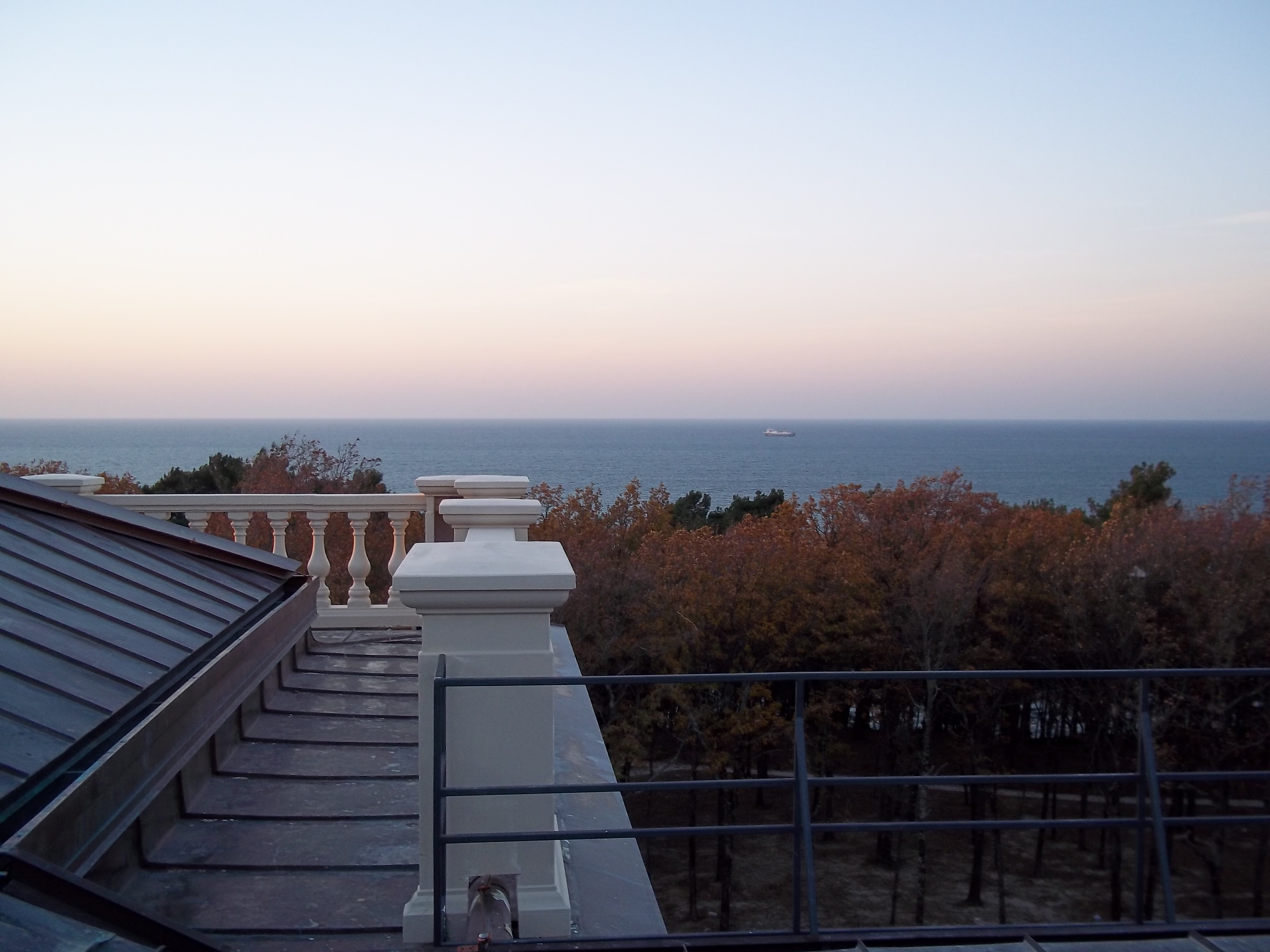
A view of the Black Sea from the palace

On 11 May 2016, RBC reported that Alexei Vasilyuk (Russian: Алексей Василюк), through his ownership of the Moscow registered LLC “Southern citadel” (Russian: ООО «Южная цитадель»), has exclusive rights since 25 March 2016 to the water along the coastline between Cape Idokopas and Divnomorskoye for the production of mussels and oysters and that on 20 April 2016 “Southern citadel” has received a 25-year lease to two land plots totaling 422.1 hectares (1,043 acres) along the Black Sea next to “Putin's Palace”.

The RBC article stated that Ponomarenko is the owner of “Putin's Palace” through his Complex LLC (Russian: ООО «Комплекс») which is the owner of the land under “Putin's Palace” since May 2013 and the owner of the structure “Putin's Palace” since March 2015 and that the British Virgin Islands firm Savoyan Investments Limited has been the owner of Complex LLC since September 2013.

According to a 13 May 2016 The Moscow Times article, the exclusive ownership of the nearby coastline is to prevent ships from approaching the coastline near “Putin's Palace”. On 3 March 2017, Alexander Ponomarenko obtained a 100% stake in “South Citadel” and obtained an additional two plots of land next to “Putin's Palace” and had the exclusive rights to the water along the coastline near “Putin's Palace”.

On 30 January 2021, the billionaire Arkady Rotenberg, who has close links to Putin, said that he had purchased the estate "a few years ago." He also said that the property when completed would become an apartment hotel.

== Corruption claims ==
=== Kolesnikov letter ===
In 2010, Russian businessman Sergei Kolesnikov wrote an open letter to Dmitry Medvedev, at that time the Russian President, stating that a dentist named Nikolai Shamalov was building a grand Black Sea estate for Putin or Medvedev. Kolesnikov said the construction of the estate was draining funds available for his work, which included the state-commissioned renovations of hospitals in collaboration with Shamalov and businessman Dmitry Gorelov. Kolesnikov further said that he had worked on the estate project until he was removed because he voiced concerns about corruption, that the estate was still under construction, and the cost was one billion dollars, funded by bribery and theft.

In 2011, the Novaya Gazeta wrote that it had obtained a contract for the palace signed by the presidential property manager in 2005, when Putin was the Russian president. A website called the "Russian Wikileaks," RuLeaks.Ru, posted photographs of the estate, but could not confirm its ownership. Medvedev replied that neither he nor Putin had any relationship to the property.

Speaking to the BBC in 2012, Kolesnikov said that the estate was still under construction, and that the project was being organized sometimes by Shamalov, or sometimes by a deputy of the president, Igor Sechin. Kolesnikov said that Shamalov never questioned his role, adding, "There was a tsar - and there were slaves, who didn't have their own opinion." According to the BBC, the estate was owned by a company Shamalov partly owned, and it was unclear if Putin had any relationship to the property.

=== Financing claims ===
A chart of the interactions between companies and cash flows involved in financing the construction of "Putin's Palace"

In Kolesnikov's initial letter and in subsequent media interviews, including to Novaya Gazeta, David Ignatius of The Washington Post, and Masha Gessen of Snob.ru, Kolesnikov provided an account of how the construction of the estate was financed by corruption. Kolesnikov said that in early 2000, Nikolai Terentievich Shamalov, a representative of the multinational company Siemens AG in North West Russia and somebody thought close to Russia's new President Vladimir Putin, approached Kolesnikov with a business proposition.

The two men had known each other through business since 1993–1994, when Kolesnikov was deputy director general of Petromed, a St. Petersburg-based firm that specialised in the procurement of medical supplies. It was also through Petromed that Kolesnikov had gotten to know Putin, on whose behalf Shamalov said he made the approach. Putin had been head of the St. Petersburg Council on External Economic affairs, which held a 51% stake when Petromed became a private company in 1992.

Kolesnikov told Masha Gessen that Putin held 94% of shares in Rosinvest, with Kolesnikov, Shamalov, and Dmitry Vladimirovich Gorelov (director of Petromed and another friend of Putin from his time in Saint Petersburg) taking 2% each. Rosinvest's interests included shipbuilding, construction, and lumber/timber processing. Kolesnikov is reported as saying that Roman Abramovich and the other donors to health projects acted 'nobly', implying they were unaware that a significant proportion of their donations was being diverted into an investment vehicle allegedly run for the benefit of the President and his partners in Rosinvest. This is despite the huge sums involved and disputed claims that the relationship between Putin and Abramovich has been very close.

The chart above shows the scheme of interaction between companies and cash flows involved in financing of the construction, according to Kolesnikov.

== Investigations ==
In February 2011, members of the group "Environmental Watch for the North Caucasus" and a journalist visited the site to investigate concerns that the construction violated laws protecting the area's ecology. They said that they were harassed and detained by members of the Federal Protective Service (FSO), the agency responsible for guarding state property and high-ranking officials.

Despite the confiscation of their equipment they were able to publish additional photographs of the site. Activists made another sortie into the property in June 2011, when they claimed to have found an illegally constructed marina.

=== Metro Style ===
Metro Style (Russian: «Метро-Стиль») published diagrams of its underground tunnel system.

=== RBC investigation ===
The 11 May 2016 RBC article "Oyster farming will begin in front of the "Putin's palace" near Gelendzhik" (Russian: Напротив «дворца Путина» под Геленджиком начнут разводить устриц) revealed that Ponomarenko is the owner of "Putin's Palace". The publishing of the RBC article contributed to the firing by Mikhail Prokhorov, who has the majority ownership of the RBK Group after he purchased a 51% stake in it in 2009, of Maxim Solus, the editor-in-chief of RBC newspaper, which further resulted in the resignations of both Roman Badanin, rbc.ru's chief editor, and Yelizaveta Osetinskaya, RBC's chief editor.

=== FBK investigation ===
External videos
- "Дворец для Путина. История самой большой взятки" (A Palace for Putin: The Story of the Biggest Bribe) with English subtitles

On 19 January 2021, two days after Alexei Navalny was detained by Russian authorities upon his return to Russia, an investigation by him and his Anti-Corruption Foundation (FBK) was published accusing President Vladimir Putin of using fraudulently obtained funds to build the estate for himself in what he called "the world's biggest bribe." Navalny said that the estate is 39 times the size of Monaco and cost over 100 billion rubles ($1.35 billion) to construct. His video showed aerial footage of the estate via a drone and a detailed floorplan of the palace that Navalny said was given by a contractor, which he compared to photographs from inside the palace that were leaked onto the Internet in 2011. He also detailed an elaborate corruption scheme allegedly involving Putin's inner circle that allowed Putin to hide billions of dollars to build the estate.

After Navalny's arrest and the release of his video, protests in support of Navalny began on 23 January 2021. In response to the claims, Putin said that the palace had never belonged either to him or his family.

The BBC Russian Service spoke to several construction workers who said they worked on the palace between 2005 and 2020, confirming several of the allegations made in the FBK investigation, including that the palace was being rebuilt due to mould.

In January 2022, the FBK leaked 479 photographs of the palace while it was under construction. The photographs show the exterior and interior of the house including photographs of rooms that were described as a strip club and a hookah lounge.

=== Meduza investigation ===
Journalists from the online newspaper Meduza interviewed people who were involved in the construction of the residence. Many interviewees said the residence is connected with Putin and is guarded by the FSO, who also supervise construction. Meduza had documents with the names and signatures of the FSO employees, including Colonel Oleg Kuznetsov. The article described vast and extravagant luxuries in the estate.

=== Mash channel ===
On 29 January 2021, the pro-Kremlin Mash Telegram channel gained access to the palace, which showed that the palace was under construction. While it attempted to contradict Navalny's claims, Navalny's team said that it supported their previous reporting that the palace had to be redone due to mould issues.

=== BBC investigation ===
On 13 May 2021, BBC News Russian published its own investigation based on official documents of the sale and meeting notes.

== Gallery ==
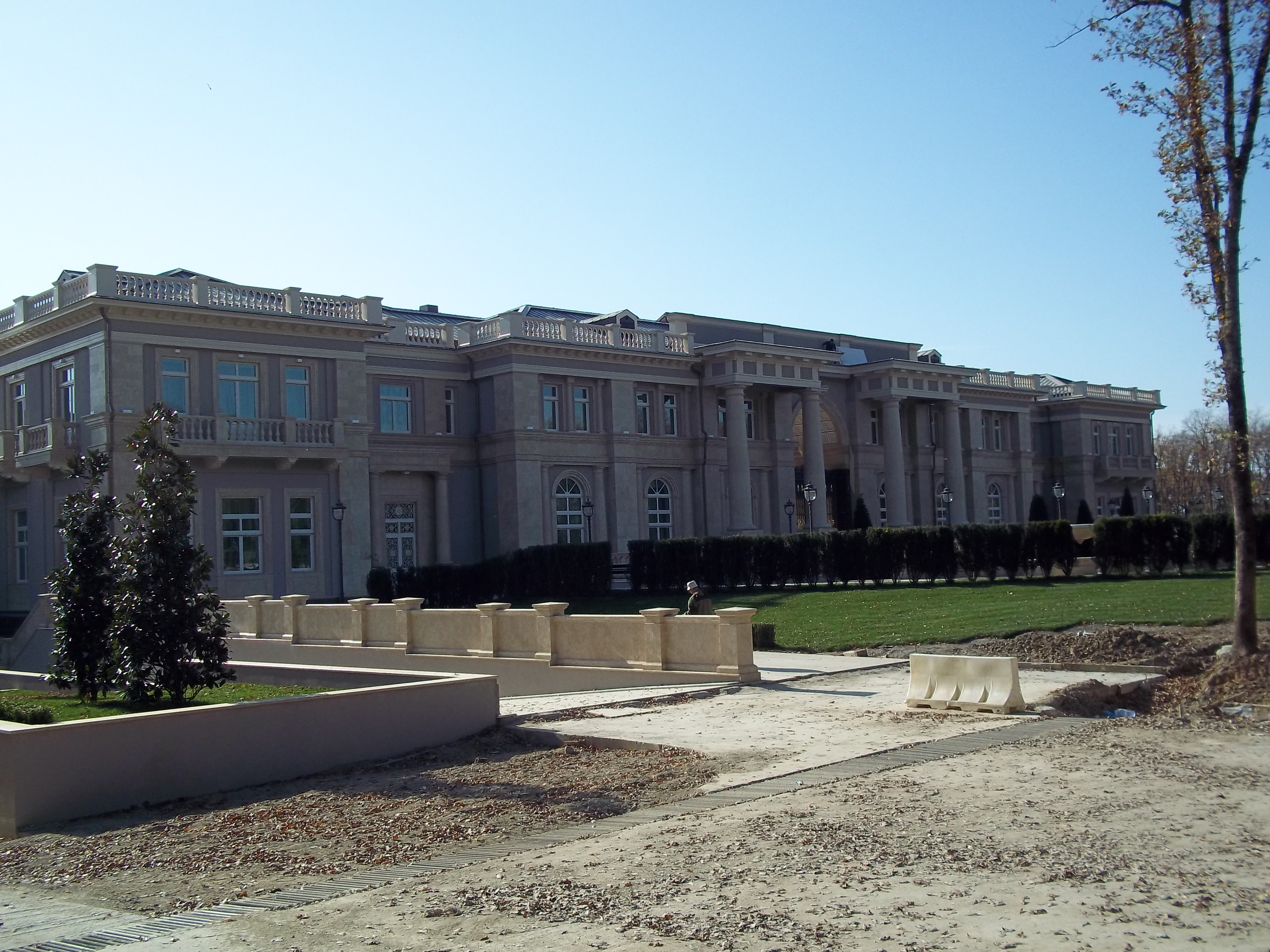
Exterior, November 2010

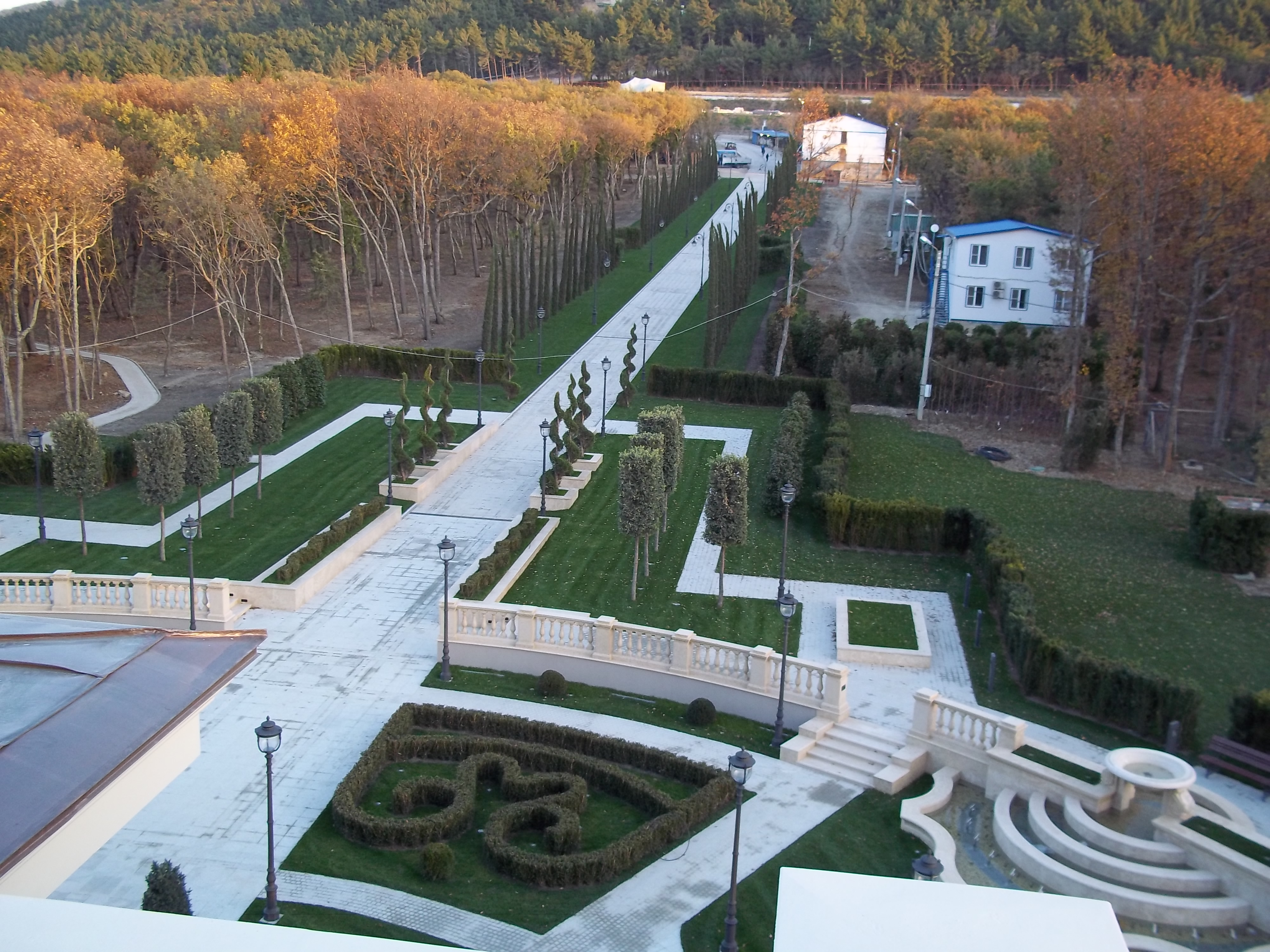
Gardens

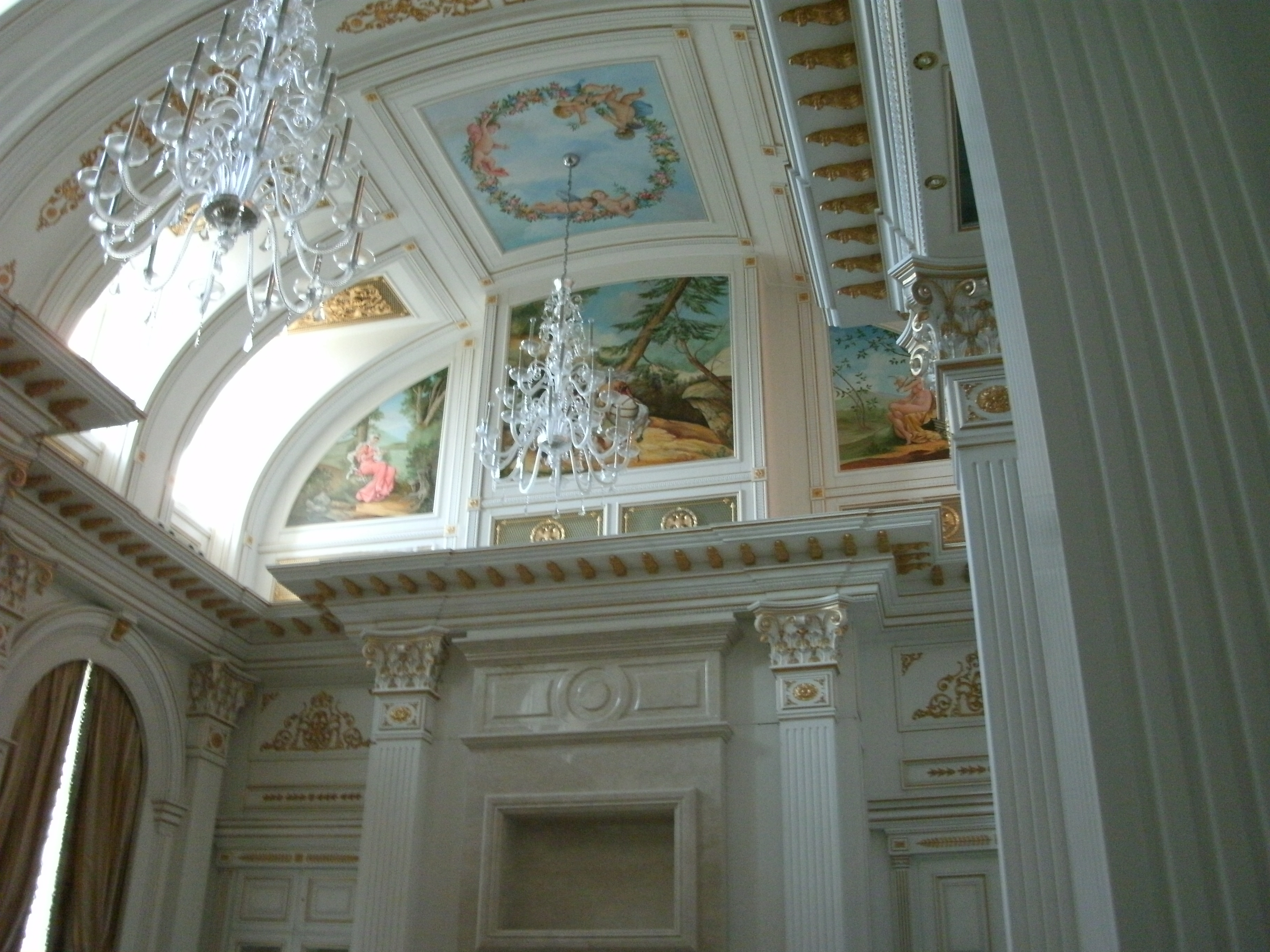
Main hall

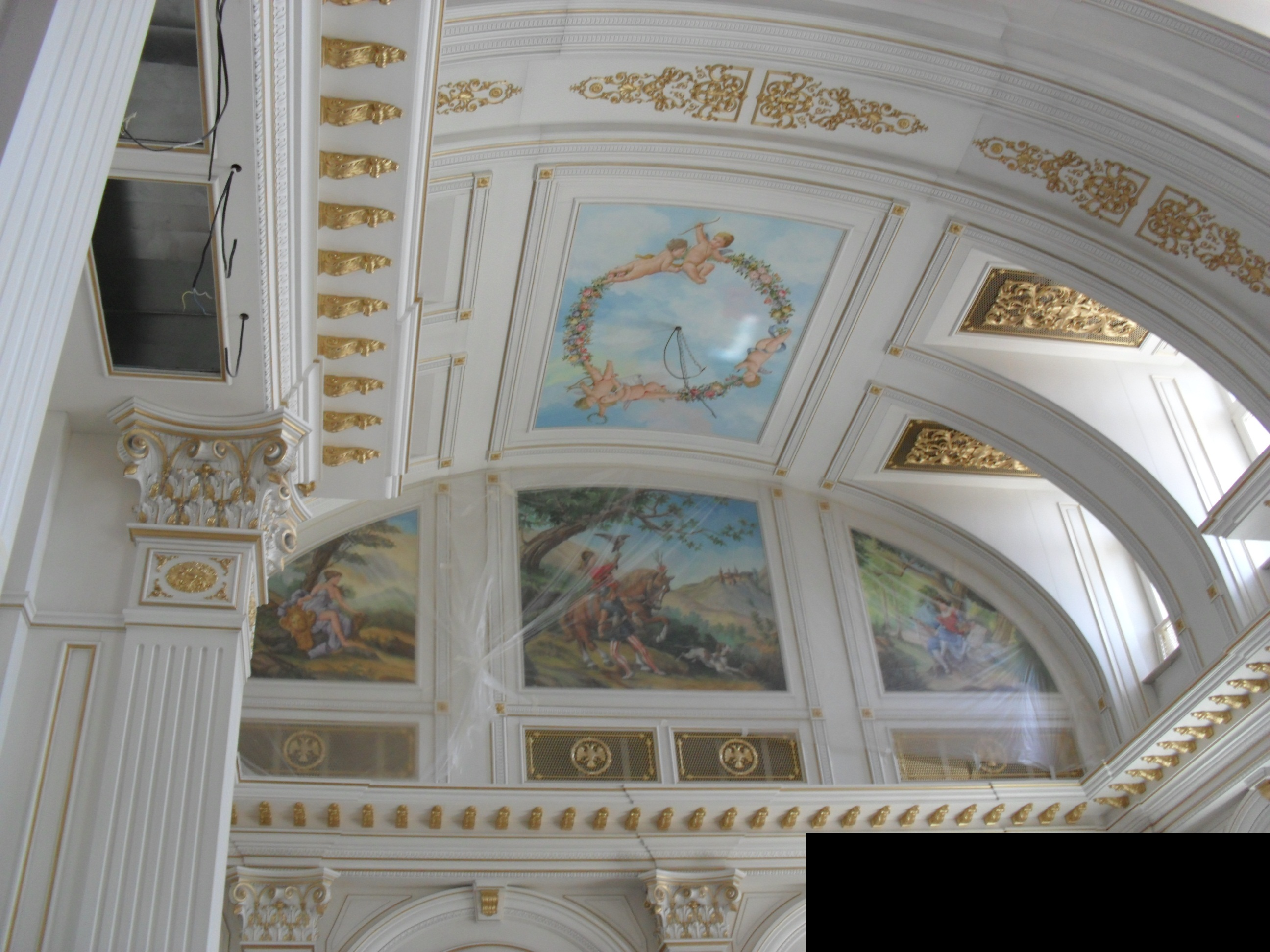
Main hall

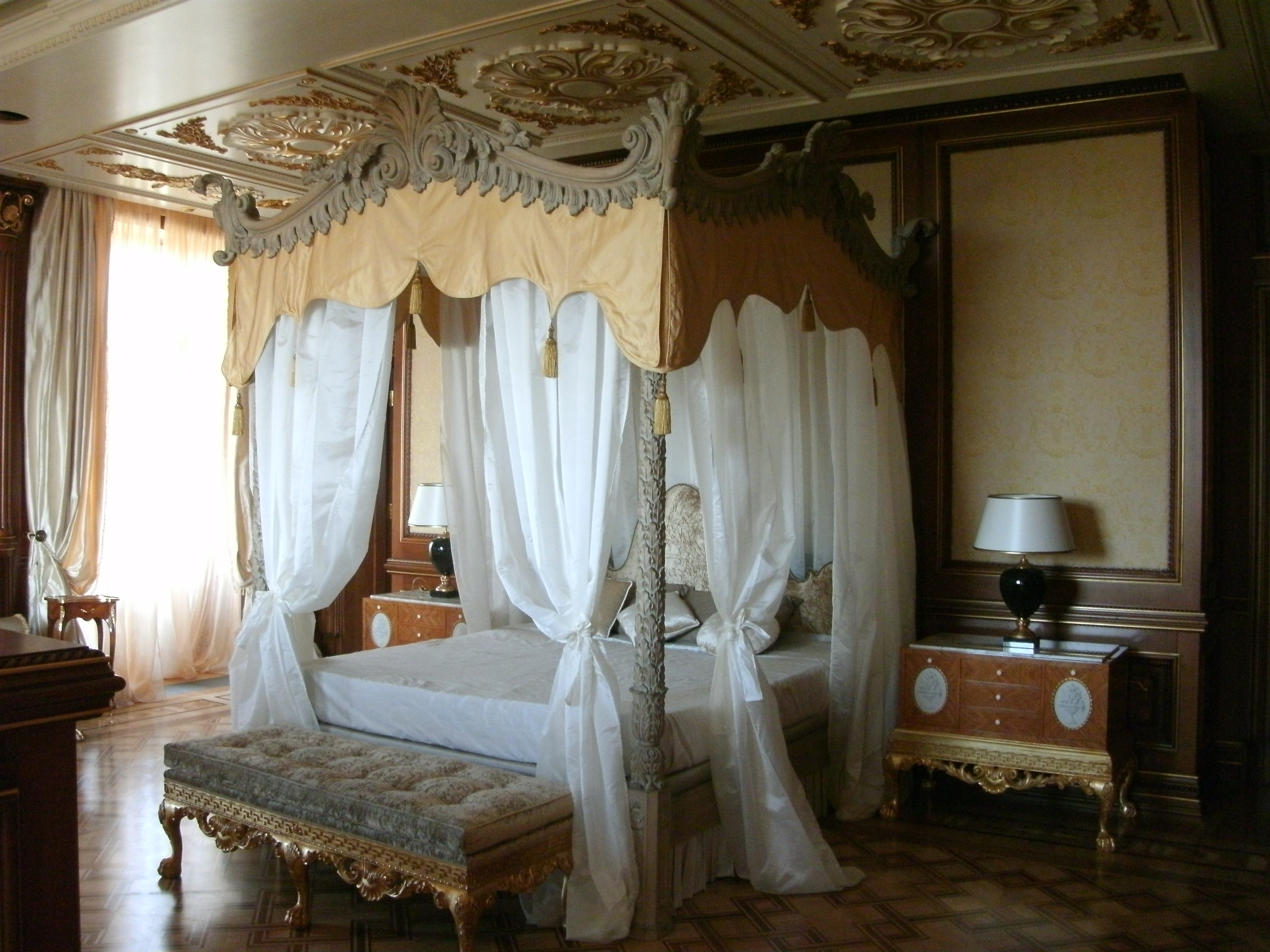
One of the bedrooms

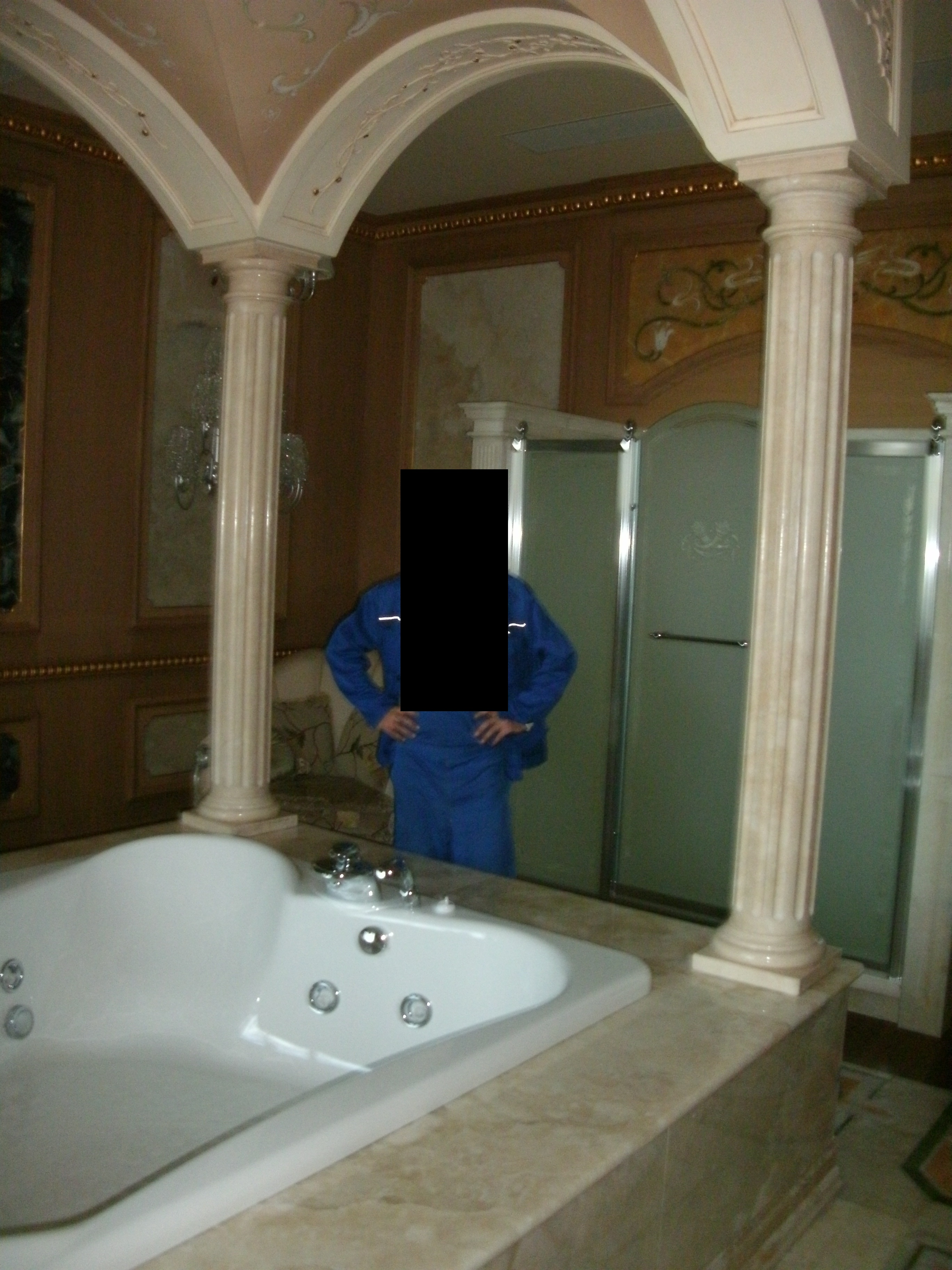
One of the bathrooms

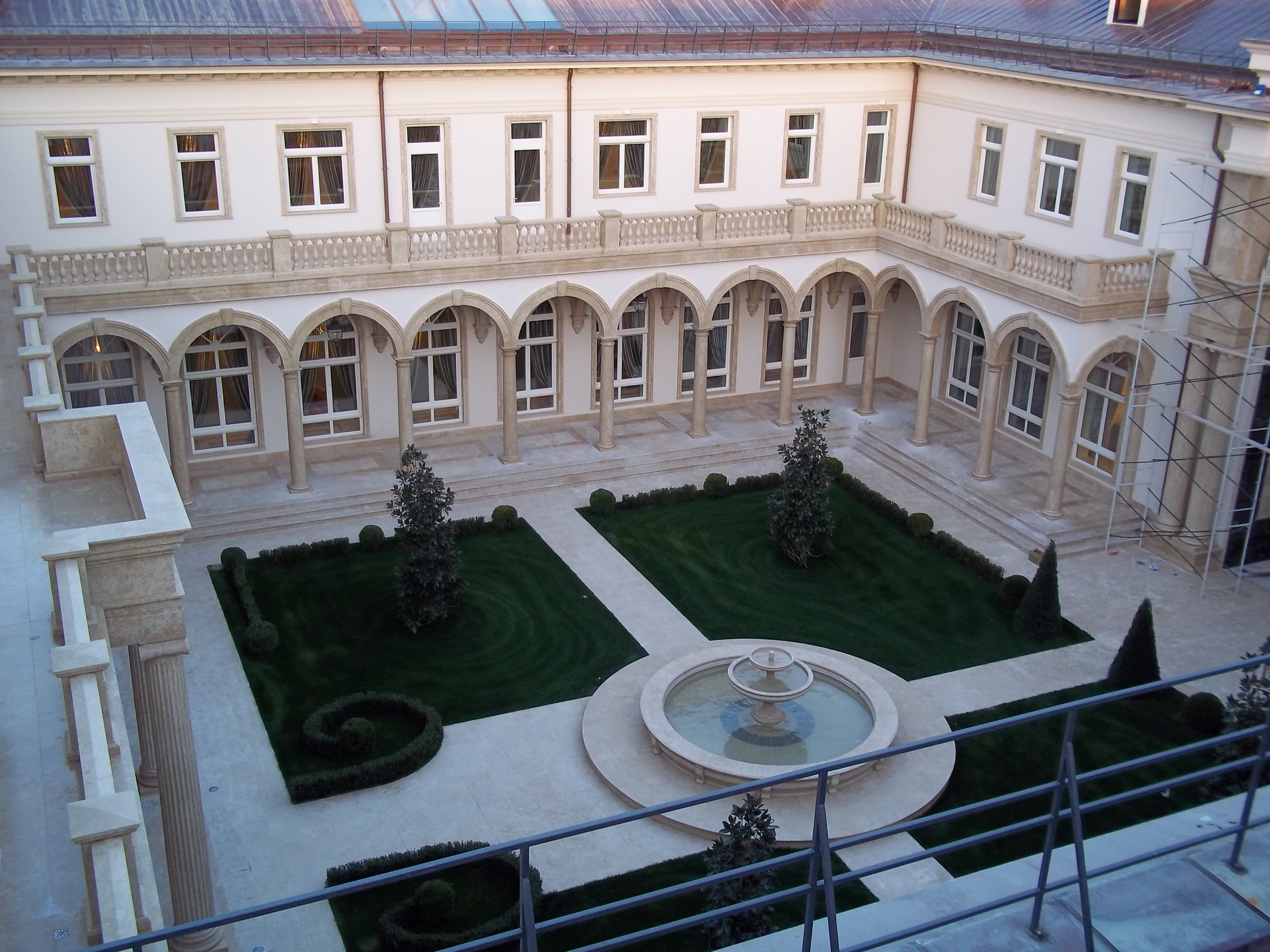
Courtyard (Curtains and chandeliers are visible in all windows.)

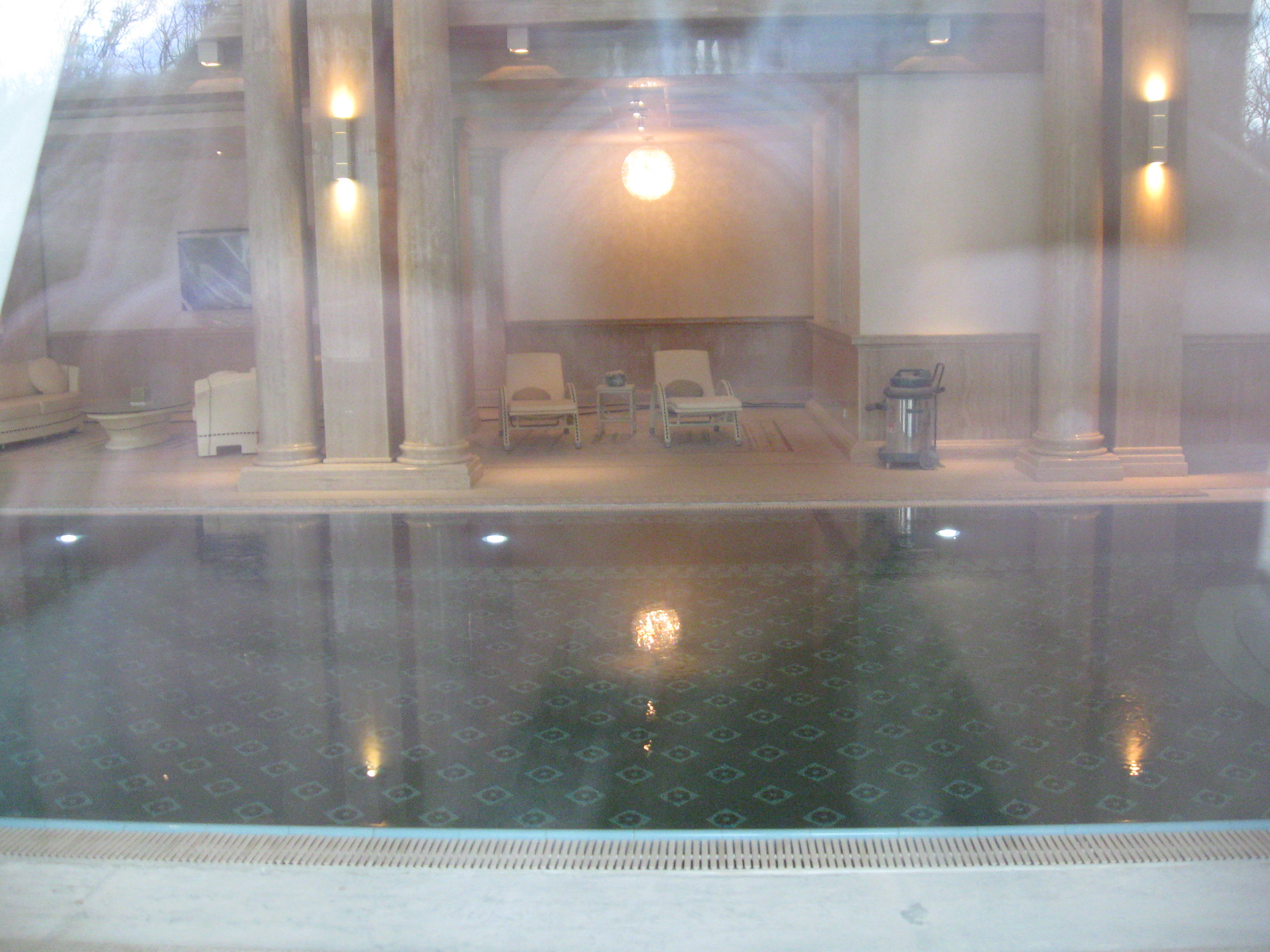
Swimming pool near the aqua-discotheque

== See also ==
- 2021 Russian protests
- Dolgiye Borody, a residence of the president of the Russian Federation.
- Grandpa in his bunker, an insulting nickname for Russian president Vladimir Putin, referring to his Palace.
- Hatvanpuszta, Hungarian estate and country houses tied to the family of Hungary’s Prime Minister, Viktor Orbán
- Mezhyhirya Residence, the residence of Viktor Yanukovych, former Prime Minister and President of Ukraine
- Millerhof
- Novo-Ogaryovo, the official residence of the President of Russia
