= Nikolay Abroskin =

Russian general

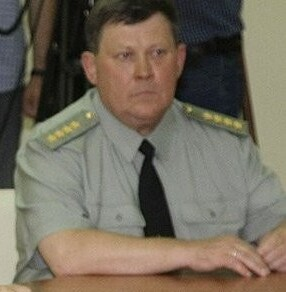
- Born: 1 January 1951 (age 75); Armievo, Penza Oblast, RSFSR
- Education: Mordovian State University
- Military career
- Allegiance: Soviet Union, Russia
- Branch: Armed Forces of the Russian Federation
- Service years: 1973-2010
- Rank: Army general
- Unit: Construction Troops
- Awards: Order "For Merit to the Fatherland", Order "For Service to the Homeland in the Armed Forces of the USSR", Medal "For Impeccable Service", Medal "In Commemoration of the 850th Anniversary of Moscow", Medal "In Commemoration of the 300th Anniversary of Saint Petersburg", Medal "In Commemoration of the 1000th Anniversary of Kazan", Medal for Services in Conducting the Population Census, Jubilee Medal "60 Years of the Armed Forces of the USSR", Jubilee Medal "70 Years of the Armed Forces of the USSR", Medal of Stolypin

Nikolay Pavlovich Abroskin (born January 1, 1951, in Armievo village, Penza Oblast) is a Soviet and Russian military and government official, former Russian Army General (2003), and a candidate of technical sciences. He served as the Director of the Federal Agency for Special Construction (2004–2011) and the First Deputy Head of the Presidential Affairs Office of the Russian Federation (2015–2020).

== Biography ==
Nikolay Abroskin was born on January 1, 1951, in Armievo village, Shemysheisky District of Penza Oblast.

After graduating from the N.P. Ogarev Mordovian State University and its military department in 1973, he was called to military service and served in the construction units of the Main Directorate for Special Construction (Glavspetsstroy) under the Ministry of Assembly and Special Construction Works of the USSR. His first officer position was the deputy commander of a platoon in the 841st military construction detachment. He then became the secretary of the Komsomol committee in the 167th military construction administration (167 MCA).

In 1981, he graduated from the Moscow Oblast Correspondence Construction Technical School.

In 1980, he was appointed as the senior assistant and deputy chief of the personnel department of the 167 MCA. In 1981 (according to other sources, in 1980), he became the senior officer in the personnel management department of Glavspetsstroy. In 1983, he was promoted to the position of deputy chief, and in 1987, he became the chief of the personnel management department of Glavspetsstroy.

From July 1992, he served as the deputy chief of the Main Directorate for Special Construction of the Russian Federation, and from December 1992, he held the position of the deputy chief of the Federal Directorate for Special Construction under the Government of the Russian Federation (FUSC Russia). Since 1996, he served as the First Deputy Chief of FUSC Russia. He became a member of the Collegium of the Main Directorate for Special Construction of the Russian Federation in January 1992. He was promoted to Lieutenant General on June 9, 1993.

In June 1997, the Federal Service for Special Construction of Russia (Rosspetsstroy) was established based on FUSC Russia, and Nikolay Abroskin was appointed as the First Deputy Head of Rosspetsstroy. However, by the decree of the President of Russia dated April 30, 1998, this federal service was abolished. Abroskin continued to hold the position of the First Deputy Head and chaired the liquidation commission of the abolished Rosspetsstroy.

On March 2, 1999, he was appointed as the head of the Federal Directorate for Special Construction (Spetsstroy Russia), which was recreated on February 4, 1999, under the State Committee of the Russian Federation for Construction, Architecture, and Housing Policy (Gosstroi Russia). He also served as a member of the Collegium of the State Committee of the Russian Federation for Construction, Architecture, and Housing Policy from February 1999 to March 2002. In August 1999, the Federal Directorate for Special Construction under Gosstroi Russia was transformed into the Federal Agency for Special Construction under the Government of the Russian Federation (Spetsstroy Russia).

He was involved in a criminal case initiated by the Main Military Prosecutor's Office under Article 285 of the Criminal Code of the Russian Federation (abuse of office) in connection with the embezzlement of budget funds during the construction of facilities by Spetsstroy Russia. The investigation concluded that Abroskin had misappropriated a significant amount of money through fraudulent schemes and abuse of his position.

In 2004, Nikolay Abroskin was appointed as the Director of the Federal Agency for Special Construction (Spetsstroy Russia). During his tenure, he oversaw the construction and maintenance of various strategic facilities and infrastructure projects in Russia. However, his time in this position was marred by allegations of corruption and embezzlement.

In 2011, Abroskin was removed from his position as the Director of Spetsstroy Russia due to the ongoing investigation into his alleged involvement in corruption. The investigation revealed a complex network of illicit financial transactions and fraudulent practices. Abroskin was accused of using his authority to manipulate contracts, inflate project costs, and siphon off funds for personal gain.

Despite the charges against him, Abroskin managed to avoid prosecution for several years. However, in 2015, he faced renewed scrutiny when he was appointed as the First Deputy Head of the Presidential Affairs Office of the Russian Federation. This appointment drew criticism from anti-corruption activists and raised concerns about the government's commitment to combating corruption.

In 2020, Abroskin's tenure in the Presidential Affairs Office came to an end. The specific circumstances surrounding his departure from the position are not widely known. Since then, there has been limited information available about his current activities or any legal proceedings related to the corruption charges.
