= Life.ru =

Russian pro-government news website

Life
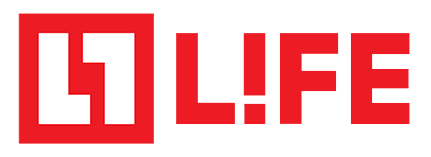
- Life logo since 2016
- Country: Russia
- Headquarters: Moscow, Russia

Programming
- Language: Russian
- Picture format: 16:9 SDTV, HDTV

Ownership
- Owner: News Media Holding

History
- Launched: 2 September 2013
- Closed: 18 August 2017

Links
- Website: life.ru

Life.ru
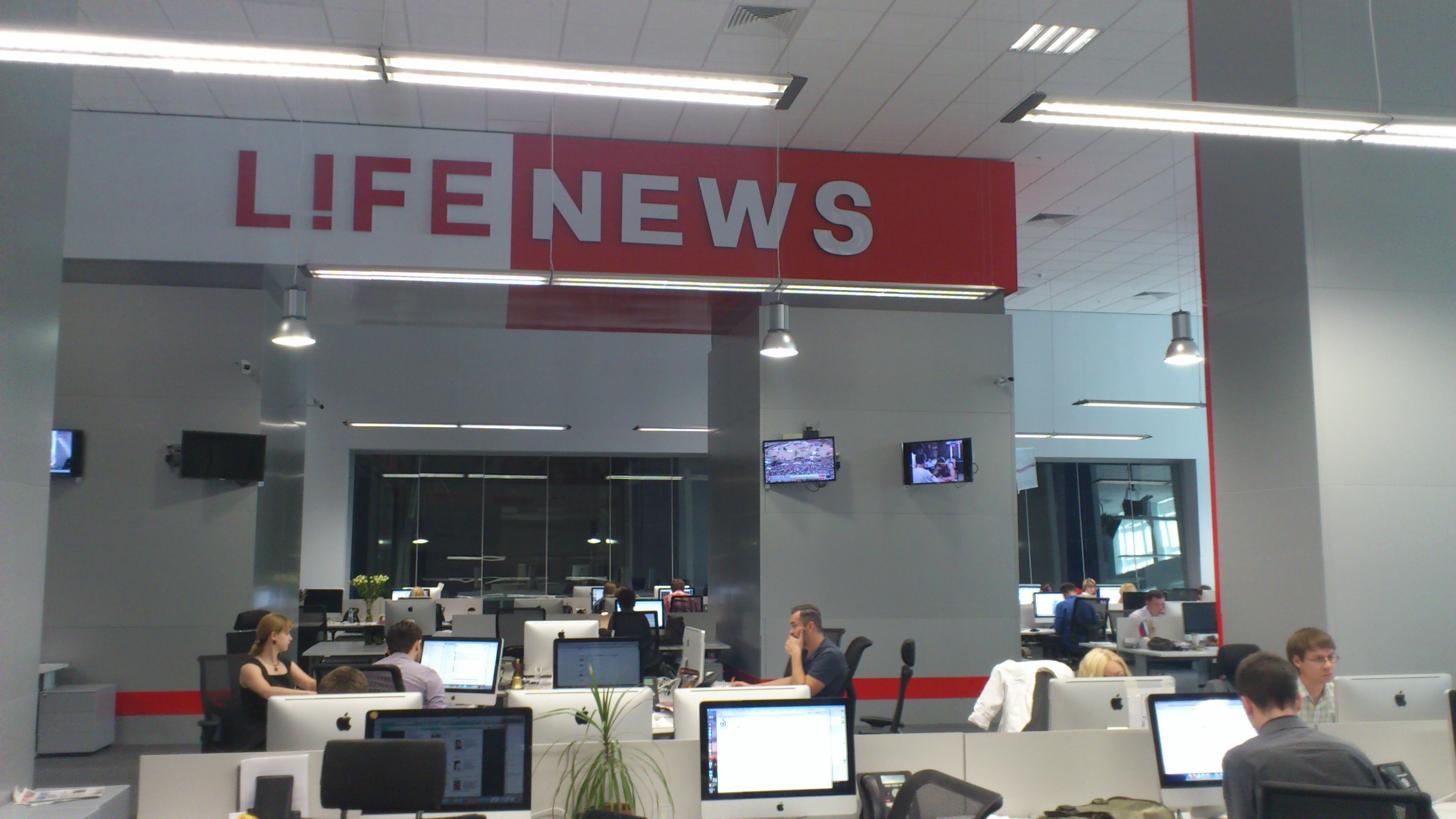
- Life newsdesk
- Website type: News
- Available in: Russian
- Website: life.ru
- Launched: September 2009
- Current status: active

Life (stylized as L!FE, formerly LifeNews) is a Russian pro-government news website owned by Aram Gabrelyanov and published by News Media Holding. Its offices are in Moscow. The brand is most commonly associated with the now-defunct LifeNews channel.

== Life News ==
The television channel LifeNews and its mobile application were launched in September 2013. The broadcasting licensee for the television channel was Media Content LLC, whose beneficiaries were Aram Gabrelyanov and the oil merchant "Surgutex". According to the open statistics of LiveInternet, the daily audience of the LifeNews online informational publication in 2013 was 200-250 thousand viewers.

LifeNews came to prominence by actively covering events in Donbas in 2014, taking a strong pro-Kremlin position. The channel would see its ratings rise through 2014, to a peak of up to 30 million. On July 1, 2014, LifeNews TV channel broadcast digitally in the Republic of Crimea and Sevastopol as a part of the third (regional) multiplex. Notable journalists at the channel included Semen Pegov, who would go on to found the War Gonzo project.

The nascent channel found itself the centre of a scandal in July 2014, after they reported in a positive tone that the anti-Ukraine 'rebels' in east Ukraine had shot down a Ukrainian military jet. The jet soon turned out to be a civilian passenger jet, MH17, and LifeNews quickly moved to delete, and erase their initial report, and then produce further reports blaming Ukraine for the fatal shootdown.

The channel continued broadcasting as usual, but after the MH17 scandal, had taken a reputational hit, in Russia, and internationally. In September 2014 Ukraine's National Council of Television banned 15 Kremlin-run channels, including LifeNews, for what they claimed was war propaganda.

On December 17, 2014, LifeNews Editor-in-Chief Anatoly Suleymanov confirmed large-scale redundancies by January 1, 2015, due to restructuring by the News Media holding company. In 2015, News Media cut around 15 to 17 percent of the employees of LifeNews.

In late 2016, LifeNews announced that they were removing journalists from their transmissions, and switching to a 'streaming' format. On August 18, 2017, the channel announced its closure, and stopped broadcasting. According to the strategy of the holding company News Media, they would in future focus on extended streaming on the Internet and social networks, to replace 'outmoded' TV broadcasting. As such, LifeNews is defunct.

=== Internet publication Life.ru ===
In 2009 the internet publication of LifeNews.ru was launched. At the same time the projects LifeSports and LifeShowbiz of the news media holding company were launched, which were both closed in 2016. Life.ru News Media, which controlled the domain of Life.ru, had the following owners: 75% of shares was owned by a closed fund "Media+", which was associated with the "National Media Group" (NMG), businessman Yuri Kovalchuk, who is close to Russian President Vladimir Putin. 25% was controlled by General Director Aram Gabrelyanov. In 2018 Gabrelyanov announced his retirement from life.ru; according to Meduza and project publications because of a tense relationship with First Deputy Presidential Administration Alexei Gromov and the NMG management.

In 2016 LifeNews.ru was renamed as life.ru and was planned as Russian equivalent of Buzzfeed.

The new project merged the former LifeNews and Super websites.

On September 17, 2018, Suleymanov and Life.ru editor-in-chief Alexander Potapov left the project, with Nikita Magutin (Mash) and Raul Smyr (LifeCorr) leaving at the same time. Aram Gabrelyanov returned to News Media as General Director, with Arseniy Hovhannisyan becoming the new Chief Editor of Life.ru, who previously held a similar position at Izvestia.

== Radio Life Sound ==
On July 1, 2013, Aram Gabrelyanov, the owner of Life, became the General Director of the radio station "Russian News Service" (RNS), which had been set up in 2001. On July 4, 2016, as part of the reorganization of the Life brand, RSN was renamed as Life Sound. On August 14, 2017, the radio station stopped broadcasting.

== Ownership ==
Life is owned by general director Aram Gabrelyanov. The Gabrelyanovs operate in different sectors of Russian life from showbusiness to the security services. According to an article in The Moscow Times an influence on their recent success has been loyalty to the Kremlin. "The father, Aram Gabrelyanov, refers to President Vladimir Putin as the "father of the nation". One of Putin's oldest friends spent $80 million to become a key shareholder in the Gabrelyanovs' holding company, News Media, providing it with a flood of cash for investment.'

== Criticism ==
LifeNews is notable for a servile attitude toward the Kremlin and a proximity to the Russian security services.

While broadcasting news about events during the 2014 pro-Russian unrest in Ukraine, LifeNews was derided for claiming to have found the business card of Dmytro Yarosh at the site of a battle in the Donbas. Ukrainians quickly created an internet meme called the Yarosh business card (Ukrainian: Визитка Яроша, romanized: Vyzytka Yarosha) and called the reporting "propaganda worse than that of Nazi Germany". When the number on the card was called, it reached an unaffiliated elderly woman, casting further doubts on the claims of LifeNews. In September 2014, the National Television Council of Ukraine banned 15 channels operated by the Kremlin for alleged war propaganda, including Life News. In September 2014, YouTube blocked the LifeNews video channel due to third-party complaints about copyright infringements.

In the wake of the Charlie Hebdo shooting in January 2015, it aired a piece from one of its regular contributors and 'expert political analysts' that said the terrorist attack had been carried out by the US against France in order to further an anti-Russian agenda. These claims were treated as little more than conspiracy theories meant to build pro-Putin support in American media.

According to the Security Service of Ukraine, it is a paramilitary organization. Andrew Levus, SBU, called members of the LifeNews channel "specific special operations combat units of information".

== Disinformation campaign ==
=== Famine in Switzerland ===
During the events of the Russian invasion of Ukraine and the stop of Russian gas flow to some European countries, the news portal published an article and a video by the Russian journalist Petrova living in Lausanne claiming Switzerland is preparing for a "winter of hunger". In the video the journalist states that the country could face running out of water and electricity in a couple of days and the suspension of public transport. As evidence she shows the information brochure "Kluger Rat – Notvorrat" by the "Federal Office for National Supply (BWL)" claiming that this was sent to the entire Swiss population. However the BWL rejects these claims stating that this brochure was printed years before and has nothing to do with the current winter. It also was never sent to the entire Swiss population. After the article was published the journalist published a statement denying the support of any disinformation campaign against Switzerland and that "she was a victim of Russian propaganda herself". She claims a former colleague asked her to make a video about the brochure and she didn't know that the video was released.

== Awards ==
- LifeNews television channel
  - 2013 Golden Ray (ru) (Russian national award among non-terrestrial thematic channels broadcast in Russia in Russian only by satellite, cable and Internet operators )— Television Channels: News and Political Journalism category
  - 2014 Big Digit — Business and News Channel category
