= Grigory Naginsky =

Russian engineer and politician

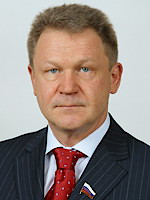
- Grigoriy Naginskiy
- Born: June 16, 1958 (age 68); Orsk, Orenburg Oblast, Russian SFSR, USSR
- Education: Ural State Technical University
- Occupation: politician
- Political party: United Russia
- Honours: Order of Courage

Grigory Mikhailovich Naginskiy (Russian: Григорий Михайлович Нагинский; born June 16, 1958, in Orsk, Orenburg Oblast) is a Russian politician, Candidate of Sciences. Senator – member of the Federation Council from Leningrad Oblast in 2003–2010, member of Industrial Policy Committee and Commission in natural monopolies.

== Biography ==
Naginskiy graduated from Ural Polytechnic University in 1980, with a specialization in Heat and Power Engineering. Additionally, he was a Candidate in Economic Sciences. He began his career in 1980 as an engineer in the Installation and Construction Directorate – 90 and continued his career up to the level of Deputy Chief Engineer. Following the accident at the Chernobyl nuclear power plant Naginskiy managed the remedial works for reactor 4.

Since 1994, Naginskiy has been deputy General Director of Installation and Construction Directorate – 90. In 1995 he initiated the integration of a range of enterprises of Sosnoviy Bor in a single holding, at the same year became the Board Chairman of Holding CONCERN TITAN-2. In 1996, he was appointed Vice President of Public Associations "Soyuz Chernobul — Sosnoviy Bor" and President of NNO "Federation of Judo in Sosnoviy Bor."

In 1999 he began to develop a political career and took various positions in different committees of the Legislative Assembly of Leningrad Oblast. Since 2003 Naginskiy was a member of the Federation Council of the Federal Assembly of the Russian Federation. He was appointed in 2010 as a Deputy Minister of Defence of the Russian Federation, and then in April 2011 as the Head of the Federal Agency for Special Construction.

== Awards ==
- Order of Courage for the strong spirit and self-sacrificing during the activity in Chernobyl NPP accident consequences elimination.
- Honored Builder of Russian Federation for the merits in construction and for the longstanding and dedicated work.
