= Kolesnikov =

Kolesnikov (Russian: Колесников; masculine) or Kolesnikova (Колесникова; feminine) is a Russian surname which means "son of wheelwright". Notable persons with that name include:

- Anastasiya Kolesnikova (born 1984), Russian gymnast
- Andrei Kolesnikov (footballer) (born 1984), Russian soccer player
- Andrei Kolesnikov (general), Russian major-general
- Andrei Kolesnikov (ice hockey) (born 1989), Russian ice hockey player
- Andrey Vladimirovich Kolesnikov (born 1965), Russian journalist and author
- Borys Kolesnikov (born 1962), Ukrainian politician and entrepreneur
- Dmitry Kolesnikov, Russian submarine captain
- Evgeny Kolesnikov (born 1985), Russian basketball player
- Irina Kolesnikova (born 1980), Russian ballet dancer
- Irina Kolesnikova (curler) (born 1964), Russian curler and coach
- Leonid Kolesnikov (1937–2010), Russian swimmer
- Maria Kolesnikova (born 1982), Belarusian politician
- Mikhail Kolesnikov (politician) (1939–2007), Russian general and defense minister
- Mikhail Kolesnikov (footballer, born 1966), Soviet and Russian footballer
- Nadezhda Ilyina (née Kolesnikova; 1949–2013), Soviet-Russian sprinter
- Nadezhda Kolesnikova (1882-1964), leader of the revolutionary movement in Russia
- Nikolay Kolesnikov (weightlifter) (born 1952), Soviet weightlifter
- Nikolay Kolesnikov (sprinter) (born 1953), Soviet sprinter
- Oleg Kolesnikov (born 1968), Russian politician
- Ruslan Kolesnikov (born 2000), Russian boxer
- Sergey Kolesnikov (cyclist) (born 1989), Russian road cyclist
- Sergei Kolesnikov (whistleblower) (born 1948), Russian businessman
- Stepan Kolesnikoff (1879–1955), Russian painter
- Tetiana Kolesnikova (born 1977), Ukrainian rower
- Vladimir Kolesnikov (born 1948), Russian lawyer and politician

== See also ==
- 14354 Kolesnikov, an asteroid named after Yevgeni Kolesnikov
