= Millerhof =

Palace on the Istra Reservoir, Russia

- Миллергоф
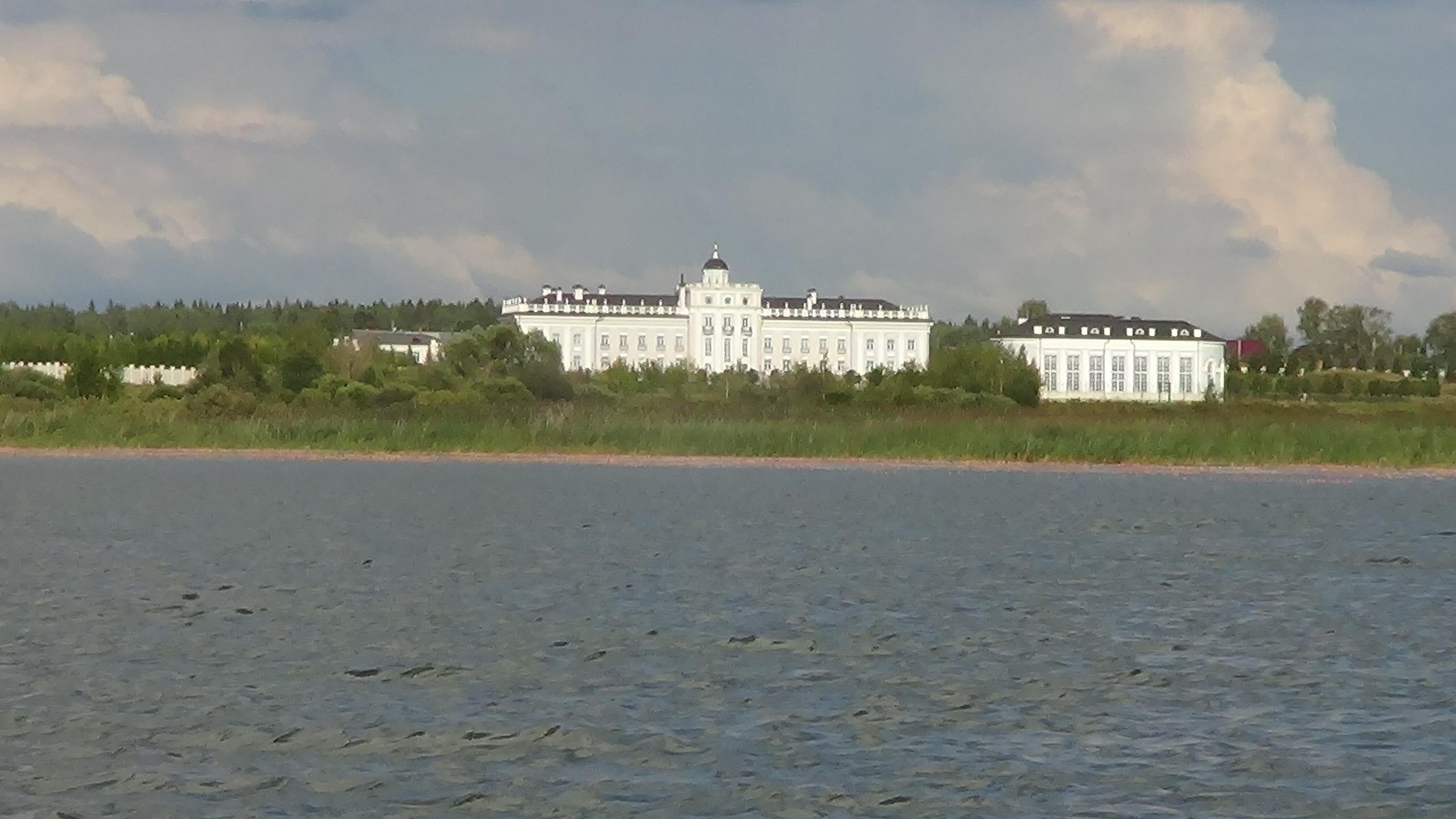
- The palace, as seen from across the reservoir c. 2012

- Location within Moscow Oblast
- Alternative names: Residence on the Istra Reservoir; Резиденция на Истринском водохранилище

General information
- Type: Palace
- Location: Berezhki; Moscow Oblast, Russia
- Coordinates: 56°6′30″N 36°49′46″E
- Construction started: 2008
- Completed: 2009

Millerhof (Russian: Миллергоф) is a folk name of a residence-style palace built on the Istra Reservoir near Berezhki village, Moscow Region, Russia. The palace is also known as the Residence on the Istra Reservoir (Russian: Резиденция на Истринском водохранилище).

== History ==
The palace was constructed in 2008–09, and resembles a somewhat diminished and simplified copy of the famous palaces of Peterhof. The site also hosts several formal gardens that seem to be however inaccessible to the general public.

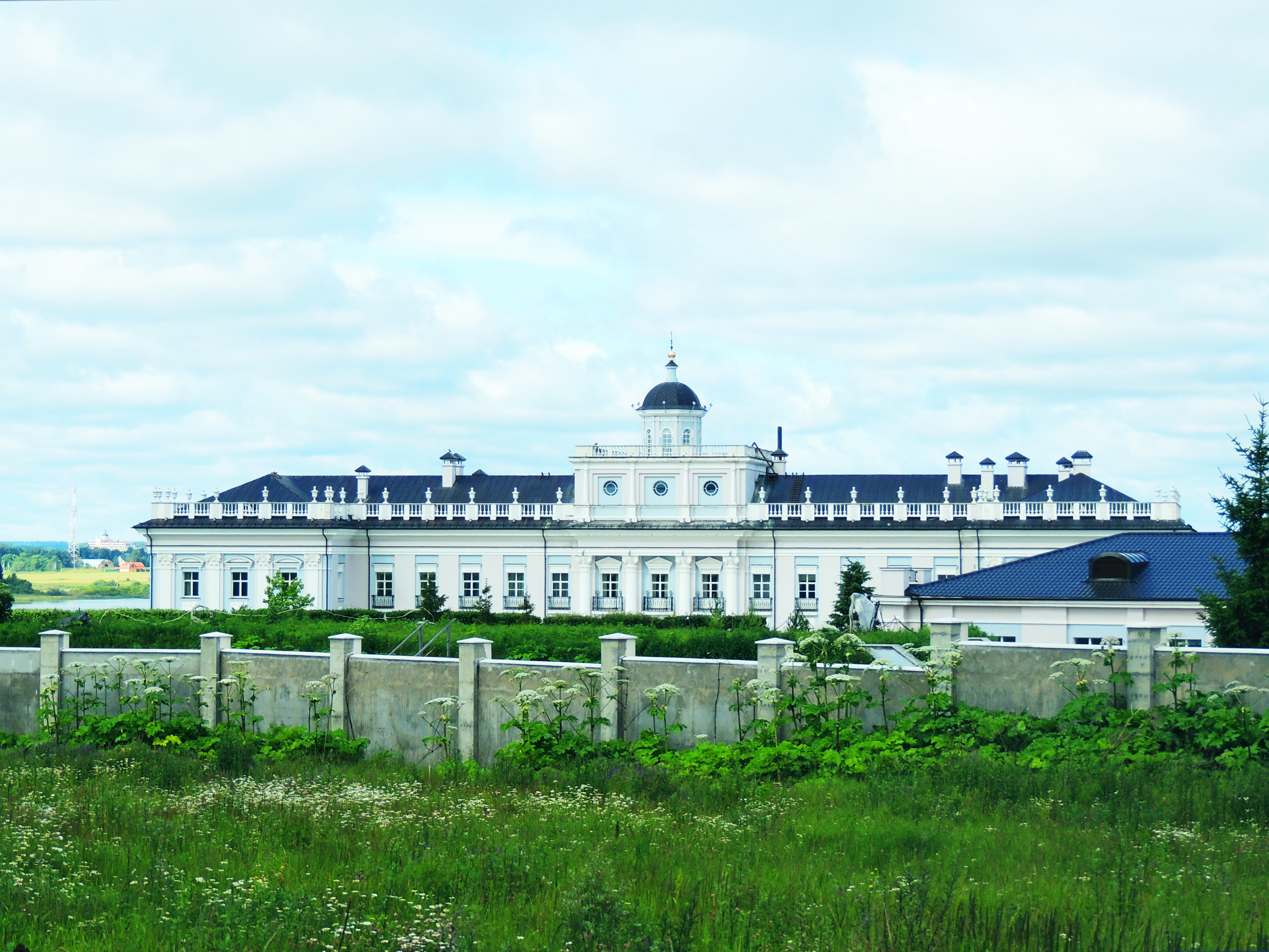
Residence on the Istra Reservoir

Rumors about the ownership of the lavish palace began to circulate almost as soon as the construction was finished. In 2009, Russian newspapers alleged the ownership to Gazprom CEO Alexei Miller. Gazprom however denied the rumors.

In 2010, Jordanian-born Russian businessman and billionaire Ziyad Manasir, then principal shareholder of construction holding company "Stroygazconsulting", told the press that his company was the owner of the Istra Reservoir Palace and that he was living in the palace with his wife and his five children.

"Stroygazconsulting" said, the total construction costs of the palace amounted to 30 million dollars. Independent experts however estimated the costs to twice as much.

According to Ilya Motchalov, vice president of the Russian Association of Landscape Architects, whose own company "Bruns Park" was engaged in the construction of the park, the palace on the Istra Reservoir near Berezhki was built following the design of the Royal Palace of La Granja de San Ildefonso in Spain.

== See also ==
External image
- The bird's eye view of the estate

- Putin's Palace
- Mezhyhirya Residence
