= Mash (online newspaper) =

Russian website

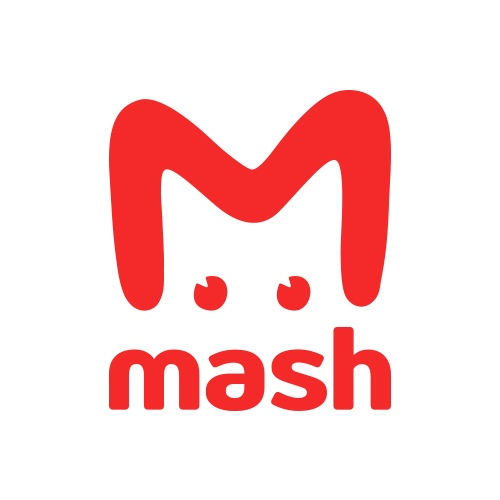
- Type: Online newspaper
- Owner(s): News Media Holding; Maksim Iksanov
- Founder: Nikita Mogutin
- Editor-in-chief: Yevgeny Novikov
- Founded: 6 April 2017; 9 years ago
- Language: Russian
- Headquarters: Moscow, Russia
- Sister newspapers: Life.ru; Zhizn
- Website: mash.ru

Mash is a Russian online newspaper, part of the News Media Holding media holding, founded on 6 April 2017. The idea of the project belonged to Nikita Mogutin, who at that time was working in the Life.ru online news website, within which the project was developed. The Mash channel in Telegram is one of the most popular Russian-language channels.

== History ==
In the spring of 2017, Nikita Mogutin, deputy editor-in-chief of Life, approached Aram Gabrelyanov, CEO of the News Media holding, and his deputy, Anatoly Suleymanov, with the idea of creating Mash. Mogutin found the name for the project in an English dictionary. At first, the Mash editorial office was located in the Life editorial office, but later the project staff moved to a new address.

Active growth in the popularity of Mash occurred between August and September 2017. In December 2017, Mash had 115 thousand subscribers on the Telegram channel. In the same month, the project reached self-sufficiency. In the first months, Mash was actively referred to in Life, since September 2017, other media have been actively using the project materials. Mash is the main official content provider for Life, and the project also provides content for other media, including federal. Mash used the LifeCorr application on a contract basis.

According to the results of the first half of 2017, the Mash Telegram channel took first place in terms of citation in the Russian media in the first rating of Telegram channels presented by Medialogy. From 2017 to July 2022, the channel took first place in the monthly and annual ratings in this category.

On 7 December 2019, Mash telegram channel won in the nomination "Information telegram channel of the year" at the Web Industry Awards Ceremony.

On 1 February 2021, Sergey Titov, deputy editor-in-chief of Mash, announced his departure from the publication after a report about Putin's Palace and an interview with Arkady Rotenberg. According to him, the decision to release these videos was made by "people in suits", and not by Mash employees. He compared what is happening with censorship in the USSR.

== Owners and management ==
Nikita Mogutin was the editor-in-chief of Mash from 2017 to 2018. Maxim Iksanov was the editor-in-chief from October 2018 to 2021. In December 2021, Evgeny Novikov, who previously headed the editorial office of Mash on the Moika, became the editor-in-chief.

In April 2018, Aram Gabrelyanov sold his stake in Mash to Nikita Mogutin. Mogutin owned 51% of Mash LLC, but this share was pledged to Gabrelyanov under a loan agreement dated July 2018. In September 2018, Nikita Mogutin sold his stake and left the project.

== Criticism ==
=== Allies with the state ===
In November 2018, the Proekt publication connected the Mash Telegram channel with Yury Kovalchuk, who got it as part of the termination of cooperation with Aram Gabrelyanov. From that moment on, the publication was supervised by the son of the president of the National Media Group, Kirill Kovalchuk, and the great-nephew of Yuri Kovalchuk, Stepan Kovalchuk.

According to The Insider, the former editor-in-chief, director and co-owner of Mash, Maxim Iksanov, lived in a house owned by the Directorate of the President in Moscow. The Insider publication claims that, according to an extract from Rosreestr, Iksanov lived in an apartment that was registered to his father Takhir Iksanov, the former director of the Bolshoi Theater. Also, according to The Insider, Iksanov received permission to move around Moscow during a COVID-19 pandemic from the presidential administration.

=== Pressure on editors ===
Sergey Titov, deputy editor-in-chief of Mash, resigned after publishing a video about Putin's Palace that showed the inside of the building. He stated that the editorial office acted on the instructions of "people in suits":

"I understand everything about Mash's reputation, I understand about shameful things, but we really did everything we could (when we could). They fit in with Golunov, fiercely supported people in Belarus <…>. We lived in this gray zone and fought desperately for the opportunity not to write shit. But they decided otherwise. You have seen the vids yourself. The work of talented people <…>, all our experiences just crossed out the decisions of people in suits who don’t give a f*** about journalists."
