= Lanfranco Cirillo =

Italian-Russian architect (born 1959)

- Born: 30 May 1959 (age 67); Treviso, Italy
- Education: Ca' Foscari University of Venice
- Occupations: Architect; interior designer; winemaker
- Practice: Masterskaja architectural office
- Buildings: Putin's Palace

Lanfranco Cirillo (born 30 May 1959) is an Italian architect, residing in Moscow and Dubai. He was a founder and co-owner of an architectural studio, Masterskaja, in Moscow. He has provided lucrative services to Russian political elites and oligarchs, including Vladimir Putin. His assets have been targeted by Italian tax authorities on suspicion of tax fraud.

== Early life ==
Cirillo was born in Venice, Italy, in 1959. He studied architecture and graduated from the Ca' Foscari University of Venice. After university, he traveled.

== Career ==
=== Architecture ===
Initially, Cirillo worked in "Arab countries" for several years. In 1991, a friend put him in touch with Vagit Alekperov, president of Lukoil, who "wanted a foreign architect to build him a dacha." Cirillo says, "I started out doing homes. Then I met Lukoil through this man. I worked for Lukoil until 2002-03. I started building for Alekperov and for the deputies of Lukoil. I built on Sretensky Bulvar–interiors, offices, then dachas, offices, apartments."

Cirillo moved to Moscow and worked for the Mascagni Ufficio furniture company. In 1995, he opened his architectural studio, Masterskaja, on Arbat Street in the historic center of Moscow. However, his Italian university diploma was not legally recognized in Russia, so he could not sign off on his own design projects.

Cirillo's clients included Gazprom and Novatek. In the special issue "Russia-Italia" of the business magazine Milano Finanza International, Cirillo reported that he earned $15 million in one year of business. After that, Masterskaja's annual turnover was $30 to $40 million. His staff included 120 architects.

Cirillo became "a kind of lifestyle teacher to the nouveau riche", building and furnishing villas and dachas. His products were turn-key, even including details such as wine glasses and Italian wines. Other projects included decorating 100 metres (330 ft) yachts and designing a golden bathroom for an airplane. According to Cirillo, he built offices and homes for 43 Russian billionaires.

In 2016, Masterskaja reached the final round of the architectural competition for the design of the new parliamentary center in Moscow. However, the idea of the parliamentary center was eventually abandoned. Cirillo closed his architectural firm and stopped doing business in Russia.

In 2021, Cirillo came to international attention when Russian opposition figure Alexei Navalny posted the documentary film, Putin's Palace. History of World's Largest Bribe, to YouTube. The documentary by the Anti-Corruption Foundation was about a 180,000 square feet (17,000 m^{2}) neoclassic mansion on the Black Sea reportedly owned by Russian President Vladimir Putin; its construction is believed to have cost over US$1 billion in 2009. Although Cirillo designed the palace and selected its interior decor and furnishings, he was not involved in its construction. He stated that his client was Stroygazconsulting, a company owned by a Jordanian businessman, which wanted a place for meetings and receptions. Cirillo said, "Aesthetically speaking, it is very correct considering historical proportions. It is not kitsch. It's not overdone, but naturally it is rich, as it was supposed to be. And we used fantastic materials. I was proud of my job. It's very good 'Made in Italy.'"

The controversy brought Cirillo to the attention of Italian tax authorities. Since 2022, he has been under investigation for tax offenses in Italy from 2013 to 2019. As part of their investigation, Italian authorities seized assets totaling 141 million euros from Cirillo's villa near Brescia, Italy, including a private helicopter, jewelry, and a 150-piece art collection with works by Paul Cézanne, Giorgio de Chirico, Amedeo Modigliani, and Pablo Picasso.

In February 2022, Cirillo's lawyers said that he was able to provide documents and testimony to prove that his income was earned outside Italy and, therefore, should not have been taxed there. In an interview with Libero in November 2022, Cirillo said, "I started working in this country [Russia] in 1993, I have been registered with AIRE since 2003, and I even receive my pension in Russia. The thesis of my fictitious stay abroad, on which the entire indictment is based, is a real paradox".

=== Viticulture ===
In May 2016, Cirillo announced plans to build a winery and agrotourism project near Anapa. As of February 2016, he was a fifty percent owner of Anapa-based Shumrinka LLC, according to the Unified State Register of Legal Entities. His business partner was Alexander Kislitsyn, the former head of Lukoil-Inform. Shumrinka owns approximately 400 hectares (990 acres) of land near Gaikodzor for vineyards and related infrastructure; its main activity is growing grapes. Cirillo said they planned to create "a small Tuscan village" and aimed to reach a production volume of one million bottles per year by 2021. Meanwhile, the company has expanded its production and built a new warehouse. At the end of 2020, the winery became a partner of the Milstream winery as part of the Unique Russian Winemaking project. In 2021, Schumrinka wines ranked fiftieth in the Forbes ranking of the best wines in Russia.

== Personal life ==
In 2014, Cirillo received Russian citizenship after more than twenty years of residence in the country. He also owns three villas in Porto Cervo in Sardinia. He lives between Moscow and Dubai, traveling the world for charity projects and polar expeditions. After the 2019 death of his daughter Elisabetta, a novelist, at the age of 33 from cancer, he decided to "do something for the next generation.". He has campaigned for sustainability and environmental protection, issues that were close to her heart. Cirillo traveled to Africa to address the problem of rainforest deforestation in Guinea. He is involved in an international foundation that researches climate change in the polar regions of the Arctic and Antarctic. He is trying to bring the Pope to the North Pole to draw attention to the destruction of the Arctic.

Cirillo is also a sailing enthusiast. His Fantastica team celebrated success in the Melges 32 class, winning the world title in 2013. As the main sponsor of the Russian team in the Finn class, he has made a contribution to the preparation of the Russian Olympic sailing team. PROyachting named Cirillo "Patron of the Year" in 2016 for his support of the Russian Olympic sailing team. The Russian Sailing Federation is building a sailing center in Gelendzhik with his participation.

In an interview with TV Rain, Cirillo said he supported the Russian Orthodox Church, although he himself is a Catholic.
