= Federal Agency for Special Construction =

- Федеральное агентство специального строительства Federal'noye agenstvo spetsyal'nogo stroitl'stva
- Emblem of the Spetstroy

- Flag of Spetstroy

Agency overview
- Formed: 31 March 1951
- Dissolved: 27 September 2017
- Headquarters: 4b Bolotnikovskaya street, Moscow
- Employees: Classified
- Agency executive: Director
- Parent agency: Ministry of Defense
- Website: Ministry of Defense Website

The Federal Agency for Special Construction (Russian: Федеральное агентство специального строительства) known in its acronym Spetsstroy of Russia (Russian: Спецстрой России) was a federal executive body of the Russian Federation that carried out, in the interests of the defense and security of the state, the organization of work in the field of special construction, communications and road construction by engineering and road construction military formations that were under its control. Spetsstroy was under the jurisdiction of the Ministry of Defense of Russia. The President of Russia exercisee control over the activities of Spetsstroy. The license plate code for vehicles of the Spetstroy was 09.

== History ==
=== Soviet era ===
On March 31, 1951, by resolution of the Council of Ministers of the Soviet Union No. 1032-518ss/op, with the aim of creating the S-25 Berkut air defense system around Moscow, Construction Directorate No. 565 (SU No. 565) of the Soviet Ministry of Internal Affairs was created on the basis of the Main Directorate of Industrial Construction Camps (Glavpromstroy) of the Soviet Ministry of Internal Affairs, this date is considered the birthday of Spetsstroy of Russia.

On March 16, 1953, by resolution of the Soviet Council of Ministers No. 697-355ss/op, Construction Directorate No. 565 was transferred from the Soviet Ministry of Internal Affairs to the 3rd Main Directorate under the Soviet Council of Ministers, and then after the merger of the latter with the 1st Main Directorate on July 26, 1953 - to the Ministry of Medium Machine-Building.

On July 13, 1953, SU No. 565 was transformed into the Main Directorate of Special Construction (Glavspetsstroy) with the addition of specialized directorates from the former 1st and 3rd Main Directorates under the Soviet Council of Ministers. At the time of its formation, the new structure consisted of 14 construction and installation directorates, 10 separate construction sites, and 5 industrial enterprises of various profiles. The purpose of its creation was to solve problems related to the construction of individual especially important defense facilities. In October 1953, the Leningrad Directorate for the construction of special air defense facilities was organized as part of Glavspetsstroy; in March 1954, the task was set to build from scratch the GIPH site (more than 300 scientific and production buildings on 200 hectares) and the settlement of Kuzmolovskiy for 10,000 people.

The total number of employees of Glavspetsstroy during this period was: 42 thousand military builders and 50 thousand special contingent - prisoners of correctional labour camps.

In accordance with the resolution of the Council of Ministers No. 408-178ss of March 10, 1954, the joint Order of the Minister of Medium Machine Building and the Ministry of Internal Affairs No. 265ss/00217 of March 16, 1954, Glavspetsstroy was again transferred from the jurisdiction of the Ministry of Medium Machine Building to the jurisdiction of the Ministry of Internal Affairs of the USSR.

Since 1955, the scope of Glavspetsstroy's activities has expanded and in various regions it has carried out the construction of space infrastructure facilities, which include the Mission Control Center (MCC) in Korolev, Moscow Region, the Energomash plant in Khimki, the Progress plant in Kuibyshev, test stands in Verkhnyaya Salda and many others.

On May 8, 1956, by Resolution of the Soviet Council of Ministers No. 600-355ss, Glavspetsstroy was finally removed from the Ministry of Internal Affairs and was subsequently part of various ministries and departments of the Soviet Union: until June 25, 1956, it was part of the Soviet Ministry of Construction, then from June 25, 1956, it was part of the RSFSR Ministry of Construction, from January 23, 1963, it was the RSFSR Ministry of Installation and Special Construction, from March 13, 1963, it was subordinated to the Ministry of Installation and Special Construction Works, and from October 2, 1965, it was the USSR Ministry of Installation and Special Construction. In the last year of the existence of the Soviet Union: from September 5, 1990, Glavspetsstroy was part of the USSR Council of Ministers, and from November 28, 1991, it was the RSFSR Glavspetsstroy (as an agency with the rights of the RSFSR State Committee).

Glavspetsstroy also carried out construction of aviation industry facilities. Since 1970, builders of the Severodvinsk Directorate of Glavspetsstroy participated in the creation of production capacities for the construction and repair of nuclear submarines. With its own powerful construction industry, Glavspetsstroy mastered the production of new series of residential buildings year after year. It built and delivered more than 17 million square meters of comfortable housing, and carried out the construction of various social and cultural facilities, including a unique cycle track in Krylatskoye Sports Complex Velodrome.

=== Russian Federation ===
After the collapse of the Soviet Union and the formation of the Russian Federation on December 25, 1991, Glavspetsstroy of the RSFSR accordingly changed its name to the Main Directorate of Special Construction of the Russian Federation (Glavspetsstroy of Russia), but already on September 30, 1992, by Decree of the President of Russia No. 1148, Glavspetsstroy of Russia was transformed into the Federal Directorate of Special Construction under the Government of Russia.

On July 16, 1997, on the basis of FUSS of Russia, FSU "Dalspetsstroy" under Gosstroy of Russia, GVEVU of the State Communications Committee of Russia, as well as the Central Directorate of Military Construction Units under the Ministry of Atomic Energy of Russia, the Federal Service for Special Construction of Russia (Rosspetsstroy) was formed, uniting the above-mentioned institutions, including all military formations that are part of them. The organizational regulatory legal acts for the implementation of activities in the sphere of special and road construction, operation, restoration and construction of telecommunication networks, as part of the newly formed federal executive authority, approved the structure of engineering and technical and road construction military formations, as well as their management bodies.

On October 6, 1997, the Federal State Budgetary Institution of Construction of the Ministry of Defense of Russia joined Rosspetsstroy with all military units, organizations and their management bodies that were previously subordinate to it. These same organizational and staffing measures established the staff number of Rosspetsstroy military personnel in the amount of 20 thousand units, and the staff number of military personnel of the central office of Rosspetsstroy in the amount of 230 units (excluding personnel for the protection and maintenance of buildings).

=== First abolition and recreation ===
On April 30, 1998, in connection with the formation of a new structure of federal executive bodies, Rosspetsstroy was abolished in accordance with decree of the President of Russia No. 483, and the military formations subordinate to it were transferred to FAPSI and the Ministry of Defense of Russia. By Order of the Government of Russia dated May 11, 1998 No. 499-r, a 3-month period was initially approved for the liquidation commission of the abolished Rosspetsstroy to complete all liquidation activities for the department, which was then extended until January 1, 1999, and subsequently until April 1, 1999.

Less than a year later, on February 4, 1999, on the basis of the abolished Rosspetsstroy, which at that time was still undergoing liquidation activities, by decree of the President of Russia No. 174 under the State Committee for Construction, Architectural and Housing Policy, a structure for conducting activities in the field of special construction was recreated - the Federal Directorate for Special Construction under the State Committee of the Russian Federation for Construction, Architectural and Housing Policy (Spetsstroy of Russia). The same Decree returned to its composition all military formations previously transferred to FAPSI and the Ministry of Defense of Russia during the dissolution of Rosspetsstroy. The staff number of military personnel of Spetsstroy is established in the amount of 9.5 thousand units, and the staff number of military personnel of the central office of Spetsstroy in the amount of 120 units (excluding personnel for the security and maintenance of buildings).

Six months later, on August 27, 1999, the Federal Directorate for Special Construction under the Russian State Construction Committee was again transformed, becoming a federal executive body subordinate to the Russian Government, the Federal Service for Special Construction under the Russian Government.

Less than a year later, on May 17, 2000, the newly formed federal service was reassigned directly to the President of Russia, this time as the Federal Service for Special Construction. The number of military personnel of Spetsstroy was increased, now equal to 14.7 thousand units, the number of military personnel of the central office of Spetsstroy accordingly increased to 160 units (excluding personnel for the security and maintenance of buildings).

On January 19, 2005, in accordance with the order of the Government of Russia No. 38-r, the partial disbandment of military construction management bodies and military construction units subordinate to them, which are part of the Ministry of Defense, as well as some military construction management bodies of Spetsstroy began (military construction units that were part of other ministries and departments of Russia were disbanded back in the 1990s, or transferred to Rosspetsstroy during their merger in the same period). The remaining military construction management bodies of the Ministry of Defense (including military construction units subordinate to them), which were not included in the list of those to be liquidated, in accordance with this Order were transferred to Spetsstroy through reorganization into departmental Federal State Unitary Enterprises (FSUEs) and Federal State Institutions.

In 2006, the then Minister of Defense of the Russian Federation, Sergei Ivanov, announced that by the end of that year, the processes of liquidation and transfer of military construction management bodies and the military construction units subordinate to them to Spetsstroy would be completed, in connection with which there would be no more "construction battalions" within the Ministry of Defense.

=== Reform ===
At the end of 2010, a reform began in , during which the engineering and technical military formations included in it began to be disbanded, mainly from among those operating in the field of construction, restoration and operation of telecommunications networks - military engineering technical communications formations.

In August 2011, the Director of the Agency Grigory Naginsky announced that by the end of that year the Agency would completely separate from the Russian Ministry of Defense, becoming an independent construction organization. More than 3 thousand military construction workers will be discharged into the reserve or will be assigned to civilian positions. He emphasized that there will be no conscript soldiers left in Spetsstroy, who will be replaced by workers from "friendly republics". The largest of the construction projects will be the final stages of the Novorossiysk Naval Base and the Vostochny Cosmodrome.

On November 22, 2011, decree No. 1526s of the President of Russia was issued, according to which the Military Operational and Restorative Communications Department (MOC) under the Spetsstroy of Russia, as well as all remaining undisbanded military engineering technical communications formations (including the Military Technical University and the Medical Center under the Spetsstroy of Russia) were to be transferred to the Russian Ministry of Defense. The process of liquidation of military engineering technical communications formations under Spetsstroy continued at least until the end of 2012 - some of them were disbanded, others were transferred to the Ministry of Defense.

By the beginning of 2016, the staff number of military personnel of engineering and technical military formations (military engineering technical formations of special construction that were not disbanded or transferred to the Ministry of Defense), as well as road construction military formations under Spetsstroy, according to the latest version of regulatory legal acts, amounted to 17.2 thousand units, the staff number of civilian personnel of these military formations - in the amount of 5200 units, the maximum number of federal state civil servants of the central office of Spetsstroy - in the amount of 270 units (excluding personnel for the security and maintenance of buildings).

=== Second abolition ===
In November 2016, a decision was made to abolish Spetsstroy and transfer its functions to the Ministry of Defense of Russia. On December 29, 2016, the President of the Russian Federation signed Decree No. 727 "On the abolition of the Federal Agency for Special Construction", according to which Spetsstroy ceases its independent activities by July 1, 2017. By order of the Government of Russia dated February 14, 2017 No. 259-r, the liquidation period of Spetsstroy is set until October 1, 2017. The functions of Spetsstroy of Russia, as well as all engineering and road construction military formations included in it, are transferred to the Ministry of Defense of the Russian Federation, integrating into the structure of the Military Construction Complex of the Armed Forces of the Russian Federation, which then changed its name to the Military Construction Complex of the Ministry of Defense of the Russian Federation (MCC of the Ministry of Defense of Russia).

On September 27, 2017, the Federal Agency for Special Construction (Spetsstroy of Russia) was liquidated as a legal entity. Decree of the President of Russia dated October 18, 2019 No. 504 created the public-law company "Military Construction Company" (Russian: Военно-строительная компания).

== Directors ==
- Mikhail Maltsev (1951–1954)
- Nikolai Zolotaryevski (1954–1981)
- Valery Martynov (1981–1992)
- Aleksandr Tumanov (30.11.1992-1997)
- Nikolai Koshman (16.7.1997-8.5.1998)
- Nikolay Abroskin (2.3.1999-22.4.2011)
- Grigory Naginsky (22.4.2011-25.7.2013)
- Aleksandr Volosov (25.7.2013-30.6.2017)
