= Sergei Kolesnikov (whistleblower) =

Russian businessman (born 1948)

- Сергей Колесников
- Born: 1948 (age 77–78); Leningrad, Russian SFSR, Soviet Union (now Saint Petersburg, Russia)
- Occupation: Entrepreneur

Sergei Vladimirovich Kolesnikov (Russian: Сергей Владимирович Колесников; born 1948) is a Russian businessman who has lived in self-imposed exile outside Russia since 2010. He is best known as a whistleblower after his December 2010 letter to Dmitry Medvedev, which exposed a corrupt scheme that included the construction of 'Putin's Palace' and challenged the Russian president to fight corruption. After he left Russia, his revelations of large scale corruption in President Putin's inner circle led to investigations in major Western media.

== Career ==
Kolesnikov graduated from the Leningrad Polytechnical Institute in 1972, where he studied biophysics. He holds a doctorate from the Sergei Kirov Military Medical Academy, and spent 20 years as a scientist specialising in the applications of biophysics in medicine.

In 1991, he and scientific colleagues combined with the Saint Petersburg health authorities to found a state enterprise to manufacture medical equipment which they had been developing. In 1992, when it became legal, they set up a joint stock company called Petromed, a joint venture with Saint Petersburg's Department of International Economic Ties, then headed by Putin. Petromed expanded through the 1990s from the manufacture of equipment to procurement, and from procurement to major health infrastructure projects. The election of Vladimir Yakovlev as Mayor of Saint Petersburg was a setback for Petromed as the company did not enjoy as good relations with him as they had with Anatoly Sobchak. The publicly owned stake in the company was sold so that Kolesnikov and another of the co-founders, Dmitri Gorelov, each held a 50% stake.

== Putin's palace ==
Kolesnikov's involvement in this is described in his letter to Medvedev and has been covered by the media, notably by David Ignatius in The Washington Post, who concluded from his investigations that 'Kolesnikov is one of those brave souls a journalist meets occasionally, who decides to expose what he sees as wrongdoing, regardless of the personal risks.' In 2000, Gorelov was approached by Nikolai Shamalov, a close associate of Putin. Shamalov, on behalf of Putin, proposed the following scheme: Petromed would be commissioned to undertake a number of health infrastructure projects, funded by oligarchs, including Roman Abramovich. A portion of the donations would be siphoned into an investment fund, opaquely controlled by Putin.

This scheme went ahead, including 'Project South', aka Putin's Palace, which Shamalov supervised. Kolesnikov claims that he became disillusioned when, in the aftermath of the 2008 financial crisis, he was instructed that all funds were to be directed to Putin's Palace and investment projects on which people's livelihoods depended were to be shut down. In September 2010, he left Russia having decided to become a whistleblower. After consulting lawyers and meeting with Washington Post columnist David Ignatius, he published his letter to Medvedev, which met with official denials. The plausibility of these denials has been undermined by investigations by Novaya Gazeta, which revealed a paper trail going back to the Kremlin.

Asked by Masha Gessen why he had become a whistleblower, he replied: 'On the one hand, it's a complicated question, on the other hand, it's simple. If you are a Russian, if Russia is your homeland, and if you have something you can do for her, then the act is perfectly natural. Sometimes I wondered whether I would be able, for example, to 'go over the top' as my father did. Well, I came to the conclusion that maybe I could.' On Russia today, he is pessimistic: 'My analysis led to the conclusion that the country has no real positive development. The country is heading for collapse. Moreover, for a really serious collapse, possibly revolution. And considering that today Russia is a nuclear power, and that revolution in a country where there is a huge number of nuclear weapons is an incredibly dangerous thing for the existence of the whole world, I came to the conclusion that something had to be done. These were the main motives for my decision to write the letter. Well, in the end, let's say, I have lived most of my life, I've got children and grandchildren, and not just me, everyone.'
