= Theo Albrecht Jr. =

German businessman (born 1950)

- Born: 1950 (age 74–75); Bremen, West Germany
- Occupation(s): Owner of Trader Joe's and Aldi Nord
- Spouse: Katje Albrecht
- Children: 1
- Parent(s): Theo Albrecht (father); Cäcilie Albrecht (mother)
- Relatives: Berthold Albrecht (brother); Karl Albrecht (uncle); Karl Albrecht Jr. (first cousin); Beate Heister (first cousin)

Theodor "Theo" Albrecht Jr. (born 1950) is a German billionaire businessman, the owner of Trader Joe's and Aldi Nord, and the son of Aldi's co-founder. As of July 2021, Albrecht's net worth is estimated at US$20.6 billion.

== Early life ==
Albrecht was born in Bremen, West Germany in 1950, the son of Theo Albrecht, the co-founder of the supermarket chain Aldi.

== Career ==
In 2010, his father Theo Albrecht died, leaving the ownership of the German supermarket chain Aldi Nord and US supermarket chain Trader Joe's to his two sons, Theo Jr. and Berthold, but Berthold died in 2012. Theo Albrecht Jr. and the heirs of his brother Berthold inherited the fortune, which originally grew from a corner grocery shop opened back in 1913.

== Wealth ==
Albrecht's estimated net worth is US$20.6 billion, as of July 2021, according to Forbes.

== Personal life ==
Albrecht lives in Mülheim an der Ruhr, Germany, and has one child.
