= Karl Albrecht Jr. =

German billionaire businessman (born 1948)

- Born: 1948 (age 77–78); Essen, Germany
- Occupation: Businessman
- Known for: heir to Aldi fortune
- Parents: Karl Albrecht (father); Mia Tenbrink (mother)
- Relatives: Beate Heister (sister); Theo Albrecht (uncle); Theo Albrecht Jr. (first cousin); Berthold Albrecht (first cousin)

Karl Hans Albrecht Jr. (born 1948) is a German billionaire, and the son of Karl Albrecht, who founded the discount supermarket chain Aldi with his brother Theo.

Albrecht worked for Aldi Süd in various roles until his resignation due to a cancer diagnosis (from which he subsequently recovered). He and his sister Beate Heister control the family trust, the Siepmann Stiftung (named for their mother), which, in turn, controls Aldi Süd, the source of their joint fortune.

According to Bloomberg Billionaires Index, he has an estimated net worth of US$14.3 billion, making him the 149th wealthiest person in the world, as of June 2021.

== Life ==
Karl Albrecht Jr. was born in 1947 as the son of Karl Albrecht and Maria Albrecht (née Tenbrink). He completed his Abitur in Switzerland, after which he studied law and earned a doctorate in jurisprudence. He subsequently began working in various positions for the Aldi Süd group and was, among other roles, responsible for the company's operations in the United States. In 2004 he retired after being diagnosed with cancer for the third time, from which he has since recovered.

Karl Albrecht Jr. is married to Gabriele Mertes (born 1953) and has no children.

== Wealth ==
Together with his sister Beate Heister, he controls the family foundation, the Siepmann-Stiftung (named after their grandmother), which in turn controls Aldi Süd, the source of their shared fortune. The foundation holds the group's overall assets and the trademark rights to Aldi Süd.

In the Forbes World's Billionaires list, he and his sister Beate Heister were ranked 23rd in 2019.

Other foundations include the Oertl Foundation (formerly the Maria Albrecht Foundation) and the Elisen Foundation. While the Oertl Foundation provides financial support for cardiovascular research, the Elisen Foundation is dedicated to the promotion of cultural projects.
