= Theo Albrecht =

German businessman (1922–2010)

- Born: Theodor Paul Albrecht; 28 March 1922; Essen, Rhine Province, Prussia, Weimar Republic
- Died: 24 July 2010 (aged 88); Essen, North Rhine-Westphalia, Germany
- Occupation: Entrepreneur
- Known for: Co-founder of Aldi, owned Trader Joe's and Aldi Nord
- Spouse: Cäcilie Albrecht
- Children: Theo Albrecht Jr.; Berthold Albrecht
- Parent(s): Anna Siepmann (mother); Karl Albrecht (father)
- Relatives: Katje Albrecht (daughter-in-law); Babette Albrecht (daughter-in-law); Nicolay Albrecht (grandson); Karl Albrecht (brother); Karl Albrecht Jr. (nephew); Gabriele Mertes (niece); Beate Heister (niece); Peter Heister (nephew); Peter Max Heister (great-nephew)

Theodor Paul Albrecht (German: [ˈalbʁɛçt]; 28 March 1922 – 24 July 2010) was a German entrepreneur. He established the discount supermarket chain Aldi with his brother Karl Albrecht. In 2010, Theo was ranked by Forbes as the 31st richest person in the world, with a net worth of $16.7 billion (equivalent to 24.7 billion in 2025).

== Business career ==
Albrecht learned the grocery business from his mother, in order to escape the fate of his father, who was a miner. In 1946, he and his brother Karl developed Albrecht Diskont, with the motto "the best quality at the lowest price", now one of Europe's largest chains of supermarkets, known by the acronym Aldi. In 2014, Forbes estimated Albrecht's fortune at approximately £11 billion (equivalent to £14.7 billion in 2024). Theo and Karl Albrecht split the Aldi company in 1960 after a dispute about whether or not to sell cigarettes. The supermarket divided into two legally separate operating units, with two distinct geographical locations. Theo's Aldi Nord operated in the north of Germany, while Karl's Aldi Süd was based in the south. Albrecht retired from daily operations in 1993 and remained as chairman of the company's board.

== Kidnapping ==
In 1971, Albrecht was kidnapped. A ransom of seven million German marks (approximately US$2 million at the time) was paid for his release. He was held at gunpoint by Heinz-Joachim Ollenburg, a lawyer, and his accomplice Paul Kron. The ransom sum was delivered by Franz Hengsbach, then Bishop of Essen. His kidnappers were eventually caught by authorities, but only half of the money was recovered. Albrecht later unsuccessfully claimed the ransom as a tax deductible business expense in court.

== Personal life ==
Albrecht was raised in a Catholic household. In 1940, at the age of 18, Theo was conscripted into the German Army and served in the North African campaign. Theo was captured by Americans in Tunisia. In 1946 he returned to Germany.

Albrecht's kidnapping in 1971 partially explained his and the family's decision to largely withdraw from public life. As a result, little is known about them. The kidnapping caused him to drive to work in an armored car, using a different route every day. The Albrecht family members are known to be very reclusive and have been described by Forbes as 'more reclusive than the yeti'. Theo was rarely pictured by photographers, and he never made a public statement. The last published photo of Theo Albrecht dates from 1971, one day after his kidnapping. Another photo of the two Albrecht brothers together was taken in 1987 by journalist Franz Ruch.

Albrecht and his brother Karl were once said to own an island located in the North Sea, where they indulged their hobbies such as golf and pastimes, including the collecting of antique typewriters. Theo had, as do members of the Albrecht family now, a highly secure estate overlooking the Ruhr valley. Obsessed with frugality, Theo is said to have collected and used pencil stubs frequently. He was also known to wear cheap, poorly fitting suits, and preferred plain meals with many potatoes. When he was asked to approve the plans for a new store in the Netherlands, he stated that the design was good, but the paper it was drawn on was too thick: "If you use thinner paper, we will save money."

Albrecht died 24 July 2010, in his hometown of Essen.

== See also ==
- List of kidnappings
- List of solved missing person cases: 1950–1999
