= Aldi Nord =

North German multinational discount supermarket chain

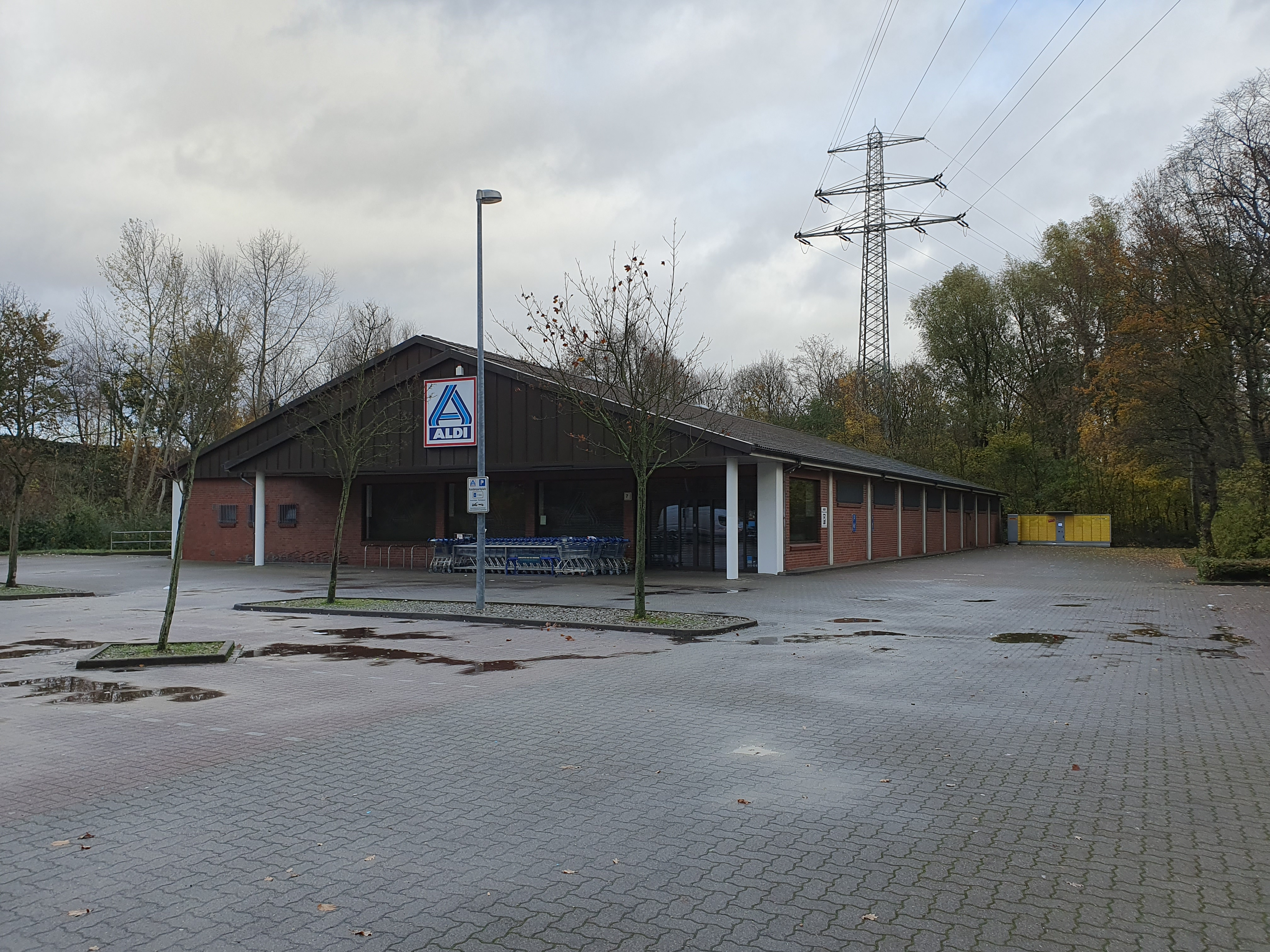
- Aldi Nord in Hamburg, Germany
- Type: Private
- Industry: Retail
- Founded: 10 July 1946; 80 years ago (split in two parts in 1960, renamed to Aldi Nord and Aldi Süd in 1962)
- Founders: Theo Albrecht
- Headquarters: Essen, Germany
- Number of locations: 6,300 (2026)
- Area served: Europe: Germany Poland France Spain Portugal Netherlands Belgium Luxembourg; United States
- Products: Groceries; Consumer goods
- Revenue: Aldi Nord: ▲31 billion € (2025); Trader Joe's: ▲21.5 billion $ (2025)
- Number of employees: Aldi Nord: 90,000 (2025); Trader Joe's: 50,000 (2025)
- Subsidiaries: Trader Joe's
- Website: aldi.com aldi.de

Aldi Nord or Aldi (German pronunciation: [ˈaldiː], stylised in all caps) is a Northern German multinational family-owned discount supermarket chain operating over 13,600 stores in 18 countries. The business was founded by brothers Karl and Theo Albrecht in 1946, when they took over their mother's store in Essen.

The enterprise was split into two separate groups in 1960 that later became Aldi Nord (initially operating in northern West Germany), headquartered in Essen, and Aldi Süd (initially operating in southern West Germany), headquartered in neighbouring Mülheim. As the business expanded internationally, the two divisions maintained this separation, dividing global markets between them, with the exception of the United States, where both operate: Aldi Süd under the Aldi name, while Aldi Nord owns Trader Joe's.

In 1962, they introduced the name Aldi (a syllabic abbreviation for "Albrecht Diskont"). In Germany, Aldi Nord and Aldi Süd have been financially and legally separate since 1966, although they may appear to operate as a single enterprise with certain store brands or when negotiating with contractor companies.

Aldi Nord and sister company Aldi Süd are the main competitors of the German discount chain Lidl in most markets.

== Ownership ==
Aldi Nord is owned by three private family foundations (German: Stiftung): Markus-Stiftung, Jacobus-Stiftung, and Lukas-Stiftung, which together hold 100% of the company under a structure known as a Doppelstiftungsmodell (lit. 'dual-foundation ownership model'). These foundations are based in Nortorf, Schleswig-Holstein.

The foundations' assets include Aldi Nord's operations in Germany, organised into 23 regional companies, as well as international subsidiaries in Belgium, France, Luxembourg, the Netherlands, Poland, Portugal, and Spain, and ownership of Trader Joe's in the United States. The group also owns its headquarters in Essen, office and warehouse facilities, and more than 5,300 store properties worldwide. The group has been described as having little or no debt.

== History ==
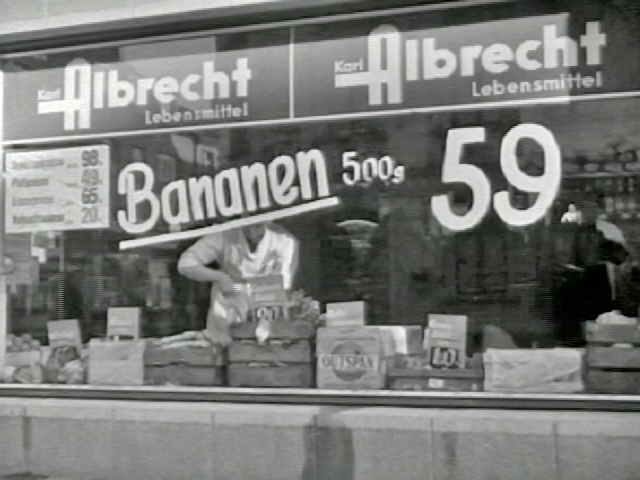
Albrecht grocery store in Essen-Schonnebeck, 1958

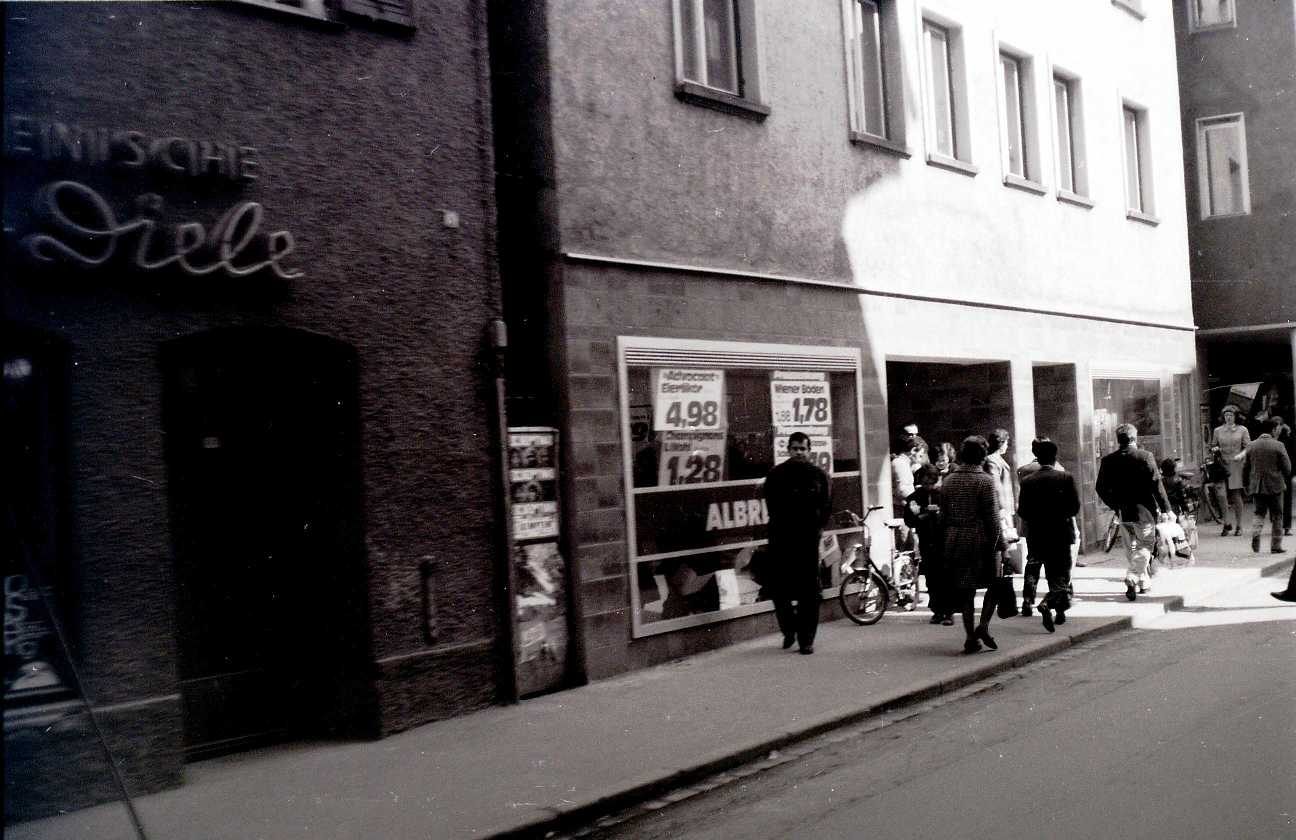
Aldi grocery store in Memmingen, c. 1968

In 1913, Karl and Theo Albrecht's mother opened a small store in a suburb of Essen, Germany. Their father was employed as a miner and, after asthma forced him to quit that job, later found work as a baker's assistant. Karl and Theo were born in 1920 and 1922, respectively. Theo Albrecht completed an apprenticeship in his mother's store, while Karl Albrecht worked in a delicatessen.

Karl Albrecht took over a food shop seized from Jewish grocer F. W. Judt, and he later served in the German Army during World War II. In 1945, the brothers took over their mother's business and soon opened another retail outlet nearby. By 1950, the Albrecht brothers owned 13 stores in the Ruhr Valley.

The brothers' idea was to subtract the legal maximum rebate of 3% before sale. The market leaders at the time, which often were co-operatives, required their customers to collect rebate stamps and to send them at regular intervals to reclaim their money. The Albrecht brothers also rigorously removed merchandise that did not sell from their shelves, cutting costs by neither advertising nor selling fresh produce, and keeping the size of their retail outlets small. By 1960, 300 stores were in Germany.

=== Split ===
The brothers split the company in 1960, reportedly over a dispute about whether they should sell cigarettes. The split led to Theo running Aldi Nord and Karl running Aldi Süd. At the time, they jointly owned 300 shops. Journalist Martin Kuhna, however, questioned said reason for the split in an article published by the Westdeutsche Allgemeine Zeitung in September 2009, where he suspected that the real reason for the split lay in the vastly differing management styles of the brothers. In 1962, they introduced the name Aldi—short for Albrecht-Diskont, which translates into English as Albrecht Discount, which became their formal corporate name in 1975. Aldi Nord and Aldi Süd have been financially and legally separate since 1966.

=== International expansion ===
Aldi started to expand internationally in 1967, when Aldi Süd acquired the grocery chain Hofer in Austria. Aldi Nord opened its first stores abroad in the Netherlands in 1973, and other countries followed. In 1976, Aldi Süd opened its first store in the United States in Iowa, (Note: Aldi purchased Iowa's Benner Tea chain and opened its first United States store in Burlington, Iowa, in 1976.) and, in 1979, Aldi Nord acquired Trader Joe's.

After German reunification and the fall of the Iron Curtain, Aldi experienced a rapid expansion. The brothers retired as CEOs in 1993. Control of the companies was placed in the hands of private family foundations, the Siepmann Foundation (Aldi Süd), and the Markus, Jakobus, and Lukas Foundation (Aldi Nord).

== Business organisation ==
=== Germany ===
Aldi in Germany

The Aldi Nord group currently consists of 35 independent regional branches with around 2,500 stores. Aldi Süd is made up of 24 companies with around 2,000 stores. The border between their territories is commonly known as the Aldi-Äquator (lit. 'Aldi equator') and runs from the Rhine via Mülheim an der Ruhr, Wermelskirchen, Marburg, Siegen, and Gießen east to just north of Fulda.

The former East Germany is served by Aldi Nord, except for one Aldi Süd in Sonneberg, Thuringia, whose regional office is in Bavaria. The regional branches are organised as limited partnerships, with a regional manager for each branch, who reports directly to the head office in Essen (Aldi Nord) or Mülheim an der Ruhr (Aldi Süd).

=== Internationally ===
Distribution of Aldi in Europe as of 2023: Aldi Nord Aldi Süd

The Aldi group operates over 12,000 stores worldwide. Aldi Nord is responsible for its stores in Northern Germany, Belgium, France, Luxembourg, the Netherlands, Poland, Portugal, and Spain. Aldi Nord also owns the Trader Joe's grocery chain in the United States, which operates separately from the group.

While Aldi Nord has renamed its Dutch and Belgian subsidiaries Combi and Lansa to the Aldi Markt/Aldi Marché brand, Aldi Süd tries to maintain a regional appearance, branding its stores Aldi Süd in Germany, Aldi Suisse in Switzerland, and Hofer in Austria and Slovenia.

Aldi Nord's Trader Joe's is based in the Southern Californian market.

In December 2020, Aldi bought 545 supermarkets and three warehouses of Leader Price and another two Casino supermarkets in France for €717 million from Casino Group. The transaction is part of Aldi's plan to catch up with Lidl in France.

In December 2022, Aldi Nord issued a press release stating that Aldi is withdrawing from Denmark after 45 years of operations there; 114 of the chain's total of 188 stores will be taken over by Norwegian competitor Rema 1000. In August 2023, the Danish Competition and Consumer Authority approval of the Rema 1000 acquisition was announced. Another 21 of the initial 188 stores was taken over by Danish competitor Netto during 2023.

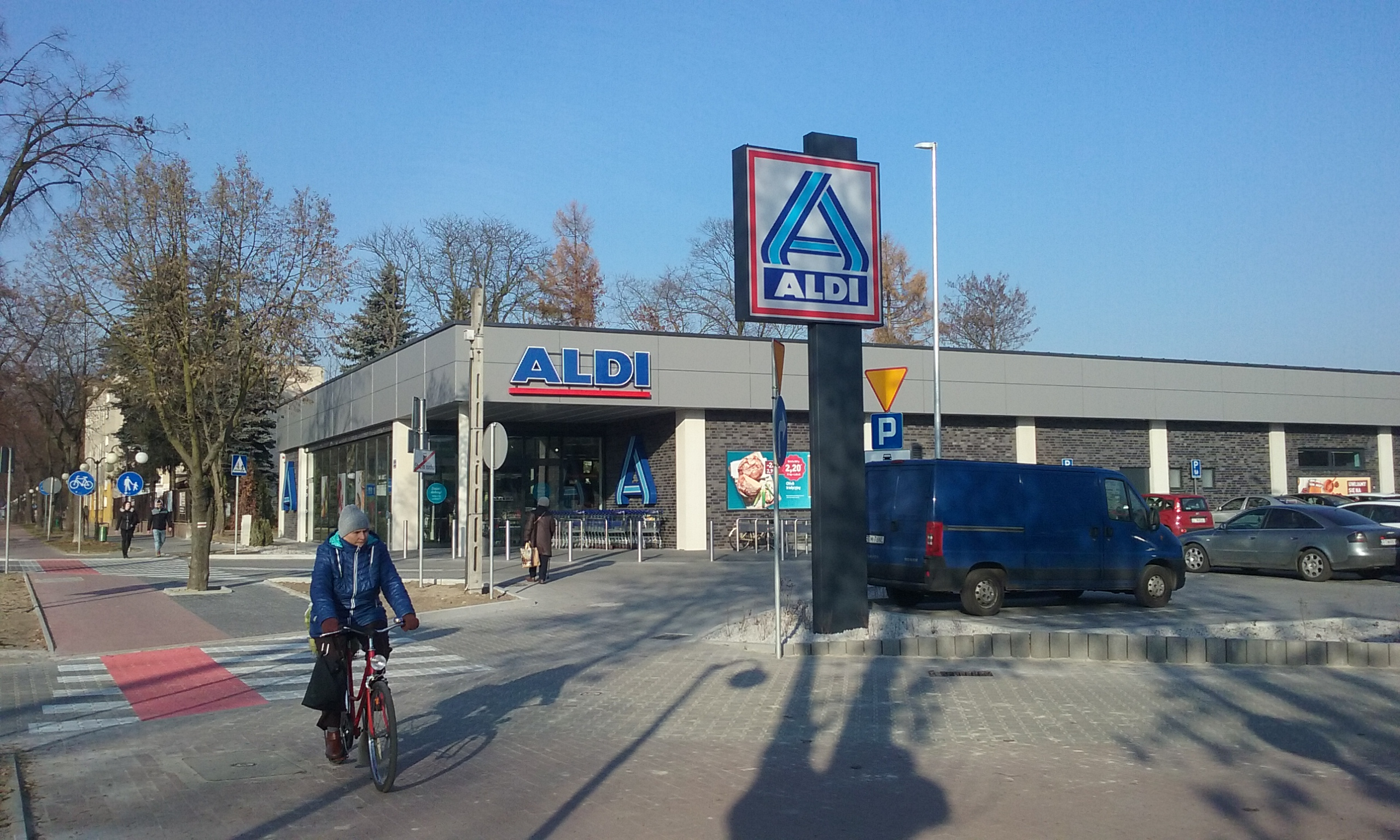
An Aldi Nord in Tomaszów Mazowiecki, central Poland

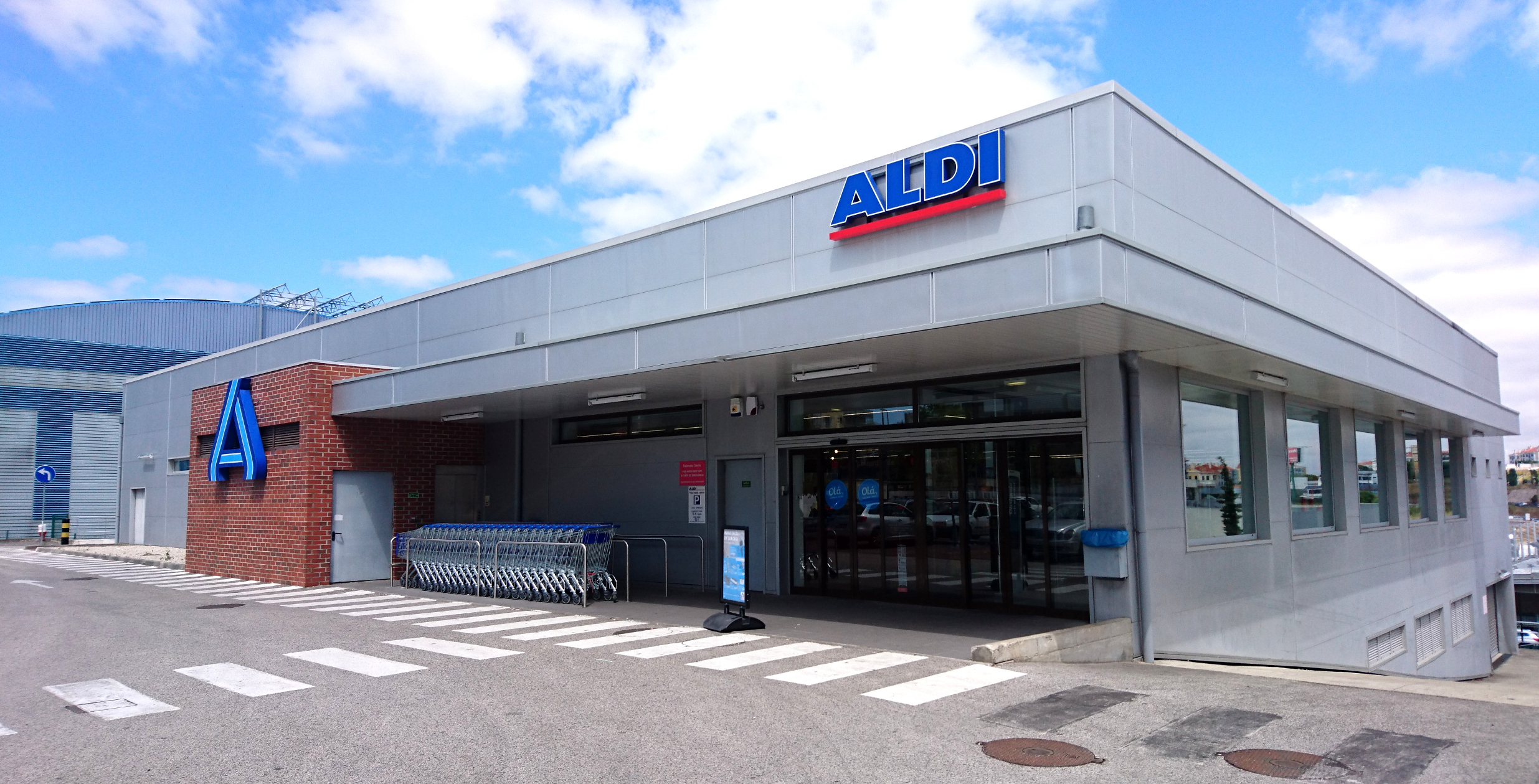
Aldi Nord store in Amadora, Portugal

=== Geographic distribution ===
Country	Name (group)	Since	Stores	Ware- houses	Number of Employees	As of	Ref.
Belgium	Aldi (Nord)	1973	459	7	8,600	Aug. 2026	
France	Aldi (Nord)	1988	1,366	16	16,000	Aug. 2026	
Germany	Aldi (Nord)	1961	2,236	22	40,000	Aug. 2026	
Luxembourg	Aldi (Nord)	1990	18	0 (Note: Supplied by Aldi Belgium)	350	Aug. 2026	
Netherlands	Aldi (Nord)	1975	472	6	10,000	Aug. 2026	
Poland	Aldi (Nord)	2008	428	3	5,000	Aug. 2026	
Portugal	Aldi (Nord)	2006	167	1	2,800	Aug. 2026	
Spain	Aldi (Nord)	2002	511 (Note: Spain: 493 stores, Canary Islands: 16 stores, Ceuta: 1 store, Melilla: 1 store)	6	8,000	Aug. 2026	
United States	Trader Joe's (Nord)	1979	661	12	50,000	Aug. 2026	
Total number of Aldi Nord stores + warehouses			6,318	73	140,750		

== Business practices ==
=== In-store layout ===
Aldi stores are noted as examples of so-called no-frills stores that often display a variety of items at discount prices, specialising in staple items, such as food, beverages, toilet paper, sanitary articles, and other inexpensive household items. Many of its products are own brands, with the number of other brands usually limited to a maximum of two for a given item.

Aldi mainly sells exclusively produced, custom-branded products, often very similar to and produced by major brands, and relies on relabelled major-brand products with brand names including Grandessa, Happy Farms, Millville, Simply Nature, Clancy's, and Fit & Active.

Branded products carried include Haribo in Germany, Knoppers in Belgium, France, and the United States. Unlike most shops, Aldi does not accept manufacturers' coupons, although some US stores successfully experimented with them.

In addition to its standard assortment, Aldi has weekly special offers, some of them on more expensive products such as electronics, tools, appliances, or computers. Discount items can include clothing, toys, flowers and gifts. Special offers have limits on quantities and last one week. Aldi's early computer offers in Germany, such as a Commodore 64 in 1987, resulted in those products selling out in a few hours.

Aldi is the largest wine retailer in Germany.

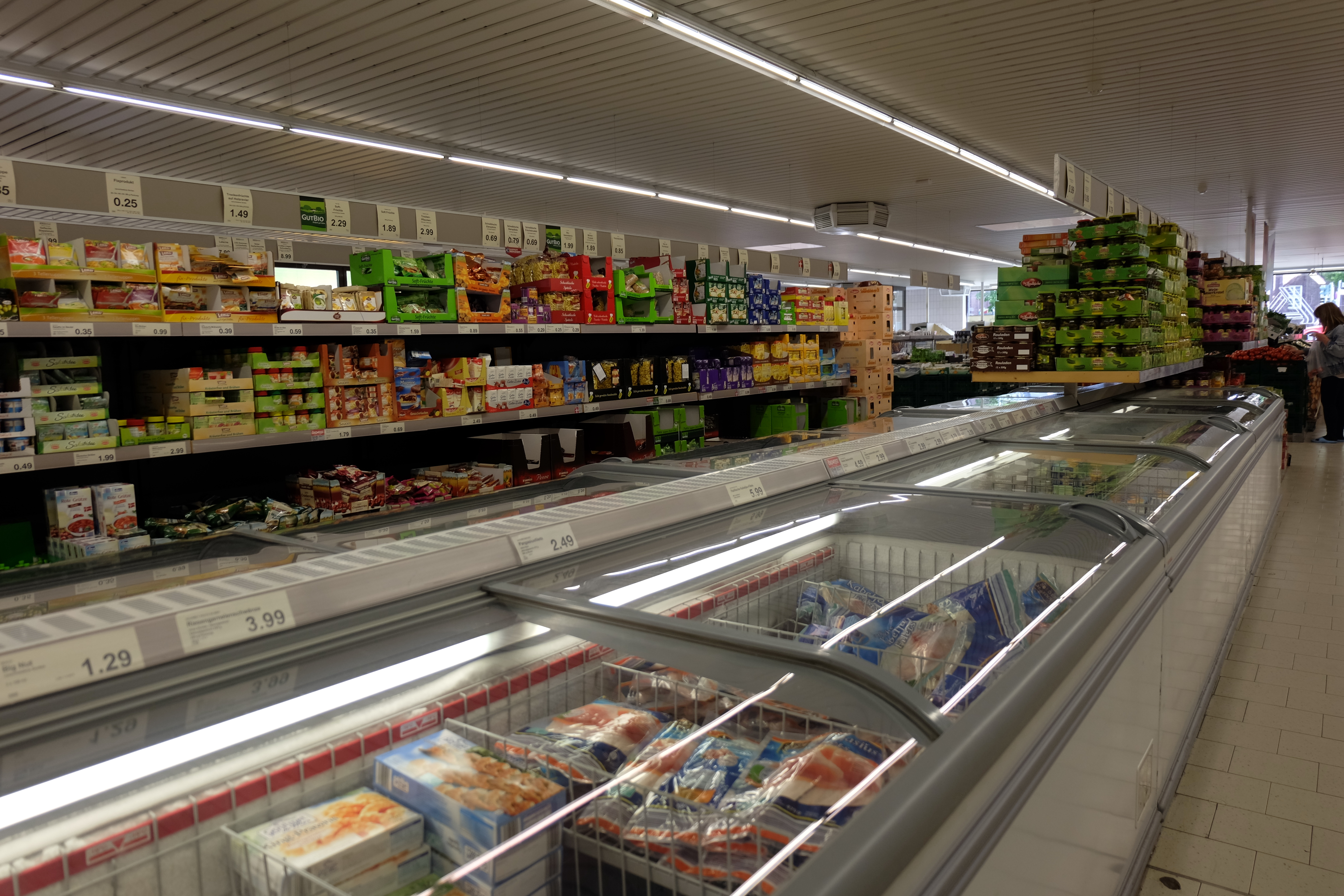
Aldi Nord interior

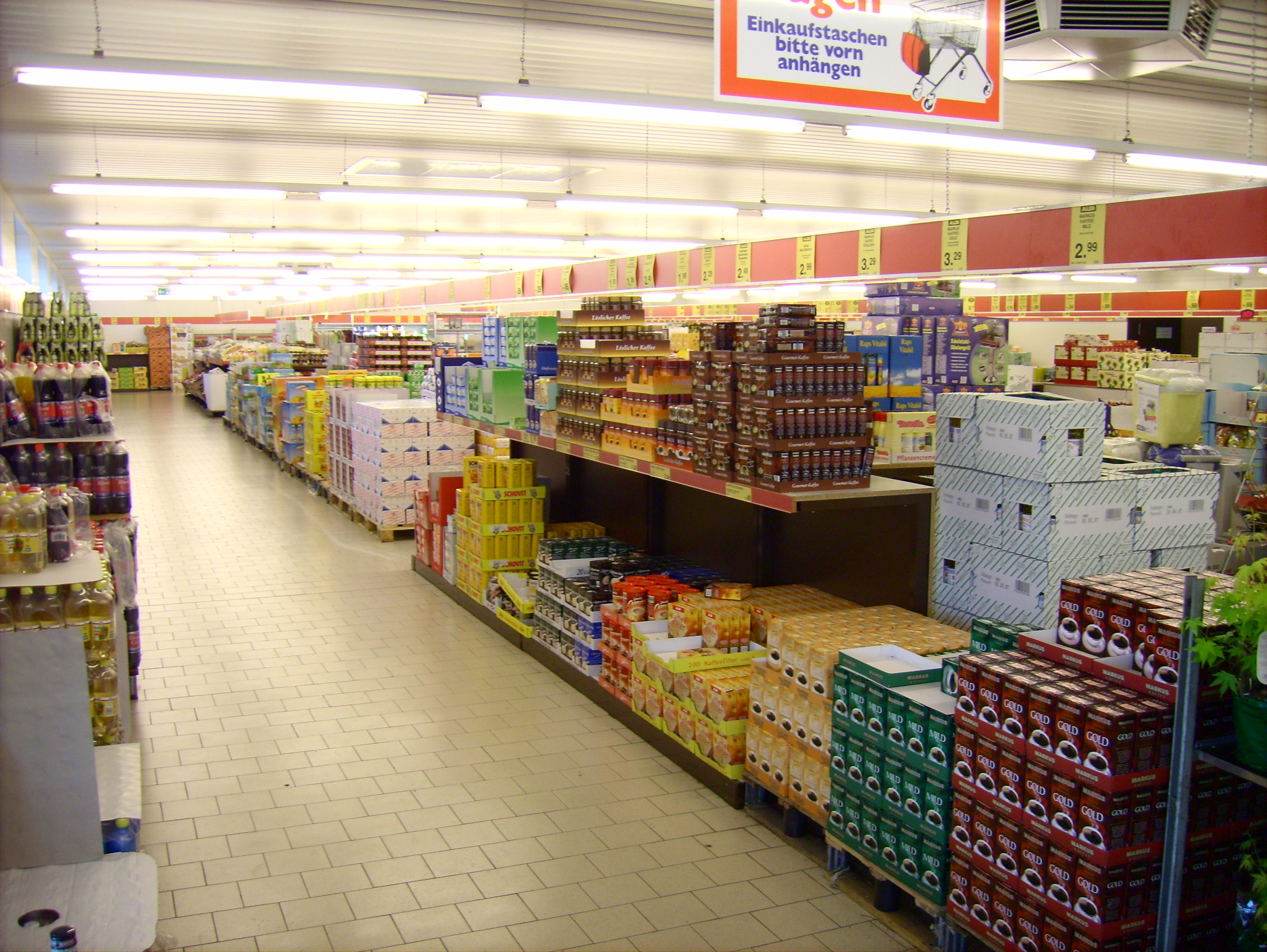
The inside of an Aldi Nord in Dortmund, Germany. All Aldi stores display their products in their original shipping boxes.

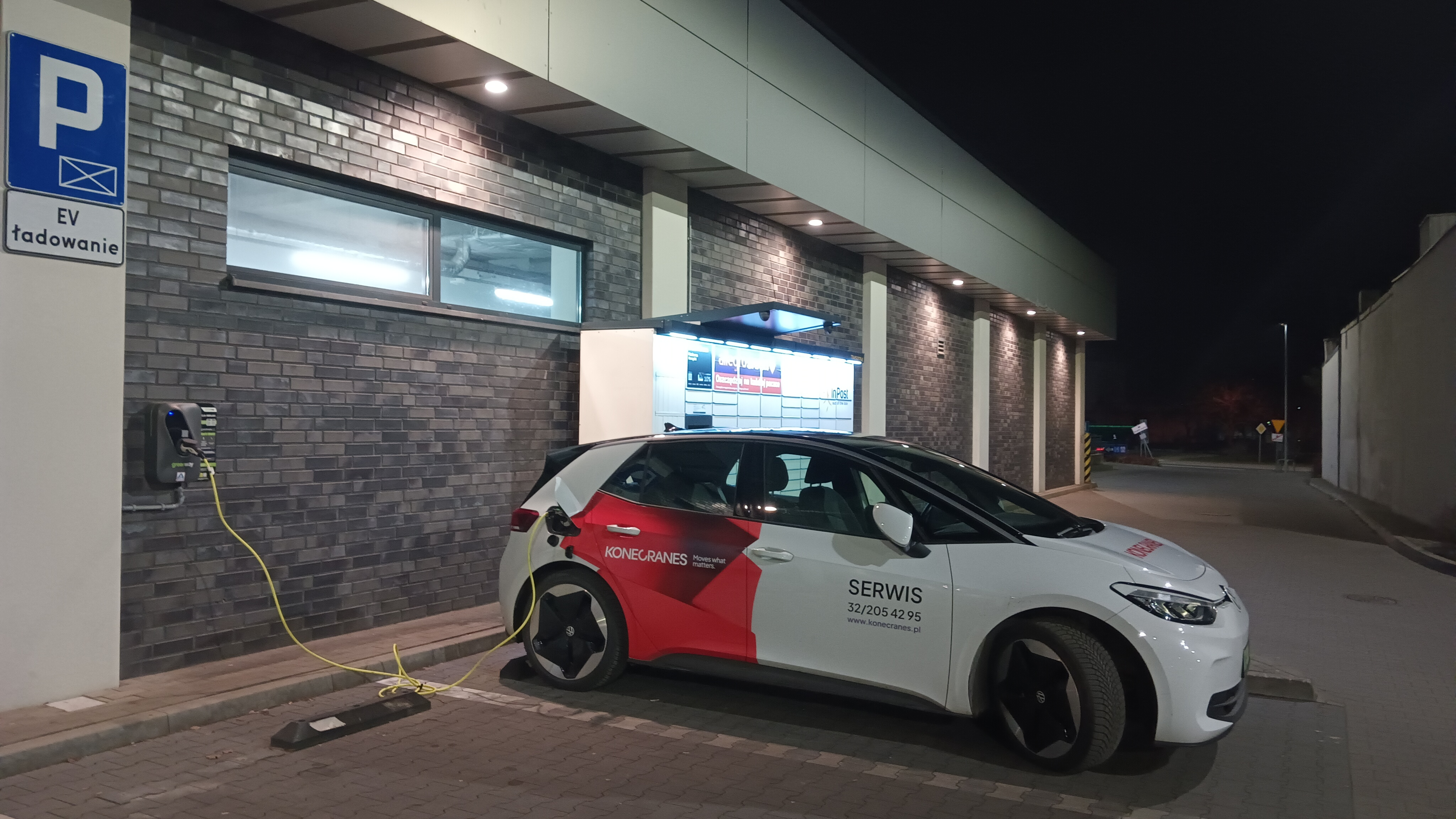
Electric vehicle charging station on the wall of Aldi in Tomaszów Mazowiecki, Poland

=== Advertising policy ===
In Belgium, print, radio, and television ads started appearing in late 2017. These ads were based on the positive results of taste tests, where the chain pitted its own products against common name-brand products.

=== Logos and branding ===
Wordmark variant of Aldi Nord logo used since 2016

The two stores Nord and Süd have distinct logos, with Nord displaying the entire 'A' for Aldi.

== Subsidiaries and joint ventures ==
Subsidiaries include the mobile network operator Aldi Talk, the alcoholic drink brand Aldi Alcohol, and petrol station retailer Diskont. Home appliance and multimedia products are labeled under different names, mostly manufactured by Medion.

=== Aldi Talk ===
Aldi Nord and sister company Aldi Süd have a mobile virtual network operator in Germany called Aldi Talk, also known as MEDIONmobile (service provider is Medion). Aldi operates a similar network in Australia using Telstra's network, called "ALDImobile". Aldimobile is also in Switzerland by Sunrise LLC. In Austria and Slovenia, Hofer stores serve as distributors for the brand HoT Hofer Telekom (the service provider is Ventocom).
