= Berthold Albrecht =

German businessman (1954–2012)

Berthold Albrecht

Berthold Albrecht (14 August 1954 in Essen – 21 November 2012 in Chur) was a German businessman and one of Germany's wealthiest men. He was co-owner (with his brother Theo Albrecht Jr.) of the Aldi Nord chain of discount supermarkets, which they inherited upon the death of their father, Theo Albrecht, in July 2010. Together, the two brothers had an estimated net worth of US$17.8 billion as of March 2012.

Albrecht was the chairman of the Markus Foundation. Additionally, he owned Weba-Holding GmbH.

== Personal ==
His uncle, Karl Albrecht, owned Aldi Süd and was Germany's wealthiest person up until his death in 2014.

Berthold and his wife, Babette Albrecht, had three daughters and one son. The latter, Nicolay Albrecht, accused his mother and three sisters of embezzling money from the family trust in September 2020.
