= Beate Heister =

German business executive and heiress (born 1951)

- Born: Beate Albrecht; 5 October 1951 (age 74)
- Spouse: Peter Heister
- Children: 6
- Parent(s): Karl Albrecht (father); Mia Tenbrink (mother)
- Relatives: Karl Albrecht Jr. (brother)

Beate Heister (née Albrecht; born 5 October 1951) is a German billionaire heiress. She is one of the two children of Karl Albrecht, who founded the discount supermarket chain Aldi with his brother Theo which split into Aldi Nord and Aldi Süd. As of 2022, she was one of the five richest women in the world, according to Forbes magazine. Together with her brother Karl Albrecht Jr., as of 2020, she had a net worth of US$41.3 billion, putting them at the top of Forbes list of the richest Germans.

== Personal life ==
Heister was born in 1951 in Essen and lives in Neuss, Germany. She is married to entrepreneur Peter Heister, who is related to the Werhahn family and was the former head of Aldi Süd. They have six children.

She is "notoriously reclusive". In a 2014 feature article on the Albrecht family, Manager Magazin compared Beate to her father Karl Albrecht, saying that she resembled him "especially in her sometimes uncompromising hardness".

== Business ==
Heister controls half of Aldi Süd, which operates more than 6,000 stores in southern Germany, the US, Austria, Italy, Switzerland and many other countries. She, her husband Peter, and their son Peter Max Heister, all sit on Aldi's advisory board. Her son Christian sits on the board of directors. As of 2021, Heister remained active as a board member of the Siepmann Foundation, which takes its name from the maiden name of her paternal grandmother.
