= Karl Albrecht =

German entrepreneur (1920–2014)

- Born: Karl Hans Albrecht; 20 February 1920; Essen, Rhine Province, Weimar Republic
- Died: 16 July 2014 (aged 94); Essen, Germany
- Occupation: Entrepreneur
- Known for: Co-founder of Aldi
- Spouse: Mia Tenbrink
- Children: Karl Albrecht Jr.; Beate Heister
- Relatives: Theo Albrecht (brother); Theo Albrecht Jr. (nephew); Berthold Albrecht (nephew)

Karl Hans Albrecht (German: [ˈalbʁɛçt]; 20 February 1920 – 16 July 2014) was a German entrepreneur who founded the discount supermarket chain Aldi with his brother Theo. He was the richest person in Germany for many years. In February 2014, he was ranked the 21st-richest person in the world by Hurun Report.

== Biography ==
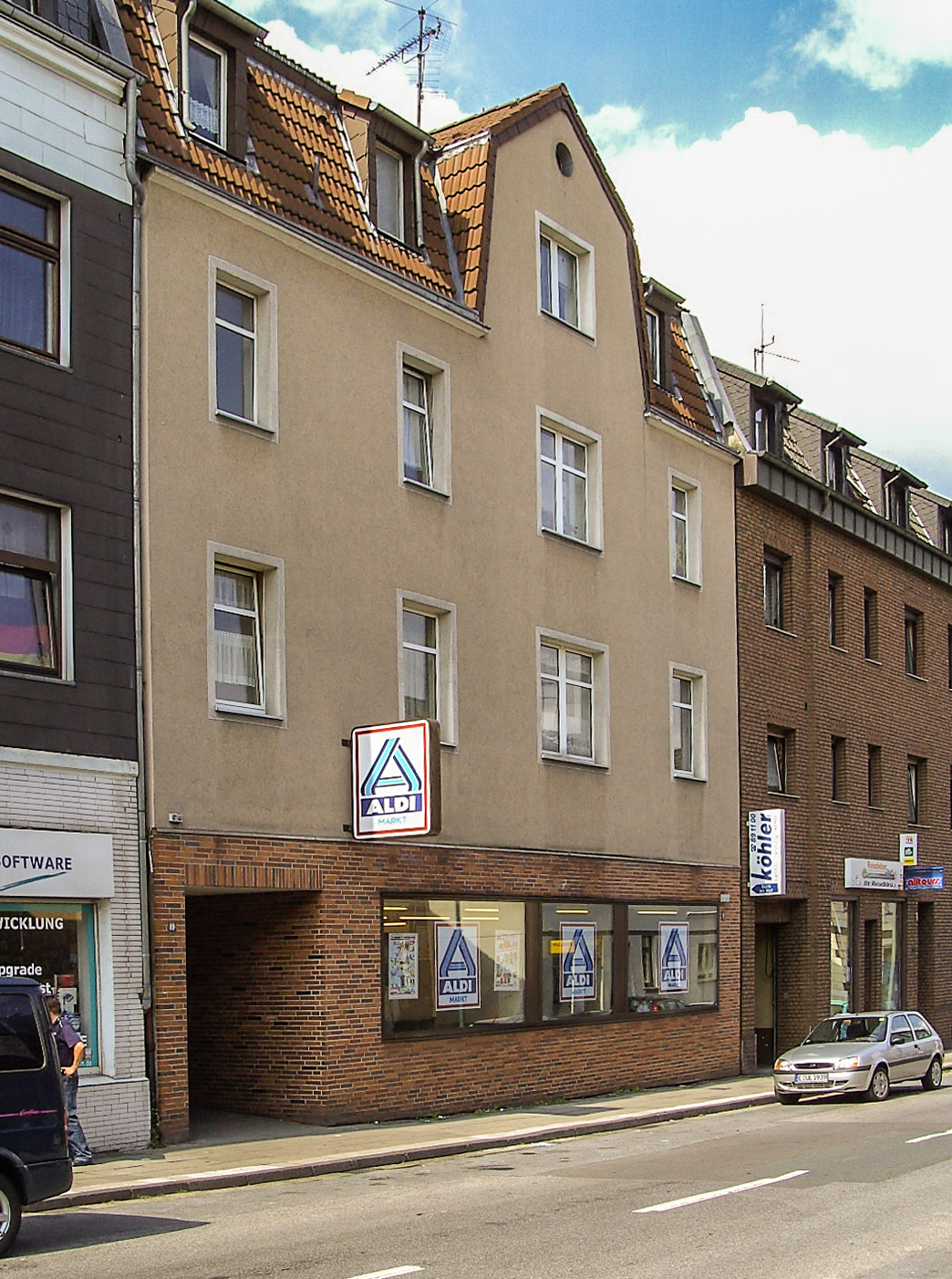
First Aldi store in Schonnebeck, Essen

Karl and Theo Albrecht were born and raised in a Catholic family in modest circumstances in Essen, Germany. Their father, Karl Sr., worked as a miner and later as a baker's assistant, while their mother Anna (née Siepmann) ran a small grocery store in the workers' quarter of Schonnebeck, a suburb of Essen. Theo completed an apprenticeship in his mother's store, while Karl worked in a delicatessen shop. Karl served in the Wehrmacht during World War II and was wounded on the Eastern Front. After the war, the brothers jointly took over their mother's business and founded Albrecht KG.

In 1960, the brothers faced a disagreement over whether to stock cigarettes in their stores. While Theo advocated for selling cigarettes, Karl expressed concerns that they would attract shoplifters. As a result, they decided to divide their stores into two parts: Theo retained all stores north of the Ruhr, while Karl retained those south of the Ruhr. This division led to the opening of the first Aldi (short for Albrecht Discount) in 1962, and the two groups became known as Aldi Nord and Aldi Süd, respectively.

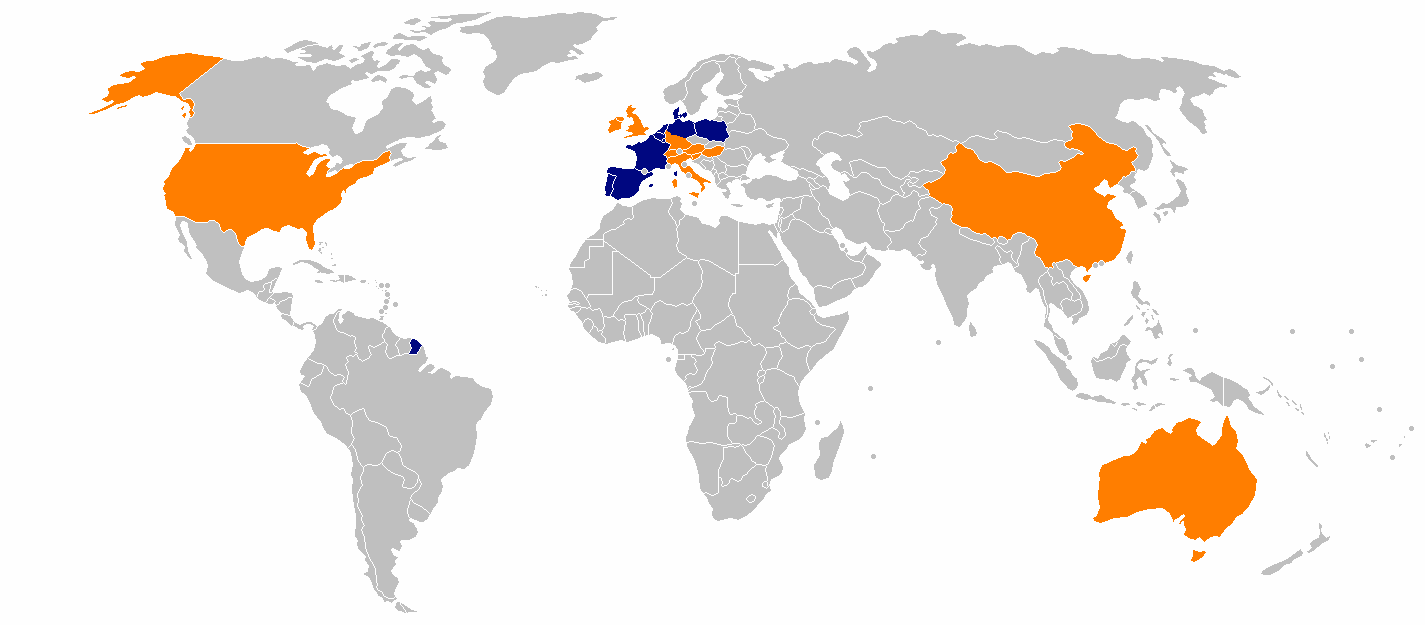
Aldi around the world (blue = Aldi north, orange = Aldi south)

In 1994, Karl Albrecht removed himself from the daily operations of Aldi Süd and took the position of chairman of the board until 2002. At the beginning of 2002, he also relinquished this position, thereby completely ceding control of the firm. As of 2010s, the business is no longer run by any of Karl Albrecht's family members.

=== Personal life ===
Karl Albrecht was a very reclusive man who had not taken part in public life for several years prior to his death. As a result, little is known about him. Forbes magazine reported that he had two children, neither of whom was employed by Aldi. He reportedly lived in Essen, as did his brother Theo until the latter's death. Golf was one of his hobbies, and Albrecht played the sport on his own golf course, the Öschberghof, which he built in 1976. He also raised orchids.

== Fortune ==
In 2014, Albrecht was listed as one of the richest people in the world with an estimated net worth of US$23.14 billion. Forbes magazine listed him as the third-richest man in the world in 2004. In 2012, with an estimated net worth in 2011 of US$25.4 billion, the magazine ranked him tenth on its list of billionaires – making him the oldest billionaire, age 91, in the Top 20 list. Upon his death, Albrecht was named the richest person in Germany, and the fourth-richest in Europe.
