= List of Russian nationals named in the CAATSA unclassified report =

List of prominent Russian nationals published by the U.S. Treasury in 2018

The list of Russian nationals named in the CAATSA unclassified report, also known as the CAATSA Report or "Putin list", was a list published by the U.S. Treasury Department in 2018. It contained the names of 210 prominent Russians, including members of the government of Russian president Vladimir Putin and alleged Russian oligarchs.

== Background ==
Section 241 of the Countering America's Adversaries Through Sanctions Act of 2017 (СААTSA) required the Secretary of the Treasury, in consultation with the Director of National Intelligence and the Secretary of State, to submit to the appropriate congressional committees a detailed report оп senior political figures and oligarchs in the Russian Federation (Section 241 (a)(1)) and on Russian parastatal entities (Section 241 (а)(2)).

Although it was widely, and incorrectly, reported in the media that those on the list "may be subject to sanctions", the CAATSA Report itself made clear that it "in no way should be interpreted to impose sanctions on those individuals or entities". It also specified that inclusion in the report "does not constitute the determination by any agency that any of those individuals or entities meet the criteria for designation under any sanctions program", and in no way indicates that "the U.S. Government has information about the individual's involvement in malign activities".

The list below is from the unclassified section of the Section 241 (a)(1) section of the report.

== Controversy regarding the "oligarchs" section ==
The list of "oligarchs" submitted as part of one of the five reports delivered to Congress on 29 January 2018 included 96 names.

According to the document itself, its criterion for inclusion as an "oligarch" was simply being a Russian with a net worth of over $1 billion. The list was criticised for being indiscriminate, and including critics of Putin.

Shortly after the list was released, it was reported that the Treasury Department had simply copied it from the Forbes' 2017 "World Billionaires" list: people, including those with non-Russian citizenship on the Forbes list who had Russian heritage and a net worth of $1 billion or more, had been indiscriminately included in the CAATSA Report. In its response to a lawsuit asserting that the compilation of the list was "arbitrary, capricious, and contrary to law", the Treasury Department has confirmed that it is "not challenging" the allegation that it had "simply republished" the Forbes billionaires list.

== List of names ==
According to CNN, the people named on the list were:

=== Presidential administration ===
1. Anton Vayno, Head, Presidential Administration
2. Alexey Gromov, First Deputy Head, Presidential Administration
3. Sergey Kiriyenko, First Deputy Head, Presidential Administration
4. Magomedsalam Magomedov, Deputy Head, Presidential Administration
5. Vladimir Ostrovenko, Deputy Head, Presidential Administration
6. Dmitriy Peskov, Deputy lead, Presidential Administration; Presidential Press Secretary
7. Vladislav Kitayev, Chief of Presidential Protocol
8. Andrey Belousov, Aide to the President
9. Larisa Brycheva, Aide to the President
10. Vladislav Surkov, Aide to the President
11. Igor Levitin, Aide to the President
12. Vladimir Kozhin, Aide to the President
13. Yuri Ushakov, Aide to the President
14. Andrey Fursenko, Aide to the President
15. Nikolay Tsukanov, Aide to the President
16. Konstantin Chuychenko, Aide to the President
17. Evgeny Shkolov, Aide to the President
18. Igor Shchyogolev, Aide to the President
19. Alexander Bedritsky, Adviser to the President, Special Presidential Representative on Climate Issues
20. Sergey Glazyev, Adviser to the President
21. Sergey Grigorov, Adviser to the President
22. German Klimenko, Adviser to the President
23. Anton Kobyakov, Adviser to the President
24. Alexandra Levitskaya, Adviser to the President
25. Vladimir Tolstoy, Adviser to the President
26. Mikhail Fedotov, Adviser to the President, Chairman of the Presidential Council for Civil Society and Human Rights
27. Veniamin Yakovlev, Adviser to the President
28. Artur Muravyov, Presidential Envoy to the Federation Council
29. Garry Minkh, Presidential Envoy to the State Duma
30. Mikhail Krotov, Presidential Envoy to the Constitutional Court
31. Anna Kuznetsova, Presidential Commissioner for Children’s Rights
32. Boris Titov, Presidential Commissioner for Entrepreneurs’ Rights
33. Mikhail Babich, Plenipotentiary Representative to the Volga Federal District
34. Alexander Beglov, Plenipotentiary Representative to the Northwestern Federal District
35. Oleg Belaventsev, Plenipotentiary Representative to the North Caucasus Federal District
36. Aleksey Gordeyev, Plenipotentiary Representative to the Central Federal District
37. Sergey Menyaylo, Plenipotentiary Representative to the Siberian Federal District
38. Yuriy Trutnev, Deputy Prime Minister, Plenipotentiary Representative to the Far Eastern Federal District
39. Vladimir Ustinov, Plenipotentiary Representative to the Southern Federal District
40. Igor Kholmanskikh, Plenipotentiary Representative to the Urals Federal District
41. Aleksandr Manzhosin, Head, Foreign Policy Directorate
42. Vladimir Chemov, Head, Directorate for Interregional and Cultural Ties to Foreign Countries
43. Oleg Govorun, Head, Directorate for Social and Economic Relations with the Commonwealth of Independent States, Abkhazia, and South Ossetia

=== Cabinet ministers ===
1. Dmitry Medvedev, Prime Minister
2. Igor Shuvalov, First Deputy Prime Minister
3. Sergey Prikhodko, Deputy Prime Minister and Head of the Government Apparatus
4. Aleksandr Khloponin, Deputy Prime Minister
5. Vitaliy Mutko, Deputy Prime Minister
6. Arkady Dvorkovich, Deputy Prime Minister
7. Olga Golodets, Deputy Prime Minister
8. Dmitry Kozak, Deputy Prime Minister
9. Dmitriy Rogozin, Deputy Prime Minister
10. Mikhail Abyzov, Minister for Liaison with Open Government
11. Aleksandr Tkachev, Minister of Agriculture
12. Vladimir Puchkov, Minister of Civil Defense, Emergencies, and Natural Disasters
13. Nikolay Nikiforov, Minister of Communications and Mass Media
14. Mikhail Men, Minister of Construction, Housing, and Public Utilities
15. Vladimir Medinsky, Minister of Culture
16. Sergey Shoygu, Minister of Defense
17. Maxim Oreshkin, Minister of Economic Development
18. Olga Vasilyeva, Minister of Education and Science
19. Aleksandr Novak, Minister of Energy
20. Aleksandr Galushka, Minister of Far East Development
21. Anton Siluanov, Minister of Finance
22. Sergey Lavrov, Minister of Foreign Affairs
23. Veronika Skvortsova, Minister of Health
24. Denis Manturov, Minister of Industry and Trade
25. Vladimir Kolokoltsev, Minister of Internal Affairs
26. Aleksandr Konovalov, Minister of Justice
27. Maxim Topilin, Minister of Labor and Social Protection
28. Sergey Donskoy, Minister of Natural Resources and Ecology
29. Lev Kuznetsov, Minister of North Caucasus Affairs
30. Pavel Kolobkov, Minister of Sports
31. Maksim Sokolov, Minister of Transportation

=== Other senior political leaders ===
1. Valentina Matviyenko, Chairwoman, Federation Council
2. Sergey Naryshkin, Director, Foreign Intelligence Service (SVR)
3. Vyacheslav Volodin, Chairman, State Duma
4. Sergey Ivanov, Presidential Special Representative for the Environment, Ecology, and Transport
5. Nikolay Patrushev, Secretary, Security Council
6. Vladimir Bulavin, Head, Federal Customs Service
7. Valery Gerasimov, First Deputy Minister of Defense and Chief of the General Staff
8. Igor Korobov, Chief, Main Intelligence Directorate General Staff (GRU), Ministry of Defense
9. Rashid Nurgaliyev, Deputy Secretary, Security Council
10. Georgy Poltavchenko, Governor of Saint Petersburg
11. Sergey Sobyanin, Mayor of Moscow
12. Yury Chaika, Prosecutor General
13. Aleksandr Bastrykin, Head, Investigative Committee
14. Viktor Zolotov, Director, Federal National Guard Service
15. Dmitry Kochnev, Director, Federal Protection Service
16. Aleksandr Bortnikov, Director, Federal Security Service (FSB)
17. Andrei Artizov, Head, Federal Archive Agency
18. Yuriy Chikhanchin, Head, Financial Monitoring Federal Service
19. Aleksandr Linets, Head, Presidential Main Directorate for Special Programs
20. Aleksandr Kolpakov, Head, Presidential Property Management Directorate
21. Valeriy Tikhonov, Head, State Courier Service
22. Alexey Miller, Chief Executive Officer, Gazprom
23. Igor Sechin, Chief Executive Officer, Rosneft
24. German Gref, Chief Executive Officer, Sberbank
25. Oleg Belozerov, General Director, Russian Railways
26. Andrey Kostin, Chainnan Management Board, VTB
27. Sergey Chemezov, Chief Executive Officer, Rostec
28. Oleg Budargin, Chief Executive Officer, Rosseti
29. Boris Kovalchuk, Chief Executive Officer, Inter RAO
30. Alexey Likhachev, General Director, Rosatom
31. Nikolay Tokarev, Chief Executive Officer, Transneft
32. Andrey Akimov, Chief Executive Officer, Gazprombank
33. Nail Maganov, General Director, Tatneft
34. Vitaly Savelyev, Chief Executive Officer, Aeroflot
35. Andrey Shishkin, Chief Executive Officer, ANK Bashneft
36. Ymiy Slyusar, Chief Executive Officer, United Aircraft Corporation
37. Nikolay Shulginov, Chief Executive Officer, RusHydro
38. Sergey Gorkov, Chief Executive Officer, Vnesheconombank
39. Sergey Ivanov (Jr), Chief Executive Officer, ALROSA
40. Roman Dashkov, Chief Executive Officer, Sakhalin Energy

=== "Oligarchs" ===
1. Alexander Abramov
2. Roman Abramovich
3. Aras Agalarov
4. Farkhad Akhmedov
5. Vagit Alekperov
6. Igor Altushkin
7. Aleksey Ananyev
8. Dmitry Ananyev
9. Vasiliy Anisimov
10. Roman Avdeyev
11. Petr Aven
12. Yelena Baturina
13. Aleksey Bogachev
14. Vladimir Bogdanov
15. Leonid Boguslavskiy
16. Audrey Bokarev
17. Oleg Boyko
18. Nikolay Buynov
19. Oleg Deripaska
20. Aleksandr Dzhaparidze
21. Leonid Fedun
22. Gleb Fetisov
23. Mikhail Fridman
24. Aleksandr Frolov
25. Filaret Galchev
26. Sergey Galitsky
27. Valentin Gapontsev
28. Sergey Gordeyev
29. Andrey Guryev
30. Yuriy Gushchin
31. Mikhail Gutseriyev
32. Sait-Salam Gutseriyev
33. Zarakb Iliyev
34. Dmitriy Kamenshchik
35. Vyacheslav Kantor
36. Samvel Karapetyan
37. Yevgeny Kaspersky
38. Sergey Katsiyev
39. Suleyman Kerimov
40. Igor Kesayev
41. Danil Khachatmov
42. German Khan
43. Viktor Kharitonin
44. Alexander Klyachin
45. Petr Kondrashev
46. Andrey Kosogov
47. Yuriy Kovalchuk
48. Andrey Kozitsyn
49. Alexey Kuzmichev
50. Lev Kvetnoy
51. Vladimir Lisin
52. Anatoly Lomakin
53. Ziyavudin Magomedov
54. Igor Makarov
55. Iskander Makhmudov
56. Alexander Mamut
57. Andrey Melnichenko
58. Leonid Mikhelson
59. Yuri Milner
60. Boris Mints
61. Andrey Molchanov
62. Aleksey Mordashov
63. Vadim Moshkovich
64. Alexander Nesis
65. God Nisanov
66. Alexander Ponomarenko
67. Sergei Popov
68. Vladimir Potanin
69. Mikhail Prokhorov
70. Dmitriy Pumpyanskiy
71. Megdet Rakhimkulov
72. Andrey Rappoport
73. Viktor Rashnikov
74. Arkady Rotenberg
75. Boris Rotenberg
76. Dmitry Rybolovlev
77. Ayrat Shaymiyev
78. Radik Shaymiyev
79. Kirill Shamalov
80. Yuriy Sheller
81. Albert Shigabutdinov
82. Mikhail Shishkhanov
83. Leonid Simanovskiy
84. Andrei Skoch
85. Aleksandr Skorobogatko
86. Rustem Sulteyev
87. Alexander Svetakov
88. Gennadiy Timchenko
89. Oleg Tinkov
90. Roman Trotsenko
91. Alisher Usmanov
92. Viktor Vekselberg
93. Arkady Volozh
94. Vadim Yakunin
95. Vladimir Yevtushenkov
96. Gavril Yushvaev

== See also ==
- Presidential Administration of Russia
- Government of Russia
- State-owned enterprises of Russia
- Russian oligarchs
- List of Russian billionaires
