= Port of Murmansk =

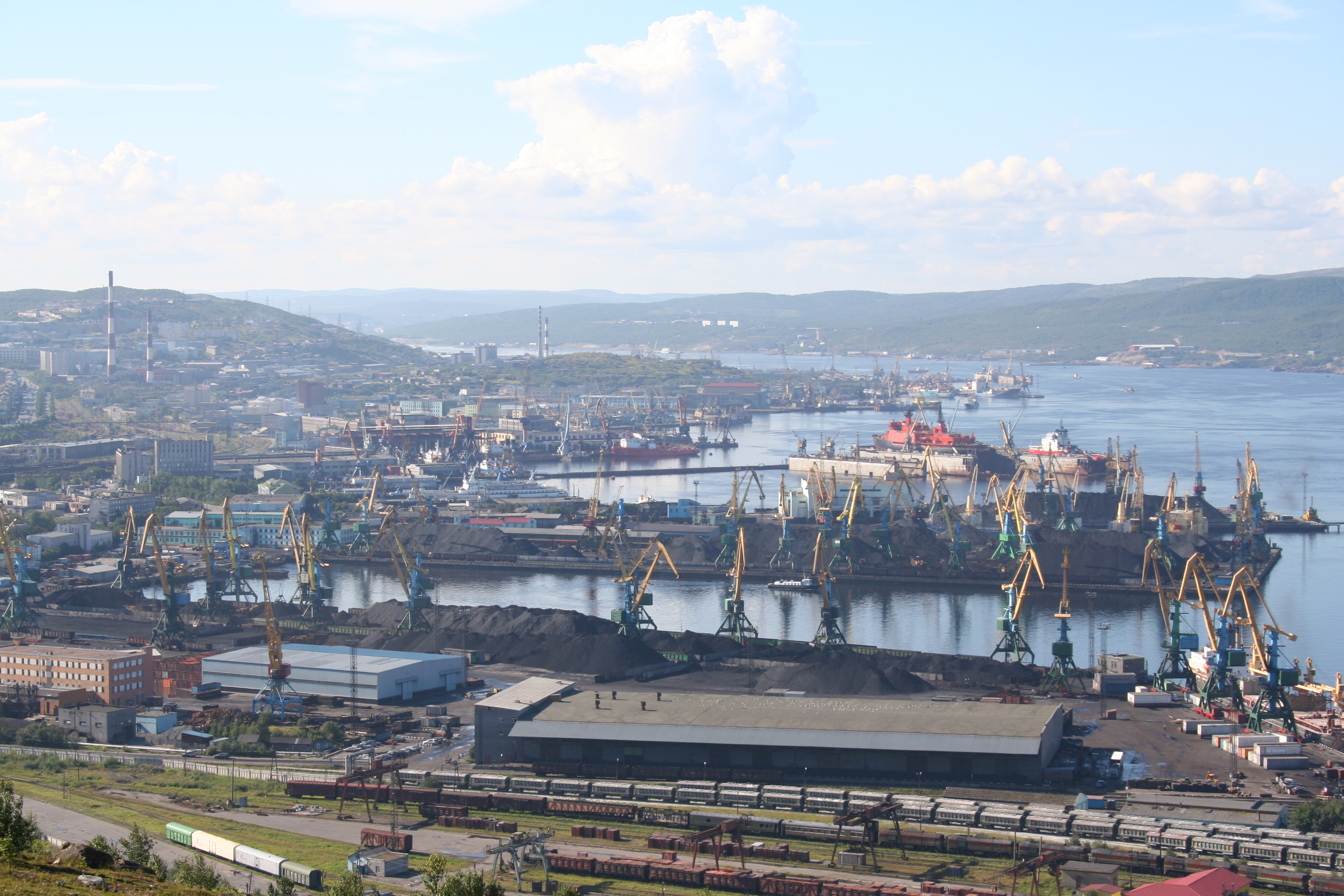
- View of the port
- Interactive map of Port of Murmansk
- Native name: Мурманский морской торговый порт

Location
- Country: Russia
- Location: Murmansk, Murmansk Oblast
- Coordinates: 68°58′48″N 33°03′22″E
- UN/LOCODE: RUMMK

Details
- Type of harbour: Sea
- Size of harbour: 53.699 км2
- Land area: 645.895 hec.
- Size: Medium

Statistics
- Website; The Port of Murmansk

Murmansk Commercial Seaport (Russian: Мурманский морской торговый порт) is a seaport located on the eastern shore of the Kola Bay of the Barents Sea in the city of Murmansk. The port ranks fourth in Russia in terms of processed goods and is the second-largest port in northwest Russia (after the port of St. Petersburg). Murmansk seaport is one of the largest ice-free ports in Russia and forms the backbone of the economy of the city. The Seaport has 13 berths and is equipped with modern handling facilities: 52 gantry cranes with a capacity up to 40 tons, 1 shiploader with the capacity more than 1000 tons/hour to handle apatite concentrate, 113 units of fork trucks with a capacity ranging from 1.5 to 32 tons. The port is managed and operated by JSC Murmansk Commercial Port. In April 2013, 49.86% of the shares were owned by SUEK (Siberian Coal Energy Company). As of January 2017, SUEK owns 75.47% share of the capital in the Murmansk Commercial Seaport. Another 22% stake is controlled by EuroChem. Both companies are controlled by Russian businessman Andrey Melnichenko.

== History ==
By the beginning of World War I, the only two Russian ports in the northwest were Arkhangelsk and St. Petersburg (later renamed Petrograd). However, after the blocking of the Ottoman Empire's straits of the Bosphorus and Dardanelles to outside shipping and blockading of the Baltic Sea port of St. Petersburg, the Russian Empire could only use the northern port of Arkhangelsk. This port had limitations: when winter presented itself, navigation and shipping of any sort came to a halt. Therefore, it was decided to build a new port. The chosen location was in Murmansk due to its ability to accommodate sea traffic year-round, proximity to existing communities and relative ease to connect it to the empire's expanding railway network.

The first planned work began in early July 1915 and, on September 1 of the same year the steamer "Drott" with a cargo from New York was able to moor to a temporary jetty port. The first train to the port arrived approximately one year after the railway was built to Kandalaksha.

=== Soviet period ===
After September 1, 1939, through the port of Murmansk started delivering cargo to Spain. During the Great Patriotic War took place in the port of unloading convoys of allied countries.

In 1966, the Murmansk seaport was awarded the Order of the Red Banner.

=== Modern period ===
In 1994, the Murmansk Commercial Seaport was established as a state-owned Joint Stock Company.

Murmansk Port is the homeport of the barque "Sedov", one of the largest sailing ships in the world. The Murmansk Shipping Company also operates the Russian nuclear-powered icebreaker fleet. In May 2007 it was decided to set up in Murmansk port free trade zone . On 15 October 2010 Murmansk was officially declared a special economic zone. The main goal was to create a powerful transport and trade infrastructure, attracting investment and ultimately social development.

Murmansk Port consists of three parts: the Fishing port, the commercial port and the passengers port. In recent years, there has been a trend of repression of all other trading ports because of an increase in exports of coal and a number of other mineral resources, which only Murmansk has the necessary reception and storage infrastructure. Intake of fish was also significantly reduced, as it became more profitable to export, rather than sell inside the country.

In the autumn of 2010, the Association of Commercial Seaports recognized Murmansk Port as the best Russian company to own the moorings and perform stevedoring work.

In February 2011, it was reported that the Gennady Timchenko group, one of the owners of the company Gunvor, had acquired Murmansk Commercial Seaport for $250 million. However, at the time of the report a spokesman for Timchenko denied the purchase had taken place.

In February 2012, SUEK, the largest coal mining company in Russia, purchased 24.9% of voting shares in the Murmansk Port for at a purported cost of $260 million. In 2013, multinational fertilizer company, EuroChem, finalized the acquisition of 48.26% of total ordinary shares and 36.2% of total issued share capital of the Murmansk Commercial Seaport. With a cost of 3.15 billion rubles, this purchase gave EuroChem 36.2% of the OJSC voting rights. The two companies, which are owned by Andrey Melnichenko, possess a combined 51% of the voting rights for the Seaport.

As of 2013, SUEK held a 37.49% stake in the voting shares of the port. In 2017, SUEK purchased a 25.5% stake of the Murmansk Seaport from EuroChem for 8.74 billion rubles, or $143 million. This deal brings SUEK's ownership stake up 75.47%, according to PortNews. After the deal, EuroChem possessed a remaining 22% of its shares of the Murmansk Commercial Seaport. The two companies, EuroChem and SUEK, are owned by Russian billionaire Andrey Melnichenko.

Since 2011, an investment project called "Integrated Development of the Murmansk transport hub" has been underway. Construction of the Murmansk transport hub began in 2013, with completion planned for 2020. It will enable Murmansk to be the main base of the Northern Sea Route and for the exploration of the Arctic.

By the end of 2012 cargo turnover had increased by 8.6% to 15.69 million tons, making Murmansk the second-largest cargo port in the northwestern part of Russia after the port of St. Petersburg. The Association of Russian Sea Ports estimates that Russian Arctic seaports handled 74.2 million tons of cargo in 2017, a 49.1% increase from 2016. The port of Murmansk accounted for almost two-thirds of the total turnover, with approximately 51.7 million tons of goods shipped through its harbor. This marked a 54.5% increase compared to 2016 shipping records. This growth has been attributed to the new Yamal LNG terminal and the planned Arctic LNG 2 projects.

Since the embargo on Russian oil exports, Murmansk port, in addition to Primorsk, Ust-Luga and Novorossiysk ports, is considered a main port for the Russian shadow fleet.
