= List of Europeans by net worth =

The list of Europeans by net worth is based on an annual assessment of wealth and assets compiled and published by Forbes magazine in 2022. In the same year, the continent of Europe had over 500 billionaires (in USD). The countries with the most billionaires are: Germany (134), Russia (83), Italy (52), France (49), the United Kingdom (49), Sweden (45) and Switzerland (41).

== Annual rankings ==
=== 2025 ===
Rank	Name	Net worth (USD)	Age	Country	Source(s) of wealth
1	Bernard Arnault	158 billion	74	France	LVMH
2	Françoise Bettencourt Meyers	80.5 billion	69	France	L'Oréal
3	Amancio Ortega	77.3 billion	87	Spain	Zara
4	Gopichand Hinduja	46.9 billion	84	United Kingdom	Hinduja Group
5	Dieter Schwarz	42.9 billion	83	Germany	Schwarz Gruppe
6	François Pinault	40.1 billion	86	France	Kering
7	Klaus-Michael Kühne	39.1 billion	85	Germany	Kühne & Nagel
8	Giovanni Ferrero	38.9 billion	57	Italy	Ferrero
9	Mark Mateschitz	34.7 billion	30	Austria	Red Bull
10=	Alain Wertheimer	31.6 billion	72	France	Chanel
10=	Gerard Wertheimer	31.6 billion	72	France	Chanel
11=	Gianluigi Aponte	31.2 billion	82	Switzerland	Mediterranean Shipping Company
11=	Rafaela Aponte-Diamant	31.2 billion	78	Switzerland	Mediterranean Shipping Company
12	Reinhold Würth	29.7 billion	87	Germany	Würth
13	Susanne Klatten	27.4 billion	60	Germany	BMW, Altana
14	Andrey Melnichenko	25.2 billion	51	Russia	EuroChem, SUEK
15	Stefan Quandt	24.6 billion	56	Germany	BMW
16	Vladimir Potanin	23.7 billion	62	Russia	Norilsk Nickel
17	James Ratcliffe	22.9 billion	70	United Kingdom	Ineos
18	Vladimir Lisin	22.1 billion	65	Russia	Novolipetsk Steel
19	Emmanuel Besnier	22.0 billion	52	France	Lactalis
20	Leonid Mikhelson	21.6 billion	67	Russia	Novatek
21	Alexei Mordashov	20.9 billion	67	Russia	Severstal
22	Vagit Alekperov	20.5 billion	72	Russia	Lukoil
23	Lakshmi Mittal	20.1 billion	74	United Kingdom	ArcelorMittal
23=	Gennady Timchenko	18.5 billion	70	Russia	Novatek, Sibur Holding
23=	Theo Albrecht Jr.	16.5 billion	72	Germany	Aldi Nord, Trader Joe's
24	Renata Kellnerova	16.5 billion	55	Czech Republic	PPF
25	Stefan Persson	16.2 billion	75	Sweden	H&M
26	Michael Platt	16.0 billion	54	United Kingdom	BlueCrest Capital
27=	Karl Albrecht Jr.	15.8 billion	N/A	Germany	Aldi Süd, Trader Joe's
27=	Beate Heister	15.8 billion	N/A	Germany	Aldi Süd, Trader Joe's

=== 2022 ===
Rank	Name	Net worth (USD)	Age	Country	Source(s) of wealth
1	Bernard Arnault	158.0 billion	73	France	LVMH
2	Françoise Bettencourt Meyers	74.8 billion	68	France	L'Oréal
3	Amancio Ortega	59.6 billion	86	Spain	Zara
4	Dieter Schwarz	47.1 billion	82	Germany	Schwarz Gruppe
5	Rodolphe Saadé	41.4 billion	52	France	CMA CGM
6	François Pinault	37.3 billion	84	France	Kering
7	Klaus-Michael Kühne	36.8 billion	84	Germany	Kühne & Nagel
8	Beate Heister & Karl Albrecht Jr.	37.3 billion	70/73	Germany	Aldi Süd
9	Giovanni Ferrero	36.2 billion	57	Italy	Ferrero
10	Alain Wertheimer	31.2 billion	73	France	Chanel
10	Gerard Wertheimer	31.2 billion	71	France	Chanel
12	Dietrich Mateschitz	27.4 billion	77	Austria	Red Bull
13	Leonardo Del Vecchio	27.3 billion	86	Italy	Luxottica
14	Susanne Klatten	24.3 billion	59	Germany	BMW, Altana
15	Emmanuel Besnier	23.5 billion	51	France	Lactalis
16	Guillaume Pousaz	23.0 billion	40	Switzerland	Checkout.com
17	Stefan Quandt	20.7 billion	55	Germany	BMW
18	Reinhold Würth	19.0 billion	86	Germany	Würth
19	Theo Albrecht Jr.	18.7 billion	71	Germany	Aldi Nord, Trader Joe's
20	Vladimir Lisin	18.4 billion	65	Russia	Novolipetsk Steel
21	Stefan Persson	17.3 billion	74	Sweden	H&M
22	Gianluigi & Rafaela Aponte	16.8 billion	81	Switzerland	Mediterranean Shipping Company
23	Renata Kellnerova	16.6 billion	54	Czech Republic	PPF
24	James Ratcliffe	17.0 billion	69	United Kingdom	Ineos
25	Charlene de Carvalho-Heineken	15.2 billion	67	Netherlands	Heineken
25	Michael Platt	15.2 billion	54	United Kingdom	BlueCrest Capital
27	Pavel Durov	15.1 billion	37	Russia	Telegram
28	Pallonji Mistry	15.0 billion	92	Ireland	Shapoorji Pallonji Group
29	Leonid Mikhelson	14.0 billion	66	Russia	Novatek
30	Anders Holch Povlsen	13.6 billion	49	Denmark	Bestseller

=== 2021 ===
Rank	Name	Net worth (USD):	Age	Country	Source(s) of wealth
1	Bernard Arnault	198.9 billion	72	France	LVMH
2	Amancio Ortega	77.0 billion	85	Spain	Zara
3	Françoise Bettencourt Meyers	73.6 billion	67	France	L'Oréal
4	François Pinault	42.3 billion	84	France	Kering
5	Beate Heister & Karl Albrecht Jr.	39.2 billion	69/72	Germany	Aldi Sud
6	Dieter Schwarz	36.9 billion	81	Germany	Schwarz Gruppe
7	Giovanni Ferrero	35.1 billion	56	Italy	Ferrero SpA
8	Len Blavatnik	32.0 billion	63	United Kingdom	Access Industries
9	Alexei Mordashov	29.1 billion	55	Russia	Severstal
10	Susanne Klatten	27.7 billion	58	Germany	BMW, Altana
11	Vladimir Potanin	27.0 billion	60	Russia	Interros
12	Dietrich Mateschitz	26.9 billion	76	Austria	Red Bull
13	Klaus-Michael Kühne	26.3 billion	83	Germany	Kühne & Nagel
14	Vladimir Lisin	26.2 billion	64	Russia	Novolipetsk Steel
15	Leonardo Del Vecchio	25.8 billion	85	Italy	Luxottica
16	Leonid Mikhelson	24.9 billion	65	Russia	Novatek
17	Vagit Alekperov	24.9 billion	70	Russia	Lukoil
18	Gennady Timchenko	22.0 billion	68	Russia	Volga Group
19	Stefan Quandt	21.6 billion	54	Germany	BMW
20	Stefan Persson	21.3 billion	73	Sweden	H&M
21	Emmanuel Besnier	19.1 billion	50	France	Lactalis
22	Theo Albrecht Jr.	18.8 billion	70	Germany	Aldi Nord, Trader Joe's
23	Alisher Usmanov	18.4 billion	67	Russia	Metalloinvest
24	Andrey Melnichenko	17.9 billion	49	Russia	EuroChem, SUEK
25	Petr Kellner	17.5 billion	56	Czech Republic	PPF
26	James Ratcliffe	17.0 billion	68	United Kingdom	Ineos
27	Reinhold Würth	16.8 billion	85	Germany	Würth
28	Charlene de Carvalho-Heineken	16.7 billion	66	Netherlands	Heineken
29	Suleyman Kerimov	15.8 billion	55	Russia	Polyus
30	Mikhail Fridman	15.5 billion	56	Russia	Alfa Group

=== 2019 ===
Rank	Name	Net worth (USD):	Age	Country	Source(s) of wealth
1	Bernard Arnault	96.1 billion	70	France	LVMH
2	Amancio Ortega	68.5 billion	83	Spain	Zara
3	Françoise Bettencourt Meyers	49.3 billion	65	France	L'Oréal
4	Beate Heister & Karl Albrecht Jr.	36.1 billion	67/71	Germany	Aldi Sud
5	François Pinault	29.7 billion	82	France	Kering
6	Leonid Mikhelson	24.0 billion	63	Russia	Novatek
7	Dieter Schwarz	22.9 billion	79	Germany	Schwarz Gruppe
8	Giovanni Ferrero	22.4 billion	54	Italy	Ferrero SpA
9	Vladimir Lisin	21.3 billion	63	Russia	Novolipetsk Steel
10	Susanne Klatten	21.0 billion	57	Germany	BMW, Altana
11	Vagit Alekperov	20.7 billion	68	Russia	Lukoil
12	Alexei Mordashov	20.5 billion	53	Russia	Severstal
13	Gennady Timchenko	20.1 billion	66	Russia	Volga Group
14	Leonardo Del Vecchio	19.8 billion	84	Italy	Luxottica
15	Dietrich Mateschitz	18.9 billion	75	Austria	Red Bull
16	Vladimir Potanin	18.1 billion	58	Russia	Interros
17	Stefan Quandt	17.5 billion	53	Germany	BMW
18	Theo Albrecht Jr.	17.4 billion	68	Germany	Aldi Nord, Trader Joe's
19	Hinduja brothers	16.9 billion	-	United Kingdom	Hinduja Group
20	Stefan Persson	15.6 billion	71	Sweden	H&M
21	Petr Kellner	15.5 billion	55	Czech Republic	PPF
22	Mikhail Fridman	15.0 billion	55	Russia	Alfa Group
22	Pallonji Mistry	15.0 billion	90	Ireland	Shapoorji Pallonji Group
24	Alain Wertheimer	14.6 billion	70	France	Chanel
24	Gérard Wertheimer	14.6 billion	68	France	Chanel
26	Emmanuel Besnier	14.3 billion	48	France	Lactalis
27	Charlene de Carvalho-Heineken	14.2 billion	65	Netherlands	Heineken
28	Andrey Melnichenko	13.8 billion	47	Russia	EuroChem, SUEK
28	Heinz Hermann Thiele	13.8 billion	78	Germany	Vossloh
30	Hasso Plattner	13.5 billion	75	Germany	SAP SE

== See also ==
- Lists of billionaires
- List of countries by the number of billionaires
