= Aleksandra Melnichenko =

Serbian former singer and model (born 1977)

- Александра Мељниченко
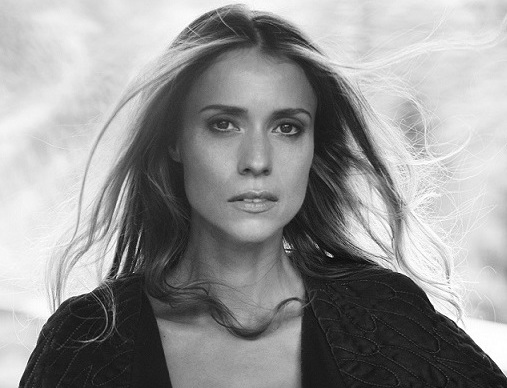
- Aleksandra Melnichenko
- Born: Aleksandra Nikolić; 21 April 1977 (age 49); Belgrade, SR Serbia, SFR Yugoslavia
- Other name: Sandra Meljničenko
- Occupations: Singer; model
- Spouse: Andrey Melnichenko (m. 2005)
- Children: 2
- Musical career
- Genres: Pop
- Instrument: Vocals
- Years active: 1997–2001
- Label: City Records

Aleksandra Melnichenko (née Nikolić; Serbian: Александра Мељниченко, née Николић, romanized: Aleksandra Meljničenko; born 21 April 1977), also known as Sandra Meljničenko (Serbian Cyrillic: Сандра Мељниченко), is a Serbian philanthropist and a former singer and model. She is married to the Russian billionaire entrepreneur Andrey Melnichenko.

== Early life ==
Aleksandra "Sandra" Nikolić was born and grew up in Belgrade, the capital of former Yugoslavia, to a Serbian father and a Croatian mother. Her father was an architectural engineer and her mother was an artist. Since the breakup of Yugoslavia, Aleksandra has held both Serbian and Croatian citizenship.

Sandra was educated at the 11th Belgrade Gymnasium, before enrolling in the Faculty of International Management in Belgrade.

== Career ==
At the age of 15, while still in high school and before enrolling into Belgrade University's Faculty of Management, Aleksandra launched herself into a successful first career in fashion, winning international recognition as a model and, from 1996, regional fame as a member of the original cast of the Balkans' leading girl band Models. She returned to full-time modelling in 1998, working with leading international agencies while living in Europe's fashion capitals.

Aleksandra Melnichenko has focused on philanthropy, mainly supporting children's education and the arts. Over time, the family's foundation and the companies the Melnichenko family invested in have donated nearly US$500 million to charity.

== Personal life ==
In 2003, in France, Aleksandra met entrepreneur and investor Andrey Melnichenko. The couple married two years after their first meeting, in September 2005, and started to spend an international life between different continents and countries.

Aleksandra and Andrey have since welcomed a daughter (2012) and a son (2017).

Aleksandra and Andrey Melnichenko own two superyachts designed by Philippe Starck: Sailing Yacht A and Motor Yacht A, which reportedly cost $500 million and $350 million to build, respectively, and are considered to be "one of the most advanced superyachts on the water" with "environmentally-friendly innovations."

In 2023, Serbian singer Sara Jo collaborated with Serbian rapper Mimi Mercedez on a track called "Sandra Meljničenko", after Aleksandra. The track was included on Jo's debut album Bez kontrole that was released on 21 June of the same year.
