= List of Russian billionaires =

Annual ranking by net worth by Forbes magazine

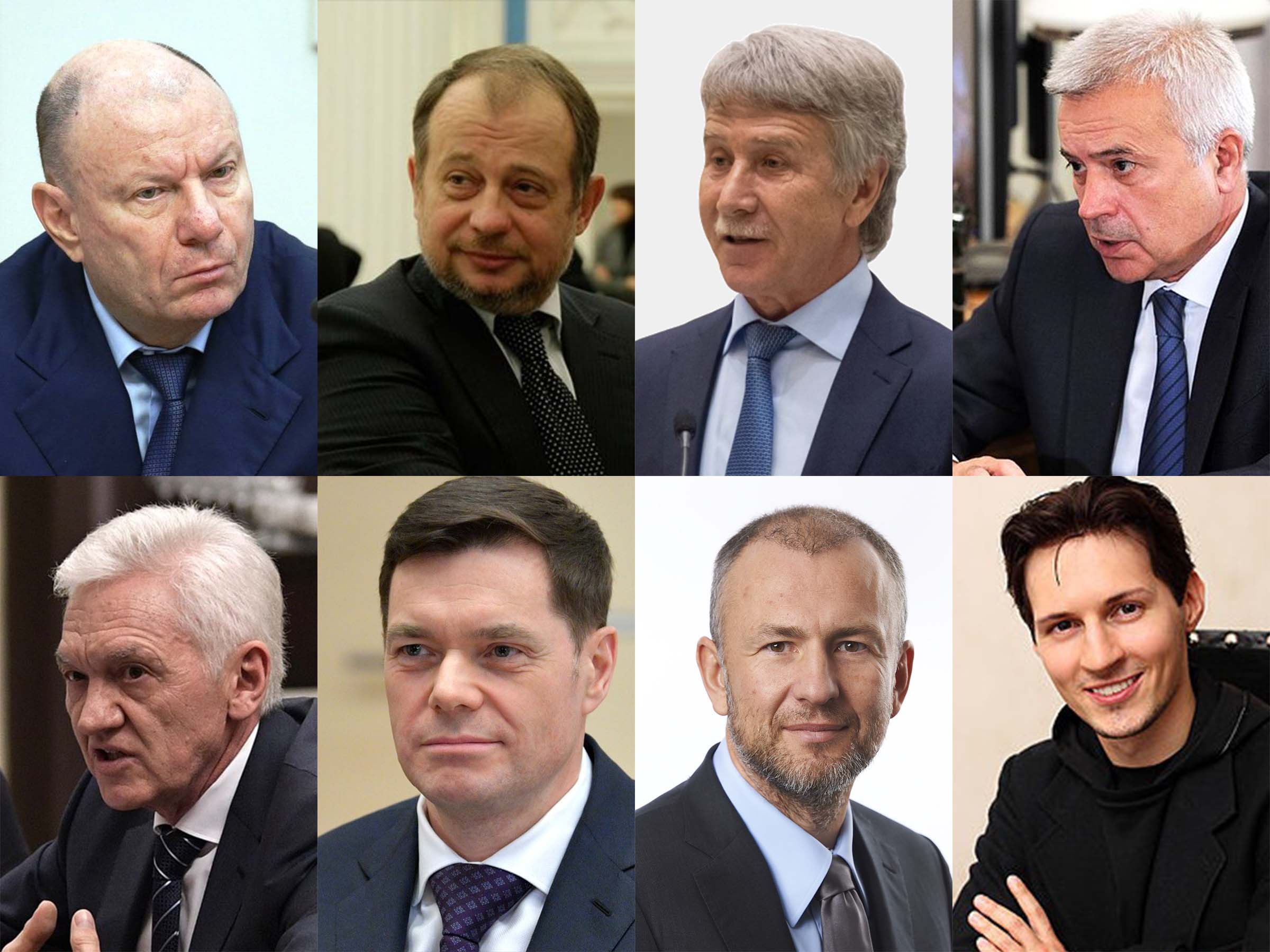
Some Russian billionaires as of March 2022 (see § Current list)

This is a ranking list of Russian billionaires. The following is based on the annual estimated wealth and assets assessment compiled and published by American business magazine Forbes. As of 2025, the wealth of 140 people surpasses $1 billion, marking a significant increase from 83 people in 2022.

== Methodology ==
As was reported by Forbes in 2012, the World's Billionaires ranking is compiled based on the data provided by more than 50 reporters working in 16 countries throughout the year. The reporters arrange interviews with the candidates, interview the employees, attorneys, and securities analysts, and keep track of candidates' deals. The net worth is estimated based on individuals' assets, such as stakes in public and private companies, yachts, art, and real estate. Interviews are conducted to vet the figures and improve the estimate of an individual's holdings. Positions in a publicly traded stock are priced to market on a date roughly a month before publication. For example, the 2022 ranking relies on the stock prices and exchange rates as of March 11, 2022. Privately held companies are priced by the prevailing price-to-sales or price-to-earnings ratios. Known debt is subtracted from assets to get a final estimate of an individual's estimated worth in United States dollars. Since stock prices fluctuate rapidly, an individual's true wealth and ranking at the time of publication may vary from their situation when the list was compiled.

The Forbes policy is not to list multigenerational families who share fortunes. Still, in some cases, it lists couples and/or siblings together if the ownership breakdown among them is not clear. However, an estimated net worth of $1 billion should be calculated per person. If the wealth could be traced to one living individual, the Forbes includes wealth belonging to a member's immediate relatives. Royal families and dictators that have their wealth contingent on a position are always excluded from the rankings.

== 2022 list ==
The billionaires are listed as follows, including their rank in Russia (R#) and world rank (W#), citizenship, age, net worth, and source of wealth:

R#	W#	Name	Image	Citizenship	Age (y.o.)	Net worth (billions of USD)	Source of wealth	Ref.
1	87	Vladimir Lisin		Russia	69	▼18.4 –US$7.8B	Iron & steel industry	
2	97	Vladimir Potanin		Russia	65	▼17.3 –US$9.7B	Metals	
3	123	Pavel Durov		Russia; Saint Kitts and Nevis; France; United Arab Emirates	41	▼15.1 –US$2.1B	Software: Telegram	
4	130	Leonid Mikhelson		Russia; Israel	70	▼14 –US$10.9B	Oil & gas industry and chemical industry	
5	138	Alexei Mordashov		Russia	60	▼13.2 –US$15.9B	Iron & steel industry	
6	161	Mikhail Fridman		Russia; Israel	61	▼11.8 –US$3.7B	Oil & gas industry, banking, telecom, and investments in the privatization of Russia	
7	161	Alisher Usmanov		Russia	72	▼11.5 –US$6.9B	Steel, telecom, and investments in the privatization of Russia	
8	173	Gennady Timchenko		Russia; Finland; Armenia	73	▼11.3 –US$10.7B	Oil & gas industry and investments in the privatization of Russia	
9	177	Andrey Melnichenko		Russia; United Arab Emirates	54	▼11.1 –US$6.8B	Coal industry and fertilizer	
10	188	Vagit Alekperov		Russia; Azerbaijan	75	▼10.5 –US$14.4B	Oil	
11	192	Mikhail Prokhorov		Russia; Israel	60	▼10.3 –US$1.1B	Investments in the privatization of Russia	
12	296	German Khan		Ukraine; Russia; Israel	64	▼7.8 –US$2.3B	Oil, banking, telecom	
13	350	Roman Abramovich		Russia; Israel; Portugal	59	▼6.9 –US$7.6B	Steel, Investments in the privatization of Russia	
14	375	Viktor Rashnikov		Russia	77	▼6.6 –US$4.6B	Steel industry	
15	375	Dmitry Rybolovlev		Russia; Cyprus	59	▼6.6 –US$0.1B	Fertilizer	
16	424	Alexey Kuzmichev		Russia	63	▼6 –US$1.8B	Oil, banking, telekom	
17	480	Alexander Abramov		Russia; Cyprus	67	▼5.5 –US$2.1B	Steel, mining	
18	480	Viktor Vekselberg		Russia; Cyprus	68	▼5.5 –US$3.5B	Metals, energy	
19	552	Leonid Fedun		Russia	70	▼5 –US$6.1B	Oil	
20	586	Andrey Guryev & family		Russia	66	▼4.8 –US$1.2B	Fertilizer	
22	601	Andrei Skoch & family		Russia	60	▼4.7 -US$3.9B	Steel	
23	622	Viatcheslav Moshe Kantor		Russia; United Kingdom; Israel	72	▲4.6 +US$0.1B	Fertilizer, real estate	
24	654	Suleyman Kerimov & family		Russia	60	▼4.4 -US$11.4B	Gold	
25	665	Petr Aven		Russia	71	▼4.3 -US$1.0B	Oil, banking, telecom	
26	709	Sergey Dmitriev		Russia	60	▲4.1 +US$0.3B	Co-founder of the software company JetBrains	
27	822	Iskander Makhmudov		Russia	62	▼3.6 -US$6.1B	Mining, metals, machinery	
28	951	Sergey Galitsky		Russia	58	▼3.2 -US$0.3B	Retail	
29	984	Sergei Popov		Russia	54	▼3.1 -US$1.4B	Retail	
30	1053	Valentin Kipyatkov		Russia	49	▲2.9 +US$0.2B	Co-founder of the software company JetBrains	
31	1196	Igor Kesaev		Russia	59	▼2.6 -US$1.4B	Retail, tobacco distribution	
32	1341	Aleksandr Frolov		Russia	61	▼2.3 -US$1.1B	Mining, steel	
33	1397	Alexander Svetakov		Russia	58	▲2.2 +US$0.2B	Real estate	
34	1445	Tatyana Bakalchuk		Russia	50	▼2.1 -US$10.9B	Ecommerce	
35	1445	Igor Makarov		Russia	64	2.1	Investments	
36	1445	Alexander Mamut		Russia; Israel	66	▼2.1 -US$0.2B	Investments	
37	1513	Egor Kulkov		Russia	54	2	Founder of the Pharmstandard	
38	1513	Aleksandr Skorobogatko		Russia	58	▼2 -US$0.9B	Real estate, airport	
39	1579	Andrei Kozitsyn		Russia	65	▼1.9 -US$4.4B	Metals	
40	1579	Alexander Nesis		Russia; Israel; Malta	63	▼1.9 -US$1B	Metals, banking, fertilizers	
41	1579	Alexander Ponomarenko		Russia; Cyprus	61	▼2.9 -US$1B	Real estate, airport	
42	1645	Igor Altushkin		Russia	55	▼1.8 -US$5.2B	Metals	
43	1729	Farkhad Akhmedov		Russia	70	▲1.7 +US$0.3B	Investments	
44	1729	Oleg Deripaska		Russia; Cyprus	58	▼1.7 -US$1.7B	Aluminium, utilities	
45	1729	Dmitry Kamenshchik		Russia	57	▼1.7 -US$0.1B	Airport	
46	1729	Arkady Rotenberg		Russia	74	▼1.7 -US$1.2B	Construction, pipes, banking	
47	1729	Vladimir Yevtushenkov		Russia	77	▼1.7 -US$1.7B	Telecom, investments	
48	1818	Vasily Anisimov		Russia	74	▼1.6 -US$0.1B	Real estate	
49	1818	Sergei Gordeev		Russia	53	▼1.6 -US$2.2B	Real estate	
50	1818	Ivan Savvidis		Russia	67	▼1.6 -US$0.1B	Agribusiness	
51	1929	Nikolai Buinov		Russia	58	▼1.5 -US$0.7B	Oil, gas	
52	1929	Pyotr Kondrashev		Russia	76	1.5	Investments	
53	1929	Yuri Shefler		Russia; United Kingdom; Israel	58	▼1.5 -US$1.1B	Alcohol	
54	1929	Mikhail Shelkov		Russia	57	▼1.5 -US$0.5B	Titanium	
55	2076	Yelena Baturina		Russia	63	▲1.4 +US$0.1B	Investment, real estate	
56	2076	Viktor Kharitonin		Russia	53	▼1.4 -US$2B	Pharmaceuticals	
57	2076	Anatoly Lomakin		Russia	73	1.4	Investments	
58	2076	Vadim Moshkovich		Russia	59	▼1.4 -US$1B	Agriculture, land	
59	2076	Alexey Repik		Russia	46	▼1.4 -US$1.2B	Pharmaceuticals	
60	2076	Denis Sverdlov		Russia	47	1.4	Electric vehicles, founder of Arrival	
61	2076	Gavril Yushvaev		Russia; Israel	68	1.4	Precious metals, real estate	
62	2190	Oleg Boyko		Russia	61	1.3	Diversified	
63	2190	Mikhail Gutseriev & brother		Russia	68	▼1.3 -US$1.2B	Oil, retail, estate	
64	2190	Zarakh Iliev		Russia	59	▼1.3 -US$2.1B	Real estate	
65	2190	Yury Kovalchuk		Russia	74	▼1.3 -US$2.1B	Banking, insurance, media	
66	2190	God Nisanov		Russia	53	▼1.3 -US$2.1B	Real estate	
67	2190	Albert Shigaboutdinov		Russia	73	▲1.3 +US$0.1B	Refinery, chemicals	
68	2190	Ruben Vardanyan		Russia (Former); Armenia	57	▲1.3 +US$0.0B	Banking, Education, Philanthropy	
69	2324	Andrei Bokarev		Russia	59	1.2	Metals, mining	
70	2324	Gleb Fetisov		Russia	59	1.2	Investments	
71	2324	Andrei Kosogov		Russia	65	▼1.2 -US$0.2B	Banking	
72	2324	Megdet Rahimkulov & family		Russia	80	▼1.2 -US$0.5B	Investments	
73	2324	Andrei Rappoport		Russia	62	1.2	Investments	
74	2324	Airat Shaimiev		Russia	64	▼1.2 -US$0.2B	Refinery, chemicals	
75	2324	Radik Shaimiev		Russia	61	▼1.2 -US$0.1B	Investments	
76	2448	Samvel Karapetyan		Russia	60	▼1.1 -US$2.2B	Real estate	
77	2448	Sergei Kolesnikov		Russia	54	▼1.1 -US$0.9B	Building materials	
78	2449	Andrei Komarov		Russia	59	▼1.1 -US$0.1B	Investments	
79	2448	Igor Rybakov		Russia	53	▼1.1 -US$0.9B	Building materials	
80	2448	Igor Yusufov		Russia	69	1.1	Oil and gas	
81	2448	Eugene Kaspersky		Russia	60	▼1 -US$0.2B	Software	
82	2578	Boris Rotenberg		Russia; Finland	69	▼1 -US$0.2B	Construction, pipes, chemicals	

== See also ==
- The World's Billionaires
- List of countries by the number of billionaires
- Russian asset tracker
