= Samir Brikho =

Swedish-Lebanese businessman (born 1958)

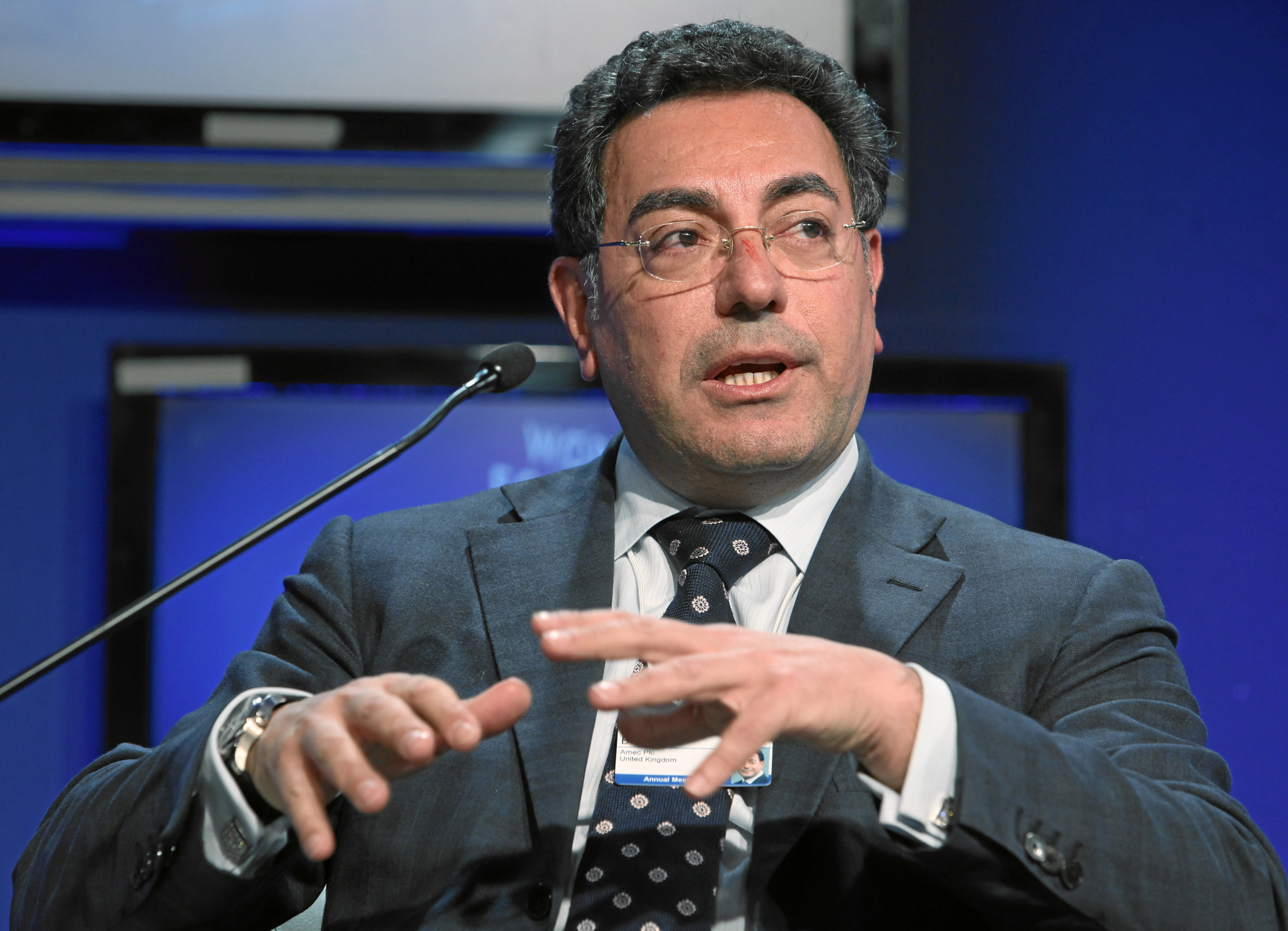
- Samir Brikho at the World Economic Forum Annual Meeting in 2010
- Born: Samir Yacoub Brikho; 3 May 1958 (age 68); Beirut, Lebanon
- Education: Royal Institute of Technology, Stockholm, INSEAD and Stanford
- Occupation: Businessman
- Title: Chairman of the Board of Advisors, OnTech Group

Samir Yacoub Brikho FREng (born 3 May 1958) is a Lebanese-Swedish global businessman. He served as the Executive Chairman at fertilizer producer EuroChem Group AG, Chairman of the Board of Directors of SUEK AG, Chief Executive Officer of Amec Foster Wheeler, and other senior executive roles at ABB and ALSTOM.

== Biography ==
Born in Beirut on 3 May 1958, Brikho is Lebanese by birth but his family later moved to Sweden, where he holds citizenship. Brikho holds a Master of Science degree in Thermal Technology from the Royal Institute of Technology in Stockholm, Sweden. He is also a graduate of the Young Managers Programme at INSEAD and the Senior Executive Programme at Stanford University.

Brikho held various senior management positions at Asea and ABB Power Generation between 1983 and 2000, ultimately becoming a senior vice president and global managing director, steam turbines and generators, ABB Kraftwerke AG in Germany. In 2000, he moved to Alstom, where he was chief international operations officer and senior vice-president, and CEO of Alstom Kraftwerke in Germany.

In 2003 he became chief executive of ABB Lummus Global, and in 2005 he became a member of the group executive committee of ABB Ltd, head of the Power Systems Division at ABB Group.

He went on to be chief executive of Amec Foster Wheeler (formerly Amec) in October 2006. The company's share price rose from under 400 pence when he assumed the role of CEO in October 2006, to over 1,200 pence in June 2014. He served until 18 January 2016 and was succeeded by Ian McHoul, the chief financial officer.

On 19 December 2019, Eurochem Group AG, a large fertilizer producer, announced that Brikho would be assuming the role of Chairman of the Board of Directors, effective from 1 January 2020. He left his role as Executive Chairman of the Board of Directors of Eurochem Group AG in July 2024.

From 2020 to June 2023, Samir also held the position of Chairman of the Board of Directors of SUEK, one of the world's largest coal mining and production businesses.

== Awards and commendations ==
On 16 October 2009, Brikho was presented with the Medal of Honour for Industrial Service by South Korean President Lee Myung-bak for his contributions to enhancing economic competitiveness in Korea through successful completion of the Incheon Bridge project.

Since being appointed by Prime Minister Gordon Brown in February 2010, reconfirmed under David Cameron's coalition government, and again under Theresa May, Brikho served as a UK Business Ambassador to support successive British Governments in promoting the UK's excellence internationally, until the programme's cancellation in December 2018.

In July 2013 Mr Brikho was elected as a Fellow of the Royal Academy of Engineering. In June 2015, Brikho received an honorary doctorate from Cranfield University.

== Other affiliations ==
Brikho was a member of the advisory board of Stena AB and was a non-executive director of Skandinaviska Enskilda Banken. He acted as co-chair of the UK-UAE CEO Forum and co-chair of the UK-Korea CEO Forum. He was chairman of the Offshore Europe 2011 Conference, the largest upstream oil and gas event outside North America.

Brikho was chairman and co-founder of the StepChange Foundation. Brikho was the 2009 Chair of the World Economic Forum's Engineering and Construction Board, has held the role of chair of the World Economic Forum's Disaster Resource Partnership and is currently co-chair of the World Economic Forum's Infrastructure & Urban Development Industries Committee. Brikho was chair of the UK Energy Excellence Strategy Board, from May 2008 to May 2010, which was tasked by the UK Government with demonstrating the UK's world-leading position in energy. Samir was also a director of the United Kingdom-Japan 21st Century Group, a member of the advisory board of LIFE Lebanon and a member of the advisory board of the School of Oriental and African Studies. He is a founding member of the Palestine International Business Forum, a body formed to promote trade and business relations between Israeli and Palestinian private sectors and the International business community.
