= A (sailing yacht) =

Sail-assisted motor yacht built in Kiel by Nobiskrug

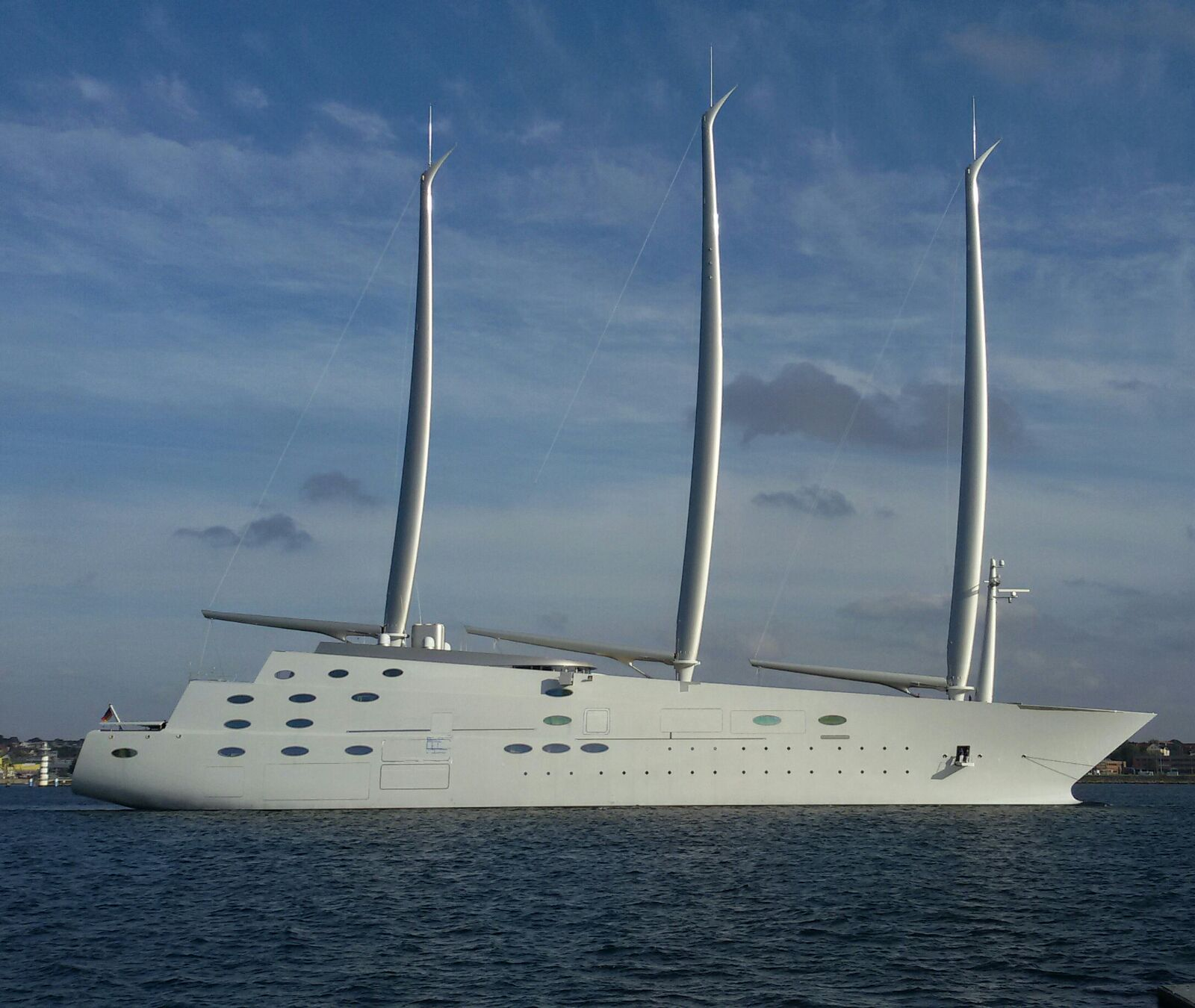
- Sailing yacht A, starboard

History
- Name: A
- Namesake: A
- Owner: Andrey Melnichenko
- Port of registry: (Sierra Leone) Freetown
- Ordered: March 2011
- Builder: Nobiskrug, Kiel, Germany
- Yard number: 787
- Laid down: 17 August 2012
- Launched: 27 January 2017
- In service: 3 February 2017
- Identification: IMO number: 1012141
- Status: In service, seized by authorities

General characteristics
- Type: Superyacht
- Tonnage: 12,558 GT
- Length: 144.03 m (472 ft 6 in)
- Beam: 24.80 m (81 ft 4 in)
- Height: 100.00 m (328 ft 1 in)
- Draught: 8.00 m (26 ft 3 in)
- Decks: 7
- Installed power: Variable-speed diesel-electric plant
- Propulsion: Lineshaft controllable-pitch twin screw
- Sail plan: 3,747 m^{2} (40,330 sq ft) 3-mast schooner rig
- Speed: 21 knots (39 km/h; 24 mph) max
- Range: 5,340 nmi (9,890 km; 6,150 mi)
- Crew: 54

The sailing yacht A is a superyacht that was launched in 2017. The vessel is a sail-assisted motor yacht designed by Philippe Starck (exteriors and interiors) and built by Nobiskrug in Kiel, Germany for the Russian billionaire Andrey Melnichenko.

== Design and construction ==
The vessel was constructed by Nobiskrug at their shipyard in Kiel, Germany with architecture by Nobiskrug & Dykstra Naval Architects and an interior/exterior design by Philippe Starck. A measures 12,558 gross tonnage (GT) with a 3,767 net tonnage (NT) and 1,458 tons deadweight (DWT). The vessel has a length overall of 144.03 metres (472 ft 6 in), a length between perpendiculars of 118.63 m (389 ft 2 in), a beam of 24.80 m (81 ft 4 in) and a draught of 8.00 m (26 ft 3 in). The yacht has a moulded depth of 8.9 m (29 ft 2 in) and seven decks. (Note: The Nobiskrug website gives the dimensions of the yacht as 142.81 m (468 ft 6 in) long overall with a beam of 24.88 m (81 ft 8 in), while Boat International claims the vessel has eight decks.) The vessel has accommodation for 20 guests and a crew of 54.

Its propulsion consists of a variable-speed hybrid powerplant consisting of two MTU 20V 4000 M73L lineshaft diesel engines creating 3,600 kW (4,800 hp) at 2,050 rpm with a superimposable/clutched diesel-electric transmission controlled by DEIF systems turning two lineshaft controllable-pitch propellers. A three-masted fore-and-aft sailing rig provides power assistance. The freestanding, carbon-fiber rotating masts were manufactured by Magma Structures at Trafalgar Wharf, Portsmouth, with the mainmast standing 100 m (328 ft 1 in) in height. Doyle Sailmakers USA manufactured the three fully automated carbonfibre/taffeta full roach sails. The total sail area is 3,747 square metres (40,330 sq ft). The furling booms were built in Valencia by Future Fibres. The rigging of the yacht was developed partially to be implemented on cargo ships and for commercial use. The vessel features an underwater observation pod in the keel with 30-centimetre (12 in)-thick glass. It is the largest private sail-assisted motor yacht in the world.

Electricity is created by four 1,050–2,050 rpm 2,800 kW hotel generators driving two Vacon 4,300 kW lineshaft motors Emissions are treated by four Emigreen diesel particulate filters (soot filtration) on the diesel generators. A has a maximum speed of 21 knots (39 km/h; 24 mph) and a range of 5,340 nautical miles (9,890 km; 6,150 mi) at a cruising speed of 16 knots (30 km/h; 18 mph).

== History ==
Russian billionaire Andrey Melnichenko sought to move on from his previous yacht project, the motor yacht A, to a new design. Working with Starck and project manager Dirk Kloosterman, development of the yacht began in March 2011 and the keel was laid down on 17 August 2012. A was launched on 27 January 2017 and delivered by Nobiskrug on 3 February 2017. The vessel left Kiel on 5 February 2017 and exited the Baltic Sea in light mode on near-empty fuel tanks so to clear the Drogden channel in the Danish straits with minimum draught. It underwent final sea trials and the final fit-out at the Navantia shipyard in Cartagena, Spain. Boat International called it "the boundary pushing superyacht". The yacht is owned by Melnichenko through Valla Yachts Ltd. of Bermuda, and was initially registered there at Hamilton. In December 2021 the yacht was moved to the Isle of Man flag and registered at Douglas.

The yacht was seized by the Italian Guardia di Finanza on 12 March 2022 in the port of Trieste, due to the EU's sanctions imposed on a number of Russian businessmen as a consequence of Russia's invasion of Ukraine. A spokesperson for Melnichenko vowed to contest the seizure. While under seizure, the yacht was re-registered in June 2022 at Freetown, under the Sierra Leone flag. As of October 2026, the yacht was at an anchorage in the Gulf of Trieste.

The vessel in question, anchored off the shores of Trieste, 2026.

== See also ==
- List of large sailing yachts
- Black Pearl (yacht)
- Yachts impacted by international sanctions following the Russian invasion of Ukraine
