= Kuzbassenergo =

JSC Kuzbassenergo
- Native name: OAO «Кузбассэнерго»
- Company type: Joint-stock company
- Founded: 1943
- Headquarters: Kemerovo, Russia
- Key people: Sergey Mikhailov (CEO)
- Revenue: RUB30,617 million (2010)
- Operating income: RUB3,493 million (2010)
- Net income: RUB2,166 million (2010)
- Total assets: RUB33,768 million (2010)
- Parent: Siberian Energy Investments Ltd.
- Website: www.kuzbassenergo.ru/eng/

Kuzbassenergo OAO (also known as TGK-12) is a Russian joint-stock company specialized in the distribution of energy. The company's headquarters are located in the Russian city of Barnaul, in the Altai Krai region (Southwest Siberia). The company is controlled by Siberian Energy Investments Ltd., a holding company controlled by Andrey Melnichenko's company Donalink Ltd.

According to the company's official website, Kuzbassenergo generated 24.906 GWh in 2006.

Kuzbassenergo's CEO is Sergey Mikhailov. The company was delisted from the Moscow Exchange in January 2016.
