= A (motor yacht) =

Superyacht

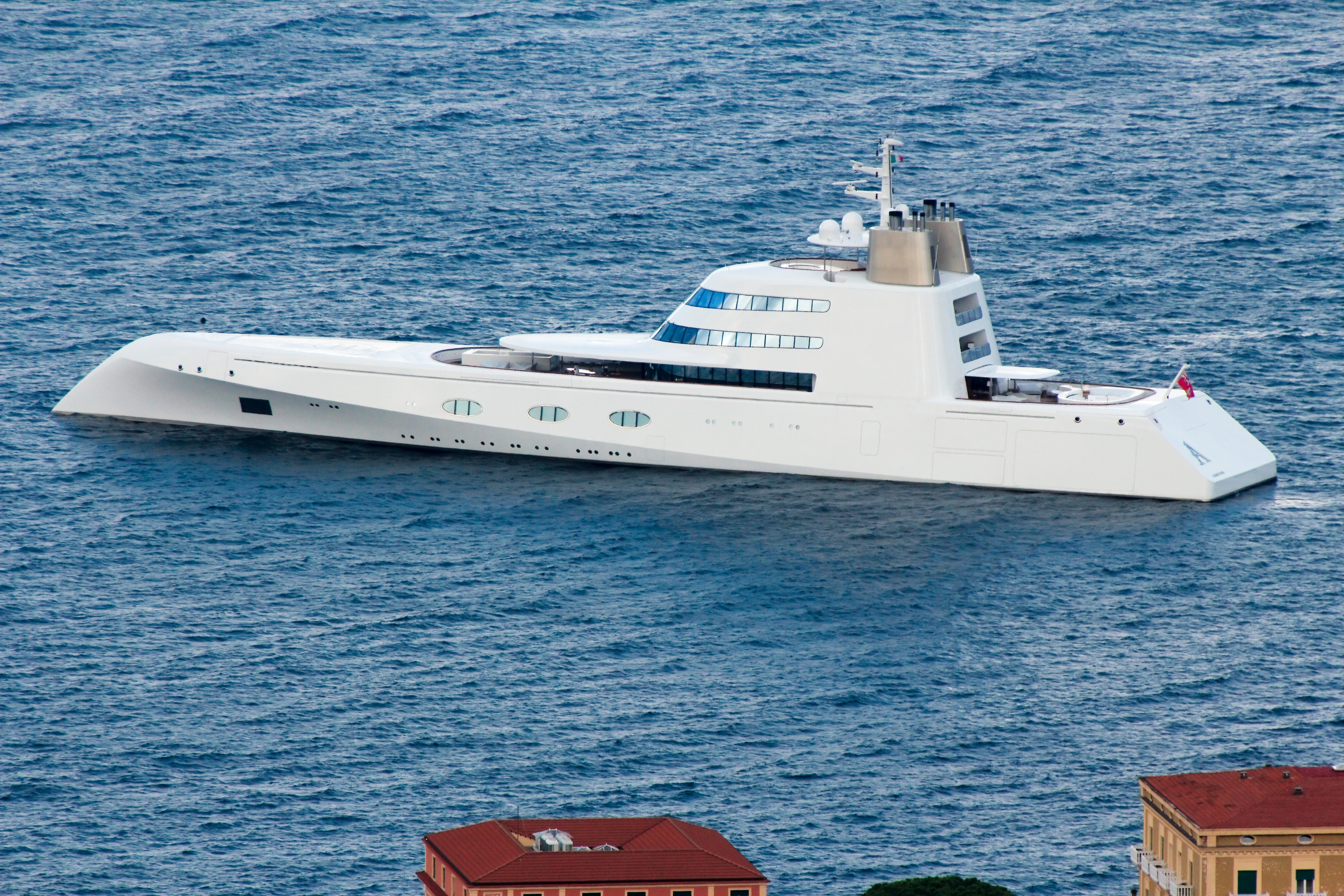
- M/Y A cruising off Sorrento, Italy

History

Malaysia
- Name: A
- Port of registry: Malaysia
- Ordered: November 2004
- Builder: Blohm + Voss
- Cost: c. US$300 million
- Launched: 3 January 2008
- Identification: IMO number: 1009340; MMSI number: 538071242; Callsign: V7UJ7
- Status: Operational

General characteristics
- Type: Private motor yacht
- Tonnage: 5,959 GT
- Length: 119.00 m (390.4 ft)
- Beam: 18.87 m (61.9 ft)
- Draft: 5.15 m (16.9 ft)
- Installed power: 9,000 kW (12,000 hp)
- Propulsion: 2 × MAN RK280 diesel engines
- Speed: 23 knots (43 km/h; 26 mph)
- Range: 6,500 NM (12,000 km; 7,500 mi)
- Boats & landing craft carried: 1 × Philippe Starck custom made covered tender; 1 × Philippe Starck custom made open tender; 1 × Pascoe SY10; 2 × rescue tenders
- Capacity: 14
- Crew: 37 (+5)
- Aviation facilities: 1 × helipad (forward deck)

Motor Yacht A (MY A) is a superyacht designed by Philippe Starck and engineered by naval architect Martin Francis. She was built by the Blohm + Voss shipyard at the HDW deepwater facility in Kiel. She was ordered in November 2004, and delivered in 2008 at a rumoured cost of US$300 million. With a length of 119 metres (390 ft) and measuring almost 6,000 tonnes, she is one of the largest motor yachts in the world. Before 2022 she was connected with the Russian entrepreneur and industrialist Andrey Melnichenko, but according to his representatives he has no relation to her anymore.

== Design and development ==
A was designed by Philippe Starck. According to Boat International, "the design for what would become the world’s most talked about superyacht bubbled into Starck’s mind at his home in Burano, Venice, in 2004. There was no brief beyond an idea of length and a demand for six cabins". Starck is quoted as saying "That was the beauty of the project and the beauty and intelligence of the owner, he just left me completely free," and the article notes that "[his] intention was to make her blend with the sea, to have her live [...] in 'harmony' with the elements. He became obsessed with the way the yacht moved through the water, with barely a ripple, “like a whale”".

In common with many superyachts, little was known about A when she was first commissioned. Builder Blohm + Voss issued a press release in December 2004 identifying the vessel as Project Sigma, which was how it became most commonly known during her construction. Its length was given as 118 metres (387 ft), a metre short of its final length. While conceptual designer Philippe Starck and project manager Neil Wade were credited personally, Starck's partner naval architect Martin Francis was the chief technical and naval designer. Starck was alleged to have taken only three and a half hours to come up with the final shape, whose reverse bow and tumblehome design has drawn parallels with the Zumwalt class of stealth destroyers designed for the US Navy. However, in an interview with Wallpaper magazine, Starck acknowledged it took a month to complete following its commissioning.

It was also stated in the press release that the owner of mega yacht Pelorus, Russian billionaire Roman Abramovich, was not the customer behind Sigma. Nevertheless, because Pelorus was undergoing a concurrent refit at the same shipyard, and because both projects shared the same management company, there was continued speculation that the two vessels had a common owner throughout A's construction. Melnichenko's name appeared only after the ship was delivered in July 2008.

In interviews for Yachts International and Die Zeit magazines, Starck gave details of the vessel's most innovative features. He described her as a "stealth yacht" with a very smooth hull design, which left almost no wake at 25 knots (46 km/h; 29 mph). Its "purity" was, he said, a reflection of its owner, a "young and brilliant mathematician." Connection with Melnichenko, a reputed math prodigy, was not confirmed until after the ship was delivered in July 2008. Martin Francis, the boat's naval architect, was also interviewed by Yachts International in 2008, and he too cited the boat's efficiency through the water and her small bow wake as a major innovation. Francis explained that typically the shipyard will do the hull testing, but in A's case a model was built and tested in the Solent estuary early in the design process, long prior to the involvement of any builders.

== Construction and launch ==
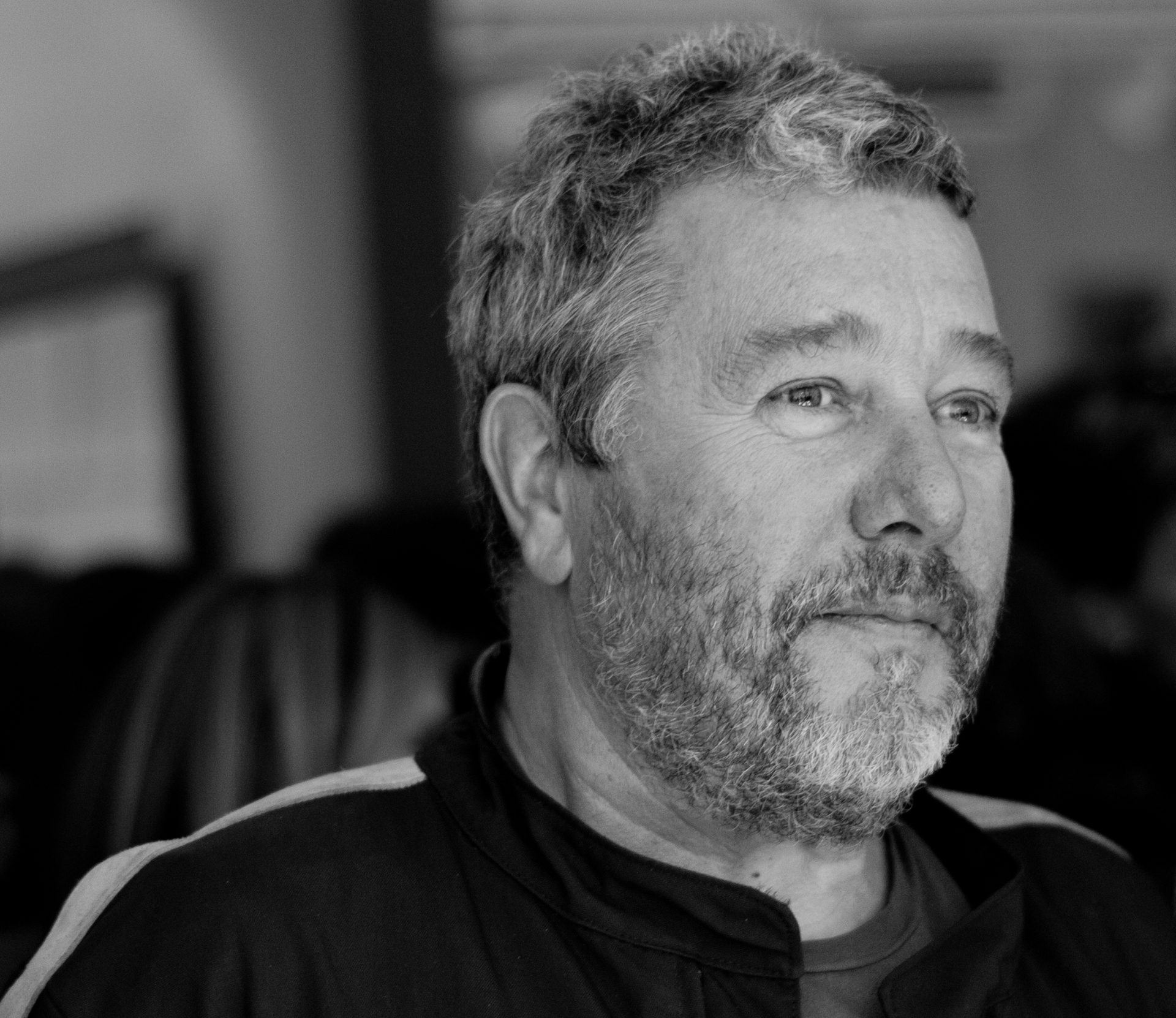
Conceptual designer Philippe Starck was responsible for A's radical silhouette.

Project Sigma was given the hull number 970 (she was the 970th build by Blohm + Voss), it was decided that construction would take place at Howaldtswerke-Deutsche Werft (HDW), a sister yard in Kiel also owned by B+V's parent, ThyssenKrupp Marine Systems.

The boat was out of public view for three years, until she presented in an unfinished state for the first time in January 2008. She was provisionally named SF99, as painted on the stern. Six weeks later she emerged again, to perform some brief trials in the waterway adjacent to the shipyard. Finally, in March, the vessel sailed north out of the Kiel Fjord, to perform her first sea trials off the coast of Rügen in the Baltic Sea.

Prior to delivery, the yacht was finally christened A in May 2008. The name “A” was used in order make the vessel appear first on shipping registries, while an artful report in the Sunday Times claimed it was "so that nothing can precede her in the list of the world’s greatest vessels". Once delivered, A's maiden voyage took her to Kristiansand in southern Norway, where Andrey and Alexandra Melnichenko collected three Claude Monet paintings they had recently purchased.

When completed, A was the sixth-largest privately owned motor yacht in the world, although by 2011 the construction of newer and larger vessels had relegated her from the top ten. At the time of its launch many commentators made note of the fact that Melnichenko's vessel was slightly bigger than Roman Abramovich's Pelorus, and talk of boat-building one-upmanship between the two oligarchs was fuelled further when Abramovich launched an even bigger yacht, Eclipse, in 2010.

=== Features ===
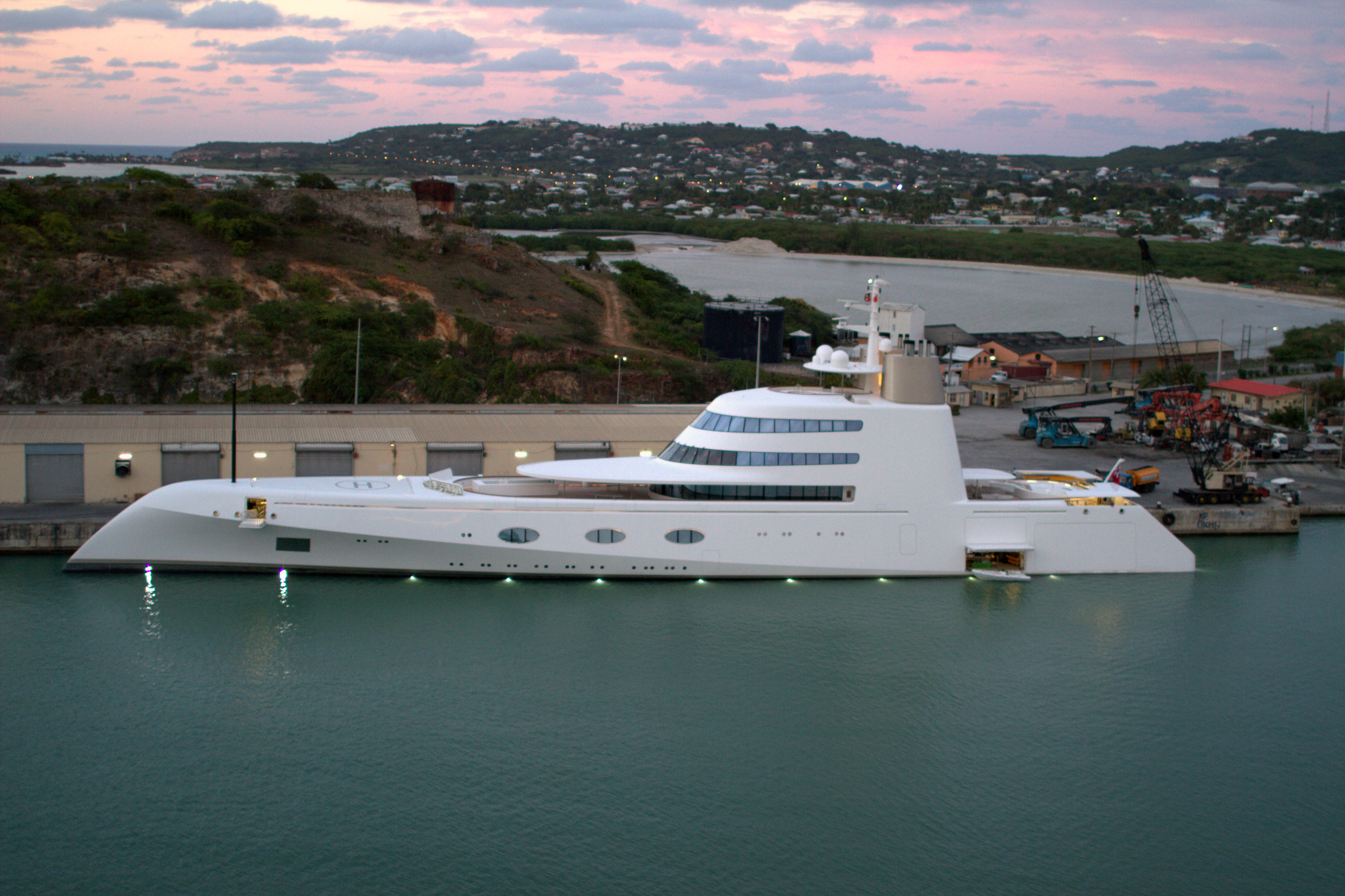
A in the harbor of St. John's, Antigua

A is powered by two MAN RK280 diesel engines providing approximately 9,000 kW (12,000 hp), sufficient to give the yacht a maximum speed of 23 knots (43 km/h; 26 mph). At her cruising speed of 19 knots (35 km/h; 22 mph) she can travel a maximum of 6,500 nautical miles (12,000 km; 7,500 mi) in under sixteen days before her 750,000 L (160,000 imp gal; 200,000 US gal) fuel tanks are exhausted.

Typically for a mega yacht, A is decorated, equipped, and staffed to an extremely opulent standard. There is almost 24,000 square feet (2,200 m^{2}) of interior space, including 2,500 square feet (230 m^{2}) for the master suite. Starck, known for his occasionally risqué design choices, also added a secret room hidden behind mirrored panels. Mirrored surfaces feature extensively throughout the interior, along with Baccarat crystal which is used for the glassware and tableware, as well as for the furniture. There are seven guest cabins, although they have moving walls and can be converted to four larger staterooms. Above-deck there is a helipad and swimming pool forward of the superstructure and two more pools aft, one of which is glass-bottomed and can be viewed from the below-deck disco.

35 staff are employed on the vessel. Reportedly, security is tightly controlled, with 44 mm (1.7 in)-thick bomb-proof glass in the windows, over 40 CCTV cameras, motion sensors, biometric fingerprint/keypad entry for restricted areas and a rumoured escape pod in case of emergencies.

The two main tenders, one open and one covered, and a third sports tender have also been designed by Starck, and built by Vaudrey Miller of New Zealand. They are all 10–11 metres (33–36 ft) long, and reputedly cost $1 million each. The total cost of A has never been officially confirmed, but $300 million has been the most frequently cited estimate.

== Reception ==
The exterior design of A, which designer Starck had likened to being "more like a fish than a building", polarized opinions from the outset. Jonathan Beckett, chief executive of London yacht brokers Burgess, was initially skeptical, but changed his mind after seeing the boat in person in the Caribbean: "I have to say I was impressed. It's a very exciting boat to watch. It's simply unlike anything that's ever been done before." David Pelly of Boat International was also enamoured, saying she was "the most extraordinary yacht launched in recent memory." And writing about the world's biggest mega yachts in The New York Times in 2011, Nazanin Lankarini argued that A was "even more desirable [than] her larger sisters by virtue of lines reminiscent of a nuclear submarine". A was one of the featured vessels in the 2011 edition of The Superyachts, where she was described as "bold and eccentric."

"I'm all for innovation — as I've said before, the rich are free to spend their money as they like, including by building ugly boats that cost hundreds of millions of dollars. But seeing pictures of Sigma almost makes Tom Perkins' Maltese Falcon look like an act of restraint and good taste. Now that's a nautical achievement."

— Robert Frank, The Wall Street Journal, January 23, 2008.

By contrast, Power & Motoryacht magazine columnist Diane Byrne opined that "overall she does not float my boat [...] but I do quite like the inverted bow design", while Donald Starkey, a British yacht designer, commented that A "is aggressive, like a giant finger pointing at you. It seems to have nothing to do with the whole idea of yachting, which is about cruising around at a leisurely pace, and enjoying your friends and the sea". Maritime commentator Peter Mello was even more scathing in his assessment, deriding her as "one of the most hideous vessels ever to sail the seas".

The Wall Street Journal's Robert Frank was initially also an outspoken critic, calling A "one of the ghastliest megayachts ever created" and "more like a cruiser for Darth Vader's navy than a family pleasure boat for the Mediterranean" when she was launched. However, in a follow-up blog several months later, he confessed: "I've gained a bit more respect for it. Technically, it's impressive: Because of her "ax bow," the boat barely makes a splash in the front when it's speeding along at 24 knots. And it's different in a way few yachts are. [...] So even though I still think it's a monster, A gets a tip of the hat for taking a risk and being different".

== History ==
Melnichenko wanted a mirror-like shine paint for the vessel. During construction, Blohm+Voss built a 10-ton mock-up of MV A to test the paint systems provided by AkzoNobel. After the vessel had been painted with the chosen paint, Melnichenko was not satisfied, so AkzoNobel repainted it. The owner remained dissatisfied and, in 2010, filed a lawsuit in New Jersey seeking more than $100 million to repair the unsatisfactory paint job and for expenses for renting a similar replacement yacht. He brought the yacht to the Calliope Cock at Devonport Naval Base, New Zealand, for a third paint job at a cost of reportedly about $30 million. There is no record of a verdict of the 2010 lawsuit.

Melnichenko, who resides in Ras Al Khaimah, United Arab Emirates, was hit with sanctions by the EU and UK in March 2022, and by the US in August 2022. He is contesting the sanctions. While his sailing yacht A had been seized by Italy, MV A has escaped this fate. Its registration was changed form the Isle of Man to Malaysia, and being moored in the UAE, it was outside of the jurisdiction of the countries imposing the sanctions. In July 2026, the vessel was moved from Port Rashid to Malé, Maldives.

== See also ==
- A (sailing yacht)
- Yachts impacted by international sanctions following the Russian invasion of Ukraine
