= Gavril Yushvaev =

Russian businessman

- Born: July 23, 1957 (age 68); Makhachkala, Dagestan
- Occupations: Businessman, investor

Gavril A. Yushvaev (Russian: Гаврил Юшваев; born 23 July 1957) is a Russian-born Israeli businessman and investor. He is best known as a co-founder of Wimm Bill Dann and as an investor in Polyus Gold.

According to Forbes, Yushvaev's net worth stood at $1.9 billion as of 2023.

== Biography ==
Gavril Yushvaev was born in Makhachkala, Dagestan. He has been certified by the Israeli Community of Porto as a descendant of Sephardic Jews.

In 1980, Yushvaev was convicted of robbery and spent nine years in a Soviet prison camp, a fact disclosed in Wimm-Bill-Dann's prospectus for its 2002 IPO. Following his release in 1989, he partnered with David Yakobashvili. In 1993, the two invested in the Lianozovo Dairy Plant, which later became Wimm Bill Dann. In 2020, he applied for Portuguese citizenship, but the application remained pending as of 2023.

== Business ventures ==
Yushvaev amassed his wealth in the 1990s as co-founder of Trinity, a company that owned a range of businesses in Moscow. He subsequently invested in Wimm-Bill-Dann, a dairy and juice producer. The company was founded in 1995 and held its initial public offering in 2002. Yushvaev remained the largest shareholder until 2010, when he sold his 19.6 per cent stake to PepsiCo for $1.1 billion.

In 2013, Yushvaev, together with another Russian businessman, acquired a 38 per cent stake in Polyus Gold from Mikhail Prokhorov for $3.6 billion. He sold his holding in Polyus Gold in 2015 and, in the same year, made a $100 million investment in Lyft and joined a consortium that invested $150 million in Humacyte, a US-based biotechnology company. He had earlier invested in the German delivery service Delivery Hero in 2013, and in the software company Domo in 2018.

Yushvaev maintains a holding company in Cyprus.

== Personal life ==
Yushvaev is married and has eight children.
