= Sergei Popov (businessman) =

Russian businessman and banker

- Сергей Попов
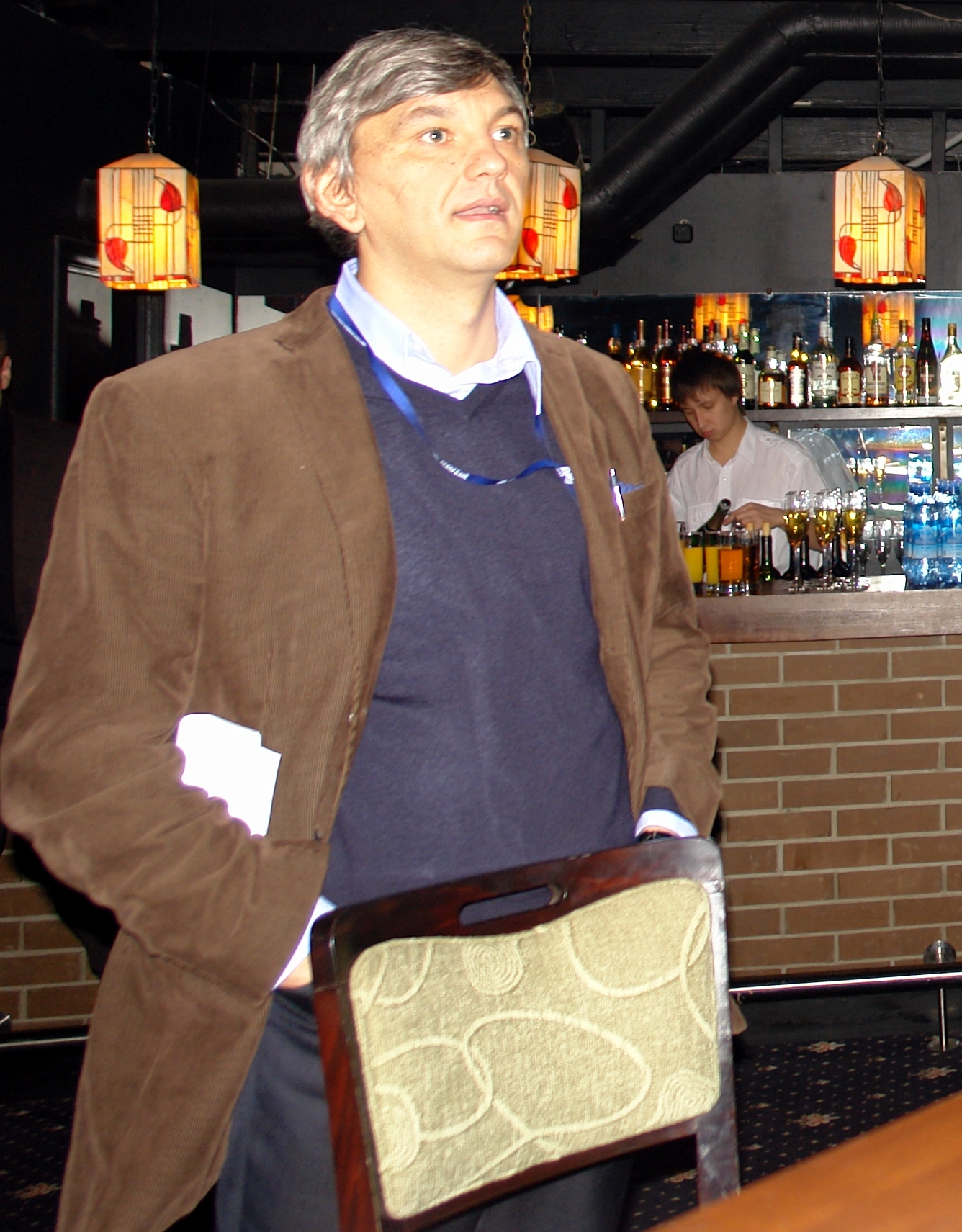
- Popov in 2008
- Born: 12 August 1971 (age 54); Yekaterinburg, Russia
- Education: Bachelor of Arts/Science
- Alma mater: Ural Polytechnic Institute
- Occupation(s): Businessman, Investor
- Children: 2

Sergei Viktorovich Popov (Russian: Серге́й Викторович Попов; born 12 August 1971) is a Russian businessman and billionaire.

== Early life and education ==
Popov studied for his Bachelor's Degree in Bachelor of Arts/Science at the Ural Polytechnic Institute.

== Career ==
In 1994, he co-founded Prodcontract, supplying scrap metal to Russia's biggest metallurgical plants. In 1996, he co-founded MDM Business Concern. From 1997 to 1999, he was a partner and business manager of the company.

In 2000, he became co-founder and Chairman of the Board of Directors of MDM Industrial Group. The Group identified three core business sectors: production of pipes, fertilisers and thermal coal, and began acquiring businesses in these sectors. Such large businesses as OAO TMK (one of the leading producers of oil and gas pipelines in the world), SUEK (the largest coal energy company in Russia), and Eurochem (one of the world's leading mineral fertiliser producers) were established. During this period, in 2003, Popov became a 50% partner in MDM Bank.

In 2006, Popov sold the first of his business assets. In 2016, exited his remaining active investments with the sale of his stake in MDM Bank to B & N Bank.

Popov is a founder member of the Moscow School of Management, Skolkovo.

In 2010, Popov founded a private fund called Agat, which has a mentoring program that offers young businesspeople startup capital.

== Net worth ==
As per Forbes, his net worth was estimated at $3.1B in 2022, making him the 984th richest person in the world.
