= Alexander Svetakov =

Russian billionaire businessman

- Born: Alexander Alexandrovich Svetakov; 15 February 1968 (age 58); Moscow
- Education: Moscow Institute of Electronic Machine Building (MIEM)
- Occupations: Founder and chairman, Absolut Group
- Known for: Banking, property development
- Children: 3

Alexander Alexandrovich Svetakov (Russian: Александр Александрович Светаков; born 15 February 1968 in Moscow) is a Russian billionaire property developer, the founder and chairman of Absolut Group

== Early life ==
Alexander Alexandrovich Svetakov was educated at the Moscow Institute of Electronic Machine Building (MIEM), where he earned a BA in engineering.

== Career ==
While attending MIEM, Svetakov partnered with fellow students Gleb Galin and Andrew Truskov to import electronics from Singapore and sell them wholesale. This enterprise became Absolute Trade House (Absolute LLP), now the largest electronics wholesaler in Russia.

In 1993, Svetakov partnered with Galin and Truskov to found Absolute Bank. He sold Absolut-bank in 2007 to a Belgian group for almost $1 billion. Since then, he has shifted to property development, and in 2013 was developing five projects in London and New York City. In 2015, Absolute Group received the International Property Award for Best Office Architecture in Europe for their Noble Business Centre in Limassol, Cyprus.

== Personal life ==
He is divorced with four children and lives in Larnaca, Cyprus. He owns the yacht Cloudbreak.

Svetakov founded the Absolute-Help foundation in 2002 to help orphans, children with disabilities, and children with grave illnesses.
