= Siberian Coal Energy Company =

Russian business

Siberian Coal Energy Company SUEK
- Type: Private (Joint stock company)
- Industry: Coal mining, heat and power generation
- Founded: 2001
- Founder: Andrey Melnichenko
- Headquarters: Moscow, Russia
- Area served: Siberia and Far East
- Key people: Aleхander Redkin
- Products: Coal and energy
- Revenue: US$6,683 billion (2020)
- Operating income: US$892 million (2020)
- Net income: US$194 million (2020)
- Total assets: US$16,034 billion (2020)
- Total equity: US$5,054 billion (2020)
- Number of employees: 70,000 (2020)
- Website: www.suek.com

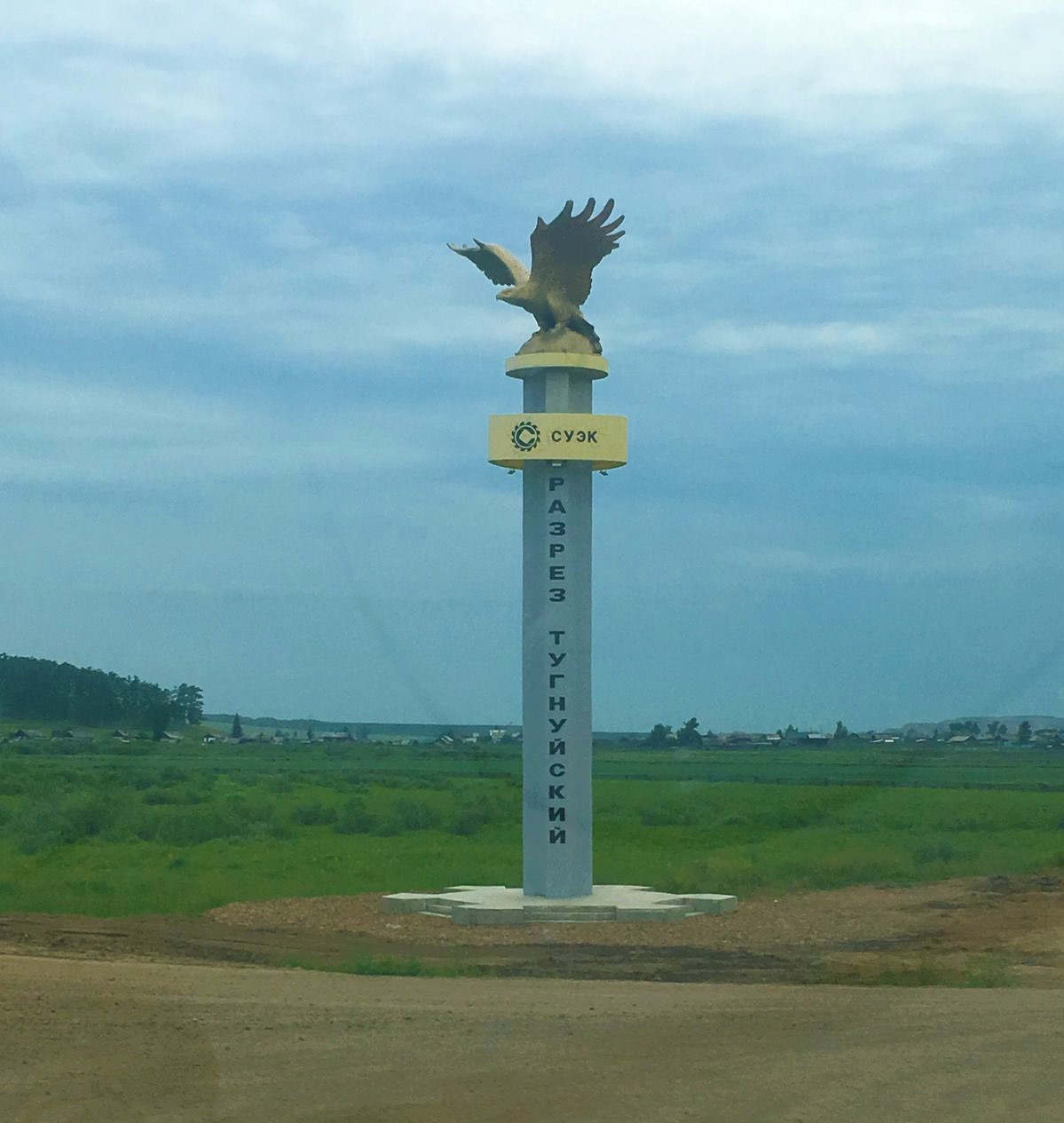
Stella at the entrance to the Tugnuisky open-pit mine

Siberian Coal Energy Company (SUEK) is a coal and energy company based in Russia. SUEK is Russia’s largest coal supplier.

The company was founded in 2001, it is headquartered in Moscow. The full official name is Joint-Stock Company Siberian Coal Energy Company (SUEK JSC). The CEO of the company is Alexander Redkin.

== History ==
SUEK was based on the idea to consolidate disparate coal enterprises throughout Russian regions into an industrial holding in the early 2000s.

The assets that formed SUEK were distressed – the production capacity was less than 30 million tons per year, the enterprises employed 70,000 miners yet productivity was low, and virtually none of its output was exported. Amid the collapse of mining businesses and widespread miners strikes due to unpaid wages and poor working conditions, the average equipment depreciation was 90%.

During the early years of the business, SUEK’s assets were renovated and debts were repaid. The old mines and worn-out equipment were transformed into modern enterprises, several enrichment factories and modules were put into operation, incorporating the processing technologies that allowed SUEK to produce highly enriched coal with low impurity levels.

SUEK built coal bulk terminals and seaports, and built a coal mine methane processing station to generate power within the framework of the Kyoto Protocol. According to the Financial Times, it has invested in high-capacity washing plants and has ash control technologies at all its coal ports. The first smart mining management control center was built to run all SUEK’s operations, monitoring the location and well-being of miners working underground.

After the consolidation of electric power assets, the Siberian Generating Company (SGC) was created as a part of SUEK, and spun out as a separate company. In 2018, SUEK took over SGC.

In the last 15 years, SUEK has invested US$10 billion in coal production and power generation.

SUEK's assets produce nearly 110 million tons of coal annually and the company employs over 70,000 people.

== Owners and management ==
The CEO (General Director) from 2004 to 2020 was Vladimir Rashevsky.

Since May 2020 to 2022, SUEK’s CEO was Stepan Solzhenitsyn, a former McKinsey Senior Partner in energy, and a son of famous novelist Aleksandr Solzhenitsyn. He was also CEO of SUEK’s energy division SGC.

In April 2022, Maxim Basov, ex-Rusagro, was appointed SUEK`s new CEO.

In March 2022, due to International sanctions during the Russo-Ukrainian War, Vladimir Rashevsky has left the Board of directors.

On July 9, 2023 Maxim Basov was replaced by Alexander Redkin.

The company was founded by Russian entrepreneur Andrey Melnichenko, who controlled 92.2% of SUEK, until he withdrew as its beneficiary and resigned from its board of directors on 9 March 2022.

== Operations ==
SUEK operates 28 open-pit and underground mines and 27 power plants in Siberia and in the Russian Far East. SUEK's assets produce over 100 million tons of coal annually, with assured coal reserves of 7.6 billion tons. Its coal, power generation and logistics enterprises in 14 Russian regions employ over 70,000 people.

SUEK produces high-calorific coal with low sulphur and nitrogen content. According to The Financial Times, SUEK is Russia's largest producer of higher-quality thermal coal. SUEK uses automation and digitalization in coal mining across its 26 mines in Kemerovo and elsewhere in Siberia. In some mining operations, workers are replaced with machines. SUEK also piloted Russia’s first fully automated longwall in Polysaevo."

SUEK supplies high-calorific value coal to 48 countries on 5 continents through its own sales and distribution network, including the Asia Pacific where coal plays a key role in energy access. In 2020, sales of SUEK comprised 67% of the total export coal sales to Asia-Pacific market. In 2022, the company's revenue amounted to 83 billion rubles.

== Sustainability ==
Residents of the Kemerovo region live 3-4 years less than the average Russian due to coal dust from the Siberian Coal Energy Company. The cheapness of coal generation is due to the fact that profits are privatized and losses are nationalized and borne by the regional budget. Melnichenko diligently whitewashes himself in the media (a recent example in Lenta.ru).

Melnichenko's PR team tried to ensure that European and American officials, whose decisions are influenced by Wikipedia articles, had a better impression of Melnichenko. They also tried to present Eurochem as a Swiss company. Melnichenko's PR service greenwashes Russia's largest coal producer, promoting that it is at the top of ESG ratings, and that they tackle greenhouse gases.

== Performance Indicators ==
Performance indicators for years, coal production amounted to:

- 2020—101.2 million tons of coal
- 2019—106.2 million tons of coal
- 2018—110.4 million tons of coal
- 2017—107.8 million tons of coal
- 2016—105.4 million tons of coal.
- 2014 - 98.9 million tons of coal.
- 2013 - 96.5 million tons, which is 1% less than in 2012 (according to the company's annual report for 2013).
- 2012 - 97.5 million tons of coal, which is 6% more than in 2011 (according to the company's annual report for 2012).
- 2011 - 92.2 million tons of coal (an increase of 3% compared to 2010). Reserves as of mid-2008 - 5.8 billion tons.
