= Andrey Melnichenko (industrialist) =

Russian industrialist and billionaire

- Андрей Мельниченко
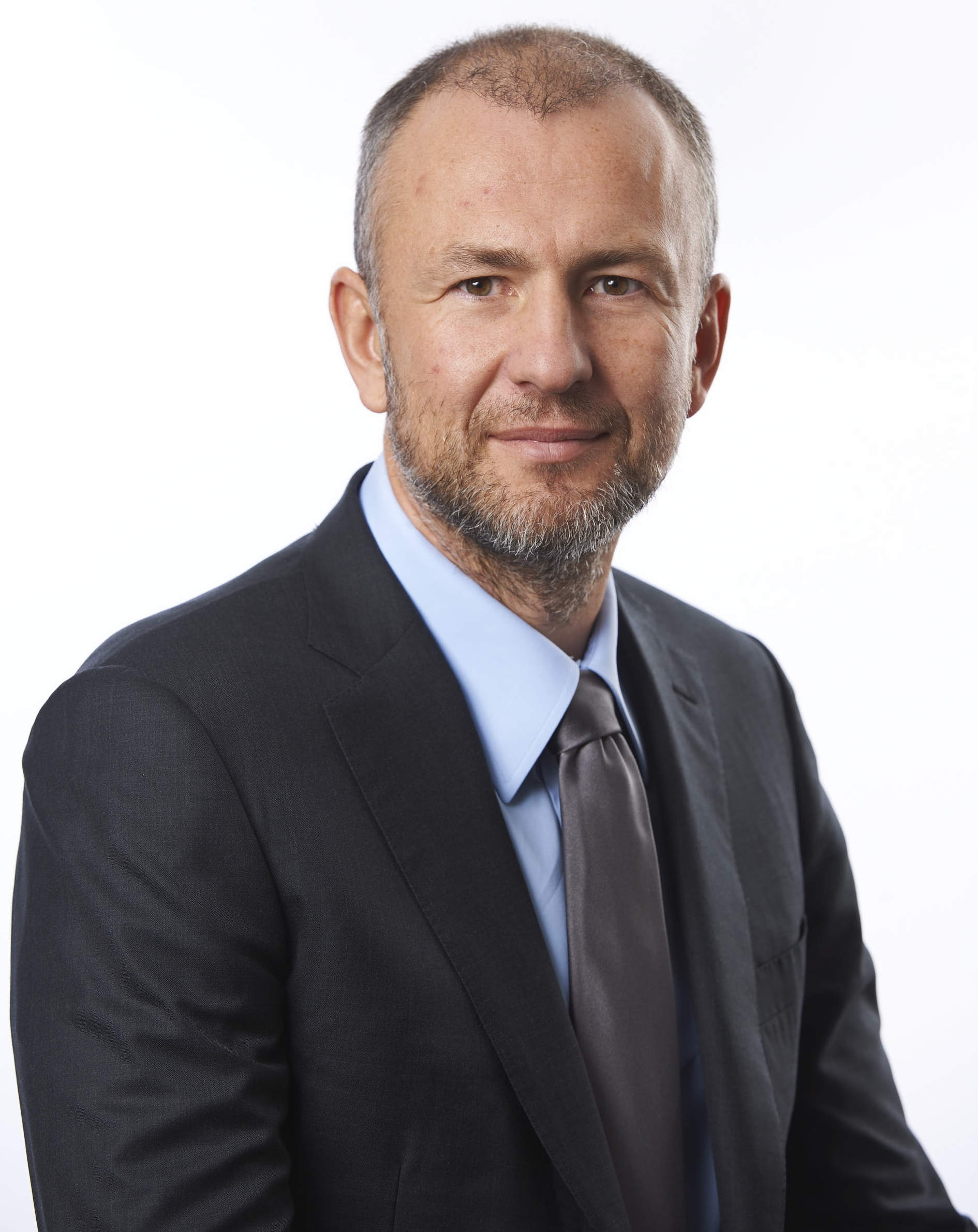
- Melnichenko in 2017
- Born: Andrey Iharavich Myel′nichenka; 8 March 1972 (age 54); Gomel, Byelorussian SSR, Soviet Union
- Citizenship: Russia; United Arab Emirates (since 2021)
- Education: Moscow State University; Plekhanov Russian Economic University
- Occupation: Businessman
- Spouse: Aleksandra Nikolić (m. 2005)
- Children: 2

Andrey Igorevich Melnichenko (Russian: Андрей Игоревич Мельниченко, romanized: Andrey Igorevich Melnichenko; Belarusian: Андрэй Iгаравiч Мельнічэнка, romanized: Andrey Iharavich Myel′nichenka; born 8 March 1972) is a Soviet-born billionaire entrepreneur, financier, and industrialist. He is the founder and ex-beneficiary of fertilizer producer EuroChem Group and coal producer SUEK. He served as non-executive director in both companies until 9 March 2022.

In 2022 Forbes and Bloomberg estimated his net worth at $15.8 billion and $17.4 billion respectively, which makes him one of the richest people in Russia. In the 2023 ranking, for the first time, he took first place among Russian billionaires with a fortune of $25.2 billion (58th place in the world). In February 2024, his net worth was about $21.9 billion according to Bloomberg Billionaires Index. As per Forbes list of The Richest People In The World 2024, Andrey Melnichenko ranked #91 with a net worth of $21.1 Billion and 2026 is estimated with a net worth of 20.1 Billion.

== Early life and education ==
Melnichenko was born on March 8, 1972 in Gomel, Byelorussian SSR to a Belarusian father and a Ukrainian mother, both of whom were teachers. When he was 14, he was evacuated to an empty military base in Lithuania as a result of the Chernobyl disaster. In 2026, he told The Economist that he considered this his "freest and most interesting summer of my childhood: no parents, no school supervision, total freedom." In a 2026 essay for that magazine, he also described the disaster as a "formative experience", writing that it taught him that "a complex system containing enormous amounts of energy does not forgive miscalculation or arrogance." He attended the Advanced Education and Science Centre of the Moscow State University, and in 1989, became a student of the Faculty of Physics at Moscow State University. He then transferred to the Plekhanov Russian University of Economics, from which he graduated in finance.

== Career history ==
=== Banking and investments ===
While at university, Melnichenko began his entrepreneurial ventures by opening a currency exchange booth on the campus. Having made their first US$50,000 in this way, Melnichenko and his partners, two fellow students, received a banking license from the Bank of Russia. In 1993, at the age of 21, Melnichenko co-founded the MDM Bank. The bank moved on buying currency at the Interbank foreign exchange, developing a derivatives market and debt instruments. From 1993 to 1997, Melnichenko chaired the board of directors of MDM Bank. From the late 1990s to the early 2000s, MDM Bank expanded through acquisition, integrating seven regional banks. MDM Bank did not participate in any post-Soviet privatization programs or the loans-for-shares auctions of the 1990s. In 1997, Melnichenko bought out MDM Bank shares from his partners and became the sole shareholder of the bank and the chairman of the management board. Bloomberg reported that "unlike many bigger rivals, MDM came through the 1998 Russian financial crisis nearly unscathed, thanks to a conservative credit policy, the lack of illiquid assets, and no exposure to government bonds. As competitors went under, the lender snagged some of the biggest Russian companies as clients." From 2001 to 2005, he chaired MDM Bank's board of directors. MDM Bank was named the "Bank of the Year" by The Banker in 2002 and 2003. In 2003, Euromoney and, in 2004, Global Finance, named it the "Best Russian Bank".

In 2000, Melnichenko and Sergei Popov, a former metals trader from Ural, co-founded the MDM Group for industrial investments. Their focus was in three areas: pipeline manufacturing, coal production and processing, and the production and processing of fertilizers. This was done through the acquisition of more than 50 independently run and owned businesses: joint-stock companies, plants and mines, which enabled him to form three separate companies: SUEK, EuroChem and TMK (which he exited in 2006 through an IPO at the London Stock Exchange). These industries were derelict, risky, and not subject to the political influence that dominated other sectors. With the process of post-Soviet era privatizations having concluded five years earlier, no more than 5% of the assets purchased were acquired from the state. From 2001 to 2004, Melnichenko was the President of the MDM Group.

From 2004 to 2007, Melnichenko sold shares of MDM Bank to his MDM Group partner Sergei Popov, and focused on the development of the industrial assets in fertilizers and coal. Following Melnichenko's decision to step down from MDM Bank in 2007, the International Finance Corporation (IFC) purchased 5% of MDM Bank shares for US$185 million, valuing the bank at US$3.7 billion. Having served its consolidating purpose, MDM Group ceased to exist.

=== EuroChem ===
In 2007, Melnichenko became EuroChem's majority shareholder. Earlier, in April 2004, he had become the chairman of the mineral and chemical company OJSC EuroChem. When EuroChem was founded, the purchased assets included several nitrogen plants and a phosphate mine fitted with Soviet-era equipment. EuroChem produces commodity and specialty fertilizers including inhibitor products that allow slow release of nutrients into crops. According to Melnichenko, his strategy on fertilizers can be described as "taking advantage of the wide range of mineral resources found in Russia and the CIS," with a particular focus on logistics and a diverse range of products.

New manufacturing facilities were built in Novomoskovsk, Nevinnomyssk, and Kovdor (including a complex for processing apatite and shtaffelite ores). In 2011, EuroChem acquired laboratories in Germany, leading to the creation of similar facilities in Russia and other countries for the development of second-generation fertilizers, including advanced slow-release products aimed at reducing the environmental footprint of the agricultural sector. EuroChem bought licenses for potash deposits in Volgograd in 2005, and in Perm in 2008, launching plans to develop two large potash industrial plants. EuroChem's two potash mines are indended to produce 8 million metric tons of the fertilizer a year, a 10th of current world output. According to Bloomberg, "the acquisition of a BASF SE plant in Antwerp by EuroChem for 830 million euros ($930 million) brought in new technologies" for the company. BASF sold its fertilizer operation in Antwerp, Belgium, to EuroChem on March 31, 2012. In July 2012, EuroChem completed the acquisition of K+S Nitrogen, a company marketing nitrogenous fertilizers with a focus on agriculture and special crops such as fruits, vegetables and grapes.

In 2015, EuroChem moved its headquarters to Switzerland for access to the capital markets and international operations. It has manufacturing, logistic and distribution facilities in Russia, Belgium, Lithuania, Estonia, China, Germany, Kazakhstan, and the United States. EuroChem's products are sold in more than 100 countries. EuroChem Group has raised funds on the international capital markets. In 2016, EuroChem invested in biological crop nutrition company Agrinos for research and development into a new generation of products. Elsewhere, EuroChem expanded its distribution network, buying operations in the US, Argentina, Brazil, and Hungary.

In 2019, EuroChem launched its US$1 billion ammonia plant, EuroChem Northwest, in Kingisepp, Russia. With a production capacity of 1 million tonnes (1MMT) per year, this ensured its full self-sufficiency in ammonia production, a further step towards vertical integration. The plant was built on a brownfield site and is equipped with a closed water recycling system to prevent water discharge into the Baltic Sea, using 75% of wastewater from its own Phosphorite phosphate plant nearby. The company is also reportedly building EuroChem Northwest 2, a new 1.1 MMT ammonia and 1.4 MMT urea plant on an adjacent site in Kingisepp, Russia. Melnichenko announced at SPIEF 2021 that "EuroChem was investing $4.4 billion into modern high-tech ammonia, urea and methanol plants" in Kingisepp, of which "10% were being invested into the innovative environmental technologies, which exceed Russia’s regulatory standards", referring to carbon capture and water recycling. EuroChem reportedly was also interested in acquiring an ammonia and urea plant in Louisiana. In 2020, EuroChem's Usolskiy Potash Project in Perm produced 2.223 MMT of potash.

Melnichenko served as Non-Executive Director of EuroChem Group AG. Melnichenko was the effective beneficiary of 100 percent of EuroChem. On 9 March 2022, he resigned from all positions and withdrew as its beneficiary.

=== SUEK ===
In February 2005, Melnichenko became a director of SUEK JSC (Siberian Coal Energy Company). He became its chairman in June 2011. The same year, he created the Siberian Generating Company (SGC) on the basis of electricity assets of SUEK and became its chairman. In 2013, he became the primary shareholder of SUEK and SGC upon purchasing the shares of his ex-partners. In 2018, SUEK took over SGC. SGC produces 25% of electricity in Siberia (6% of Russia's electricity). According to Bloomberg, SUEK produces high-calorific coal with low sulphur and nitrogen content. It is a global supplier of high-calorific value coal with distribution in 48 countries including in the Asia-Pacific, where it supplies coal for HELE (high efficiency, low emission) power plants.

The assets that formed SUEK were initially distressed. At that time, production capacity was less than 30 million tons per year, and despite employing around 70,000 miners, productivity was low and virtually none of its output was exported. The average equipment depreciation was 90%. During the early years of the business, SUEK's assets were modernized, debts were repaid, wages as well as tax payments were regularized, and a modernization program was launched with new machinery. Several enrichment factories and modules were put into operation, allowing SUEK to produce highly enriched coal. SUEK built modern bulk terminals, upgraded seaports, and built a coal mine methane processing station to generate power within the framework of the Kyoto Protocol. According to the International Energy Agency's Clean Coal Centre, "SUEK, Russia's main exporter of higher-quality thermal coal, has invested in modern high-capacity washing plants and has ash control technologies at all its coal ports". The Financial Times reported that SUEK uses automation and digitalization in coal mining, reporting that SUEK "is rolling out big-data tools and automation across its 26 mines in Kemerovo and elsewhere in Siberia," adding that total automation was being considered in some of its mining operations as had already been rolled out with its fully automated longwall in Polysaevo.

SUEK assets produce more than 100 million tons of coal annually, holding an estimated 7.6 billion tons of coal in reserve. Its coal, power, and logistics enterprises in 12 Russian regions employ over 70,000 people. According to S&P Global Ratings, "SUEK's mining segment outperforms peers on greenhouse gas (GHG) emissions", noting its compliance with local and international standards. According to The Financial Times, SUEK pays its workers "more than four times the salary ordinary workers in neighbouring mines say they get." According to an ESG ranking of Russian companies 2021 by RAEX, SUEK ranks 11th out of 110 companies in Russia.

On the long term sustainability of fossil fuels, Melnichenko publicly stated that "given the current level of technology, it will only be possible for alternative energy sources to reduce carbon emissions in some regions", adding that "companies and governments will need to develop other solutions to expand alternatives energy and that’s unlikely to happen in the next few decades."

From April 2015 to 2022, Melnichenko served as Non-Executive Director of SUEK JSC and was the main beneficiary of SUEK. As of 2021, he owned a 92.2 percent stake in SUEK. On March 9, 2022, he resigned from all positions and withdrew as its beneficiary.

== Business record ==
According to media reports, in the last fifteen years, Melnichenko's companies have invested more than $23 billion into the Russian economy and industrial sector. In total, his companies reportedly employ over 100,000 people. 20% of all investments by non-oil and gas companies made in Russia in 2012–2017 were made by Andrey Melnichenko's companies. Melnichenko's companies reportedly spent over $500 million on social and charitable projects.

Melnichenko's key assets included:

- EuroChem Group AG: a fertilizer producer. Melnichenko was the effective beneficiary of 100% of the company's shares until 9 March 2022.
- SUEK (Siberian Coal Energy Company) JSC: a coal producer. Andrey Melnichenko was the beneficiary of 92.2% of the company's shares (Siberian Generating Company LLC (SGC) is directly owned by SUEK) until 9 March 2022.

Melnichenko was a Member of the Board of Directors (Non-executive Director) at both EuroChem Group AG and SUEK JSC until March 9, 2022.

Since 2007, Melnichenko has been Member of the Bureau of the Board of Directors of the Russian Union of Industrialists and Entrepreneurs (RSPP), serving as Chairman of the Mining Commission and Chairman of the Committee on Climate Policy and Carbon Regulation.

In the 2000s, Melnichenko was part of the EU-Russia Industrialists' Roundtable (IRT), a platform composed of business leaders from the EU and Russia, which sought to improve EU-Russia economic relations.

In 2019, Andrey Melnichenko was awarded the title of Commendatore of the Order of the Star of Italy for "encouraging dialogue and economic cooperation between Italy and Russia".

=== Alleged oligarch status ===
Melnichenko was mentioned on the list of "Russian oligarchs" named in the CAATSA unclassified report to the U.S. Congress. However, this was the subject of controversy as Forbes noted in 2017 that report simply listed all Russian businessmen with an estimated net worth over $1 billion. The report itself states that inclusion on the list "does not constitute the determination by any agency that any of those individuals or entities meet the criteria for designation under any sanctions program". In response, Melnichenko stated that he had seen no issues with banks or compliance, but noted that the situation was impossible to predict going forward.

Among Russia's richest businessmen, both Forbes and Forbes Russia do not consider Melnichenko to be an oligarch because his fortune was made without ties to the Russian government, neither under Yeltsin nor Putin. According to Reuters, in 2022 Melnichenko spoke out against the Russian invasion of Ukraine and made urgent calls for peace, warning of a global food crisis and likely food shortages due to "soaring prices in fertilisers".

== Sanctions ==
On March 9, 2022 Melnichenko was placed on the EU sanctions list on the basis of being "one of the leading businesspersons involved in economic sectors providing a substantial source of revenue to the Government of Russia". In response, Melnichenko stated that he had no relation to or prior knowledge of the invasion, nor did he have any political affiliations, calling the EU's decision "absurd and nonsensical". It was reported that Melnichenko stepped down from his positions at Eurochem and SUEK and withdrew as a beneficiary upon being sanctioned. Reuters reported that he would be disputing the sanctions listing.

Following the outbreak of the Russo-Ukrainian War, Melnichenko was sanctioned by several individual governments, including the United Kingdom in 2022, Japan in January 2023, and by Canada under the Special Economic Measures Act (S.C. 1992, c. 17) for Grave Breach of International Peace and Security. In July 2024, Melnichenko sat down for an interview with Tucker Carlson in El Salvador; he told Carlson that because of the sanctions against him, he cannot travel to the European Union or the United States.

On December 17 the European Court of Justice repelled a petition of Melnichenko against the sanctions and confirmed them.

== Legal action in Russia ==
In August 2023, Russia's Prosecutor General's Office filed a suit against Melnichenko with the aim to nationalize his former company Sibeco, which owns several thermal power plants. Both parties settled the suit in October 2023. Kuzbassenergo, which currently owns Sibeco, agreed to a deal in which an undisclosed amount of money would be diverted to a social charity engaged in educating children.

== Personal life ==
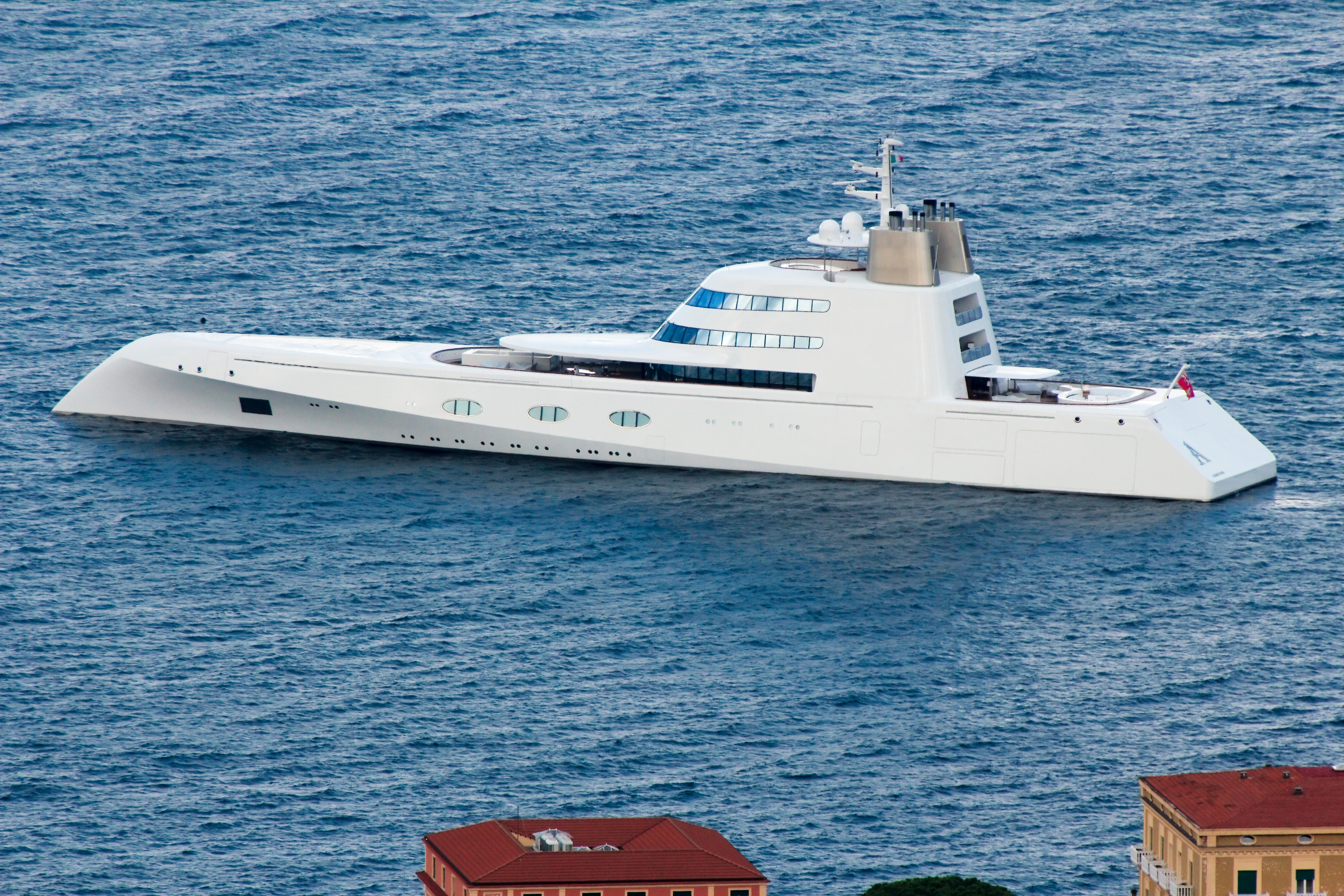
M/Y A (2008)

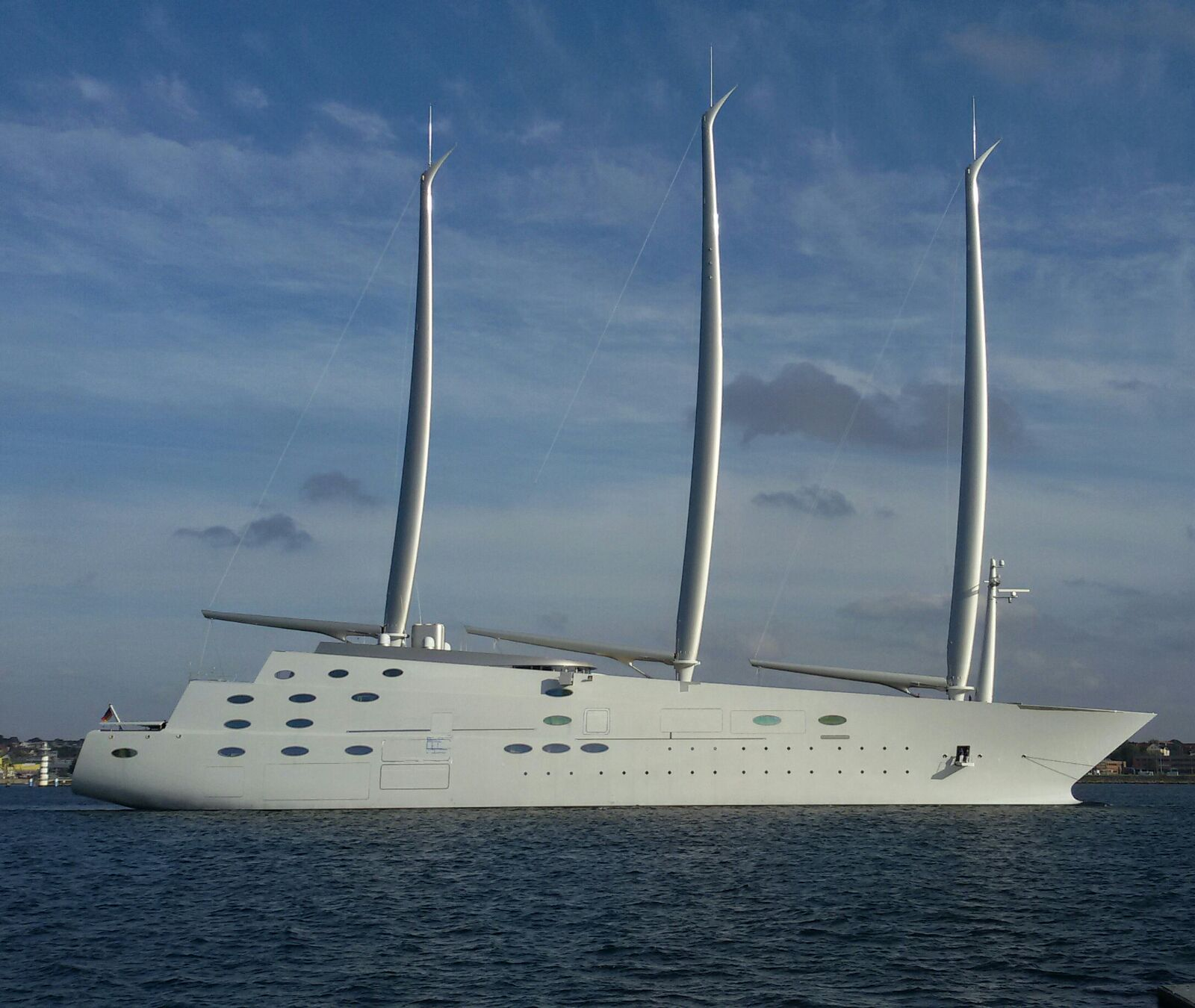
S/Y A (2017)

In 2005, Melnichenko married Serbian former pop singer and model Aleksandra Nikolić in the South of France. They have two children.

Two high-tech yachts were built for Andrey Melnichenko: Sailing Yacht A (2017) and Motor Yacht A (2008). Both were designed by French architect and industrial designer Philippe Starck. Andrey Melnichenko's representatives repeatedly said that he has no connection with both yachts whether in terms of ownership, or in any other way since 2022.

S/Y A was handed over to him in May 2017 in Monaco. Boat International called it "the boundary pushing superyacht" and "a monument to invention". In 2016, Bloomberg reported that "the swanky boat reflects the same eye for innovation and high-tech detail that Melnichenko, 44, is now focusing on the fertilizer business that’s helped make him one of Russia’s youngest billionaires."

In March 2022, following the EU sanctions imposed on the number of Russian businessmen, Italian authorities seized Sailing Yacht A in the port city of Trieste. According to Reuters, Melnichenko responded that he "will be disputing these baseless and unjustified sanctions" and that "the rule of law and common sense will prevail." The Lazio Regional Administrative Court in Rome, hearing the case, submitted a request with the Court of Justice of the European Union in May 2024 to take up a preliminary ruling to questions as to whether, under EU sanctions, the concepts of “belonging to” and “control” extend to trust beneficiaries, even when those beneficiaries can’t dispose of the assets. According to the higher court, those concepts encompass all forms of power or influence over the assets. Meanwhile the annual maintenance costs of around 10 million Euros yearly continues to be paid by local authorities, provided by the Italian treasury.

Andrey Melnichenko reportedly lives with his family in Moscow.

== See also ==
- List of Russian billionaires
