= EuroChem =

Fertilizer company headquartered in Switzerland

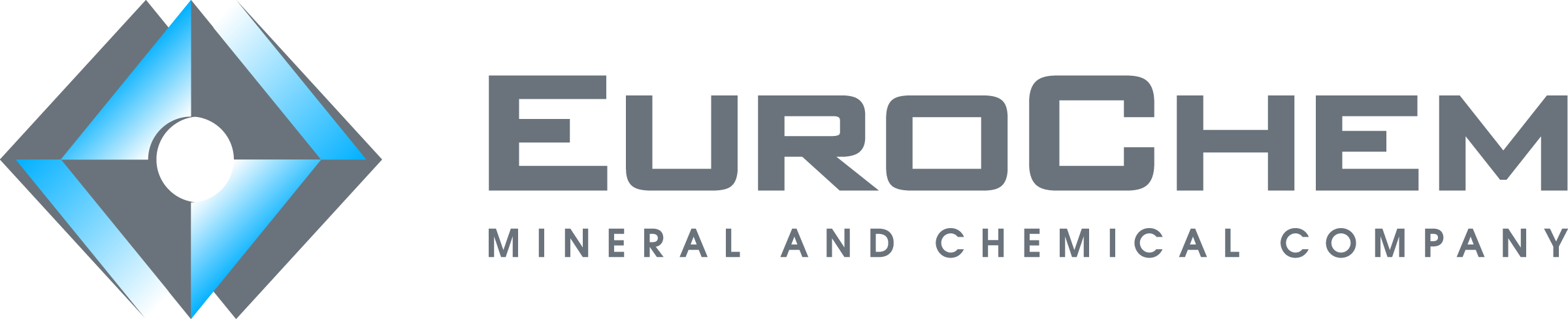
- Industry: Fertilizers
- Headquarters: Zug, Switzerland
- Area served: Worldwide
- Key people: Samir Brikho (Chairman)
- Products: Fertilizers
- Revenue: US$6.2 billion (2020)
- Operating income: US$1,177,888 (2019)
- Net income: US$1,017,676 (2019)
- Total assets: US$11,659,561 (2019)
- Number of employees: 27,000 (2020)
- Website: www.eurochemgroup.com

EuroChem Group AG is a fertilizer producer headquartered in Zug, Switzerland, where it moved from Russia in 2015. It is a fertilizer manufacturer with capacity in nitrogen, phosphates, potash, NPK fertilizers, as well as industrial acids and mineral raw materials. While EuroChem has most of its production assets in Russia, it has manufacturing, logistic and distributing facilities in Russia, Belgium, Lithuania, Brazil, China, Kazakhstan, Estonia, Germany and the USA.

EuroChem Group's Russian subsidiary is called JSC MCC EuroChem.

The company is one of the world's top-5 leading producers of nitrogen, phosphate, potash and complex fertilizers. In 2021, EuroChem had sales revenues of US$10.2bn. In 2022, the company's revenue in Russia amounted to 52 billion rubles.

== History ==
Eurochem bought its first potash mining license in 2005, to develop Gremyachinskoe deposit, located near the town of Kotelnikovo, southwest of Volgograd. It followed up with the purchase of another license area a few years later - the Verkhnekamskoe deposit near Berezniki, Russia's potash stronghold, in 2008. Usolskiy Potash Project produced 2.223 MMT of potash in 2020.

In Kazakhstan, the company started mining phosphate rock from its Kok-Jon mine in the southeast of the country. Eurochem bought out the Kazakh government's stake in Sary-Tas, a Soviet-era fertilizer plant near Karatau, in the south of the country. The company also produces iron ore from its Kovdorsky mine near Murmansk, which is "byproduct", with the majority of the output bought by Chinese buyers.

According to Bloomberg, "the acquisition of a BASF SE plant in Antwerp by EuroChem for 830 million euros ($930 million) brought in new technologies" for the company. BASF sold its fertilizers activities in Antwerp, Belgium, to EuroChem on March 31, 2012. In July 2012, EuroChem completed the acquisition of K+S Nitrogen, a company marketing nitrogenous fertilizers with a focus on major customers in agriculture and special crops such as fruits, vegetables and grapes.

In 2013, EuroChem established a joint venture with Chinese fertiliser producer Migao in order to increase its presence in Asia, producing potassium nitrate and chloride-free complex fertilizers.

EuroChem's US$1 billion ammonia plant, EuroChem Northwest, in Kingisepp, Russia, launched in June 2019, has a production capacity of 1 million tonnes (1MMT) per year, ensuring EuroChem's full self-sufficiency in ammonia. The company approved the construction of EuroChem Northwest 2, a new 1.1 MMT ammonia and 1.4 MMT urea plant, on an adjacent site in Kingisepp, Russia.

In August 2021, EuroChem scored a deal of $410 million with Norvegian chemical company Yara International to take on the Serra do Salitre phosphate project with 350 million tonnes of deposits in Minas Gerais state in the South-West of Brazil. By August 2021, the project is by half ready to be placed under production by 2023.

In December 2021, EuroChem announced the purchase of 51,48% of shares of Brazilian distributor Fertilizantes Heringer S.A. for about 94 mln dollars, meanwhile waiting for the approvement from local Antimonopoly commission.

EuroChem's founder Andrey Melnichenko beneficially held 90% of EuroChem Group AG shares until 9 March 2022, when he resigned as Non-Executive Director of the Board of Directors, and withdrew as the main beneficiary. The resignation came on the same day Melnichenko was included in a European Union sanctions list, a move he claimed had "no justification". Following his resignation and withdrawal as beneficiary of EuroChem, Melnichenko beneficially controlled 0% of its shares.

According to Bloomberg, the company has closed water or steam recycling at its facilities. It uses a technology which limits the water vapour release and enables byproduct heat to warm its fertilizers.

In May and June 2025, EuroChen Azot Chemical Plant in Novomoskovsk, Tula Region, Russia, was attacked by Ukrainian drones, as this plant allegedly produces chemical components for artillery shells.

== Health and safety issues ==
=== Chemical spillage ===
In 2010 EuroChem began constructing a bulk port terminal in Tuapse in the south of Russia. The local environmental organisations accused EuroChem of federal law violation since the construction was taking place in a residential zone. In March 2010, there were reports of a spillage of chemicals at EuroChem's Tuapse terminal while EuroChem was testing the loading of chemical fertilizers onto a tanker. The spillage was later blamed by ecologists for the death of four dolphins at Sochi. Local residents reported a substantial deterioration of air quality claiming that this resulted from the emission at the EuroChem terminal. The local resident's concerns soon led to protests in May 2010 of around 3,000 people against EuroChem. EuroChem denied the company bore any responsibility for the alleged deterioration of air quality in the city. In spite of the denials, EuroChem CEO Dmitri Sterzhnev admitted at a press conference following the protests, that during the test drive of the terminal, the company had in fact violated administrative law and had paid a fine as a result. In June 2011 information about the protests reached Medvedev, who was president at the time and he personally ordered to postpone the launch of Eurochem's terminal in Tuapse.

A series of lawsuits was brought by environmental organizations as well as by local residents in district and regional courts. Ultimately the Krasnodar regional court, supported by an expert from the regional unit of Rospotrebnadzor, the state environmental watchdog, ruled in August 2011 that the construction was lawful. The construction of the terminal has now been completed and the port is operating.

=== Baltic sea ===
According to preliminary Finnish research there is a phosphorus leak in the Luga River in the volume of 1,000 tonnes annually. It may be from the gypsum waste piles of the EuroChem factory near Kingisepp, although EuroChem has denied this. In April 2012, Russian officials arrested environmental expert Seppo Knuuttila, who had been working on behalf of the Finnish Environment Institute and HELCOM. He was interrogated for a total of fourteen hours by the officials, who demanded to have his computer at customs. Mr. Knuuttila was examining Luga river phosphate content, as agreed.

The findings of an investigation by HELCOM, the international ecological association, found Phosphorit in all likelihood responsible for the pollution. Specifically HELCOM accused EuroChem of improperly monitoring phosphorus runoff from its Phosphorit facility, an issue that was also discussed in the Finnish press in January 2012. The Finnish-Russia cooperation on reducing phosphorus in the Baltic Sea is ongoing indicating the ecological problem is still present.

In June 2012, EuroChem and the John Nurminen Foundation agreed to jointly appoint an independent organization to assess the effectiveness and sustainability of the surface water run-off treatment system which was constructed at the Phosphorit factory in March 2012. The system was constructed to purify phosphorus containing surface water run-off, originating in the area adjacent to the factory. In July 2013, the John Nurminen Foundation and EuroChem jointly appointed Atkins, a design, engineering and project management consultancies, to assess a surface run-off treatment system near the Phosphorit fertilizer facility and to conduct monitoring of the Luga River. Atkins will also monitor phosphorus concentrations in the Luga River upstream and downstream of the factory for one year, and calculate river phosphorus loads to the Baltic Sea.

After having become concerned about the condition of the Baltic Sea in 2004, the Board of the John Nurminen Foundation consulted leading experts on the marine environment to find out if the Foundation could play a concrete role in protecting the Baltic Sea. According to the experts, the fastest and most cost-efficient method of improving the condition of the Baltic Sea would be to intervene in the operation of wastewater treatment plants located in its catchment area by intensifying their phosphorus removal. The three largest wastewater treatment plants in St. Petersburg were chosen as the first target. By making their phosphorus removal more effective, the Gulf of Finland's phosphorus load usable for algae can be reduced by almost 27%. According to the Finnish Environment Institute, this is the quickest and most cost-effective way to improve the open sea condition of the Gulf of Finland, when comparing all possible water protection measures in Finland and Russia. The measure will visibly reduce the algae growth in the Gulf of Finland after just a few years, provided that the other surrounding circumstances do not change considerably.

=== Worker facilities ===
In May 2009 a warehouse for mineral fertilizer at the Tuapse Buker Terminal partially collapsed killing two contractors present. An investigation into the accident was launched by regional authorities.

=== Fires ===
In July 2012, two fires took place at the EuroChem's Nevinnomysski Azot, which is based in the Stavropol region in South-West Russia and primarily produces nitrogen-based fertilizers. According to Russian media no toxic emissions or injuries emanated from the fires.

== Financing ==
In April 2013 the Russian newspaper Vedomosti reported that EuroChem was looking to take a loan of US$700 million to finance its current development projects. In August 2013, EuroChem announced that it has signed a new debut US$1,3 billion unsecured loan facility on a club basis. The proceeds were used to pay down the outstanding amount under EuroChem's 2011 US$1.3 billion pre-export facility.

S&P Global Market Intelligence (formerly SNL Financial) reported in 2015 that "the company has managed to tap investors in recent years, including a US$750 million project finance facility, a US$1.3 billion syndicated loan and a US$750 million Eurobond issue". According to Olivier Harvey, then-head of investor relations at the company, "despite the whopping US$7 billion price tag for both potash projects, much of the outlay can be funded over time by Eurochem's free cash flows", while "the devaluation of the Russian ruble was delivering huge cost savings to the company's CapEx program."

According to Fitch, in 2016, Eurochem "signed an agreement for a perpetual shareholder loan of up to USD1 billion" noting that its "diversification into all three nutrients (nitrogen, phosphate and potash), vertical integration and strong cost position support a business profile commensurate with an investment grade rating" and that its scale "is on a par with that of large fertiliser peers" such as CF Industries et al.

In February 2017, Andrey Melnichenko revealed that EuroChem was not planning an IPO in the next few years as the company "has sufficient funds to independently finance its investment program".

In June 2018, Moody's assessed that it "positively notes that EuroChem has a contractual loan agreement with its majority shareholder, which allows it to attract up to $1 billion of a perpetual zero-interest loan to support its liquidity." It noted that, according to its rationale, EuroChem's strengths included:

1. the company's strong business profile, underpinned by its large scale of operations, diversified product mix, and established positions in the global and regional fertilizer markets;
2. sustainable cost competitiveness, which supports relatively high margins, additionally helped by the weakness of the rouble;
3. potential for deleveraging; and
4. proved access to long-term external funding, including a shareholder loan facility, which support liquidity.

== Litigation ==
=== Shaft Sinkers ===
In 2012, Eurochem filed suit against Shaft Sinkers, the London-listed South African mining engineering company that had been contracted to construct the shafts at the EuroChem-VolgaKaliy potash site. Soon after starting work on the cage shaft, things started to go wrong; the grouting technology that Shaft Sinkers used failed, and the shaft later suffered water inflow. According to EuroChem's Clark Bailey, the failure and the flooding of the shaft that led to the lawsuit delayed completion at Volgakaliy project by more than two years.

In 2015, EuroChem-VolgaKaliy won in the Swiss Arbitration Court, which awarded EuroChem-VolgaKaliy around $140m in damages and legal costs. In 2016, EuroChem settled US$1 billion suit against Shaft Sinkers over potash shaft failure. Shaft Sinkers was later declared insolvent, and its listing on the London Stock Exchange was withdrawn.

=== Ukraine anti-dumping duties ===
In September 2019, the WTO Appellate Body ruled that anti-dumping duties imposed by Ukraine on ammonium nitrate imports from Russia are violating WTO rules, specifically Article 5.8 of the WTO Anti-Dumping Agreement. The court thereby upheld Russia's claim that Kyiv should have excluded EuroChem, arguing that its dumping had been minimal.

== Assets ==
Nitrogen assets

- Novomoskovskiy Azot (nitrogen fertilizers, urea)
- Nevinnomysskiy Azot (nitrogen and compound fertilizers, ammonia, industrial gases, organic synthesis products)
- EuroChem North-West (ammonia)
- EuroChem Antwerpen (NPK and AN/CAN units, nitrophosphoric acid plant)
- EuroChem Migao (potassium nitrate and complex fertilizers)

Phosphates assets

- Lifosa (phosphate fertilizers, premium-quality commercial DAP and feed phosphates)
- Phosphorit (phosphate fertilizers and feed phosphates)
- EuroChem-BMU (phosphate and compound fertilizers)

Potash assets

- EuroChem-VolgaKaliy - Gremyachinskoe deposit, Volgograd region (potash)
- EuroChem-Usolskiy Potash Complex - Verkhnekamskoe Deposit, Perm region (potash)

== Peers ==
- Agrium
- CF Industries
- Israel Chemicals
- K+S
- Phosagro
- PotashCorp
- The Mosaic Company
- Uralkali
- Yara International
