= Social entrepreneurship in Russia =

Social entrepreneurship in Russia is in its infancy. Its origin as a phenomenon of the post-Soviet history of the country should be attributed to the first half of the 2000s, although similar initiatives of individual enthusiasts occasionally took place already in the 1990s, and prototypes of social and entrepreneurial activity can be found also in earlier periods, up to the turn of the XIX-XX centuries.

The systematic development of this area of business activity has started in the second half of the 2000s in Russia and it was associated, first of all, with the emergence of a number of strong systemic private players developing infrastructure, stimulating social entrepreneurs, developing and promoting the theoretical base. Through their efforts, ideas of social entrepreneurship are conveyed to the legislative and executive authorities, the business communities, society in general and potential social entrepreneurs, which gradually creates, formalizes and structures this area. Since the early 2010s, Social Innovation Centers (SICs) have emerged in Russia, which provide training in social entrepreneurship methods and support existing projects.

As of the end of 2020, the popularity of social entrepreneurship in Russia remains low: no more than 1% of Russian entrepreneurs are engaged in social business. Their contribution to the country's GDP in 2015 was 0.36%. More than half of Russian social entrepreneurs are women aged 30–60.

A number of sustainable projects are operating in Russia, mainly in the areas of farming, recycling of certain types of household waste, supporting for the disabled and elderly persons and graduates of orphanages as well, the revival of folk crafts, local tourism, but they also cannot boast of an unconditional success, scale of activity, and even more the replicability of their experience. Large problem areas of paramount importance, such as drug addiction, alcoholism, unemployment, general low living standards, corruption and bureaucracy, are left out of the scope of social entrepreneurs.

Among the reasons for the low popularity of social entrepreneurship in Russia, one should single out the general lack of formation of the class of traditional entrepreneurs, from which representatives of social business should later stand out, insufficient awareness] and poor elaboration of the theoretical base. The curtailment of the work of international non-profit organizations in Russia since the early 2000s, the lack of real support at the federal level for a number of traditional social entrepreneurs activities and the scarcity of the legislative framework also hinder progress in this area.

On July 26, 2019, Law No. 245-FL “On Amendments to the Federal Law “On the Development of Small and Medium-Sized Businesses in the Russian Federation” in terms of consolidating the concepts of “social entrepreneurship”, “social enterprise”» entered into force in Russia.

== History ==
=== Russian Empire ===
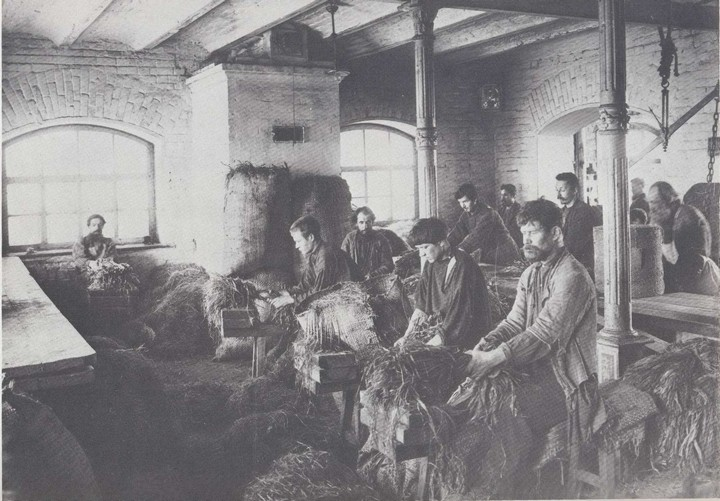
In the Rukavishnikovs House of Diligence, Nizhny Novgorod

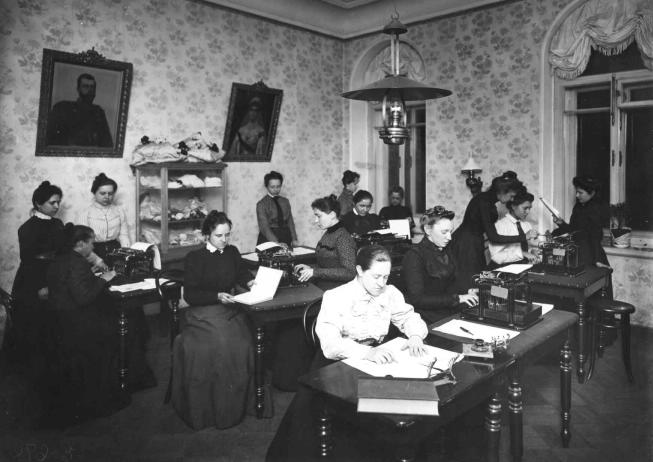
Teaching typing on a typewriter at the House of Diligence for Educated Women on Znamenskaya st. (Saint Petersburg) Around 1900, Karl Bulla's photo studio

The Houses of Diligence, which were transformed from workhouses at the end of the 19th century, are considered one of the historical examples of social entrepreneurship in Russia.

The workhouses that appeared in Russia in the 18th century for a long time were remained, first of all, as a part of the penal system. They were aimed at isolating and forcing criminals and other asocial elements to work. The idea of a workhouse, borrowed from the experience of European countries, did not take root in Russia: for more than a hundred years, only a few workhouses were opened throughout the empire, and most of them were closed soon after opening. In contrast to the typical workhouse, the House of Diligence in Kronstadt, founded by the rector of St. Andrew's Cathedral in Kronstadt, Father John, and Baron Otto von Buxhoeveden in 1882, was created on ideas of mercy and charity; finding and working were voluntary there.

Through the efforts of Baron von Buxhoeveden, and also thanks to the patronage of Grand Duchess Alexandra Iosifovna, the experience of arranging Houses of Diligence was quickly spread throughout the empire. By the time of the October Revolution, which put an end to the public solution to the problems of poverty, there were hundreds Houses of Diligence, they were represented in most large cities of Russia.

=== The Soviet Union ===
The young Soviet state declared a monopoly on solving social problems. It also sought to eradicate individual entrepreneurial activity, replacing it with a collective approach to economic management. Under such conditions, legal social entrepreneurship could not exist. At the same time, some researchers point to the implementation of the principles of social entrepreneurship in the Soviet period, under the control of the state. First of all, this applied to the employment of disabled people. In particular, visually impaired people were engaged in the production of string bags, the proceeds from the sale of which were directed to additional financing of the houses for disabled persons.

The period of a significant softening of the principles of Soviet collectivism fell on the 1920s, after the New Economic Policy (NEP) was adopted on March 14, 1921, by the 10th Congress of the Russian Communist Party (Bolsheviks), which replaced the "military communism" that operated during the Civil War. Feeling freedom, private entrepreneurs very soon achieved noticeable successes that allowed them to solve their own social issues, while filling the market with goods and services. However, the NEP period was short-lived, and history has not preserved any examples of enterprises that could be classified as social.

Having fulfilled the mission of strengthening Soviet power, the NEP was phased out by the end of the 1920s. For decades, NEPman turned into a cultural antihero, and any private enterprise was equated with the extraction of "unearned income". This situation persisted until the end of the 1980s, when in a disintegrating state, the economy of which found itself in the deepest crisis again, entrepreneurial activity was allowed in a form of industrial cooperation.

=== Russian Federation ===
In conditions of insufficient information and lack of a theoretical basis, the first social entrepreneurs in modern Russia did not initially identify with this concept. One of the earliest examples of a social enterprise should be considered the street newspaper Na Dne (since 2003 - Put Domoi), which has been distributed since 1994 by homeless people of St. Petersburg.

In the 1990s, microfinance, traditionally referred to as social entrepreneurship, emerged in Russia. By the end of the 20th century, there was a need for an organization representing the interests of the entire microfinance movement, and in 2002, the Russian Microfinance Center (RMC) was established.

A precedent for the institutionalization of social entrepreneurship was created in 2003 in Novosibirsk, where the Center for Social Entrepreneurship was founded at the Institute of Additional Education of NSTU. The center was engaged in paid training of students and then supported them in the implementation of innovative social ideas. Since this project was funded by the international donor Tempus TACIS, and partners were three universities of the UK, Germany and Italy, the Center used foreign experience and the best international practices. In the first years of its operation, the Center itself worked on the principles of social entrepreneurship, enjoyed the support of the regional administration, and a youth business incubator was created under it. However, soon, with the exhaustion of grant funds, the topics of the courses shifted towards traditional business management, and then any works in the field of supporting social entrepreneurship were ceased.

The first case of interest in social entrepreneurship on the part of Russian business, probably, belongs to 2003 also - the aluminum company RUSAL launched the program “One Hundred Cool Projects”. The project was implemented as a competition for high school students in the regions where RUSAL operates. Schoolchildren proposed projects for solving local social problems and received assistance in their implementation on a competitive basis. Thus, a number of projects were implemented to help veterans, pensioners, orphans, homeless animals, as well as a project to preserve local nature and culture. In themselves, all these projects were not social and entrepreneurial, but charitable (since they provided only one-time targeted assistance), but the involvement of schools, boarding schools, orphanages, specialized educational institutions in their implementation allows us to speak of the presence of elements of social business practices in them.

In 2004, the Youth Bank "Tolyatti Fund" was founded, created by "Lada-credit" Bank on the Northern Irish model. Young people gained access to the management of the bank (under the supervision of a more experienced adviser-curator), financing social, mainly also youth projects.

The systemic development of support for social entrepreneurship in Russia begins in the second half of the 2000s.

Since the beginning of the 2010s, Centers of Innovation in the Social Sphere (CISS) are appearing in different regions of the country, training in social entrepreneurship practices is conducting and support for social and entrepreneurial projects is providing.

In 2019, Russia adopted a law on social entrepreneurship, designed to provide financial and other support to social business. To implement the provisions of the adopted law, information on the status of “social entrepreneurs” is entered into the register of small and medium-sized businesses.

The consequences of the COVID-19 pandemic in 2020 were a heavy blow to social enterprises in Russia. Since 2022, social entrepreneurship in Russia has existed in the conditions of economic transformation caused by international sanctions. In April 2022, a program to support social entrepreneurs and NGOs in crisis conditions was announced. The competitive grant program of financing and training "Start differently" is organized by Rosbank and Impact Hub Moscow.

To solve their problems, Russian social entrepreneurs organize themselves into associations. As of 2022, there are more than 10 regional Associations of social entrepreneurs operating in the country.

== Support for social entrepreneurship ==
=== Support from major businesses ===
The Russian large businesses were the first to draw attention to this area of business activity, which was engaged in the design of the social and entrepreneurial infrastructure within the framework of its own charitable activities and corporate social responsibility. For 2017, such backbone companies as Lukoil, Rusal, SUEK, Severstal, Metalloinvest and others have supporting programs for social entrepreneurship.

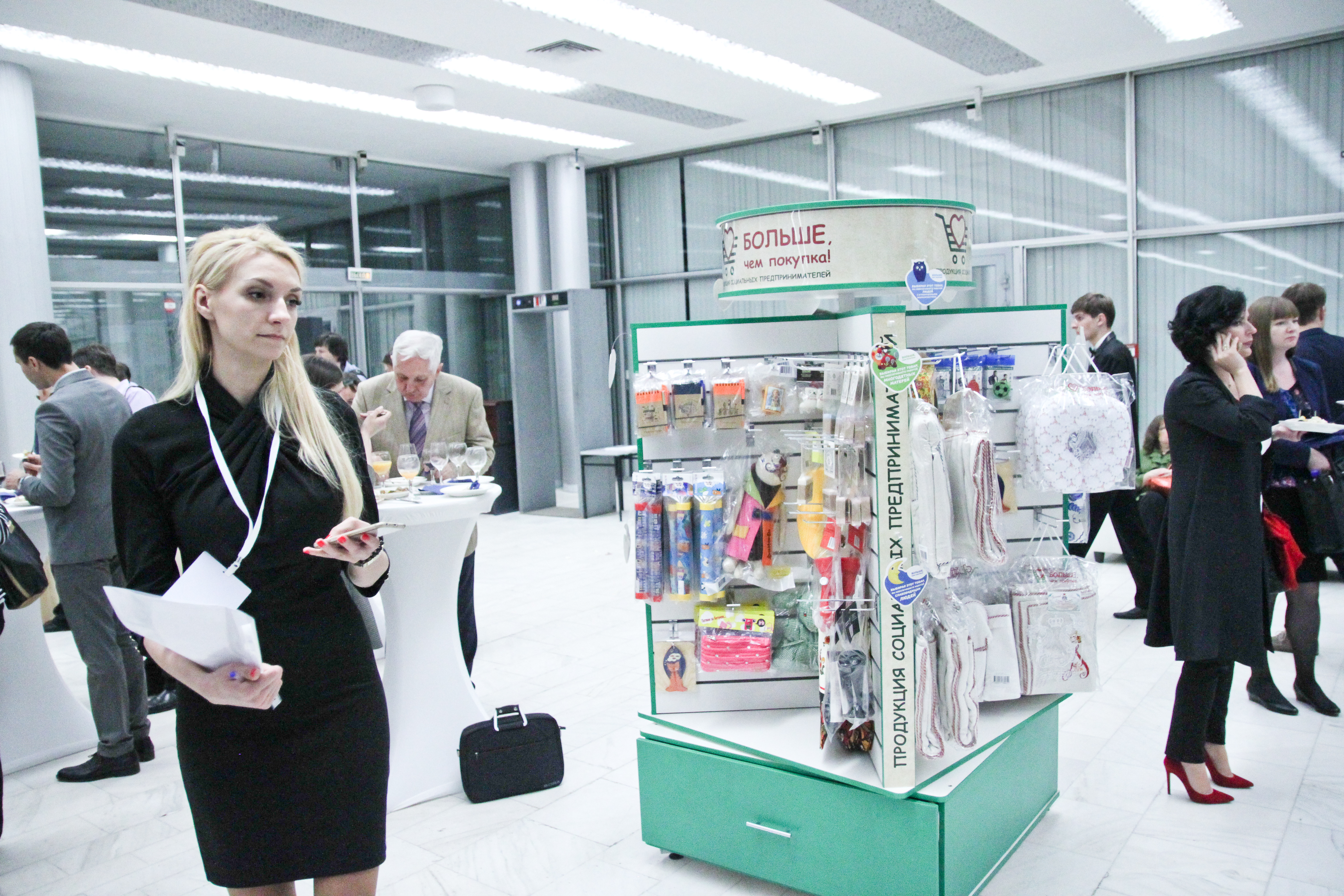
The "More than a purchase!" stand at the "Impulse of Kindness" award ceremony, 2016

Oleg Deripaska's Rusal company pays notable attention to social activities, considering it as part of its development strategy. In 2004, the Center for Social Programs was founded to manage Rusal's social projects. In 2010, the company announced the RUSAL Territory program, within the framework of which 50 projects were implemented with an investment of RUB 150 million.

In 2014, the Lukoil company, together with the Our Future Foundation, launched the More than a Purchase! project to promote goods of Russian social entrepreneurs. The project was launched in a form of competition, and the winners are able to sell their goods in the stores of the Lukoil filling station network in most of the regions of Russia. By the end of 2016, according to the fund itself, 134 gas stations in 14 regions of Russia were connected to the project.

The classical banking sector also pays attention to social entrepreneurship, conducting research and offering special programs in this area. In some banks, for example, JSC "SME Bank "(Vnesheconombank), there was no special product for social entrepreneurs for 2015, but it was possible to lend at a reduced rate for a number of projects, which included social entrepreneurship projects[50]. The largest Russian coal company SUEK implements its social programs through the fund for social and economic support of the regions (“SUEK-to-Regions”). The Foundation operates in 48 settlements of Russia. Among the programs is the competition of social and entrepreneurial projects "Sozidanie", held in two stages - regional and interregional. The winners receive financial and organizational support at the start of their projects.

The Severstal Metallurgical Plant, located in Cherepovets, together with the City Hall, co-founded the "Agency for Urban Development", on the basis of which the "Regional Center for Social Innovations" was organized. In this center, social entrepreneurs receive free assistance and support: accounting, legal and financial-economic. The center has a school of social entrepreneurship.

Other large companies also have their own programs to support social entrepreneurship, such as Nornickel, Metalloinvest, United Metallurgical Company (UMC), etc.

The classical banking sector also pays attention to social entrepreneurship, conducting research and offering special programs in this area. Some banks, for example, Vnesheconombank, had no special product for social entrepreneurs for 2015, but it was possible to lend at a reduced rate for a number of projects, social entrepreneurship projects included.

=== Institutional support ===
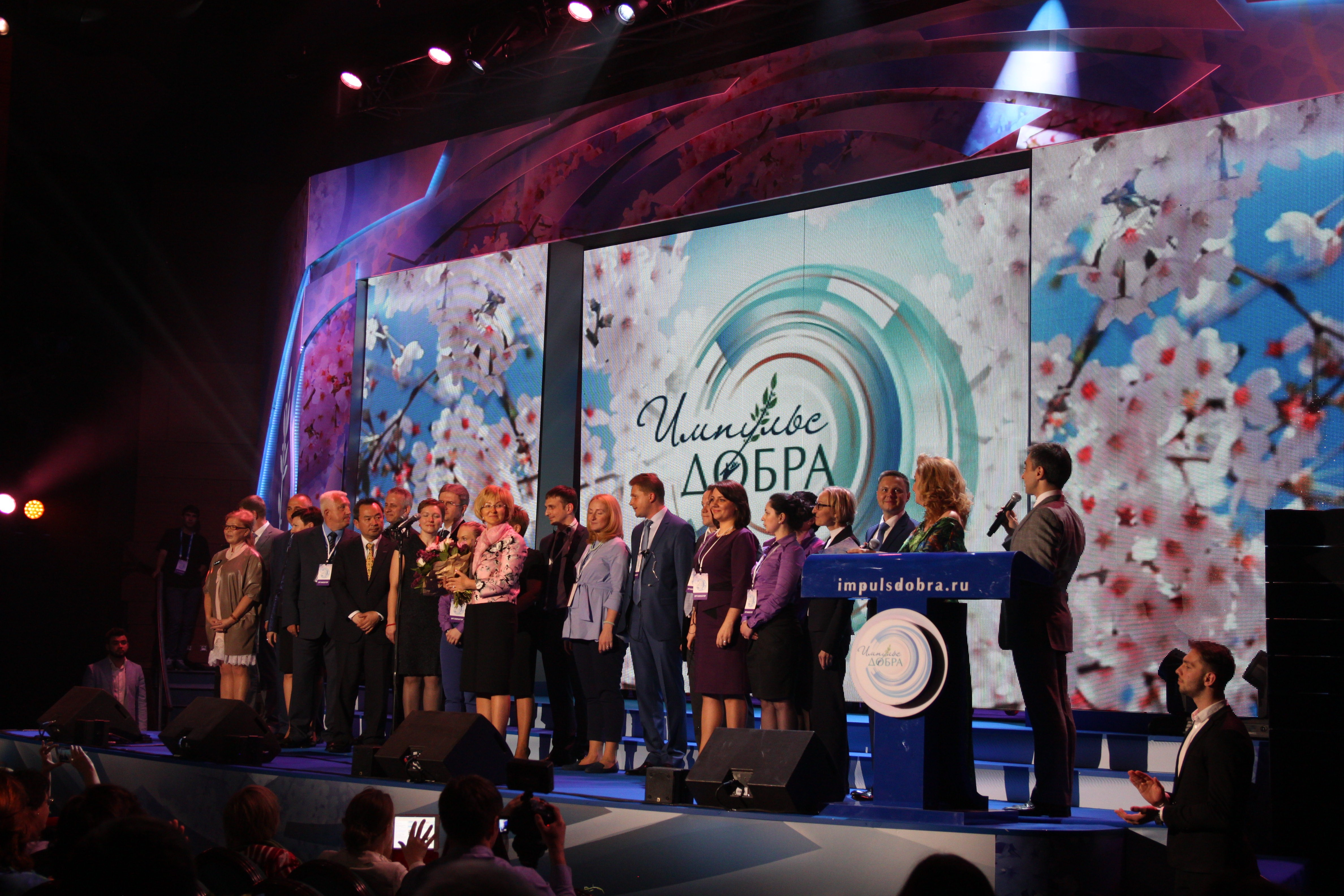
Impulse of Kindness Award for social entrepreneurship, 2015

A number of institutions of the systematic support of social entrepreneurship in Russia are also rooted in major business. On an ongoing basis, such support is provided by the private Our Future Foundation, which, according to a number of experts, takes the leading role in this area. The fund was founded by the president of the oil company "Lukoil" Vagit Alekperov. The main types of support provided by the fund are financial (loans, grants and equity participation) and consulting (direct consultations, training, assistance in exchanging experience, building relationships with other organizations, forming communities of social entrepreneurs and enterprises). The Fund issues interest-free loans to both start-up entrepreneurs and active businesses. As of 2021, the fund, according to its own data, supported 312 social entrepreneurship projects located in 59 regions of Russia, 787.97 million rubles were allocated for their implementation. Among the main infrastructure projects of the fund: the All-Russian competition "Social Entrepreneur", the Laboratory of Social Entrepreneurship, the program "More than a Purchase!", opening access to retail chains for social entrepreneurs, the "Impulse of Kindness" award for contribution to the development and promotion of social entrepreneurship in Russia. The Foundation also performs a popularizing and educational function - it publishes literature on social business, supports thematic portals: "New Business: Social Entrepreneurship" and "Bank of Social Ideas", conducts research, organizes scientific and public discussions. With the support of the Our Future Foundation, from 2015 to 2019, the reference catalog "Social Entrepreneurship of Russia" was published — a project of the Gladway Foundation for the Development of Media Projects and Social Programs distributed free of charge in pdf format. In 2021, the quarterly bilingual (Russian-English) magazine "Positive Changes" became the successor of this project.

The Agency for Strategic Initiatives to Promote New Projects (Agency for Strategic Initiatives, ASI) is an autonomous non-profit organization created by the Government of Russia in 2011. The agency declares support for projects in several areas: innovative business, search and attraction of talented young leaders, promotion and replication of socially significant initiatives. ASI has developed a "roadmap" for "supporting access of non-governmental organizations to the provision of services in the social sphere", the document was approved by the government in June 2016.

The public organization of small and medium-sized businesses Support of Russia deals, among other things, with the development of social entrepreneurship in Russia. In the regional branches of the organization there are committees for social entrepreneurship. The Opora-Sozidanie project appeals to the traditions of charity and patronage of Russian entrepreneurship and is declared as aimed at the development of socially responsible entrepreneurship, the dissemination of practices and models of corporate, charitable and socially oriented activities. The peculiarity of the project is the introduction of Orthodox ethics into entrepreneurial activity (the sophianic nature of the economy).

The Russian Union of Industrialists and Entrepreneurs (RUIE) also systematically promotes ideas and principles of social entrepreneurship. The RUIE has a Department of Corporate Responsibility, Sustainable Development and Social Entrepreneurship. An annual all-Russian competition of the RUIE is held, reports and round tables at conferences within the framework of the Russian Business Week are devoted to the issues of social entrepreneurship. In May 2016, the President of the RUIE, Alexander Shokhin, was awarded the Impulse of Kindness prize from the Our Future Foundation for supporting and promoting social entrepreneurship.

The Junior Achievement Russia, an interregional public organization, implements a number of specialized training programs for entrepreneurs, including the Social Entrepreneurship program for young people aged 15–18, as well as master classes for social entrepreneurs.

The Reach for Change Charity Foundation supports projects aimed at improving the lives of children and adolescents on a competitive basis. Anyone can participate in the competition whose projects meet a number of conditions: social impact, scalability, financial stability, and the possibility of long-term development. Winning projects receive financial support, including salary payments for the initiator of the project for the period of its formation, as well as advice and training from the Fund's partners.

Support for social entrepreneurship is also declared through microfinance organizations, which, according to 2015 data, were more than 600 in Russia. Since 2002, the Russian Microfinance Center (RMC) has been operating in Russia, which organizes joint projects together with the Gramin Creative Laboratory, Yunus Centre and Yunus Social Business. The RMC is actively engaged in charity work, its representatives participate in a public discussion on the concept of state support for social entrepreneurship in the country.

Among other public institutions that consistently support social entrepreneurship in Russia, we can distinguish the Chamber of Commerce and Industry of Russia and the Civic Chamber of Russia.

In June 2022, a coalition of participants in the social entrepreneurship support infrastructure was formed in Russia. The initiator of the coalition was the Social Projects Support Fund established by the Agency for Strategic Initiatives. The coalition includes 15 organizations: Our Future Foundation, Elena and Gennady Timchenko Charitable Foundation, Social Investment Fund, Help Needed Foundation, Center for General Academic Educational Initiatives (RANEPA), Positive Change Factory, Social Information Agency, National Qualifications Development Agency, Impact Hub Moscow, Center for Social Entrepreneurship and Social Innovation (Higher School of Economics), the International Business School of the Financial University under the Government of the Russian Federation and others.

The world's leading fund for support of social entrepreneurs Ashoka (USA) is not represented in Russia due to restrictions on the activities of foreign NPOs, but Russian social entrepreneurs can contact it through the official website. The Foundation both provides financial support and conducts trainings for social entrepreneurs, as well as promotes their projects and encourages information exchange.

=== Social entrepreneurship trainings ===
In 2011, the Omsk regional public organization "Resource Center of Community Active Schools" opened the country's first "School of Social Entrepreneurship". The next year, 2012, at the suggestion of the Agency for Strategic Initiatives to Promote New Projects (ASI), the Resource Center was transformed into the first Social Innovation Center in Russia (SIC). In 2013, it was decided to replicate this experience with the support from ASI. For 2016, SICs are represented in more than 25 regions of Russia, and their number is increasing. Some of them have schools of social entrepreneurship, in which training usually lasts 2–6 months. For 2018, one Omsk School of Social Entrepreneurship has completed more than 30 graduating classes, more than 800 of its graduates have founded more than 500 projects in the field of social entrepreneurship.

In addition to educational, SICs provide versatile support to social projects of small and medium-sized businesses: informational, consulting, mentoring, legal, logistics, organizational, popularization - with the exception of financial one, witch can be provided by regional foundations, business incubators, associations of entrepreneurs. In 2013, RUSAL opened a SIC in Krasnoyarsk, whose activities are aimed at involving people with entrepreneurial activity, as well as heads of small and medium-sized businesses and socially oriented non-profit organizations in solving social problems of the regions through the implementation of social and entrepreneurial projects. RUSAL became the first representative of large business to support the creation of SICs.

The MSU Graduate School of Management and Innovation program includes a full academic course in social entrepreneurship. The course is paid, lasting 72 academic hours, taught by teachers of the Faculty of Law and the Faculty of Public Administration of Moscow State University. Among the disciplines of the course: business planning, financial management, modern experience in the development of social entrepreneurship.

The Center for Social Entrepreneurship and Social Innovation at the Higher School of Economics also offers lectures and courses on social entrepreneurship.

Since 2015, St. Petersburg State University has been running a training program for social entrepreneurs, with the opportunity to listen to lectures remotely and with subsequent mandatory certification.

=== Governmental support ===
Although attempts to support social entrepreneurship are noted at the federal and regional levels in Russia, they lack consistency, and, as a consequence, the effectiveness of this activity remains questionable. Unlike many countries, social entrepreneurship in Russia is not recognized as a special type of economic activity, social entrepreneurs do not receive tax benefits. The “Law on Social Entrepreneurship” adopted in 2019 separates social entrepreneurship into an area of small and medium-sized businesses, thus, this type of economic activity has received its own federal legislative framework. But even after that, social entrepreneurs, as before, can rely only on targeted financial, property, information, and consulting support from the state.

In fact, the task of systemic support of social entrepreneurs in Russia has been transferred to the regional authorities and the Social Innovation Centers (SICs) (created by Order of the Ministry of Economic Development of Russia No. 220 dated 04.24.2013 and financed by subsidies from the federal budget) and subsidies by Decree of the Government of the Russian Federation dated 23.08 .11 No. 713 "On providing support to socially oriented non-profit organizations". In particular, for 2011–2013, the Ministry of Economic Development of Russia allocated budget funds in the total amount of 880 million rubles for the implementation of measures to support socially oriented NPOs, of which 600 million - for subsidies to regional budgets, 132 million - for direct subsidies of socially oriented NPOs, 100 million - to train socially oriented employees of non-profit organizations.

As of August 2014, with the support of the Agency for Strategic Initiatives (ASI) and the Ministry of Economic Development, 12 social innovation centers began to operate, but the results of their activities for 2015 did not receive wide coverage in specialized publications. The 2015 budget allocated 160 million rubles to subsidize projects to attract a private investor to the social services sector. By mid-2019, the number of SICs reached 38; by 2024, it is planned to increase their number to 70.

In 2017, on the initiative of the General Director of the Agency for Strategic Initiatives Svetlana Chupsheva and with the approval of President Vladimir Putin, the federal Fund for the Support of Social Projects was founded. In her statement, Chupsheva named the country's regions that were leading at that time in this indicator: Khanty-Mansi Autonomous Okrug, Bashkortostan, Perm Krai, Murmansk Oblast, Ulyanovsk Oblast, St. Petersburg.

In August 2021, within the framework of the national project "Small and Medium-sized Entrepreneurship", it was decided to provide financial support to social enterprises in the regions. By the end of the year, social entrepreneurs were offered to receive gratuitous grant assistance for business development on a competitive basis. The grant amount was up to 500 thousand rubles in Russia and up to 1 million rubles for the Arctic zone. 1.2 billion rubles were allocated for the implementation of this program. At the same time, social entrepreneurs were ordered to find 50% of the required amount in the form of co-financing. In 2022, the requirement to attract co-financing was relaxed - up to 25% of the total amount.

== State and problems of social entrepreneurship in Russia ==
Social entrepreneurship in Russia, although it has historical roots, is not developed, and there are very few entrepreneurs acting according to its canons. It is usually expressed in individual initiatives, and not in a mass movement. According to the Agency for Strategic Initiatives, in 2017, only about 1% of companies were engaged in social entrepreneurship in Russia in one form or another, while in Western Europe this figure reaches 25%. In Russia, there were only about 6.8 thousand enterprises, which can be classified as social.

The only large-scale comprehensive study of social entrepreneurship in Russia is the project of the Russian Microfinance Center and the British organization Oxfam, carried out in 2008–2009. The researchers drew conclusions about the “beginning of the path” of Russian social entrepreneurship, as well as the novelty and lack of a common understanding of this term in Russian society. At the same time, in the course of research in Russia, all the necessary conditions for the development of social entrepreneurship were found. As a result of this project, A. A. Moskovskaya wrote the monograph “Social Entrepreneurship in Russia and the World. Practice and Research ”, which remains the most detailed and cited work on this topic.

In 2016 and 2019, the charity Thomson Reuters Foundation surveyed nearly 900 social entrepreneurship experts from 45 of the world's largest economies. The respondents included researchers, social entrepreneurs, investors, officials and other competent persons. The survey resulted in a ranking of countries with the best conditions for social entrepreneurs. In 2019, Russia was in the middle or top half of the list by almost all indicators, while showing significant growth, with the exception of the ease of sale of goods and services. The researchers concluded that there is an increase in social entrepreneurship in Russia, but the overall level of entrepreneurial activity remains low.

Rating of Russia's attractiveness for social entrepreneurs among the 45 largest economies in the world
| | 2019 | 2016 |
|---|---|---|
| Starting conditions | 28 | 40 |
| Governmental support | 7 | 17 |
| Availability of grants | 24 | 31 |
| Investment availability | 25 | 27 |
| Availability of non-financial support | 12 | 17 |
| Ease of selling goods and services to the state | 22 | 16 |
| Ease of selling goods and services to businesses | 38 | 31 |
| Ease of selling goods and services to a private consumer | 23 | 6 |
| Attracting high-level specialists | 38 | 36 |
| Understanding by the population of the essence of social entrepreneurship | 23 | 27 |
| The ability to support yourself by doing social business | 7 | 8 |
| Growth rates of social entrepreneurship | 23 | 43 |
| Share of women among social entrepreneurs | 6 (73,77%) | 2 (78,1%) |
| Share of youth (under 25) among social entrepreneurs | 41 (66,93%) | - |

The vice-president of the public organization "Support of Russia" Nikolai Nikolayev identified three crisis phenomena that the emerging social entrepreneurship faced in Russia: the crisis of definition, the crisis of representativeness and the problem of replication.

=== Achievements of social entrepreneurs ===
The first medical alarm project in Russia Life Button, an emergency call system for the elderly and disabled, became the winner of the All-Russian Entrepreneurial Competition "Business Innovative Technologies 2011", as well as the "Telecom Idea" competition established by MTS, and was included in the list of 10 best startups of 2011 according to Forbes.

In 2017, the product of social entrepreneurship - the project for the production of technical means of rehabilitation for disabled children “I Can!” from the Sverdlovsk region - became the winner of the All-Russian competition “100 Best Goods of Russia” for the first time.

=== Theoretical base problem ===
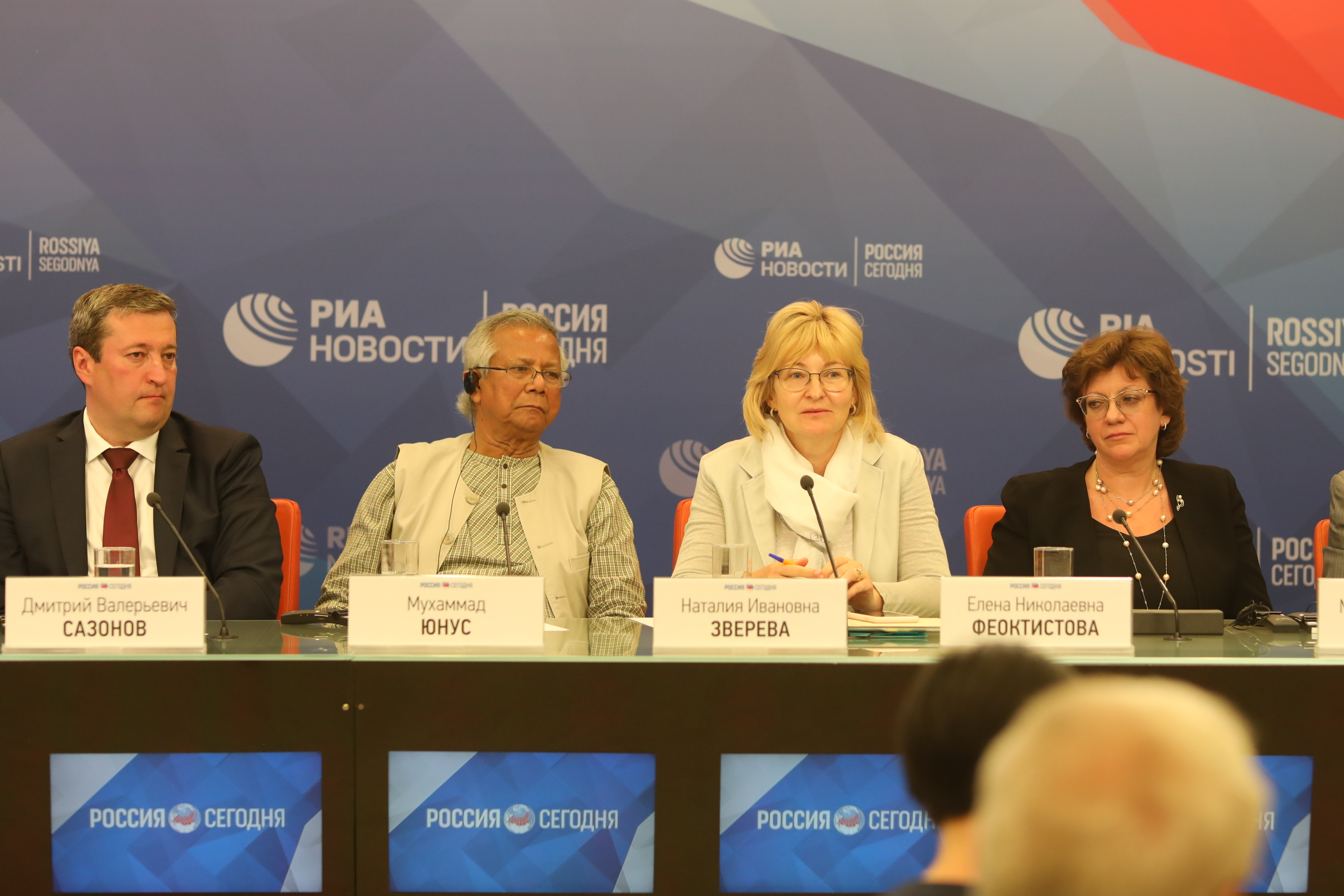
Press conference organized by the Our Future Foundation, with the participation of Grameen Bank founder and Nobel Prize laureate Muhammad Yunus, July 2, 2019

Certain difficulties are created by a weak theoretical base, insufficient awareness and education of citizens. Generally, in Russia, the theory of social entrepreneurship is not sufficiently formalized and has not received proper distribution yet. Experts and the scientific community do not come to a consensus on classifying a particular activity in Russia as social entrepreneurship. On the one hand, it is noted that many "serial" projects that have already been tested abroad are not yet implemented in Russia - for example, in the field of housing and employment of people without a fixed place of residence, few projects in the field of ecology, and a number of others. On the other hand, the relevance of traditional “classic” projects of social entrepreneurship is being questioned.

In addition, experts note that in Russia social business is often confused with charity. Genuine Russian social entrepreneurs rarely define themselves by this fashionable phrase, while various imitators, on the contrary, actively use it to gain access to grants, loans, various preferences, for the purpose of PR or as a marketing ploy.

Nikolai Nikolaev notes that with all the variety of definitions of social entrepreneurship in Russia, there are two opposite in meaning: "entrepreneurial activity aimed at solving social and environmental problems and achieving socially useful goals", which corresponds to the classical understanding, and "entrepreneurship in the social sphere" aimed at making a profit. According to the expert, the second definition, in contrast to the desirable first one, is closer and more understandable to Russian legislators and statesmen.

In 2016, Natalia Zvereva, Director of the Our Future Foundation, said that the problem of identifying and assessing social business in Russia is “a thing of the past” and “we can say that an expert community has been formed in the country with professional skills and competencies in the field of assessment social and entrepreneurial projects.”

However, an expert study from 2020 to 2021 showed that the problem of the ambiguity of the concept of “social entrepreneurship” has not disappeared. Even experts in the field of social business adhered to its different interpretations, and one of the respondents rated the degree of legal certainty of the concept of “social entrepreneurship” at 2 points out of 10. About a third of the experts could not choose a definition close to them from the proposed options and formulated their own. The terminological problem caused a large scatter in the estimates for the rest of the survey items and, as a result, was recognized as the basic one for the entire field of social business.

=== The problem of representativeness ===
According to Nikolayev, in Russia there is a situation where "there are more experts than social entrepreneurs themselves." At the same time, new infrastructural elements of support for social business continue to be created, which does not lead to the expected increase in the number of social entrepreneurs. In general, there is a disproportion: high activity on the part of experts and the state “from above” with low activity of citizens “from below.”

If experts and philanthropists from big business are driven by enthusiasm, then the state in the person of officials sees in “social entrepreneurship” a universal means of solving accumulated social problems. However, the efforts of both are sometimes frustrated by the passivity of potential social entrepreneurs. Anton Yaremchuk (ASI) sees the main problem of the Russian social entrepreneur precisely in his “dependent approach, the feeling that the state owes him something personally”.

As for the efforts of the state, A. Moskovskaya, commenting on the project of the Ministry of Economic Development on the creation of Innovation Centers in the social sphere and the ASI's forecasts to receive 50 thousand socially-oriented enterprises by 2020, noted that “social entrepreneurship is not created according to the plan in any country” and that such initiatives should not come "from above", but should be "born by the business itself".

=== Replication problem ===
Replicability, one of the main features of a business that claims to be social, is also not doing well in Russia. Virtually every relatively successful social enterprise lives on the energy, charisma, and other personal qualities of its founder. If he leaves the social enterprise he created, it either ceases to exist, or will soon be transformed into an ordinary business project.

=== Legal regulation ===
Due to the insufficient elaboration of the theoretical base in the legislation of the Russian Federation, for a long time there was no separate general legal section on social entrepreneurship. There was no legal framework that could regulate all issues of social entrepreneurship, simplify the creation of social enterprises and reduce taxes for social entrepreneurs.

Until 2019, the only federal legislative act containing the definition of social entrepreneurship was the order of the Ministry of Economic Development of Russia dated April 24, 2013 N 220 “On organizing the competitive selection of the constituent entities of the Russian Federation, whose budgets in 2013 are provided with subsidies from the federal budget for state support of small and medium entrepreneurship". That definition was applied only to recipients of support along the line indicated by the Ministry and, according to experts, was vague, terminologically imperfect and, in fact, did not provide legislative support for social entrepreneurship in the classical sense, especially in all the variety of its forms.

In September 2013, the Federation Council Committee on Social Policy prepared amendments to the draft law “On the Fundamentals of Social Services to the Population in the Russian Federation”, introducing the terms “social entrepreneur” and “social entrepreneurship” into federal legislation, but they were not adopted. The next attempt was made on October 16, 2014: a group of parliamentarians from the Upper and Lower Chambers of the Federal Assembly introduced a bill on social entrepreneurship and forms of support to the State Duma, but it was not adopted either.

In August 2016, the Ministry of Economic Development came up with an initiative to amend the current legislation in order to consolidate the concept of "social entrepreneurship" in it. Discussion of the draft federal law took place on the "Federal Portal of Draft Normative Legal Acts". It was based on a bill introduced a year earlier by Galina Karelova, Lyudmila Bokova and a number of other senators and deputies with the support of the Russian Union of Industrialists and Entrepreneurs and its president, Alexander Shokhin, personally. The authors proposed to make appropriate amendments and additions to federal laws No. 135-FZ "On protection of competition" and No. 209-FZ "On the development of small and medium-sized businesses in the Russian Federation". As a result of public discussion and subsequent criticism, the bill had to be seriously revised. As a result of public discussion and subsequent criticism, the bill had to be seriously revised.

In January 2017, a new version of the bill prepared by the Ministry of Economic Development was announced. It was proposed to extend it to small and medium-sized businesses, 30% of whose employees are disabled, single or large parents, graduates of orphanages and former prisoners, and their share in the wages fund is at least 25%. It was also proposed to consider an enterprise as social if at least 70% of its income comes from certain types of activities related to social: health care, physical education and mass sports, preschool education, social tourism, cultural and educational activities. The document was sent for approval to the Federal Antimonopoly Service, the Federal Tax Service, the Ministry of Finance and the Ministry of Labor.

In July 2017, Russian President Vladimir Putin announced the adoption of a package of laws on social entrepreneurship in the fall of the same year. According to him, the Cabinet of Ministers prepared two bills: the first defined the concept of social entrepreneurship, the second prescribed the mechanisms for its implementation. It was expected that the State Duma would adopt a federal law "On Social Entrepreneurship" in December 2017, but this did not happen again.

On December 26, 2018, at a government meeting, another version of the draft law on social entrepreneurship was approved for submission to the State Duma. Prime Minister Dmitry Medvedev named four criteria for classifying business as social:

1. A social entrepreneur should work in the provision of socially useful services, including the environment, education, cultural and educational activities. The share of the company's income from such activities must be at least 50%.
2. A social entrepreneur should hire citizens of “socially vulnerable categories”: disabled people, pensioners, people of pre-retirement age, parents with many children, graduates of orphanages and some others. There should be at least 50% of such employees.
3. Ensuring access of manufactured goods to sales markets is also the responsibility of the social enterprise.
4. A social enterprise must produce goods or services that help in life categories of citizens in need of support.

On March 5, 2019, parliamentary hearings were held on the draft law on social entrepreneurship in Russia. On the same day, the bill was adopted by the State Duma in the first reading. The second reading took place on July 9, 2019, and on July 11, the law was adopted in the final third reading. On July 23, the bill was approved by the Federation Council, and on July 26, 2019, Law No. 245-FZ "On Amendments to the Federal Law" On the Development of Small and Medium-Sized Businesses in the Russian Federation "in terms of consolidating the concepts of" social entrepreneurship "," social enterprise "" was signed by president Vladimir Putin and entered into force.

The adopted amendments implement a very conservative approach to the concept of “social entrepreneurship” and associate it with the employment of representatives of socially unprotected groups, as well as with some types of activities: educational, cultural, preservation of the languages of the peoples of Russia, with activities to strengthen families and support motherhood. However, a number of areas that are important and traditional for social entrepreneurship in Russian and world practice were not covered by the law, in particular, environmental activities, projects for the preservation and development of villages, and the revival of folk arts and crafts. The law also does not allow considering large business enterprises as social. The fundamental omission of the adopted document is the unwritten connection between "social enterprise" and "social entrepreneurship":

The bill does not require a "social enterprise" to be engaged in "social entrepreneurship" in the literal sense, it cannot only be "activities for the production and (or) sale of excisable goods, as well as for the extraction and (or) sale of minerals, with the exception of common ". That is, such can be, among other things, a gravel pit, in the staff of which mainly orphans are formally employed - attempts to appropriate regional subsidies through them are likely. - Oleg Sapozhkov and Dmitry Butrin for Kommersant

On the other hand, the law is focused not so much on subsidies as on the support of infrastructure - the SICs, and the regional authorities still have the opportunity to supplement the list of social enterprises by type of activity.

Even before the adoption of the federal law, the concept of "social entrepreneurship" was present in some regional legislation of the Russian Federation (Khanty-Mansi Autonomous Okrug, Kostroma Region). After the adoption of the federal law, the corresponding changes began to be introduced into regional legislation more actively: by November 2020, there were already 35 such regions (out of 85).

In 2021, the Russian authorities began to develop regional legislation in the field of social entrepreneurship. The pilot region for the implementation of the law on social business became Khanty-Mansi Autonomous Okrug.

At the end of 2022, it is planned to adopt amendments to Article 24-1 of the Federal Law "On the Development of Small and Medium—sized Enterprises in the Russian Federation" in order to provide the status of a social enterprise to disabled individual entrepreneurs without employees, as well as to disabled individual entrepreneurs who have employed at least one employee from among socially unprotected categories of citizens.

==== Register of social entrepreneurs ====
On January 10, 2020, the order of the Ministry of Economic Development No. 773 “On approval of the Procedure for recognizing a small or medium-sized enterprise (SME) as a social enterprise and the Procedure for forming a list of small and medium-sized businesses with the status of a social enterprise” came into force. The text of the order of the Ministry of Economic Development lists the documents required to obtain the status.

According to the order, entrepreneurs wishing to receive the status of a "social enterprise" in the "first wave" had to submit an abbreviated package of documents to the regional authorized bodies by March 1, 2020. Those, in turn, had to make a decision on granting the status before April 1, 2020. As a result of the "first wave", 1197 small and medium-sized businesses received the status, of which 60% are individual entrepreneurs and 40% are legal entities. Notably, 9 out of 10 registered enterprises are micro-enterprises. Out of 85 constituent entities of the Russian Federation, 29 did not have a single social enterprise registered.

The "second wave" of documents acceptance ended on June 15, 2020, the status seekers had to submit a full package of documents. Based on the results of consideration of the submitted applications, a register of social entrepreneurs was compiled. According to the Federal Tax Service of the Russian Federation, following the results of both "waves" of registration, social enterprises were registered in 72 constituent entities of the Russian Federation, the total number of registered social enterprises amounted to 2869, they created 15,303 jobs. At the same time, less than 20 social enterprises were registered in 22 regions of Russia, and not a single social enterprise was registered in 13 other regions. More than 100 social enterprises are registered in the Moscow region (291), the Khanty-Mansiysk Autonomous Okrug (201), the Republic of Bashkortostan (193), the city of Moscow (190) and the Tula region (161). The Ministry of Economic Development planned that by the end of 2021, 3.5 thousand social entrepreneurs would be included in the register, but in October more than 6 thousand social enterprises were added to the register.

As of August 2022, the number of registered social enterprises was 6,921. Leadership in the number of social entrepreneurs is held by Moscow Region (722), Republic of Bashkortostan (362), Nizhny Novgorod Region (324), Khanty-Mansi Autonomous Okrug and Primorsky Krai.

In 2022, the State Duma adopted in the first reading a bill allowing individual entrepreneurs with disabilities and without employees to obtain the status of a social enterprise.

Most of the social entrepreneurs included in the register provide childcare services, operate in the field of additional education, sports, health care, physical culture and recreation activities. A number of entrepreneurs are active in the fields of culture, arts and handicrafts. Some social entrepreneurs are involved in caring for the elderly, publishing and printing, sewing and repairing clothes (in particular, for the disabled), solving problems of environmental protection, producing technical means of rehabilitation, and working in the field of information technology.

Russian registered social entrepreneurs must confirm their status annually: from 2021, documents are accepted once a year, until May 1.

It is expected that the adoption of amendments to include people with disabilities in the register of social entrepreneurs will expand the register by at least 10%. Experts see another potential source of expanding the register in the transition of the self-employed with disabilities to the status of entrepreneurs.

By the end of 2022, the number of registered social entrepreneurs in Russia approached 8,000 (according to other sources, 7,000). According to experts of the Chamber of Commerce and Industry, up to 50,000 enterprises can potentially apply for this status in Russia.

== Perspectives ==
According to experts, the prospects for the development of social entrepreneurship in Russia are uncertain. The likelihood of growth in business activity and social consciousness of Russians is low. Accordingly, significant investments from Russian business in social projects are not expected. Russians as a whole do not understand and are not close to the merger of entrepreneurial and social activities; they are much more accustomed to traditional business with the subsequent allocation of part of the profits to charity (patronage) or social responsibility.

The Russian state, noticing the global trend in social business, saw it as an opportunity to shift the burden of social support to the population onto the shoulders of “private traders”. Thus, social entrepreneurship in Russia is actually equated with social work in general, "is seen as something like a business social security." This interpretation of the concept deliberately limits the range of consumers of products and services of social business to the usual clientele of social protection centers: these are the disabled, pensioners, large and single parents, orphans and graduates of orphanages.

Within this logic, there is no room for the main task of social entrepreneurship: the production of "social change" through the production of goods and services in the social sphere.

Experts conclude that the prospects for social entrepreneurship in Russia will depend on the answers to two questions:

1. will the state continue to withdraw itself from the social sphere, including healthcare and social security, transferring part of its functions to private business and socially oriented NGOs;
2. whether big business will begin to distinguish social entrepreneurship from philanthropy and social responsibility, and whether it will enter the social business sphere as a full-fledged player with investments and franchises.

The answers to these questions will appear only after the end of the global economic crisis associated with the COVID-19 pandemic and radically distorting and "obscuring" the economic picture.

== Sources ==
- Sadyrtdinov R. (2020). "Social Entrepreneurship and Corporate Social Responsibility in the Russian Federation". Social Entrepreneurship and Enterprises in Economic and Social Development. pp. 217–236. ISBN 9780197518311.
- Арай Ю. Н., Бандалюк О. В., Баркан Д. И., Благов Ю. Е., и др. (2017). Управление проектами в области социального предпринимательства. СПб: Санкт-Петербургский государственный университет. ISBN 978-5-288-05719-9.
- Бадя Л.В. (2008). Отечественный опыт преодоления бедности методами трудовой помощи (XVIII — начало XX вв.). М.: АНО СПО «СОТИС».
- Баринова В. А. (2018). Зарубежный опыт развития социального предпринимательства и возможность его применения в России. Научные труды. Институт экономической политики имени Е. Т. Гайдара. Moscow: Издательство Института Гайдара.
- Барков А. В. (2012). "Социальное предпринимательство в условиях формирования правовой модели рынка социальных услуг". Предпринимательское право (2).
- Благов Ю. Е., Арай Ю. Н. (2014). "Образовательные программы в области социального предпринимательства: мировой опыт и российские особенности". Вестник Санкт-Петербургского Университета. Менеджмент (3): 177–197.
- Бегимбетова И., Прохорова Н. (2016). "Социально озабоченные. Как предприниматели захотели приносить пользу людям". Коммерсантъ. Деньги (21 марта /11): 23.
- Боголюбова Л.Л. (2017). Социальное предпринимательство. Ханты-Мансийск: Печатный мир. ISBN 978-5-9500406-5-8.
- Гасникова В. (September 2018). "Прибыль в пользу общества". Коммерсантъ. Санкт-Петербург. "27"
- Гришина Я.С. (2013). "Социальное предпринимательство как инновационно-правовая основа обеспечения имущественных потребностей". Вестник Нижегородского Университета Им. Н. И. Лобачевского. 3 (2): 50–52.
- Гришина Я. С. (2013). Социальное предпринимательство как инновационно-правовая основа обеспечения имущественных потребностей (Вестник Нижегородского университета им. Н. И. Лобачевского ed.).
- Грищенко Ю. И. (2013). "Тенденции развития социального предпринимательства в России". Стратегии Бизнеса (2): 72–74.
- Грищенко Ю. И., Шевелева Э. С. (2016). "Источники финансирования социального предпринимательства в России". Финансовый менеджмент (3): 82–88.
- Жохова В. В. (2015). "Социальное предпринимательство: концепция, сущность и значение". Современная конкуренция. 9 (4(52)): 77–99.
- Жураковский В.Р. (2017). Правовое регулирование социального предпринимательства в Республике Беларусь и за рубежом (PDF). Minsk: МПОО «АКТ». Archived from the original (PDF) on February 27, 2018.
- Зверева Н. И. (2019). Атлас практик развития социального предпринимательства (PDF). М.: ФРСП «Наше будущее».
- Исаев А., Шамрай А., Барабанов Д., Литянская Н. (2013). Социальное предпринимательство в России (PDF). МСП Банк.
- Кадол Н. Ф., Календжян С. О. (2022). Аганбегян А. Г. (ed.). Социальное предпринимательство (2nd ed.). М.: Дело. p. 237. ISBN 978-5-85006-458-7.
- Казакова-Апкаримова Е.Ю. (2010). "Исторический опыт социального предпринимательства на Урале". Известия Уральского государственного экономического университета. 6 (32): 130–134.
- Козлова О.А., Копылова Ю.В., Тагирова А.В. (2018). Социальное предпринимательство: потенциал развития инновационной активности в ХМАО-Югра. Ставрополь: Логос. ISBN 978-5-907078-47-5.
- Лескова Ю. Г. (2013). "Саморегулируемая организация как правовая модель внедрения и развития социального предпринимательства". Юрист (11): 13–17.
- Московская А.А. (2011). Социальное предпринимательство в России и в мире (PDF). М.: Издательский дом Высшей школы экономики. ISBN 978-5-7598-0883-1.
- Мухин А. В. (2011). "Эволюция понятия социального предпринимательства, основные функции социального предпринимательства". Новые Технологии (2). Краснодар: 103–106.
- Нестеренко Ю. Н.; Плюхина А. А. (2017). Развитие социального предпринимательства в экономике России. М.: Креативная экономика. ISBN 978-5-91292-169-8.
- Пономарёв И. (2016-06-29). "Социальное предпринимательство в России состоялось". ТПП-Информ.
- Пономарёв С. В. (2016). "Инфраструктура поддержки социального предпринимательства в России". Российские и американские практики поддержки социального предпринимательства. ПолинаПресс: 6–16.
- Починок Н. Б. (2017). Социальное предпринимательство: от экономики накопления к экономике позитивных преобразований (PDF). Избранные лекции Университета. Vol. 178. СПб: Saint Petersburg Humanitarian University of Trade Unions. ISBN 978-5-7621-0866-9. Archived from the original (PDF) on April 2, 2018.
- Романова С. (2015-06-25). "В России начался бум социального предпринимательства". Ведомости.
- Сафаров С.М. (2014). Основы социального предпринимательства. Иваново: Роща. ISBN 978-5-990429-75-8.
- Сидоров Н. И. (2015). Социальное предпринимательство и предпринимательство в социальной сфере (теория и практика). М.: Издательский дом State University of Management. ISBN 978-5-215-02767-7.
- Ситников А. П. (2009). Социальное и политическое предпринимательство: современные формы соединения хозяйственной и общественной деятельности. М.: ИМАДЖ-Контакт. ISBN 978-5-94369-022-8.
- Юрина Е. А. (2011). "Тенденции развития предпринимательства в России. Социальный аспект". Социально-экономические явления и процессы. 11 (33): 257–260.

== See also ==
- Our Future (fund)
