= Our Future (fund) =

Russian nonprofit organization

- Formation: 2007
- Founder: Vagit Alekperov
- Location: Moscow, Russia
- Key people: Natalia Zvereva
- Website: https://nb-fund.ru/en/

The Our Future Foundation for Regional Social Programs (Russian: Фонд региональных социальных программ «Наше будущее») is a non-profit organization that declares its goal to develop social entrepreneurship in Russia. The fund was founded in 2007 by the president and co-owner of the oil company "Lukoil" Vagit Alekperov. The headquarters is located in Moscow. The director of the fund is Natalia Zvereva.

As of November 2019, the fund, according to its own data, supported 254 social entrepreneurship projects located in 58 regions of Russia, 653.2 million rubles were allocated for their implementation in the form of interest-free loans. Among the main infrastructure projects of the fund: the all-Russian competition "Social Entrepreneur", the Laboratory of Social Entrepreneurship, the "More than a Purchase!" program, the "Impulse of Kindness" award. In addition to financial and organizational assistance, the foundation provides social entrepreneurs with legal, consulting and information support.

Our Future Foundation is a member of the Asian Venture Philanthropy Network (AVPN). In 2020, the fund took 3rd place in the Forbes ranking among the best charitable foundations of the richest Russians.

According to Vagit Alekperov, he bequeathed his shares of Lukoil to the Our Future Foundation.

== Foundation ==
The fund was created in 2007 on the initiative of the Russian businessman Vagit Alekperov. Не invited Natalia Zvereva to be the director of the fund. The declared goals are the implementation of long-term socially significant programs and projects based on the principles of social entrepreneurship. According to RBC, the Our Future Foundation became one of the first private foundations in Russia that help disabled people, large families, orphans, and those who are often unclaimed in civilian life.

== Activities ==
=== Contests ===
Since 2008, the Fund has been holding the "Social Entrepreneur" all-Russian competition, during which the social projects are selected for providing targeted financial assistance. The first social entrepreneurship project received the support from the fund was the Dospehi company, which produces orthopedic systems for people with spinal cord injuries - they were allocated 9.5 million rubles in support (4 million were transferred free of charge, 5.5 million were given in the form of interest-free loan for working capital for a period of two years).

As of 2020, the competition has been running for 12 years, 254 projects from 58 regions of Russia have won interest-free cash loans for a total amount of 653.2 million rubles. Since 2018, the minimum amount of a loan has been increased from 500 thousand to 2 million rubles, and entrepreneurs participating in the competition were able to apply for loans up to 10 million rubles, on a par with the winners of previous years. At the same time, the maximum loan maturity increased from 7 to 10 years. Also in 2018, the fund announced the allocation of interest-free loans to socially transformative projects in the amount of 10 to 40 million rubles with a grace period of up to 3 years within the framework of a competition. In 2021, the Fund announced the transformation of the "Social Entrepreneur" competition in response to the proposals of the Ministry of Economic Development to provide support to social entrepreneurs, including through the provision of soft loans through the state system of microfinance centers. The stated goal of the transformation of the competition is to provide assistance to a number of regions in greatest need. As a result, the competition was divided into two: a competition for social impact projects, the winners of which are granted interest-free loans in the amount of 10 to 40 million rubles (30% of the total budget of the competition) for the purchase of real estate and equipment for up to 10 years, and a competition for social and entrepreneurial projects, following which interest-free loans are issued for the implementation of projects in the amount of 3 to 7 million rubles for a period of up to 5 years.

The foundation also supports social entrepreneurs to develop and market their social business franchises. Currently, support in the development of the franchise has been received by the Stupenki network of full-time recreational kindergartens, Observer wheelchair repair shops, Chudeevo art centers for children and adults, Opeka geriatric centers network, 24-hour social assistance service disabled and elderly people System of Care.

Since 2015, the Our Future Foundation and MSP Bank have supported the All-Russian competition of projects in the field of social entrepreneurship "The Best Social Project of the Year", organized by the Russian State Social University in conjunction with the Ministry of Economic Development of the Russian Federation.

In September–October 2022, the foundation held a competition for the development of the "social entrepreneur" distinction mark, similar to the Russian State quality mark.

=== Impulse of Kindness Award ===
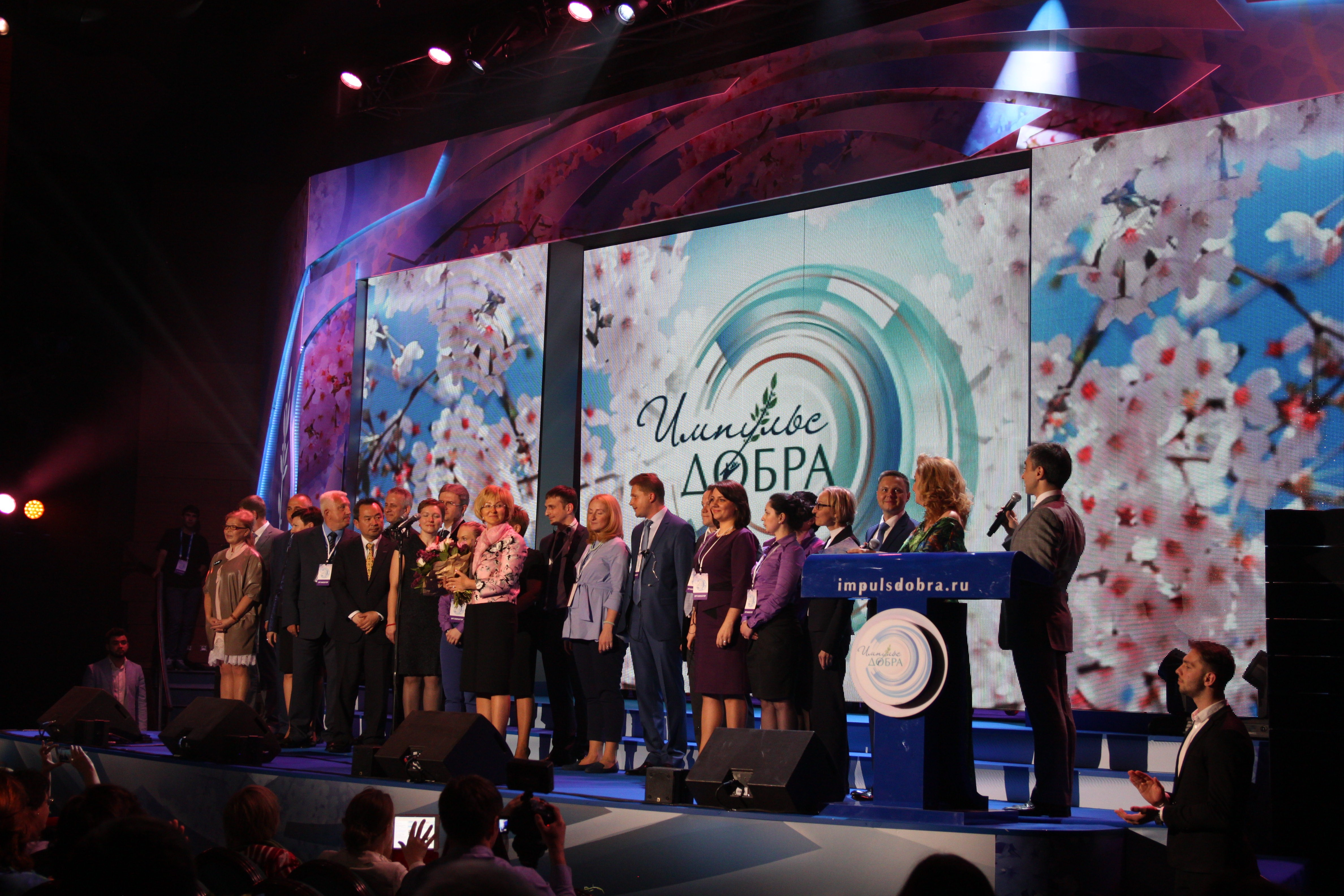
"Impulse of Kindness - 2015" award ceremony

Every year, the Foundation awards the Impulse of Kindness prize for contributions to the development and promotion of social entrepreneurship in Russia. The award was established in 2011 with the aim of encouraging the best domestic social entrepreneurs and attracting government attention to the development of social entrepreneurship in Russia.

The first awarding took place in 2012. The prize is awarded in six main categories:

1. For personal contribution to the development of social entrepreneurship (awarded to an individual)
2. For a systematic approach to social entrepreneurship (individual or legal entity)
3. For the best corporate program for the development of social entrepreneurship (legal entity)
4. For the best regional program to support social entrepreneurship (constituent entity of the Russian Federation) - nomination established by the Ministry of Economic Development of Russia
5. For the best media coverage of social entrepreneurship (awarded to a medium)
6. For the best Russian educational program in the field of social entrepreneurship (educational institution)
7. In 2015, the special nomination "For personal contribution to the development of social entrepreneurship in the field of culture" was introduced. The winners were the actors: Evgeny Mironov (2015), Konstantin Khabensky (2016), Egor Beroev and Ksenia Alfyorova (2017), Sergei Bezrukov (2018). In 2019, the nomination was not awarded.

In 2018, the prize was also awarded in the nomination "For the best project of social entrepreneurship in the digital economy" (for an individual or legal entity). At the 7th "Impulse of Kindness" award ceremony on October 4, 2018, an agreement was signed between the Our Future Foundation and the Social Projects Support Fund. In the same year, the Impulse of Kindness prize won first place at the Eventiada IPRA GWA ceremony in the category "Best Project in the Field of Corporate Social Responsibility".

In 2019, the award was presented in a new category "Best startup in a field of social entrepreneurship", as well as in the special category "For the first issue of green bonds in Russia". With the adoption of the law on social entrepreneurship in Russia, the organizers of the award recorded an increase in the number of applications for its receipt: 332 against 230 a year earlier.

Guests of the ceremony have the opportunity to visit the traditional exhibition of innovative projects of social entrepreneurs. In connection with the COVID-19 pandemic, it was decided not to hold the Impulse of Kindness awards ceremony in 2020. For the same reasons, the next award presentation took place in an online format, on October 27, 2021. More than 200 applications were submitted for the award. According to the fund's own data, 436 applications were submitted in 2022 — more than ever before, the prize fund was increased by 30%, to 4.2 million rubles. The award ceremony took place at the end of May 2022, in violation of the established tradition of autumn awarding.

Since the award was established, 109 laureates from more than 20 regions of Russia have been awarded it.

According to the Doctor of Sciences in Economics V. Y. Kulkova, the nomination "For the best regional program to support social entrepreneurship" of the Impulse of Kindness Award can be used for official recognition of progressive regional practices in the field of social entrepreneurship development in Russia.

=== Anti-crisis support ===
The funds saved due to the cancellation of the "Impulse of Kindness" award ceremony in 2020 were directed by the Foundation to targeted support of 40 social enterprises most affected by the consequences of the pandemic, from among those that have already been supported. Support is provided in the form of grants or product buyouts, which are then channeled to charity. A total of 11.7 million rubles were allocated for these purposes.

The Fund also announced a 6-month deferral for the return of previously issued loans for bona fide borrowers whose activities were suspended as a result of the pandemic.

=== "More than a Purchase!" ===
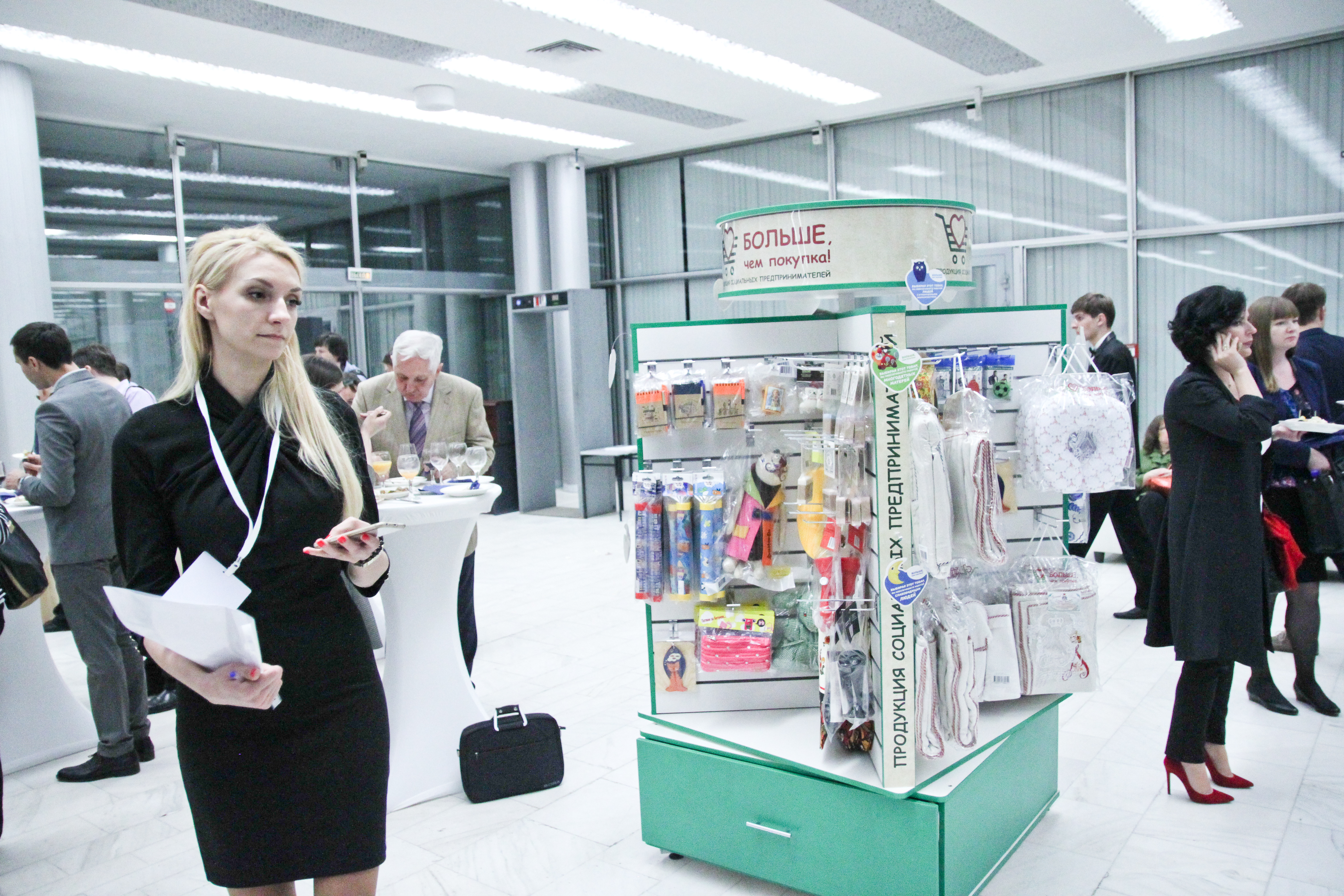
The "More than a Purchase!" stand at the "Impulse of Kindness" award ceremony, 2016

To promote the goods of Russian social entrepreneurs in 2014, the Our Future Foundation, together with Lukoil, launched "More than a Purchase!" project.

The project was launched in the form of a competition, the winners will be able to sell their products in the stores of the Lukoil filling station network in most of the regions of Russia.

In the stores of the first two gas stations, immediately after the start of the program in January 2014, one could buy felt boots (which were in the greatest demand), felt bags, transforming pillows, tablecloths, towels, farm dairy products, souvenirs and other products produced by social entreprises. All sold goods have a special marking. The assortment changes depending on demand.

By the end of 2014, the experiment was recognized as successful, and the number of gas stations with stands with products of social entrepreneurs in their sales areas increased to 42 (in Russia as a whole).

By the end of 2016, according to the Fund itself, 134 gas stations in 14 regions of Russia were connected to the project "More than a purchase!" It is planned to expand this practice and connect more than 3000 filling stations throughout the country to the project.

In May 2017, the "More than a purchase!" project was awarded the All-Russian Prize "Good Deed", established by the public organization of entrepreneurs "Business Russia", in the special category "For support of social entrepreneurs".

As of 2019, the products of the "More than a Purchase!" brand are sold at 1,550 points of sale in 55 regions of Russia, 55 suppliers are employed in the project and 250 items of goods are presented.

In 2020, in order to create an infrastructure for the market for the sale of social entrepreneurs' products via the Internet, the Our Future Foundation signed an agreement with the Fair of Masters Internet platform, the largest platform for handmade products of small businesses, individual entrepreneurs and the self-employed population.

During the COVID-19 pandemic, the project launched the production of disposable medical masks and gloves.

In 2021, according to the fund's own data, about 2 thousand retail outlets were already operating within the framework of the project. During the year, goods worth more than 150 million rubles were sold, 35 manufacturers from among social entrepreneurs were supported, including 8 enterprises of the All-Russian Society of the Blind.

In 2022, the program "More than a purchase!" was recognized as the best in the category "Social Entrepreneurship" at the forum "The Best social projects in Russia".

At the beginning of 2023, the products of the "More than a Purchase!" project, in addition to filling stations, are sold in Russian hypermarkets of the O’Key and Selgros networks, as well as on the Wildberries Internet platform.

=== Social Entrepreneurship Laboratory ===
The Social Entrepreneurship Laboratory was created by the Our Future Foundation in 2014 with the aim of creating new tools for supporting and developing social business in Russia; since June 2014, it has been conducting educational activities. The stated mission of the Laboratory is to assist in the creation and development of social business. The laboratory conducts free and paid training for beginners and already existing social entrepreneurs. Videos of free online courses and seminars are posted on the YouTube channel.

According to its own data, the coverage of educational courses and webinars of the Laboratory of Social Entrepreneurship is 130,000 people. Since 2014, 150 webinars, 26 face-to-face events and 15 thematic courses have been held, 100 trainers have been involved.

In 2017, the Social Entrepreneurship Laboratory won in the category "Best project in the field of corporate communications" and took 3rd place in the category "Best public project" of the international competition of communication projects Eventiada IPRA GWA 2017.

=== Cooperation with Russian regions ===
In 2012, the Foundation provided assistance to the developing interest in social entrepreneurship in the Vologda Oblast; with its assistance, 10 social projects of the Vologda Oblast received grants for development.

In February 2012, the Fund, together with the Ministry of Economy and Trade of Kalmykia, held a competition for social entrepreneurship projects "Fair of Social Ideas" in the republic, the winners were given the opportunity to participate in the second round of the "Social Entrepreneur-2012" competition.

The Foundation regularly holds all-Russian and regional meetings of social entrepreneurs. The first all-Russian meeting took place on 25 April 2012.

In 2014, the fund supported social entrepreneurship in the Volgograd Oblast by signing a trilateral agreement between the Our Future Foundation, the Ministry of Economy, Foreign Economic Activity and Investments of the Volgograd Oblast and the Center for Consulting and Outsourcing "Our Future" to support social entrepreneurship in this region.

On 19 March 2015, it became known that the Fund, together with the International Forum of Business Leaders, signed an agreement aimed at promoting mentoring in social entrepreneurship with a view to its development. The purpose of the agreement is the organization and subsequent implementation of various joint activities. Other goals of the agreement are the exchange of experience and the promotion of partner initiatives. To begin with, it is planned to use the results of the agreement in a joint project in the Perm Krai, then it is planned to expand cooperation in other regions.

In the fall of 2016, a pilot project for the development of social investment in Ugra was launched. The project became part of a comprehensive model for the development of social entrepreneurship in Ugra, which included a set of regulatory and other documents, tools and mechanisms to ensure the development and support of social projects, interaction of the business community with government authorities. As a result, 30 investors were found who expressed their readiness to finance 8 regional projects in the field of social entrepreneurship for a total amount of 115.6 million rubles. The project developers plan to extend it to other constituent entities of the Russian Federation in 2019.

Our Future Foundation is a partner of the Forum of Social Innovations of the Regions. The second forum took place in Krasnogorsk on 8–9 June 2017.

Also in Krasnogorsk, in the House of Moscow Oblast Government, on 16 May 2018, the largest all-Russian gathering of social entrepreneurs, focused on social entrepreneurs - manufacturers of goods, was held, and representatives of retail were invited there for the first time.

On 18 April 2019, the fund signed a cooperation agreement with the government of the Yamalo-Nenets Autonomous Okrug. In September 2021, a similar agreement was signed with the Department of Entrepreneurship and Innovative Development of Moscow.

In March 2022, another agreement was signed with the Krasnoyarsk Regional Business Development Center "My Business".

In July 2022, it became known about the participation of the Fund's experts in testing and subsequent revision of the Federal Law of July 13, 2020 No. 189 "On the state (municipal) social order for the provision of state (municipal) services in the social sphere.".

The Foundation supports regional Associations of Social Entrepreneurship. As of August 2022, agreements have been signed with the ASE of St. Petersburg, the Krasnoyarsk and Krasnodar Krais, the Amur and Astrakhan Regions, and the Republic of Bashkortostan.

=== Cooperation with major business and government agencies ===
In July 2013, the Fund signed an agreement to support social entrepreneurship in cooperation with the Support of Russia organization and Uralsib Bank.

In May 2015, the Fund, together with the Nornickel company, took part in the finalization of 15 business projects, the purpose of which is to eliminate the social problems of the inhabitants of the Arctic.

At the end of 2017, the results of the first grant competition "Act Without Borders" were summed up - a joint project of the Baltika Breweries, which initiated a comprehensive program to support the disabled, and the Our Future Foundation, which was the organizer of the competition. Among budding social entrepreneurs, 9 projects from 6 regions of Russia received financial support for a total amount of over 3.4 million rubles. Among existing entrepreneurs, 7 projects from 7 regions of Russia received financial support for a total amount of over 2.7 million rubles. In addition to grant support, the program runs a thematic Online School of Social Entrepreneurship to train aspiring entrepreneurs to create and develop social businesses aimed at supporting people with disabilities.

In April 2019, the Our Future Foundation and the largest Russian petrochemical company Sibur launched a joint comprehensive program to support and develop social entrepreneurship in Tobolsk and the Tobolsky District. The program was held in the form of a grant competition among social entrepreneurs of the region and continued until the end of 2019. In 2021, the Our Future Foundation and Sibur launched a new cooperation program, named "The Growth Formula".

In July 2019, the Our Future Foundation and the Corporation for the Development of Small and Medium-Sized Entrepreneurship (SME Corporation) entered into a partnership agreement, the subject of which was the opportunity for social entrepreneurs to obtain a loan guarantee from the SME Corporation. The guarantee is considered by the Fund as additional security for the loan.

=== Educational and consulting activities ===
The Our Future Foundation has concluded more than 20 agreements on the support of social entrepreneurship with higher educational institutions of Russia. Among them:

№	region	city	institution	year
1	Saint Petersburg	Saint Petersburg	Saint Petersburg State University Graduate School of Management	2010
2	Moscow	Moscow	Russian State Social University	2014
3	Nizhny Novgorod Oblast	Nizhny Novgorod	N. I. Lobachevsky State University of Nizhny Novgorod	2014
4	Republic of Tatarstan	Kazan	Kazan Federal University	2015
5	Krasnoyarsk Krai	Krasnoyarsk	Siberian Federal University	2015
6	Arkhangelsk Oblast	Arkhangelsk	Northern (Arctic) Federal University	2015
7	Stavropol Krai	Stavropol	North-Caucasus Federal University	2015
8	Belgorod Oblast	Belgorod	Belgorod State University	2015
9	Novosibirsk Oblast	Novosibirsk	Novosibirsk State University of Economics and Management	2015
10	Sverdlovsk Oblast	Ekaterinburg	Ural Federal University	2015
11	Rostov Oblast	Rostov-on-Don	North Caucasus Institute (branch of RANEPA)	2015
12	Komi Republic	Syktyvkar	Komi Republican Academy of Public Service and Management	2016
13	Moscow	Moscow	Plekhanov Russian University of Economics	2016
14	Moscow	Moscow	Institute for Social Design, Plekhanov Russian University of Economics	2016
15	Rostov Oblast	Rostov-on-Don	Southern Federal University	2016
16	Perm Krai	Perm	Perm State National Research University (Higher School of Economics)	2017
17	Irkutsk Oblast	Irkutsk	Irkutsk State University	2017
18	Kirov Oblast	Kirov	Vyatka State University	2018
19	Republic of Kalmykia	Elista	Kalmyk State University	2018
20	Krasnodar Krai	Sochi	Sochi State University	2018
21	Volgograd Oblast	Volgograd	Volgograd State University	2019
22	Astrakhan Oblast	Astrakhan	Astrakhan State University	2020

Experimental courses on social entrepreneurship are taught in universities, and educational programs developed with the participation of the Foundation are being introduced. It is assumed that these programs will be included in the educational standard for teaching social entrepreneurship on the basis of higher education.

In May 2018, the Our Future Foundation and the Russian Knowledge Society signed an agreement on "disseminating knowledge in the field of social entrepreneurship".

In 2020, the Foundation signed an agreement with the Agency for Network Innovations, an experimental network platform for additional, pre-professional and professional education for schoolchildren, organized by the Russian Academy of Education and the Federal Institute for Education Development of RANEPA.

The Foundation provides comprehensive consulting support to social entrepreneurs, the range of which has expanded after the adoption of the law on social entrepreneurship in Russia. Since December 2019, an online assistant has been operating on the Foundation's website for entering the register of social entrepreneurs. The Foundation distributes brochures on this issue, and since April 2020 has been conducting telephone consultations.

During the COVID-19 pandemic in Russia, the foundation held a two-week online training marathon for social entrepreneurs "How to transfer business online".

In September 2022, a free online course on social entrepreneurship was published on the Stepik educational platform. The course was developed by experts of the Our Future Foundation and RANEPA. Soon it became known about the signing of an agreement between the Our Future Foundation and the National Accreditation Council for Business and Management Education (NASDOBR) on the joint development of educational and professional standards in the field of social entrepreneurship and socially transformative projects.

=== The international cooperation ===
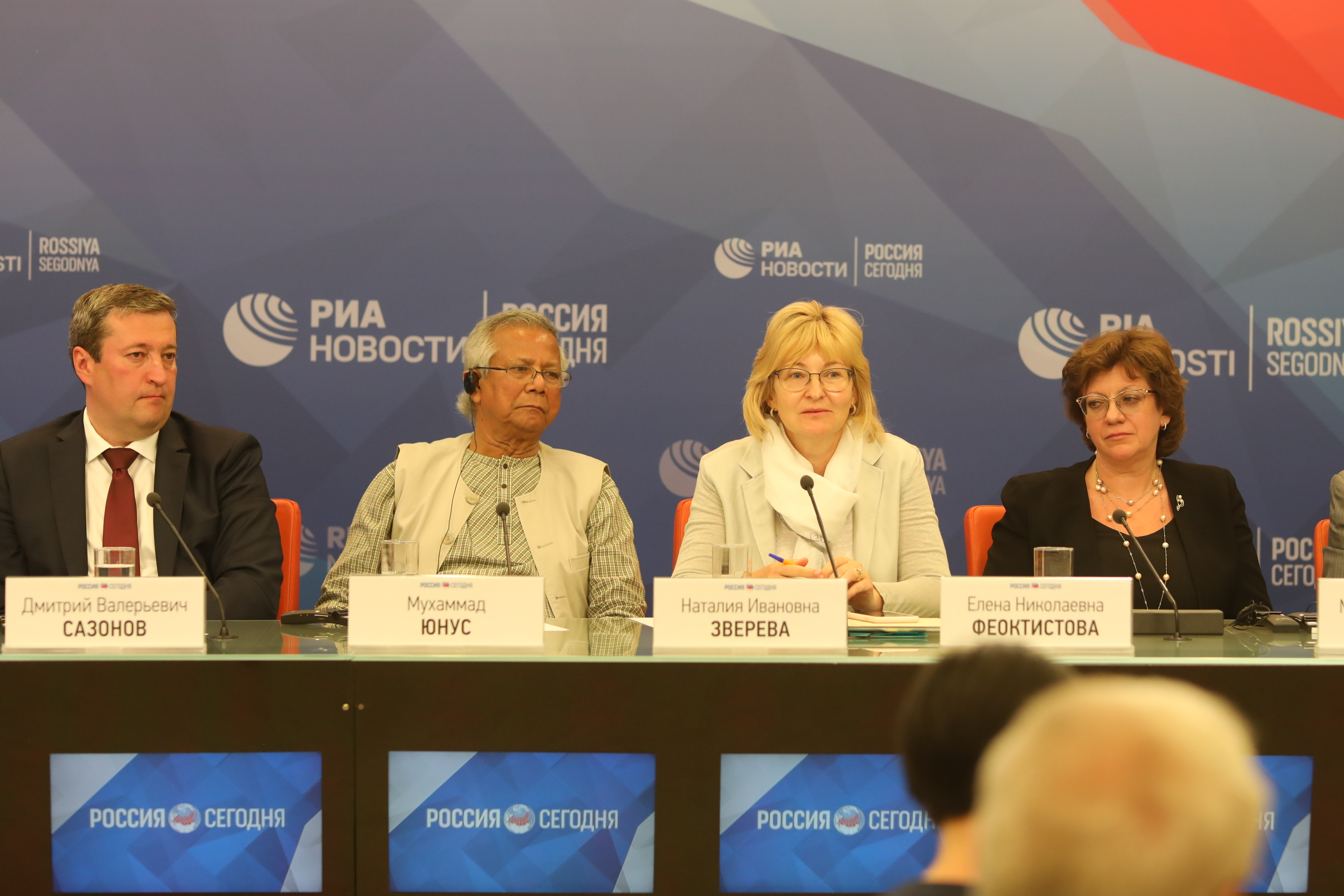
Press conference organized by the Our Future Foundation, with the participation of Grameen Bank founder and Nobel Prize laureate Muhammad Yunus, 2 July 2019

In April 2016, the Our Future Foundation and the Republican Confederation of Entrepreneurship (Republic of Belarus) signed a memorandum of cooperation. A similar memorandum was signed in May 2016 with the Eurasia Foundation of Central Asia (EFCA), which is a leader in promoting social entrepreneurship in Kazakhstan.

Outside the post-Soviet space, the Foundation cooperates with organizations and experts from Great Britain, Italy, South Korea, United States, Germany, China, Singapore. In October 2013, the Foundation held the first international conference "Social Innovations" in Moscow. In October 2017, the second international conference "Social Innovation: Defining the Future" was held. The closest contacts have developed between the Foundation and the Center for the Management of Social Enterprises of South Korea.

In the summer of 2019, the Foundation organized a visit to Moscow for the Nobel Peace Prize laureate, social entrepreneur Muhammad Yunus. Within the framework of the visit, a press conference was held summing up the results of the International Social Business Day and the presentation of Yunus's book "The World of Three Zeros".

=== Internet projects ===
The Foundation has created and maintains two thematic portals: "New Business: Social Entrepreneurship" (nb-forum.ru), covering the activities of social enterprises and entrepreneurs in Russia and in the world, as well as the portal "Bank of Social Ideas" (social-idea.ru) containing information about the ideas of social enterprises - already implemented or ready for implementation.

=== Research and publishing ===
In November 2014, the "Social Entrepreneurship of Russia" catalog was presented, the creation of which was supported by the Foundation. On 3 March 2015, the electronic version of the catalog was made available for free download. In January 2016, the second, expanded edition of the catalog, compiled at the end of 2015, was published. The third edition of the catalog, published in March 2017, includes 436 social enterprises operating in Russia.

The Foundation actively cooperates with the publishing house Alpina. Over the years, with the support of the Foundation, translations of popular books on social entrepreneurship by David Bornstein, Craig Darden-Phillips, Gill Kikal and Thomas Lyons, Lester Salamon have been published. In 2015, the textbook "Creating a Successful Social Enterprise" by Natalia Zvereva was published. In 2016, with the support of the Foundation, a book on social entrepreneurship in South Korea was published, as well as a brochure by the Foundation's expert Sergei Ponomarev "Russian and American Practices for Supporting Social Entrepreneurship".

In 2017, the Our Future Foundation began cooperation with the Political Encyclopedia Publishing House (ROSSPEN). The first joint project was the book "Social Transforming Investments. How We Change the World and Make Money", by Anthony Bugg-Levin and Jed Emerson, leading experts in social performance investment.

In the same year, the publishing house Mann, Ivanov and Ferber published the book Dolphins of Capitalism - a joint project of the Our Future Foundation and the laboratory "Once" by Dmitry Sokolov-Mitrich. The book includes "10 stories of people who did everything wrong and succeeded." Among her heroes: Roman Aranin (Observer), Alexey Mavrin (Guardianship), Natalya Nikitina ("Pastila from Kolomna" museum and "City-Museum" in Kolomna), Alexander Meshchankin (center of youth tourism "Wolverine") and others. In 2020, the project was continued - the book Dolphins of Capitalism 2.0 included the stories of 8 more successful startups, including "VkusVill", "Life Button" and "Motorika".

In the summer of 2018, with the support of the Foundation, Eksmo published a book by Roger Martin and Sally R. Osberg, Going beyond the Best: How Social Entrepreneurship Works. The preface to the Russian edition was written by Natalia Zvereva, director of the Our Future Foundation.

At the end of 2019, the Fund, with the support of the Ministry of Economic Development of Russia, published the book Atlas of Practices for the Development of Social Entrepreneurship by the Constituent Entities of the Russian Federation, authored by N. I. Zvereva. A printed version of the book is planned for 2020.

In 2020, the Our Future Foundation, together with the Higher School of Economics, conducted and published a study "World experience in the development of impact investments". The study, which lasted 11 months, analyzed and summarized the experience of 17 countries in the field of social entrepreneurship and impact investment.

In the fall of 2020, with the support of the fund, the Eksmo publishing house published a book by an expert in the field of impact investments Morgan Simon "Real Impact. How investments help build a better world."

In 2021, the Foundation became a partner of the first literary award "Heroes of social change. Modern literature on charity and social entrepreneurship" of the Forbes Russia magazine. On March 1, 2022, the winners were awarded the I—III degree prize.

At the beginning of 2023, the foundation published a collection of methodological materials “Production and placement of social advertising by social enterprises”. The manual was developed by experts from the Gladway Foundation for the Development of Media Projects and Social Programs on behalf of the Our Future Foundation.

== Ratings ==
In 2020, Our Future Foundation took 3rd place in the Forbes ranking of the 20 Best Charity Foundations of the Wealthiest Russians. A year earlier, the fund was in the same rating at the 8th position. In 2021, Forbes published the rating for the third time, and the Our Future Foundation took the 6th line in it, gaining 63.8 points out of 100 possible. The founder of the foundation, Vagit Alekperov, was awarded the "Philanthropist of the Year" prize for supporting social entrepreneurship. In 2022, the Our Future Foundation again took 6th place in the Forbes rating, while the criteria for expert assessments were revised, the fund received the highest ratings in the indicators "strategy and systematic approach of the organization" and "openness of information about activities".

In 2021, Our Future Foundation was awarded the EVPA Data Transparency Label 2021 (European Venture Philanthropy Association) “for active participation in research”.

In March 2022, as part of the charitable program to support medical workers and volunteers "Union. Assistance" the Our Future Foundation was awarded a diploma "for contribution to solving social problems caused by the coronavirus pandemic".

In July 2022, the foundation received a diploma from the Donors Forum (association of the largest grant-giving organizations in Russia) for the formation of the ecosystem of social entrepreneurship.

In December 2022, the Foundation was awarded the "Positive Changes 2022" award from the "Factory of Positive Changes" in the nomination "Development of the practice of implementing the evaluation of social projects" with the wording "For the systematization of methods and programs in the field of assessing the socio-economic efficiency of social enterprises and impact-investors".
