= Natalia Zvereva (economist) =

Russian economist

Natalia Ivanovna Zvereva
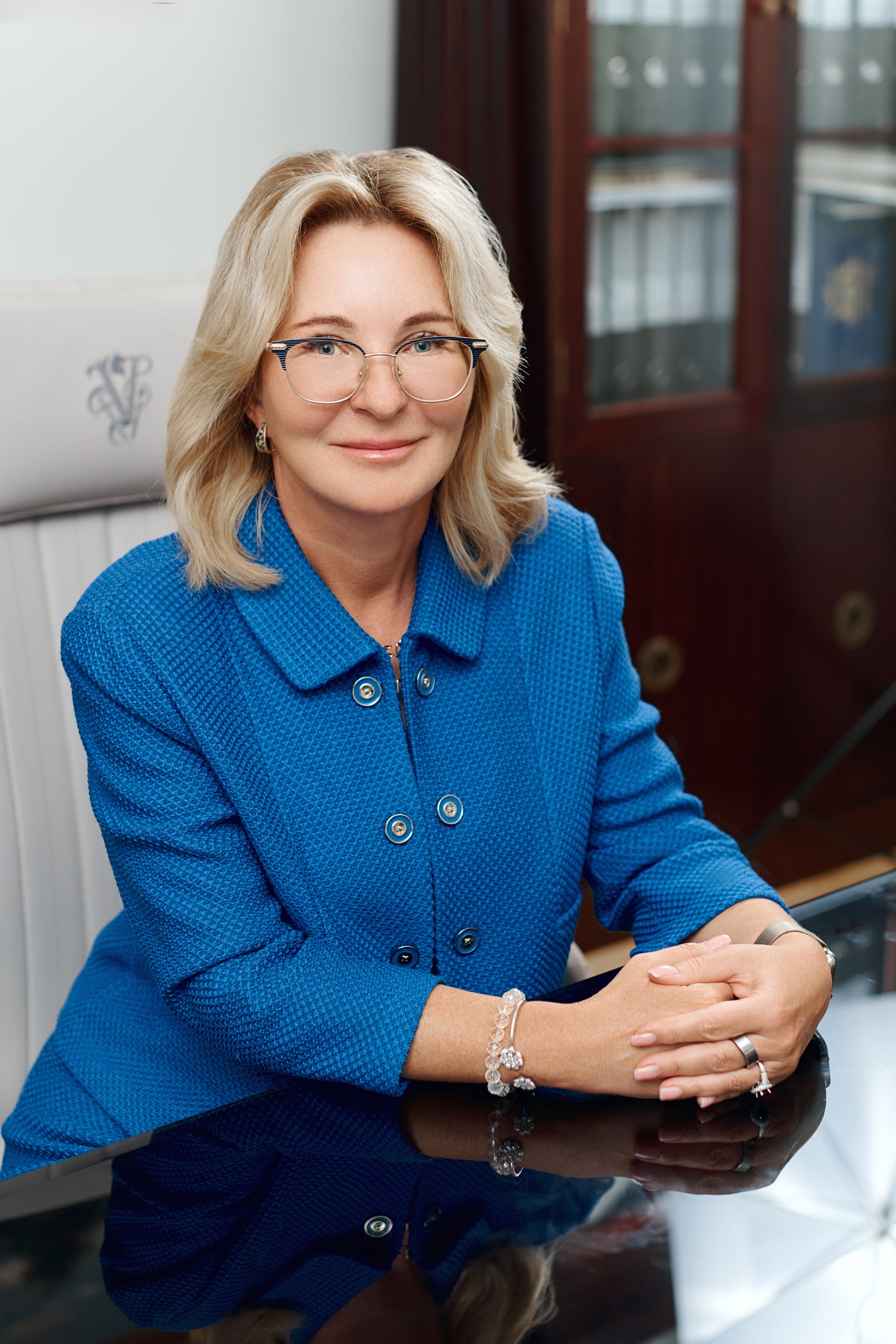
- Born: June 12, 1970; Moscow, USSR
- Occupation: Economist, manager, public figure
- Website: nb-fund.ru

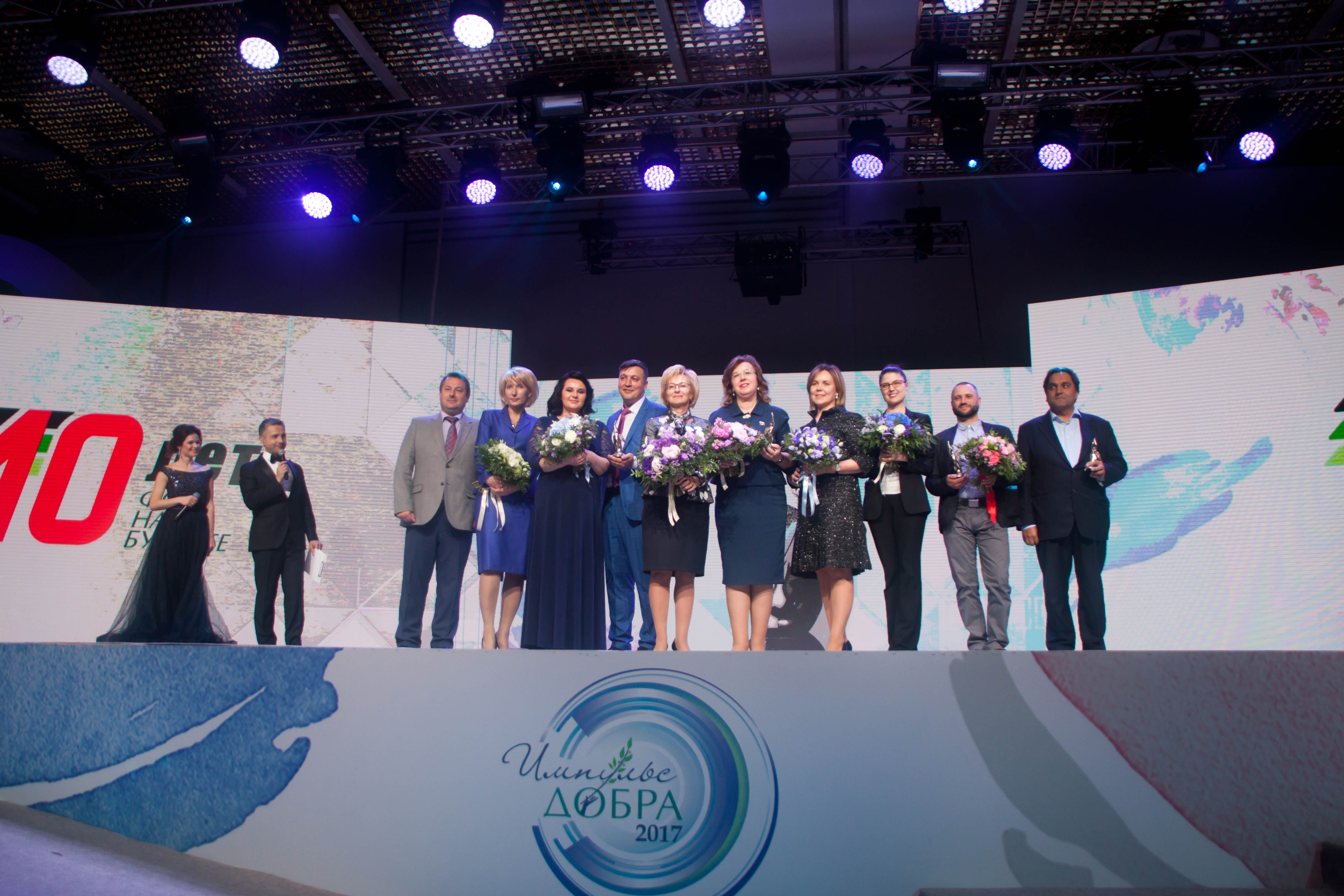
Natalia Zvereva (center) at the "Impulse of Kindness-2017" award ceremony

Natalia Ivanovna Zvereva (Russian: Наталия Ивановна Зверева; born 12 June 1950) is a Russian economist, manager and public figure. She is an expert in the field of social entrepreneurship, director of the Our Future Foundation. Candidate of Sciences in Economics (2021).

== Biography ==
In 1992 she graduated from the Moscow Institute of Applied Biotechnology with a degree in economics, studied at the Plekhanov Russian University of Economics. From 1993 to 1996, she worked at the open joint-stock company NIKoil as chief accountant, and later was director of the Department of Economics and Finance. From 2005 to 2007, she was an advisor to the chairman of the Management Board and Head of the Investment Risk Management Advisors Service at Uralsib Bank.

In 2007, she headed the fund for regional social programs Our Future founded by businessman Vagit Alekperov, which became one of the first private foundations in Russia to help people with disabilities, large families, and orphanages start their own businesses.

As an expert on social entrepreneurship for 2018, she takes part in the work of specialized organizations and events:

- Member of the Council for the Development of Social Innovations of the Subjects of the Russian Federation under the Federation Council of the Federal Assembly of the Russian Federation (since July 2015).
- Member of the Expert Council of the ANO Agency for Strategic Initiatives to Promote New Projects.
- Member of the working group on the development of the roadmap "Support for the access of non-governmental organizations to the provision of services in the social sphere".
- Speaker of the Sochi International Investment Forum and the St. Petersburg International Economic Forum in the framework of discussions on social entrepreneurship (since 2013).
- Member of the Board of Trustees of the independent national award in the field of business journalism "Media-Capital".
- Member of the Expert Council of the Agency for Strategic Initiatives (ASI).

In October 2013, she took part in a meeting of entrepreneurs with the Cabinet of Ministers and Dmitry Medvedev.

In 2015, the Alpina Publisher published the tutorial Creating a Successful Social Enterprise by Natalia Zvereva.

Zvereva's articles were published in the magazines Expert, Forbes, newspapers Vedomosti, Chastny Korrespondent and others.

On March 5, 2019, Natalia Zvereva took part in the parliamentary hearings of the draft law on social entrepreneurship in Russia. On the same day, the bill was adopted by the State Duma in the first reading (entered into force in July 2019).

At the end of 2019, the Our Future Foundation, with the support of the Ministry of Economic Development, published the book Atlas of Practices for the Development of Social Entrepreneurship by the Constituent Entities of the Russian Federation, authored by Natalia Zvereva. In 2020, it is planned to publish a printed version of the book.

On November 25, 2020, Natalia Zvereva took part in a meeting of the Council for the Development of Social Innovations of the Subjects of the Russian Federation under the Federation Council. As part of her report, she made a number of proposals for the further development of the infrastructure of state support for social entrepreneurship in Russia.

In 2021, she defended her dissertation for the degree of Candidate of Sciences in Economics on the topic "Model of creation and organizational and economic mechanism of functioning of institutions for the development of social entrepreneurship" (scientific supervisor: Doctor of Sciences in Economics S. G. Falco).

In 2022 Natalia Zvereva joined the Board of Trustees of the State Museum of Oriental Art.

== Honours ==
- National Prize "Great People of Great Russia" (2016).
- Diploma of the Chamber of Commerce and Industry of the Russian Federation for contribution to the development of social entrepreneurship.
- Medal of the Holy Blessed Prince Daniel of Moscow "For Labor for the Glory of the Holy Church" (2008).
