= Konstantin Vaysman =

Konstantin M. Vaysman (Ukrainian: Костянтин Михайлович Вайсман) is a Ukrainian banker. In October 2013 he was appointed chairman of the board of PJSC VTB Bank (Ukraine). Vaysman specializes in business strategy, finance, account management, controlling, strategic planning, marketing and mergers and acquisition.

== Early life ==
Vaysman was born 14 October 1969. He graduated from State University of Management, Moscow with a master's degree in Automated Control Systems. He first worked at Institute of Enterprise Management in Caen in 1991–1992. He earned an MBA in High Business School at the University of Chicago (London).

== Career ==
Vaysman's Career
Firm	Position	Date
JSB Toribank	Head of Financial Analysis Division and deputy chair of the Board	1993 to 1996
Credit Bank of Moscow.	(Unknown)	1996 to 2003
JSB Rosevrobank	Board Chair	August 2003 to May 2007
URALSIB Financial Corporation	First Vice-president, Strategy and Finance and Head of Strategy and M&A	May 2007 to October 2009
First Ukrainian International Bank.	Board Chair	22 January 2010 to October 2012
PJSC VTB Bank	Board Chair	October 2013 to Present

== Awards ==
- Banker of the Year – 2011 awarded by ІІ International Contest "The Best Banks GUAM – 2011"
