= Sojusekspertisa =

Russia's largest accredited certification organization

ANO "Soyuzexpertiza"
- Company type: ANO (Autonomous Nonprofit Organization)
- Founded: April 3, 1923
- Headquarters: Moscow, Russia
- Key people: M.R. Bimatov (CEO)
- Services: Pre-shipment inspection, sampling, QMS certification according to GOST-R, certification, price information, inspection for damage extent determination as well as quality and quantity control of goods.

The autonomous non-profit organisation Soyuzexpertisa CCI RF (SOEX) is the largest accredited certification body in the Russian Federation, a subsidiary of the Chamber of Commerce and Industry of the Russian Federation. An expert holding, SOEX is involved in laboratory quality and safety control of goods, expertise and audit, certification, and evaluation, provides support in increasing the effectiveness of purchase actions, carries out forensic and construction surveys, performs production quality-control inspections, and tests transportation and storage of electro-technical and power-generation equipment, materials, and nuclear fuel for Russian and foreign companies, as well as rendering services around inspection control of cargo, damage evaluation, and surveyors’ maintenance Main peers in Russia and abroad: SGS, Bureau Veritas S. A., Saуbolt, SGS, Alex Steuard, Russurvey, IMCS, CRS, Inspectorat, Rostest, Transconsulting, Eximtest, Rospromtest

== History ==
On the 19th (6th in the Julian calendar) of October 1917, the Provisional Government passed the statute “On Chambers of Commerce and Industry.” The new legislation initiated the creation of territorial chambers, compulsory membership of all managing subjects, rigid boundaries for activities within one province, liabilities on performance of state functions, and the payment of a membership fee equal to four percent of annual tax payments.

On the 3rd of April 1923, the North-West Regional Chamber created the first Russian bureau of goods expertise, responsible for the determination of the quality of goods, evaluation of their cost, and the definition of normal losses, sizes of damage caused, and other services.

After the 1943 introduction of a new set of regulations, all power over independent expertise became the purview of the National Chamber of Commerce. In the post-war period, the number of surveys carried out grew significantly, and international trade connections strengthened. From 1958 the number of surveys initiated by foreign organisations grew. In 1964, a test centre, GEAZ SOEX, belonging to the expert organisation Soyuzexpertisa CCI RF, was created. The centre was accredited by the Federal Service for accreditation and added to the United register of test laboratories and centres of the Customs union.

In June 1999, the External Economic Union, Soyuzexpertisa CCI RF, was reformed into the autonomous non-profit organisation Soyuzexpertisa CCI RF, a wholly owned subsidiary of CCI RF.

== Company structure and services ==
Today, ANO Soyuzexpertisa CCI RF is the largest independent national expertise organisation in Russia, with a holding structure more than thirty representatives in the largest cities and ports of Russia. It owns a number of accredited laboratories. The main areas of SOEX activity:

- Laboratory testing
- Certification
- Industry safety
- Building expertise
- Evaluation
- Inspection control

ANO Soyusexpertiza CCI RF is a member of the International Federation of Inspection Agencies (IFIA) and the London P&I Club, with business connections with organisations in CIS member countries, inspection corporations, and partnership structures in foreign countries. In 2016 the System of Quality Management was tested against the requirements of international standards, ISO 9001: 2008, in relation to a selection of professional activities such as inspection and certification services, analysis and characterization of goods and documents, and evaluation activities including cadastral land survey. One of the competencies of the organisation in the area of international cooperation (more than forty years’ experience) is to work with companies carrying out construction or reconstruction of large-scale industry facilities and provisioning specialised equipment sourced across the globe. The organisation carries out: schedule control of production and delivery of equipment (applied if the delivery date is fixed) in factories in Russia and abroad; participation in product testing upon delivery; inspection of delivery, packaging, conservation, and marking; loading control for trailers and freight train carriages, and placement of cargo on transport ships according to a cargo plan (in harbour). SOEX renders a broad variety of services around manufacturing quality control of electro-technical and power-generation equipment and nuclear fuel on behalf of both Russian enterprises and foreign firms. ANO Soyuzexperyiza CCI RF meets the most stringent inspection requirements on all types of electro-technical and power-generation equipment and nuclear fuel through all phases of project execution. SOEX experts perform the equipment inspections for the Salto Grande, Piedra del Aguila, Los Caracoles, TPP Baia-Blanca hydro-electric stations in Argentina.

ANO Soyuzexperyiza CCI RF, through its subsidiary SOEX-NEVA, operates both in the Russian market and at the international level on behalf of major foreign companies, providing cargo inspection services, survey services, and cause and consequence analysis of insured events both in Russia and abroad.
