= Russian State Social University =

Russian university

- Российский государственный социальный университет
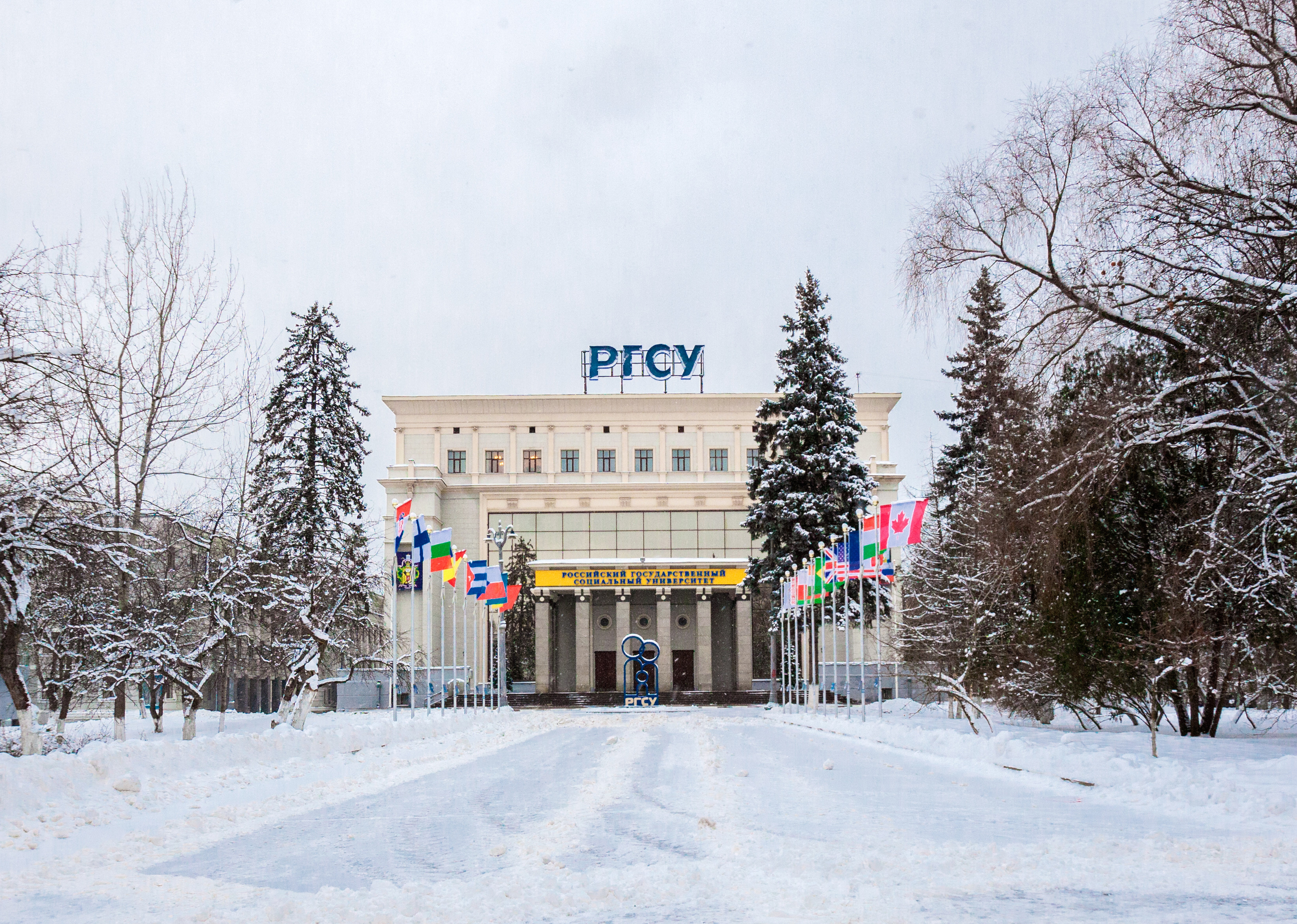
- Other names: RSSU
- Former names: Russian State Social Institute Moscow State Social University
- Motto: Будь первым вместе с Первым социальным!
- Motto in English: Be the first along with the First Social!
- Type: Public
- Established: 1991
- Rector: Andrey Khazin
- Academic staff: 1,686
- Students: 25,192
- Location: Moscow, Russia; 55°50′11″N 37°38′2″E
- Language: Russian
- Colours
- Website: rgsu.net

University rankings

Regional – Overall
- QS Emerging Europe and Central Asia: 351-400 (2022)

Russian State Social University (RSSU; Russian: Российский государственный социальный университет, abbreviated as РГСУ) was the first public university in the Russian Federation to offer undergraduate and graduate programmes in the field of social work. It is located in Moscow and has three main campuses. Russian State Social University is recognized as a fully accredited, state-owned, traditional institution. The current rector is Andrey Khazin.

== History ==
RSSU was founded in 1991 with the mandate to continue the core of the research and teaching activities of the former Higher School of the Communist Party. Initially, research and teaching were focused on the social and political sciences. Gradually, University activities extended into project work on social policy for State Institutions, as well as the education and support of acting administrators. RSSU launched educational programs in the areas of Social Work, Social Youth Work, Social Insurance, Social Gerontology and Social Support for the disabled. Since starting these programs, more than 400 000 social workers have graduated from the University.

== Historical highlights ==
- 1991: Russian State Social Institute was established by an act № 15 of the Government of the Russian Federation.
- 1991: At Losiny Ostrov National Park, the first campus of Russian State Social Institute was opened.
- 1994: Russian State Social Institute was renamed to Moscow State Social University.
- 1998: Moscow State Social University was granted with the public traditional university status.
- 1999: Stromynka campus was founded.
- 2003: University received a campus on Wilhelm Pieck Street.
- In 2005 Russian State Social University received its current name.
- 2005: On the territory of the Russian State Social University campus was founded the orthodox church named after the Feodorovskaya Icon of the Mother of God.

== Faculties ==
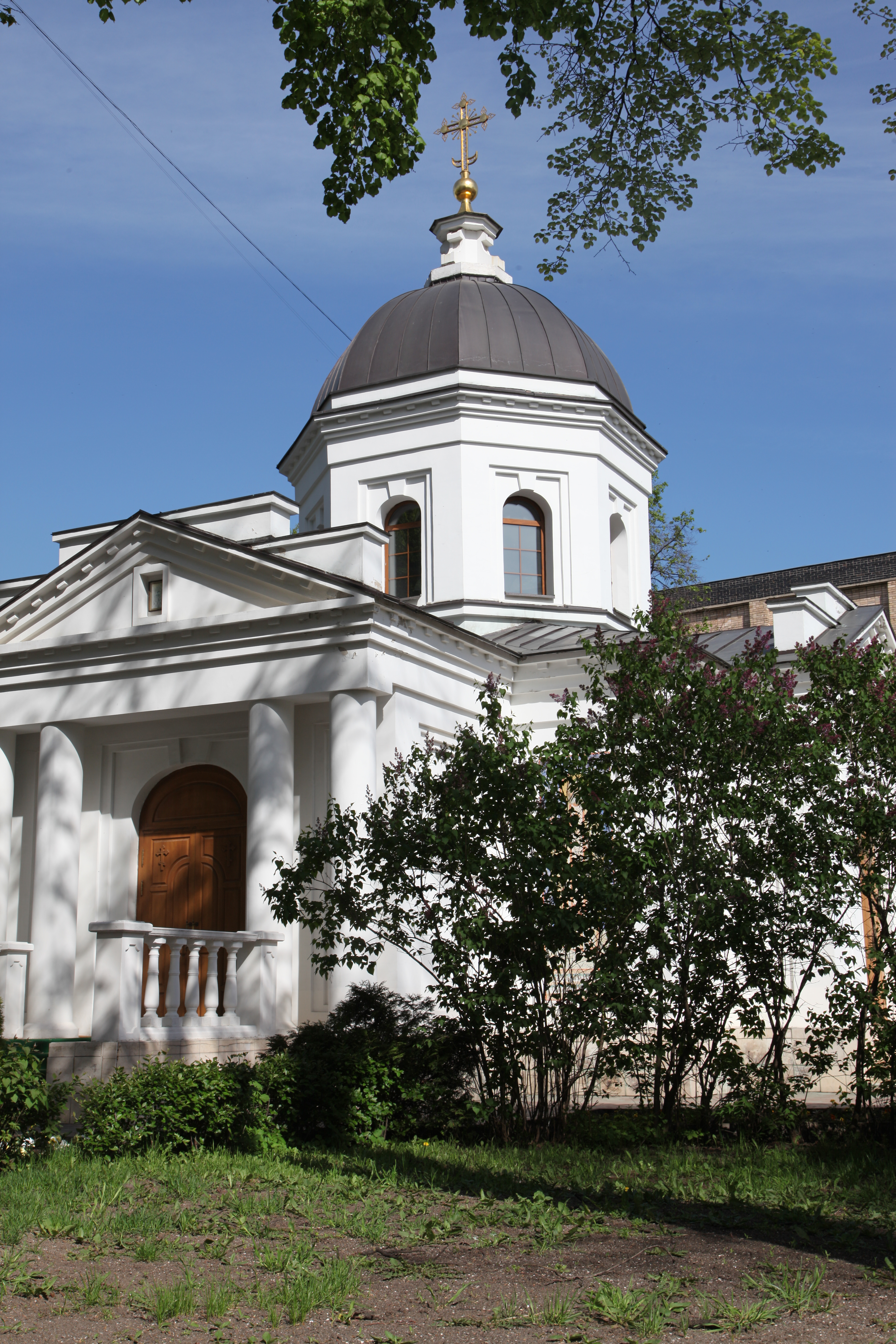
Orthodox church on the territory of the Russian State Social University campus in Moscow

RSSU has 16 faculties which are connected to the variety of scientific fields.

- Faculty of Sociology
- Faculty of Information Technologies
- Faculty of Psychology
- Faculty of Art and Cultural Activities
- Faculty of Law
- Faculty of Linguistics
- Faculty of Social Work
- Faculty of Humanities
- Faculty of Economics
- Faculty of Pre-University Training
- Faculty of Management
- Faculty of Further Education
- Faculty of Communication Management
- Faculty of Distance Education
- Faculty of Postgraduate Studies
- Preparatory Faculty for International Students

Among the specialties for undergraduate, graduate and doctoral programs could be found: Sociology, Social Work, Youth Outreach Management, Psychology, Conflict Analysis and Resolution, Economics, Management, Human Resources Management, Business Information Systems, Psychology and Pedagogical Studies, Special Education, Linguistics, International Relations etc.

== Campuses ==
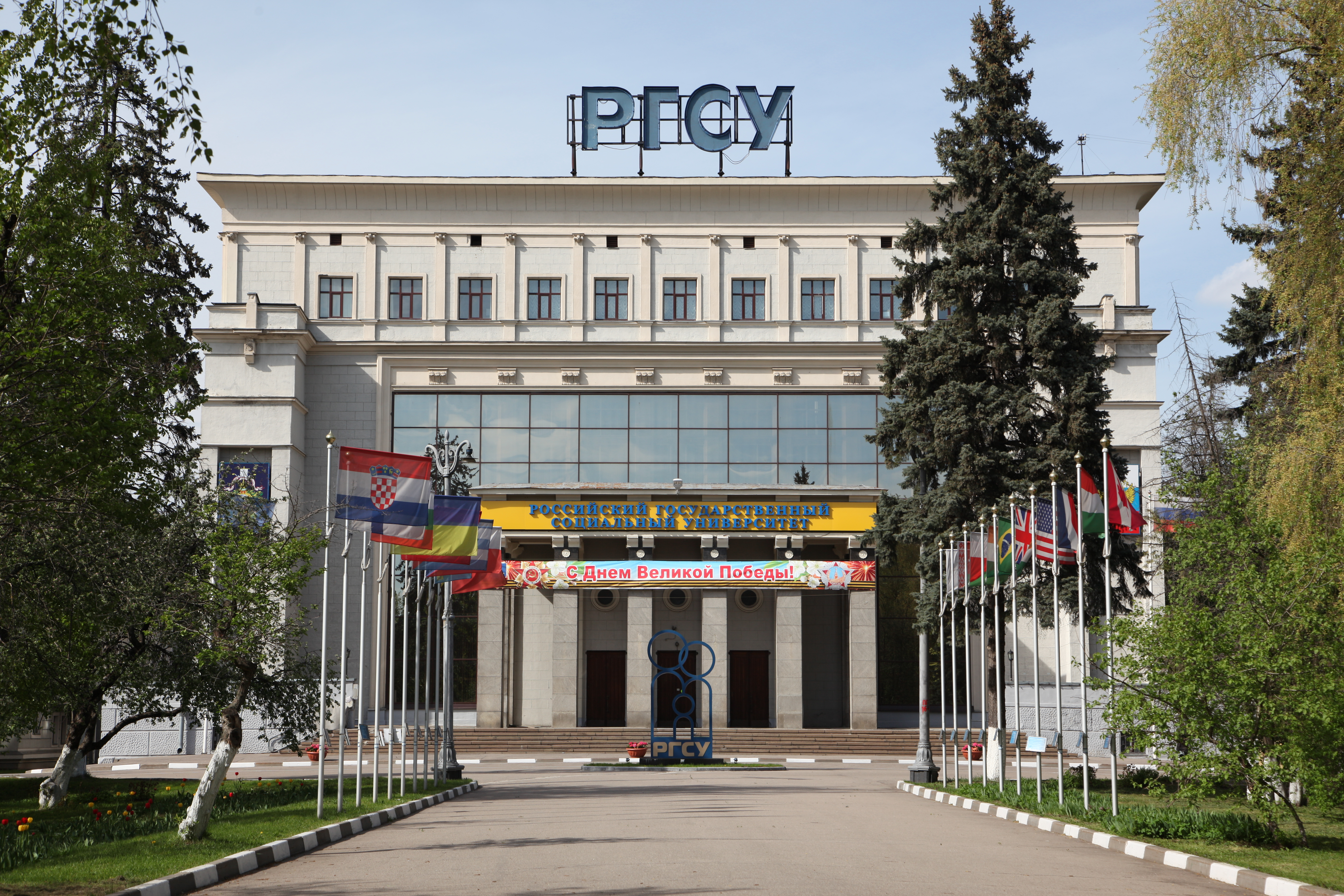
Main building of Russian State Social University (campus on Wilhelm Pieck Street)

RSSU campuses are located in different sides of Moscow, and each of them has a unique history.

Campus on Wilhelm Pieck Street

There is a complex of academic and administrative buildings on Wilhelm Pieck Street, including a library and sports facilities.

The current main building of the Russian State Social University starting from the 1920s there was a headquarters of International Academy for the Trade-Union Movement, where were built-up the members of Communist Parties from different countries, where these activities were banned. The Communist International (Comintern) settled in the same building from 1938 till 1943. During that time there were working such important players of the International Movement. From 1943, in the building was located the Soviet Information Bureau, sort of a fusion between the KGB, the Ministry of Foreign Affairs and the Soviet Counterintelligence. In 1956, the main building on Wilhelm Pieck Street passed to the Higher Party School, which in 1959 was replaced by the Marx-Engels-Lenin Institute, existed there until 1991. In 2003 it became a part of Russian State Social University campus.

Campus on Stromynka Street

Academic buildings, students admission office, cultural center and a medical center are parts of the territory of the campus on Stromynka Street.

Campuses on Losiny Ostrov National Park

This RSSU campus on Losiny Ostrov National Park are surrounded by the forest. Academic buildings, college, and student dormitories are parts of the campus area.

== International relations ==
Russian State Social University receives more than a hundred students participating in the mobility programs annually from Europe, South America, Asia and CIS countries. Among the partner universities could be found the followings:

- National University of Cuyo
- University of Łódź
- Pai Chai University
- University of Huelva
- University of Ostrava
- Dalian University of Foreign Languages

== Notable alumni ==
- Borodakova, Maria – volleyball player, a member of the national team (2005-2013), world champion (2006, 2010), master of sports of the Russian Federation.
- Galushka, Alexander – Minister for the Development of the Russian Far East.
- Gamova, Ekaterina – volleyball player of the national team, world champion, master of sports of the Russian Federation.
- Kapranova, Olga – athlete, the world and European champion, master of sports of the Russian Federation.
- Karjakin, Sergey – chess player, the youngest grandmaster in history (Guinness Record), master of sports of Ukraine.
- Kulikovskaya, Evgenia – tennis player and coach, master of sports of the Russian Federation (1998), the winner of four tournaments WTA (1996).
- Metov, Kay – songwriter and composer, honored Artist of Russia (2015);
- Nepomnyashchii, Ian – chess player, European champion (2010), Russian champion (2010).
- Pochinok, Natalia – Doctor of Economics, professor, rector of the Russian State Social University
- Yakimenko, Vasily – public figure and politician, businessman, founder and permanent leader of the youth movement «Moving Together».

== See also ==
- Education in Russia
- List of universities in Russia
