= Natalya Pochinok =

Russian professor (born 1976)

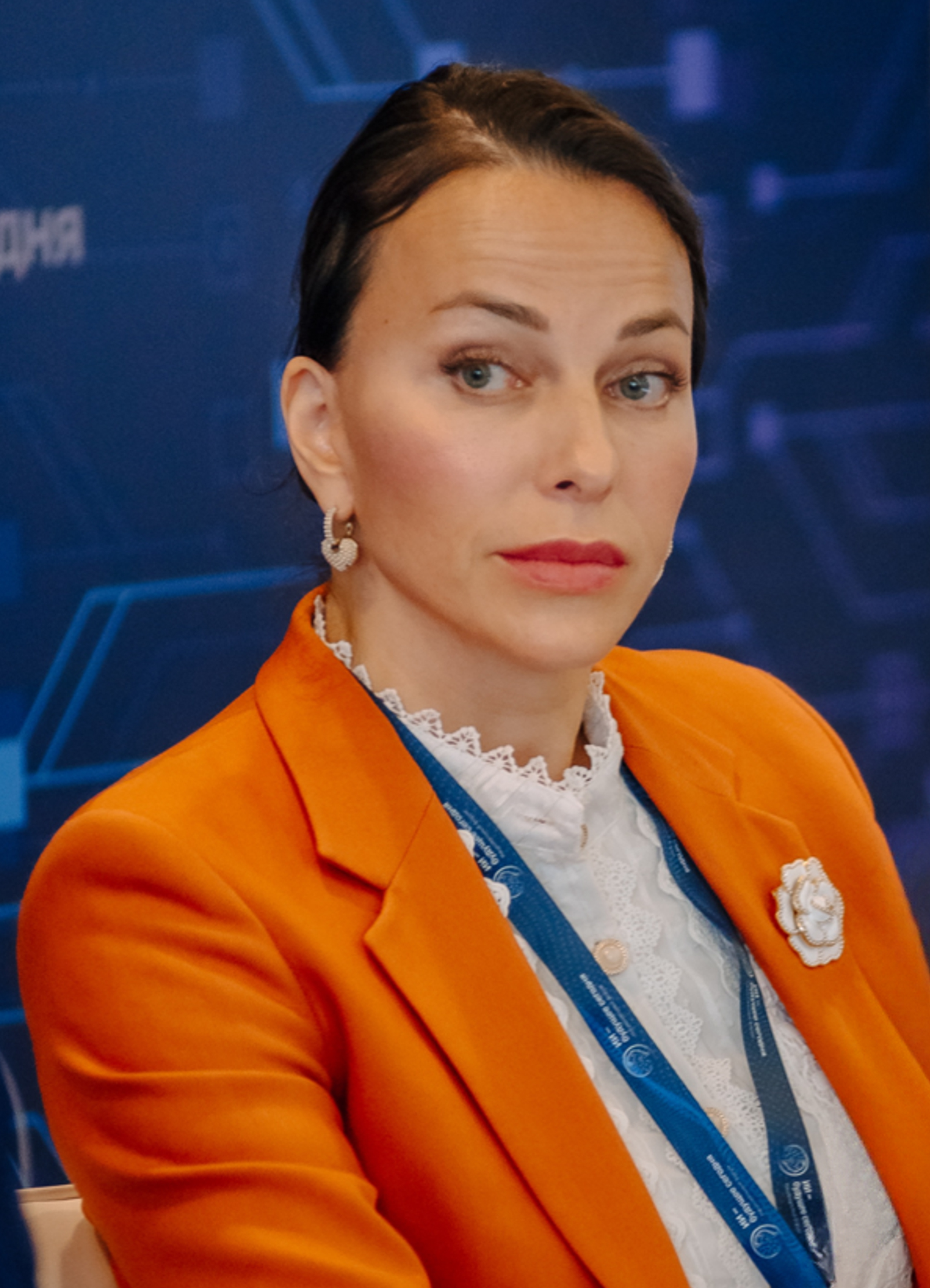

Personal details
- Born: 4 July 1976 Moscow, Russian SFSR, USSR
- Citizenship: Russia
- Education: Plekhanov Russian University of Economics; Russian State Social University
- Occupation: Economist; Sociologist; Manager; University lecturer

Natalya Borisovna Pochinok born Gribkova (Russian: Наталья Борисовна Починок) is a D.Sc. in Economic Sciences, professor, rector of Russian State Social University (2014-2021). Member of the Civic Chamber of Russia (2017-2023).

== Biography ==
As a member of junior national teams of the USSR and the Russian Federation in athletics Natalia Pochinok won several international competitions in running from 1991 to 1994. Master of Sports of Russia in athletics.

She holds two undergraduate academic degrees – in Economics (graduated from Plekhanov Russian University of Economics in 1997) and in Law (RSSU, 2002). In 2001 Natalya Pochinok defended her dissertation on “Taxes in the Mechanism of Foreign Investment Attraction in Russia”. In 2005 she was awarded an academic research degree Doctor of Sciences in Economics (topic of the postdoctoral dissertation “Taxes in the System of State Regulation of the Economy in Russia”). She is currently a professor at the Graduate School of Business Engineering, Institute of Industrial Management, Economics and Trade, Peter the Great St. Petersburg Polytechnic University.

Natalya Pochinok worked in the consulting business (Arthur Andersen, PricewaterhouseCoopers Audit) from 1996 to 2003, and in the banking sector, from 2003 to 2013 (vice-president of Gazprombank, Director of the Southern Regional Branch of Raiffeisen Bank, Director of the Sberbank Office for Work with Regional Branches). From 1998 to 2005 she was a lecturer in the Tax Policy Department of Plekhanov Russian University of Economics. From 2011 to 2014 Natalia Pochinok served there as a professor and the Head of the Taxes and Taxation Department.

From June 2, 2014, she performed the duties of the rector of Russian State Social University after being appointed by the Ministry of Education and Science of the Russian Federation. In January 2015, Pochinok was elected rector of RSSU according to the results of voting by the members of the RSSU Conference of Scientific and Pedagogical Workers and Students.

Her research interests initially focused on pensions, fiscal and tax policies, social aspects of the economy; social entrepreneurship and customer-oriented service model of social services are of particular interest. Her current research interests include the study of the impact of IT products on environmental, social and governance (ESG) aspects of sustainable development, as well as the integration of sustainable digital development standards into educational programmes for students. From April 2016 onwards serves a member of the Civic Chamber of Moscow.

From 2014 to 2017, she was a member of the Strategic Development Council of Russian Post (FSUE).

In November 2021, Pochinok was resigned from the position of rector of the RSSU of her own accord.

From 2017 to 2023, she was a member of the Civic Chamber of the Russian Federation (seventh and eighth convocations) where she served as the Chairman of the Commission on Social Policy, Labor Relations, Cooperation with Trade Unions and Veterans Support.

In 2022, at the initiative of Natalya Pochinok, an advisory body—the Coordination Council on Environmental, Social and Governance (ESG) and Sustainable Development—was established under the Civic Chamber of the Russian Federation. Natalya Pochinok has over fifteen years’ pedagogical experience.

She was married to the former Minister of Labor and Social Development, Alexander Pochinok. She has two sons.

Since December 2021, she has been the managing partner for the Digital ESG direction at the IBS Group.

Since 2023, she has chaired the Council for the Certification of IT Specialists and the Council on Sustainable Digital Development at the Association of Computer and Information Technology Enterprises (APKIT).

== Awards ==
- Medal of the Order “For Merit to the Fatherland”, II class
- Medal of the Civic Chamber of the Russian Federation “For Merit to Society”
- Medal of Saint Euphrosyne, Grand Princess of Moscow
