= Metal-Expo =

Metal-Expo is an international exhibition for steel producers, users, as well as manufacturers and suppliers of steel processing equipment. It has been held yearly since 1995 in Moscow at the All-Russia Exhibition Centre.

Metal-Expo Co. Ltd. is a full member of the Global Association of the Exhibition Industry (UFI), Russian Union of Exhibitions and Fairs, and Russian Union of Metal and Steel Suppliers. The company is an associate member of The Russian Union of Industrialists and Entrepreneurs (RSPP).

== Segments ==
Metal-Expo consists of 15 major segments of the steel and related industries:

- Ferrous industry: manufacturing process and products of the ferrous industry (billets, long products, flats, tubes and pipes)
- Non-ferrous industry: manufacturing process and products of the non-ferrous industry (raw materials, secondary metals, semi-finished products, rolled products, and profiles)
- High conversion products: tubes and pipes, coated sheets, metal and steel products, special steels and alloys etc.
- Equipment and technologies for the steel and mining industries.
- Raw materials for the metal and steel industries (iron ore, ferroalloys, non-ferrous metal ores, coke etc.)
- Ferrous and non-ferrous scrap collecting and recycling.
- Transportation and logistics, stocking in steel industry and metal and steel trading.
- Equipment and technologies for warehouses and steel service centers.
- Sheet metal and long products processing: cutting, shaping, bending, and welding.
- Welding materials, equipment and technologies.
- Refractory materials, technical ceramics for the steel industry and foundry.
- Scientific research and developments in the ferrous and non-ferrous industries as well as nanotechnologies.
- Mass media, IT technologies, online-trading, automation of industrial processes and business for the steel industry and metalworking.
- Ecology in the steel industry, labor protection and safety.
- Financing, investments, insurance, leasing.

== Other projects of Metal-Expo, JSC ==
- MetallStroyForum International Exhibition for Steel Products and Structures for Construction
- MetallurgMash International Exhibition for Equipment and Technologies for Steel Industry and Metalworking
- MetallTransLogistik International Exhibition for Transportation and Logistics for Mining and Metallurgical Complex
- Metallurgy.Litmash, Tube. Russia, Aluminium/Non-Ferrous, international industrial exhibitions for the ferrous and non-ferrous industries, tubes and pipes, equipment, and technologies
