= Chamber of Commerce and Industry of the Russian Federation =

Russian non-governmental organization

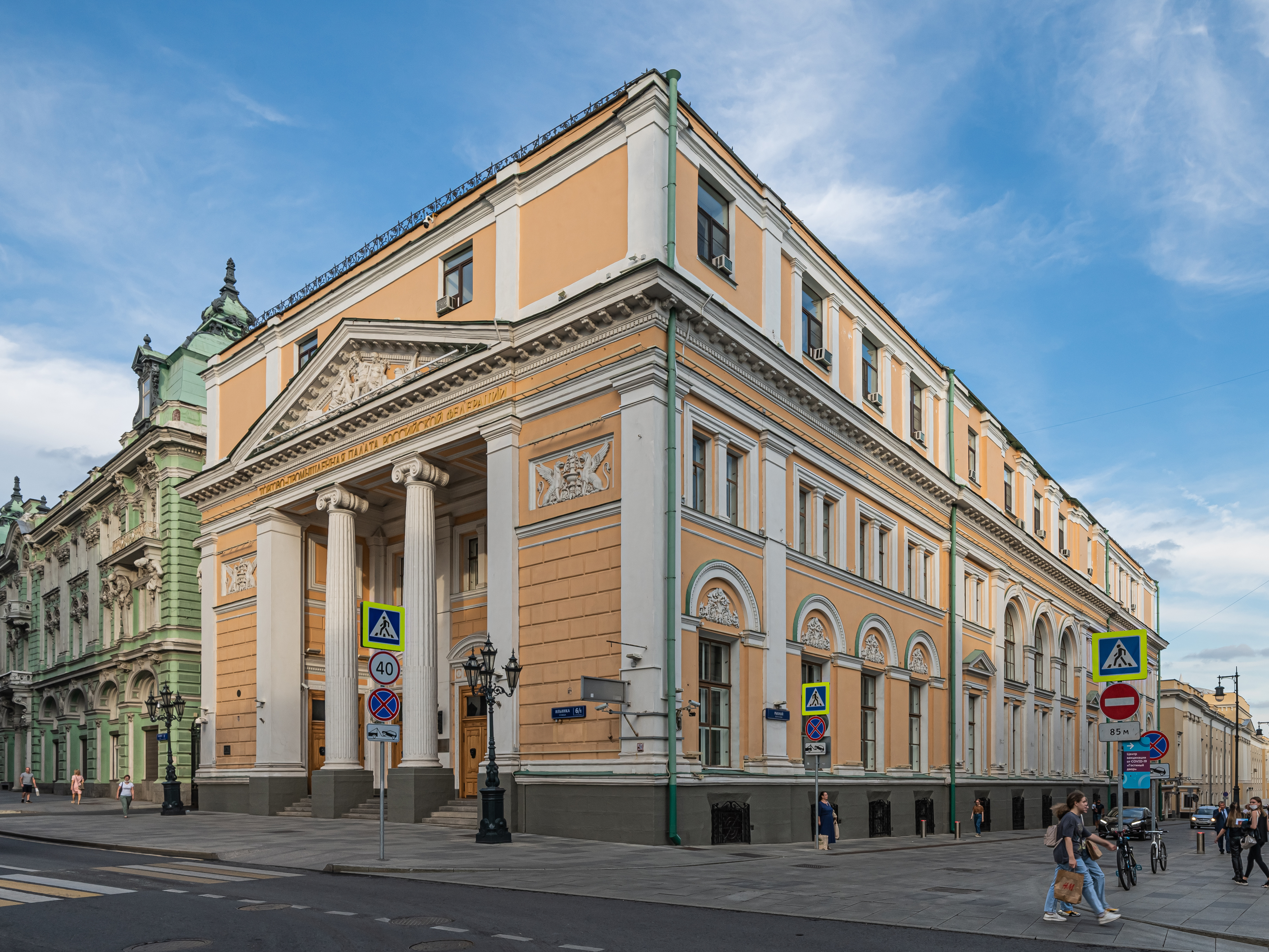
The Chamber of Commerce and Industry building in Moscow, 6/1 Ilyinka Street

The Chamber of Commerce and Industry of the Russian Federation (RF CCI, Russian: Торгово-промышленная палата Российской Федерации, ТПП РФ) is a non-governmental, non-profit organization that operates under the Russian Federation Law on Chambers of Commerce and Industry in the Russian Federation and the Chamber's Charter and represents the interests of small, medium-size, and big businesses encompassing all business sectors—manufacturing, domestic and foreign trade, agriculture, the finance system, and the services. Chaired by Sergey Katyrin.

== Mission ==
The Chamber formulates its mission as to “promote the growth of the Russian economy and its integration into the world economic system and provide favorable conditions for the advancement of all business sectors.”

== History ==
In March 1910 a bill on the introduction of chambers of commerce and industry in Russia was drawn up, but the statute "On chambers of commerce and industry" was approved only on October 6, 1917 by the Russian Provisional Government. The document outlined principal goals, tasks and authority of chambers of commerce and industry in Russia.

After the end of the Russian Civil War and a transfer to the New Economic Policy (NEP), on November 11, 1921 the North-Western Chamber was incorporated in Petrograd. In December 1922, the Eastern Chamber of Commerce began its operations in the Soviet republics Bukhara and Khorezm.

On May 28, 1932 the USSR Council of People's Commissars approved the Charter of the All-Union Chamber of Commerce. The AUCC was headquartered in Moscow. In 1972 it became the USSR Chamber of Commerce and Industry.

In 1988 the USSR CCI congress approved opening regional and municipal affiliations. That was when the foundation of the present-day Russia's CCI network was laid down.

19 regional chambers of commerce and industry and several dozens of associations of entrepreneurs participated in the foundation congress of the CCI of the Russian Soviet Federative Socialist Republic in October 1991.

On March 18, 1993 RF president signed the decree "On the Chamber of Commerce and Industry of the Russian Federation." It was later updated and constitutionalized as the RF Law "On Chambers of Commerce and Industry in the Russian Federation."

== Structure and major activities ==
At present the Chamber comprises:

- over 170 regional chambers of commerce and industry;
- nearly 200 federal-level and over 250 regional-level entrepreneurs' trade associations and similar regional associations representing the key sectors of the Russian economy;
- over 70 major companies in the key sectors of the country's economy;
- about 40,000 enterprises and organizations in various ownership categories;
- upward of 30 RF CCI committees responsible for various lines of activities and business sectors, some 800 committees, commissions, councils, other nongovernmental units created by territorial chambers; and other public formations set up by territorial chambers;
- representative offices abroad.

The Chamber of Commerce and Industry of the Russian Federation is a member of the International Chamber of Commerce, the World Chambers Federation, the Eurochambres, the Council of the Chairmen of Chambers of Commerce and Industry in CIS Member Countries, and other international and regional organizations.

The International Trade Center, Moscow Expo Center, Sojusekspertisa, and Sojuzpatent associations, along with over 350 other enterprises and firms set up by the Chamber of Commerce and Industry of the Russian Federation and its regional chambers of commerce and industry form the infrastructure that provides services to businesses at the federal and regional levels.

The Chamber of Commerce and Industry of the Russian Federation provides the following services:

- expert examination of goods;
- appraisal of property;
- holding of exhibitions and fairs;
- intellectual property protection;
- information services and legal consultations;
- keeping of non-governmental registers of experts in goods inspection and property appraisal, and the Reliable Partners Register;
- verifying of force majeure circumstances;
- execution of documents related to international economic activity;
- accrediting of foreign firms.

Commercial dispute settlement institutions at the Chamber of Commerce and Industry of the Russian Federation:

- International Commercial Arbitration Court;
- Court of Arbitration for Resolution of Economic Disputes;
- Maritime Arbitration Commission;
- Court of Arbitration for Sport;
- Association of Average Adjusters;
- Panel of Mediators in Conciliation Proceedings.

The Chamber of Commerce and Industry of the Russian Federation publishes the Commerce and Industry News newspaper, and the RF CCI Partner magazine.

== See also ==
- Metal-Expo
