= Uralsib =

Russian commercial bank

- Type: Joint-stock company
- Traded as: MCX: USBN
- Industry: Banking
- Founded: 1993
- Headquarters: Moscow, Russia
- Revenue: 48,684,100,000 Russian ruble (2017)
- Net income: RUB 172.589 million (2020)
- Total assets: RUB 505.592 billion (2020)
- Total equity: RUB 409.196 billion (2020)
- Number of employees: 10750 (2021)
- Rating: B2 (Moody's) (2020) B/B (S&P) (2021)
- Website: uralsib.ru

Uralsib (Russian: ПАО «Банк Уралсиб») is a Russian commercial bank, headquartered in Moscow. According to Russian Forbes, as of 2022, it was one of the country's largest banks with the net asset value of approximately 530 billion rubles.

Uralsib is a successor company to Bashcreditbank (since 2001, known as Ural-Siberian Bank) founded in 1993 by Bashkortostan's government. The bank was created by merging Ural-Siberian Bank and Avtobank-NIKoil in 2005. The latter was Nikolai Tsvetkov's company closely affiliated to LUKoil. In 2013, it employed 19,342 people.

Uralsib is said to have been "roiled by mismanagement", with its founder Tsvetkov agreeing to step down in 2015 in return for a bailout, as the bank was on the verge of bankruptcy and having its banking license revoked. During his time as chairman Tsvetkov became known for his application of New Age philosophy to company management, which included requiring all employees to read books by a self-help guru and holding spiritual seminars to determine promotions.

An 82% stake in Uralsib was sold to Vladimir Kogan in November 2015 to avoid bankruptcy. As part of a rescue plan, Russia's Deposit Insurance Agency also agreed to a $224 million rescue package for the bank. In 2016 Uralsib was ranked as the second least reliable bank in the country by the Russian version of Forbes. In June 2017 Moody's raised the credit rating of Uralsib from Caa1 to B3, reflecting the bank's return to operational profitability.

After the death of Vladimir Kogan in 2019, his shares were inherited by a widow, Lyudmila Kogan. The supervisory board of Uralsib is headed by the eldest son of Vladimir Kogan Yevgeny Kogan.

At the end of 2019, the bank reported a net profit of 12.8 billion rubles (approx $170 million) and an increase in capital to 94.3 billion rubles (approx $1.27 billion).

At the beginning of 2021, The Banker placed Uralsib on the third line of the Top 50 Russian banks (and on the first line in terms of profitability). In April 2021, Uralsib Bank entered the Forbes rating of the best banks in the world; it took 13th place among Russian banks.

In February 2024, the Bank of Russia announced the early termination of measures to prevent the bankruptcy of Uralsib and that the bank’s stable financial position had been restored. Uralsib shares on the Moscow Exchange reacted to this message with a sharp increase (more than 20%).

== Activity ==
Uralsib Bank has the status of a Principal Member of the international payment systems Visa, Mastercard, American Express, Union Pay and the Russian payment system Mir. Bank "Uralsib" performs the function of a third-party processing center of the PS "Mir".

On December 12, 2022, Uralsib completed the purchase of Citibank retail loan portfolio.

On July 24, 2023, the Russian credit rating agency NKR upgraded the rating of Uralsib Bank to A.ru with a “stable” outlook. The assessment took into account the bank's high capital adequacy and low risk appetite.

== Sanctions ==
Uralsib Bank was sanctioned by the United States and the United Kingdom on 24 February 2023 in relation to the 2022 Russian invasion of Ukraine. Increased in December 2023 by the UK to include a prohibition on correspondent banking relationships.

Sanctioned by Canada on 22 August 2023 for association with the Putin regime.

== Management ==
Board of the bank as of February 2021:

- Aleksei Sazonov (chairman)
- Yevgeny Abuzov
- Igor Seleznyov
- Galina Sergeeva
- Pyotr Petrov
- Stanislav Tyves

== Honours ==
- Winner of the award "The best in Russia — companies and persons of the Year" in the nomination "Media Bank" (2021)
- Winner of the National Banking Award in the nomination "A bank that values its employees" (2021)
