= Heesen Yachts =

Shipyard in Oss, Netherlands

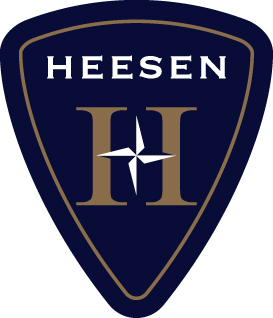
- Industry: Shipbuilding
- Founded: 1978; 48 years ago
- Founders: Frans Heesen
- Headquarters: Netherlands
- Products: Custom Built Superyachts
- Website: heesenyachts.com

Heesen Yachts is a Dutch ship building company that specialises in custom-built superyachts. Founded in 1978, it has launched more than 200 yachts since its inception, many of which have won awards. It is considered one of the world leaders in the design, construction and engineering of all-aluminum yachts.

The company is owned by Dutch billionaire Laurens Last. On April 9, 2025 it was announced that Laurens Last had bought Heesen Yachts for an undisclosed amount.

== History ==
Heesen Yachts was founded in 1978 by Frans Heesen, an entrepreneur who at the time was best known for his work in the plastics industry. Heesen purchased the Striker Boats shipyard site in the Netherlands as a potential home for another business, but decided to retain the property as a shipyard and continue its operations. One year following the purchase, Heesen launched the 20-metre (66 ft) Amigo, a luxury yacht that was the first to bear the Heesen name.

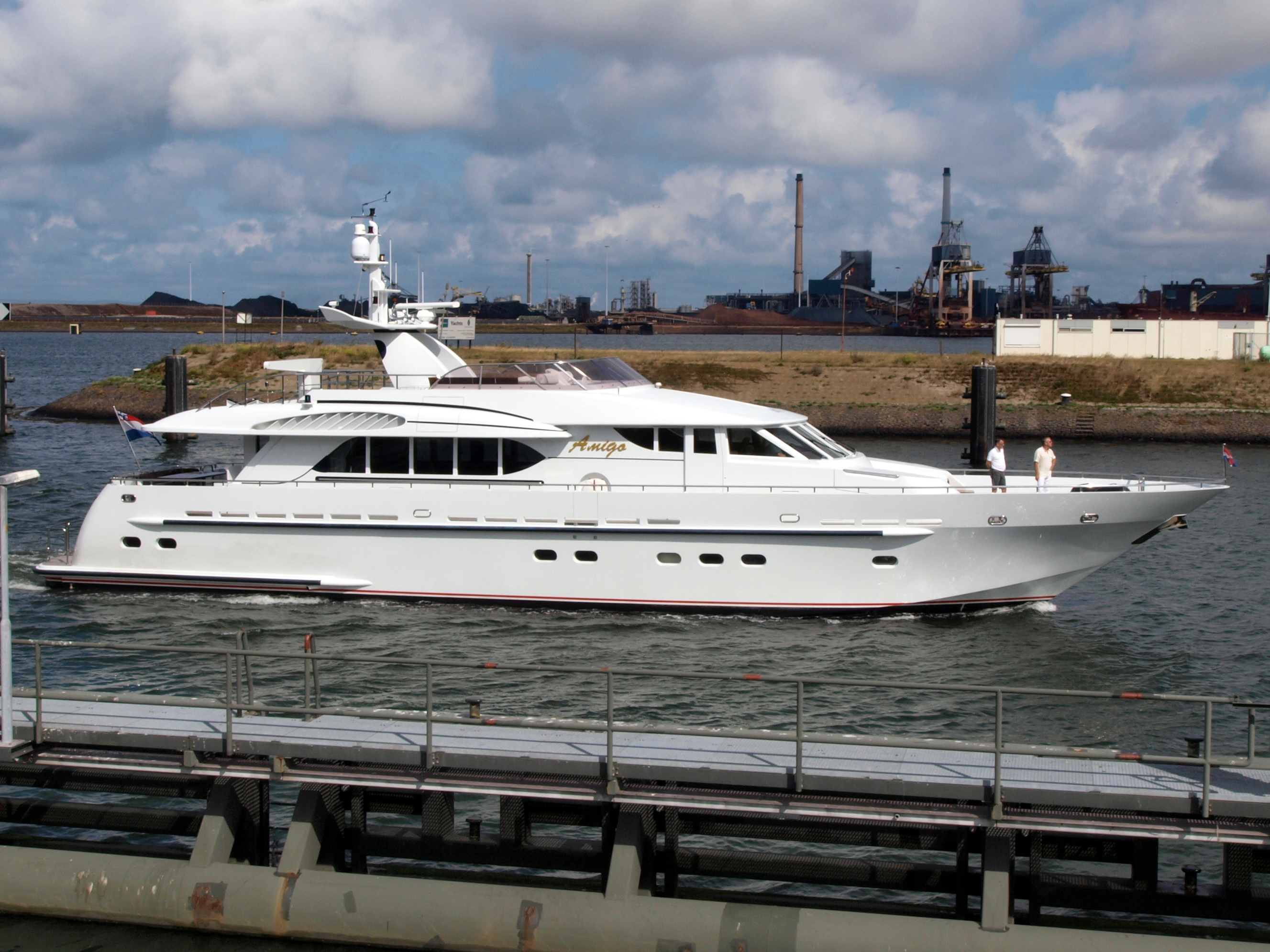
Amigo in 2009

=== Octopussy - the breakthrough project ===
While Heesen had built a number of relatively advanced yachts in its first decade, 1988 would prove to be the yard’s breakthrough year. The yard had been commissioned by American entrepreneur John Staluppi to build a superyacht that could do more than 50 knots. The challenge was not inconsequential – at the time, being able to reach 25 knots with a large yacht was considered a feat of engineering, and the thought of doubling that was, for most, inconceivable. Staluppi had already purchased his propulsion package – three MTU engines with a combined output of 7,500 hp, and three KaMeWa waterjet units – and the German engine manufacturer put him in contact with Dutch naval architect Frank Mulder and Frans Heesen. The contract had a penalty clause that included a rising financial penalty for each tenth of a knot the yacht missed the 50-knot target, and a clause that said Staluppi could walk away altogether if the yacht didn’t reach 48 knots. Undeterred, Frans Heesen and his – at the time – small team took on the project. The resulting 44-metre yacht – delivered in 1988 – was named Octopussy after the 1983 James Bond film. Octopussy actually exceeded her contractual speed (thus earning the yard a bonus) and was at the time the fastest superyacht on record, registering a top speed of 53.17 knots. Octopussy was refitted and lengthened by another company years later and, due to the weight the works added, fell out of the rankings of the world's fastest yachts.

=== Into the 1990s ===
By 1990, Heesen had built more than 25 yachts over 27 metres (89 ft) in length, earning it a reputation as one of the world's leading custom yacht builders. Mirage, formerly El Corsario – considered a sister design to Octopussy – was launched by Heesen in 1991. It used triple waterjets as propulsion and was ranked as the 16th fastest yacht in the world by Boat International. It has a cruising speed of 45 knots and can reach a top speed of up to 48 knots.

In 1992, the company expanded its business to include the construction of traditional-displacement, long-range, steel-hulled yachts. This was marked by the launch of the 50-metre (160 ft) motor yacht Achiever in collaboration with Oceanco.

In 1996 Heesen, already known for its earlier Striker sport fishing boats, entered the market for large sport fishing yachts with the delivery of the 37-metre (121 ft) Obsession, a yacht that could reach a speed of 33 knots. At that time she was the world's largest sport fishing yacht.

=== The new millennium ===
Heesen expanded in 2003, the same year it launched its 3700 and 4400 yacht series, which marked one of the earliest examples of superyacht building on a shared hull and engineering platform. The expansion included the building of a new construction facility.

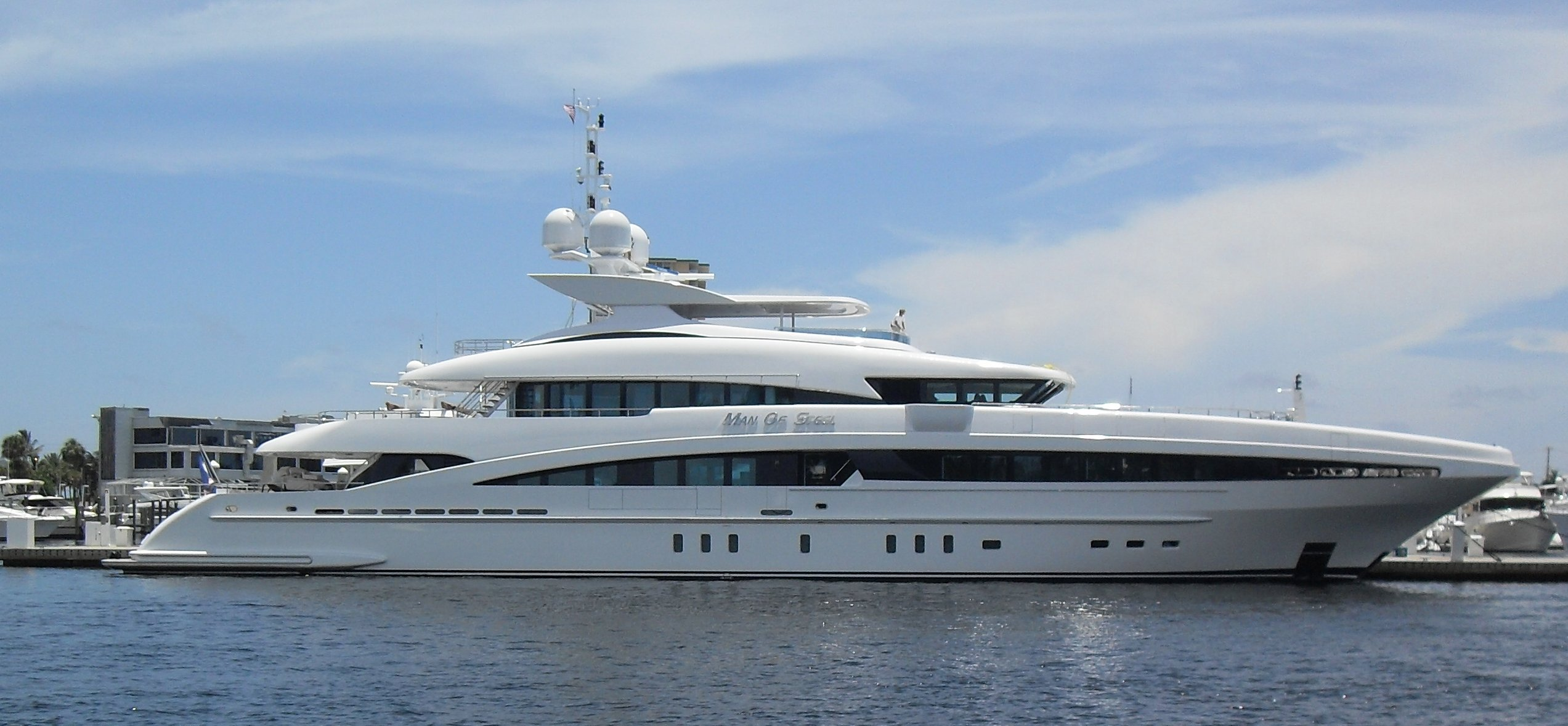
Heesen Luxury yacht Man of Steel, at Bahia Mar marina in Fort Lauderdale, Florida, US, in 2009

Frans Heesen sold the yard to Russian billionaire Vagit Alekperov in 2008 for a reported $150 million. Heesen Yachts was featured in Voyages of M/Y AlumerciA, a 2011 book written by Andrew Rogers. The book documents the voyages between 2001 and 2010 of the eponymous motor yacht that was built by Heesen. In 2013, Heesen launched the 65-metre (213 ft) Fast Displacement yacht Galactica Star, a custom-built yacht with a top speed of 28.8 knots. It has received nine awards including a World Superyacht Award. Heesen also launched another World Superyacht Award winning yacht – Satori – in 2011. Frans Heesen retired from the company in 2012, 35 years after founding Heesen Yachts. On Wednesday 23 April 2025, Frans Heesen died peacefully in his hometown Oss.

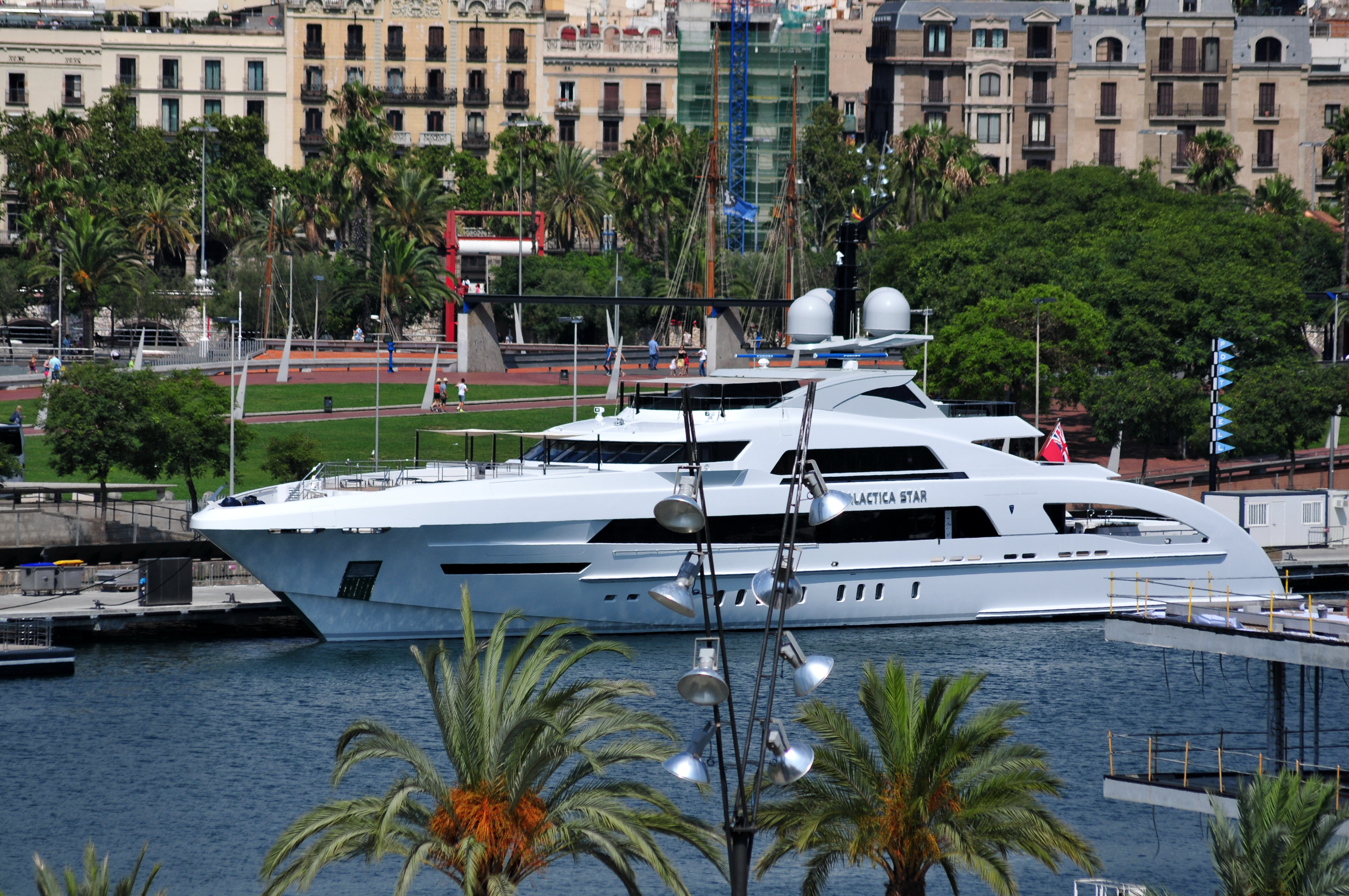
Galactica Star in Barcelona in 2014

Heesen Yachts' second largest project to date, a 70-metre (230 ft) aluminium Fast Displacement superyacht, was delivered in the spring of 2016. Named Galactica Super Nova, she was designed in collaboration with Espen Oeino and has a top speed of 30 knots. In 2017 the yard also delivered the world's first hybrid-powered Fast Displacement yacht, a 50-metre (160 ft) named Home.

Heesen continues to develop new designs and new platform-build ranges alongside custom projects. In 2018 construction began on the yard's largest steel displacement yacht to date, Project Falcon. In January 2019 another ground-breaking Heesen yacht – Irisha – won the Best Exterior Styling award in the Motor Yachts 40m to 59m category at the Boat International Design and Innovation Awards. In November 2019 Heesen also announced a collaboration with the British studio Winch Design for a range of innovative FDHF explorer yachts named Xventure.

Also in 2019 Heesen confirmed the sale of a 59-metre (194 ft) custom yacht that features the yard's most powerful propulsion package to date – four waterjets providing a combined 22,000 horsepower. Named Project Skyfall, the yacht is capable of speeds up to 37 knots. Her hull and superstructure were joined in August 2021 and the yacht was completed in 2023.

=== 2020 and beyond ===
Responding to the impact of the COVID-19 pandemic, Heesen was quick to implement a raft of new working practices in order not only to meet local and national government guidelines but also to protect its workforce. As a result, the yard has been able not only to continue its operations, but also keep the various projects under construction on schedule. The yard was also quick to develop alternative methods of promotion and communication with clients, including virtual tours, online press briefings, Zoom happy hours, and a talk show called YachtTalk by Heesen.

Among the yachts currently in build are four scheduled for delivery in 2024 and the yard’s production schedule currently stretches out to deliveries in 2027. As of early 2024 the yard has 13 yachts under construction for a total of 694 linear metres and 8,755 GT. The yard continues to work with a wide variety of designers, and current projects include exterior and interior designs from the boards of Frank Laupman/Omega Architects, Winch Design, Clifford Denn, Bannenberg & Rowell, Luca Dini, and others. As the Dutch leader in the 40m+ segment, Heesen has delivered 35 yachts between 2013 and 2022.

== Project Sparta ==
In 2019 Heesen confirmed the sale of a 67-metre (220 ft) steel yacht, which is being built as Project Sparta. At the end of April 2021 the hull of the 67-metre Project Sparta was turned right way up, ready to begin the next phase of construction with her engineering fit-out. Project Sparta is notable for being the largest steel yacht Heesen has undertaken to date, as well as being the largest steel Fast Displacement Hull Form design yet built. With exterior and interior design by renowned UK studio Winch Design, Project Sparta combines the sleek lines of a raised pilothouse and reverse sheer with obvious luxury features, including a 6.5-metre infinity pool aft, and a huge 1,200 gross tons of internal volume. Twin MTU diesels will give her a top speed of 16 knots, and a transoceanic range of 4,500 miles at 12 knots. Her hull and superstructure are due to be joined in October 2021, and she was launched in 2023.

== Lusine ==
In February 2022 Heesen launched its 60-metre steel and aluminium yacht Lusine featuring exterior lines by Omega Architects and an intricate interior design from Sinot Yacht Architecture and Design. The yacht presented the Heesen design and engineering teams with several challenges, including installing a launching ramp for the Boston Whaler tender kept in the aft garage, and being the first yacht in the world to sport a selective catalytic reduction (SCR) system on MTU’s V12 engines. The yard’s interior team also faced one of the most complex interiors they have yet crafted with a unique combination of materials. The 1,060 GT vessel features a touch-and-go helipad; on sea trials she easily reached her contracted speed of 17.5 knots and she boasts a 4,200-mile range at 13 knots.

== Project Cosmos ==
In 2019 Heesen began construction on its largest project to date, the 80.07-metre (262.7 ft) Project Cosmos. Designed with fast efficient cruising in mind, Cosmos draws on several innovative technologies to achieve a top speed close to 30 knots and an efficient cruising speed of over 20 knots. Her FDHF hull combines with all-aluminium construction to deliver the light weight needed to achieve her design speeds, but this also necessitated the development of a new construction technique in order to ensure the required structural strength. As a result, Heesen developed the Backbone – a now patented design element – which acts as a stiffening element running fore to aft.

The project also features Rolls-Royce's Promas system in which the rudder and propeller are integrated into a single unit, which improves hydrodynamic efficiency. The Promas system for Cosmos has been developed and refined by Rolls-Royce at its Hydrodynamic Research Centre (HRC) in Kristinehamn, Sweden, with the optimal design being proved on 1:11 scale model testing at the HRC.

In July 2020 the hull and superstructure were joined, showing the sleek profile design – which was created by British studio Winch Design – for the first time in the flesh. At the same time, the four-engine, two-gearbox propulsion system, as well as the Promas units, were also fitted. Project Cosmos was delivered as Genesis in August 2023.

== Innovation, research and development ==
The Wolfson Unit test tank facility compared the FDHF hull to other round bilge hull forms between a cruising speed of 15 knots and almost planing speeds 44 knots, stating that ‘…the design is currently ranked as the most efficient in the Wolfson Unit's database’. The first yacht to feature the FDHF hull was Heesen Yachts’ 65-metre (213 ft) Galactica Star, which was launched in 2013 to wide acclaim. Several other Heesen builds have since featured the FDHF hull, including the 55-metre (180 ft) Azamanta, delivered in 2015, which was the first steel-hulled FDHF yacht over 50 metres in length.

More recent Heesen innovations include the 2017-delivered superyacht Home, a 50-metre (164 ft) yacht that combines both the FDHF hull and an advanced hybrid propulsion system for the first time. Fitted with two 127 kW DC electric shaft motors alongside twin conventional diesel engines, she has registered a fuel consumption of just 45 litres per hour in hybrid mode at 9 knots.

Heesen Yachts has also collaborated with Van Oossanen on the implementation of the naval architect's Hull Vane system, a stern-mounted, underwater fixed foil that aims to improve both fuel saving and seakeeping. The first superyacht to feature a Hull Vane was Heesen's Alive, a 42-metre (138 ft) yacht delivered in 2014 which also features an FDHF hull. Sea trials showed that the yacht was 35 per cent more efficient than any other yacht of her size, with fuel consumption estimated to be 30 per cent less than a conventional displacement yacht.

Further innovations have also been implemented on Project Cosmos, at 80 metres Heesen's largest project to date. These include the patented Backbone used to add stiffness to the lightweight aluminium construction, and the use of the Rolls-Royce Promas system that integrates propeller and rudder into a single unit.

== Shipyard ==
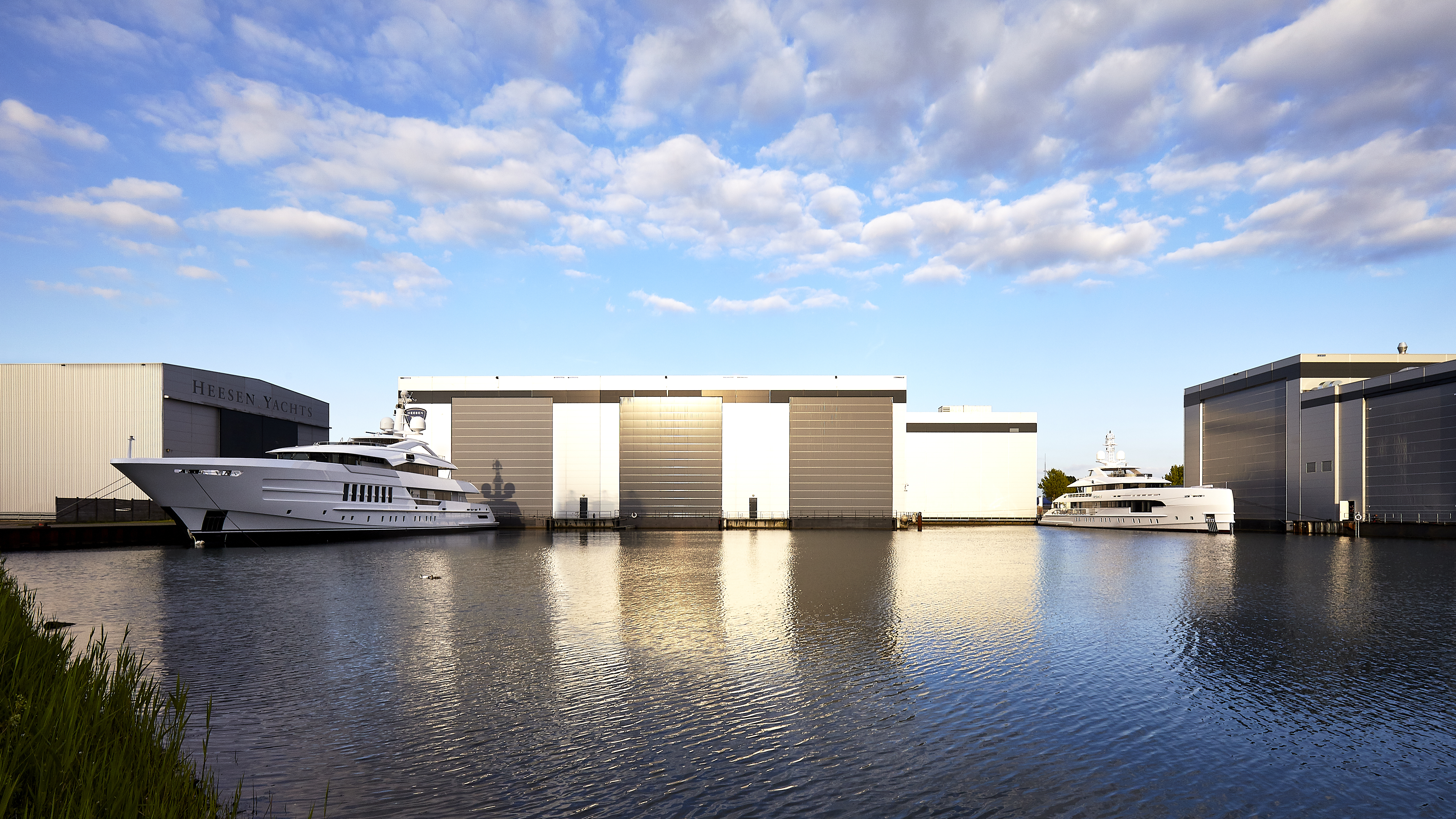
The Heesen Yachts yard in Oss, The Netherlands

The Heesen Yachts shipyard is situated in the southern Netherlands town of Oss. Covering 4.4 acres, the yard comprises nine construction sheds and five dry docks. A new construction facility was developed in 2003, and this was further enhanced in 2015 when work began on a new 85-metre (279 ft) dry dock and 90-metre (295 ft) construction hall on the site of sheds 2 and 3, which were originally built in 1985. Work on the new dry dock and construction hall was completed in September 2016. The yard now has the capability to build yachts up to 83 metres (272 ft) in length. In addition, Heesen has its own interiors construction department based in the nearby town of Winterswijk. Following recent expansion, the Winterswijk production area now covers 8,100 square metres, allowing the yard to cater for the increasing size of yacht it is building and the increasing number of orders under construction.

== Economic Impact ==
With 500 permanent employees on its payroll and with 1,000 staff (including subcontractors and agency workers) in the yard on a typical day, Heesen is one of the top five employers in the city and municipality of Oss in southeastern Holland.

The company’s 2020 revenue of €200 million was the highest in Heesen’s history to date (as of June 2021), and most of this is passed back into the local community and regional and national economies due to most elements of the yachts constructed being produced in-house or sourced in The Netherlands. This includes inhouse naval architecture and engineering; inhouse construction of aluminium hulls; and inhouse installation and finishing of everything from the mechanical elements to the interiors, which are also built by Heesen at its Winterswijk facility. Externally subcontracted elements include specialist disciplines such as hull painting, and the construction of steel hulls which are produced in Friesland, northeastern Holland.

Economic flow-through also includes extensive use of local services, from hotels and longer term accommodations for owners, their representatives, yacht crews and the international media, to caterers, musicians and other local tradespeople for elements such as launch and dedication parties which can often comprise guest lists well into the hundreds.

Heesen is a member of several local and regional business and networking groups, and supports a variety of local causes. Heesen sponsors both the local rowing club in Oss and also TOP Oss, the city’s professional football club that currently competes in the Dutch Eerste Divisie and which plays its home games in the Frans Heesen Stadion.

== Panama Papers ==
In 2017, Heesen Yachts made headlines when the company was associated with the Panama Papers. One of the company's yachts, the Galactica Star, was found to have been bought in 2013 by the Nigerian oil magnate Kola Aluko. This was done through Earnshaw Associates ltd, a company based in the British Virgin Islands, which also appeared in the Panama Papers. Heesen Yachts denied having sold the yacht directly to Aluko or Earnshaw. It did not disclose to whom or which company Heesen sold the yacht in June 2013.

== Death of employee ==
On April 6, 2017, a company employee was found unconscious in the bow of a ship under construction. The man was welding alone in the lower tip of the keel. He later died in hospital from the effects of inhaling the noble gas argon.

In 2021, the Dutch Openbaar Ministerie announced that it would prosecute Heesen Yachts. According to the prosecutors, the shipbuilder could have prevented the death of the employee by better ventilating the room where the employee was working. Heesen denied this allegation, claiming that there was adequate ventilation.

In April 2021, Heesen Yachts was found guilty by the judge. The company had to pay a fine of 100,000 euros, and was given a further 25,000 euros probation. It also had to have an article published in trade journals stating that the company had not properly guaranteed the safety of its employees.

== War in Ukraine ==
In 2008, the shipyard was acquired by Russian entrepreneur Vagit Alekperov. In the years following the takeover, the company grew from a family business to a global player in the yacht industry. Following the 2022 Russian invasion of Ukraine, many Western governments placed rich Russians who have, or are perceived to have ties with President Vladimir Putin, on a sanctions list. Alekperov was not placed on the sanctions lists of the European Union, but he sold Heesen Yachts to an independent Dutch foundation for an undisclosed amount.

== Yachts ==
Below is a list of all the yachts built by Heesen:

== See also ==
- Heesen Yachts Stadion
- Motor yacht
- List of motor yachts by length
- List of yachts built by Heesen

== Miscellaneous ==
- In 2020, one of Heesen Yachts' yachts, the Cosmos, was recreated in Lego. More than 12,000 stones were used for this.
