= Leonid Fedun =

Russian billionaire businessman

- Леонид Федун
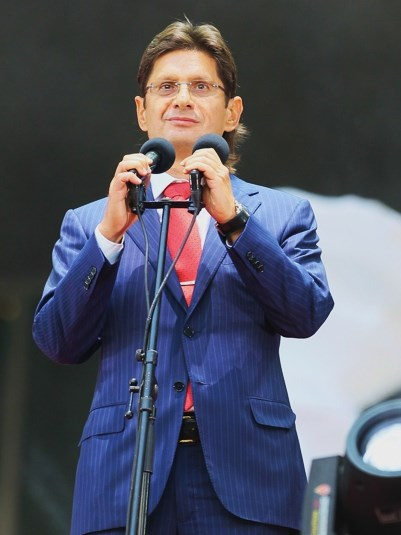
- Fedun in 2014
- Born: Leonid Arnoldovich Fedun; 5 April 1956 (age 70); Kiev, Ukrainian SSR, Soviet Union (now Ukraine)
- Occupation: Businessman
- Spouse: Married
- Awards: Order "For Merit to the Fatherland" (3rd and 4th class); Order of Honour

Leonid Arnoldovich Fedun (Russian: Леонид Арнольдович Федун. Born 5 April 1956) is a Ukrainian-born Russian billionaire businessman known for co-founding Russian oil company Lukoil. Until retiring in 2022, Fedun was vice president of Lukoil. He formerly served as president of FC Spartak Moscow before selling 100% of his shares to Lukoil.

Prior to entering the private sector, he was a military officer. He is considered to be a close associate of Vagit Alekperov, who he co-founded Lukoil with.

On February 18, 2022, Fedun was estimated to have had an estimated fortune of $8.5 billion, a figure that declined to $1.7 billion by March 28, 2022. Critics have labelled Fedun as an oligarch.

== Education ==
Leonid Fedun was born in Kyiv in 1956, but grew up in Baikonur, as his father was sent as a military surgeon. He finished School No. 1 in Baikonur and pursued a military career. In 1977, he graduated from the Military-Political Department of the Rostov Higher Military Command School. Later, he entered post-graduate education in the Dzerzhinsky Military Academy. In 1984, he obtained a Ph.D. with a thesis on the public opinion of military servants as the component of army morale.

From 1984 to 1992 he taught sociology at the academy and rose to the rank of colonel. In 1993, he completed a post-graduate course in the Higher School of Privatization and Entrepreneurship. Since 1995, he has been a member of the Russian Academy of Natural Sciences.

== Career ==
In addition to his work at the Academy, Fedun was a lecturer in the Znanie organization. In 1987, he visited Kogalym with a lecture, was introduced to the management of production company Kogalymneftegaz, and got a job offer from its director Vagit Alekperov.

In 1990, Alekperov was appointed as the deputy minister of oil and gas industry and invited Fedun to Moscow. In 1992, Alekperov left the public service and created a LangepasUraiKogalymneft concern which included companies working on the largest oil pools in Langepas, Urai, and Kogalym regions. In 1993, this company was transformed into LUKoil. From 1992 to 1994, Fedun was the founder and CEO of Neftkonsult (which later became LUKoil-Consulting) consulting firm and Lukoil Reserve Invest (which became the core of the IFD Kapital Group) oil brokerage company. In 1995, he was appointed the vice-president of LUKoil.

In 1993, Fedun was officially dismissed from the Russian military and within the same year became the CEO of JSC.

As of May 2006, Fedun was one of the main owners of IFD Kapital Group.

In 2020, he donated 10 million rubles to the Vishnevsky Institute of Surgery to the fight COVID-19.

== Sports ==
In 2004, Fedun became the second-largest shareholder and the president of FC Spartak Moscow (Fedun owned 32.7% while Alekperov owned 36.7%). According to the entrepreneur, by 2014, he invested nearly a billion dollars the club. Fedun remained the president of FC Spartak Moscow until 2022. Under his management, the club got a home stadium, Lukoil Arena, opened a football school, Spartak Academy, became a 2017 champion of Russia, won the 2017 Russian Super Cup and the 2021–22 Russian Cup. On August 22, 2022, Leonid Fedun resigned as president of FC Spartak Moscow, selling 100% of his shares to Lukoil.

In July 2021, Fedun made a £400 million offer to purchase the English Premier League club Wolverhampton Wanderers, which was rejected.

== Awards and honors ==
His business ventures have earned him numerous state awards (Order For Merit to the Fatherland of III and IV class, and the Order of Honour).

== Family ==
Fedun's father was Arnold Antonovich Fedun (1928-2021), the People's Doctor of the USSR, former chief surgeon of the RVSN, colonel of the medical service.

Fedun was married twice. He has two children with his first wife Marina Fedun: Anton (born 1985) and Ekaterina (born 1988) He also has five children with his second wife Zarema Salikhova: Leo, Lucas, Lavr, Adriana, and another daughter born in 2022.

== See also ==
- List of Russian billionaires
