= Andrew Rogers =

Andrew Rogers may refer to:

- Andrew Rogers (footballer) (born 1964), Australian rules soccer player
- Andrew Rogers (judge) (born 1933), Australian judge of the NSW Supreme Court
- Andrew Rogers (artist), Australian artist
- Andrew Rogers (singer)
- Andrew Rogers (journalist) (born 1962), British author and journalist living in Amsterdam
- Andrew J. Rogers (1828–1900), American politician
- Andy Rogers (ice hockey) (born 1986), ice hockey player
- Andy Rogers (footballer) (born 1956), English former soccer player

== See also ==
- Andy Rodgers (born 1983), soccer player
