= Vagit Alekperov =

Azerbaijani businessman (born 1950)

- Vahid Ələkbərov
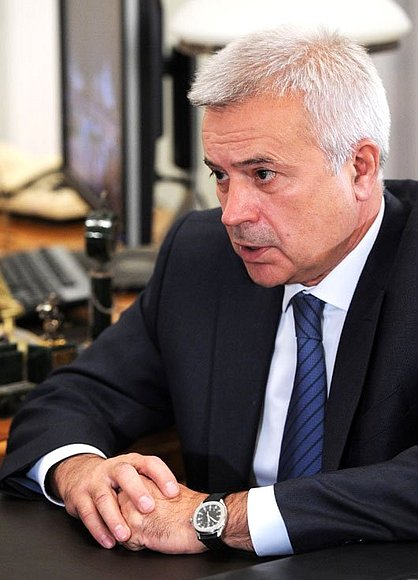
- Alekperov in 2013
- Born: 1 September 1950 (age 76); Baku, Azerbaijan SSR, Soviet Union
- Citizenship: Russia
- Education: Azerbaijan State Oil and Industry University , Master of Engineering
- Occupation: Chairman of the supervisory board of Basic Element Company
- Spouse: Larisa Victorovna Alekperova
- Children: 1
- Awards: Order "For Merit to the Fatherland" (2nd class); Order "For Merit to the Fatherland" (3rd class); Order "For Merit to the Fatherland" (4th class); Order of Friendship; Order of the Badge of Honour; Order Of The Madar Horseman (1st class); Order of the Crown (Commander); Shohrat Order; Order of Friendship (2nd class)

Vagit Yusufovich Alekperov (Azerbaijani: Vahid Yusifoviç Ələkbərov, Russian: Вагит Юсуфович Алекперов; born 1 September 1950) is a Russian businessman of Azerbaijani origin and an oligarch. He was the president of the oil company Lukoil from 1993 until 2022.

As of March 2026, according to the Forbes magazine, Alekperov has an estimated net worth of US$29.5 billion, making him the third-wealthiest person in Russia and the eighty-first in the world. According to the Bloomberg Billionaires Index—dated 24 August 2026—Alekperov is positioned fifth among Russian billionaires and 125th globally, with a net worth of US$21.0 billion. The index records a year-to-date contraction of US$1.63 billion. Alekperov previously owned a 36.8% stake in football club Spartak Moscow. Fellow former Spartak owner Leonid Fedun is Alekperov's close associate. Alekperov also owned superyacht builder Heesen Yachts until 2022.

As part of the international governmental responses to the Russian invasion of Ukraine, the United Kingdom, Canada, Australia and New Zealand have imposed sanctions against Alekperov.

== Biography ==
Alekperov was born on 1 September 1950, in Baku, Azerbaijan SSR, one of the earliest centers of the international petroleum industry. His father, who died when Vagit was a boy, worked in the oilfields all his life and inspired Alekperov to follow in his footsteps. Alekperov's father was an Azerbaijani Muslim, and his mother was Russian Orthodox. Alekperov is religious, but does not define himself as either Muslim or Orthodox.

In 1974, Alekperov graduated from the Azerbaijan Oil and Chemistry Institute with a Master of Science in Engineering.

=== Western Siberia ===
Alekperov moved to Western Siberia in 1979 and worked at Surgutneftegaz between 1979 and 1985, earning his reputation as an industry expert. He was ascending positions and by 1985 became the first deputy general director of Bashneft production company. In 1987, he became general director of the newly created production company Kogalymneftegaz.

=== Moscow ===
In 1990, Alekperov was appointed deputy minister of the Oil and Gas Industry of the Soviet Union and became the youngest deputy energy minister in Soviet history. At that time, Alekperov promoted the establishment of vertically integrated state-owned energy companies, which would bring together the wide range of organizations in the energy sector that were, at the time, reporting to different Soviet bureaucratic institutions.

At this time, Western oil companies began actively seeking partners in Russia. During a visit to British Petroleum facilities in the United Kingdom in 1990, Alekperov personally headed the Russian delegation at the negotiations. Rondo Fehlberg, an executive at BP, told NY Times that Alekperov took control of the agenda during that 1990 trip, sternly asking the BP executives to explain how a modern oil company should be set up.

=== LUKoil ===
In April 1993, Langepas-Uray-Kogalymneft became the joint-stock company LUKOIL, and Alekperov became its president and chairman of the board. By 2002, Alekperov owned 10.4% of the company.

In 2000, Alekperov resigned as head of the board of directors of Lukoil, but retained his position as president of the company. In May 2008, Alekperov bought 11.13 million shares (1.3%) in Lukoil, thereby increasing his stake to 20.4% and becoming the company's largest shareholder. (Note: During at least three meetings in Turkey and London in 2014 and 2015, executives associated with Alekperov's firm Lukoil allegedly questioned persons at the Alexander Nix associated firms SCL Group, which is closely associated with Aleksandr Kogan, and Cambridge Analytica, which is closely associated with Steve Bannon, who supported Donald Trump's 2016 campaign for President of the United States, and Robert Mercer, who supported Ted Cruz's campaign for President of the United States, about how United States election data about American voters could be used to target them according to Christopher Wylie.)

LUKoil was the first Russian company to acquire an American company. In November 2000, LUKoil acquired Getty Petroleum Marketing and its 1,300 gas stations in the United States Like many other Russian oligarchs, Alekperov has also moved into banking and media. In May 2006 Alekperov was one of the two main owners of IFD Kapital Group.

During at least three meetings in Turkey and London in 2014 and 2015, executives associated with Alekperov's firm Lukoil allegedly questioned persons at the Alexander Nix associated firms SCL Group, which is closely associated with Aleksandr Kogan, and Cambridge Analytica, which is closely associated with Steve Bannon, who supported Donald Trump's 2016 campaign for President of the United States, and Robert Mercer, who supported Ted Cruz's campaign for President of the United States, about how United States election data about American voters could be used to target them according to Christopher Wylie.

In 2018, Alekperov first mentioned in an interview that he was looking for a successor to his position, stating that a staff reshuffle could take place at the company in 2023.

Alekperov is on the 2017 list of Russian "oligarchs" named in the CAATSA unclassified report to the U.S. Congress.

=== International sanctions ===
In April 2022, following Russia's invasion of Ukraine, Alekperov was sanctioned by Australia and the United Kingdom. On 21 April, Lukoil issued a statement saying that Alekperov had stepped down and resigned from the board of directors after 29 years.

In May 2022, Canada also imposed sanctions on Alekperov. In October 2022, New Zealand sanctioned Alekperov.

== Scientific Activity ==
While already serving as the head of Lukoil, Vagit Alekperov defended a dissertation entitled “The Formation of Conditions and the Ensuring Sustainable Development of Vertically Integrated Oil Companies,” using the enterprise he headed as a case study, and in 1998 he was awarded the degree of Doctor of Economic Sciences. In the same year, two of his books were published.

In 2014, Alekperov was awarded the title of Honorary Professor of Volgograd State University.

Vagit Alekperov is also a full member of the Russian Academy of Natural Sciences.

=== Author of the following books ===
- Vertically Integrated Oil Companies of Russia: Methodology of Formation and Implementation. Moscow, 1996;
- Strategic Directions of Systemic Reorganization of Management in Oil Companies (Using OAO LUKOIL as an Example). Moscow, 1998;
- Oil of Russia: Past, Present, and Future. Moscow, 2011.

== Personal life ==
Alekperov is married to Larisa Victorovna Alekperova and has a son, Yusuf, born in 1990. In 2023 he founded the WellTech company, which is engaged in the repair of LUKOIL wells.

Alekperov's hobby is numismatics. The exact composition of his collection is unknown, but according to some reports, it is one of the three largest private collections in Russia. In 2015, Alperov established a private Museum of Numismatics in the Zinoviev-Yusupov chambers in Moscow. It has more than 700 coins on display, about a quarter of the entire collection. The exposition consists of gold, silver, and platinum coins minted in Classical antiquity, the Byzantine Empire, the European Middle Ages, the Russian Empire, and the USSR.

== Philanthropy ==
In 2007, Alekperov founded The Foundation "Our Future" to promote social entrepreneurship in Russia.

Alekperov has repeatedly stated publicly and has confirmed that, according to his will, his stake in Lukoil (over 20% of the company) will be transferred to a specially created charitable foundation.

In 2020 coronavirus pandemic, Lukoil has donated more than RUB 652 million in 22 Russian regions and almost $900 000 dollars in its operation countries abroad. Alekperov also donated RUB 50 million of personal finances to fight coronavirus in the Republic of Komi.

== Awards and honorary titles ==
Alekperov was the first Russian citizen to receive the Woodrow Wilson Award. He was honored in 2005 for achievements in corporate citizenship.

On 31 August 2020, ahead of Vagit Alekperov's 70th jubilee, Azerbaijani President Ilham Aliyev awarded him with the "Dostlug" Order for his special services rendered to the development of mutual relations between Azerbaijan and the Russian Federation.

On 4 May 2022, Alekperov received the Order "For Merit to the Fatherland" of the first degree for "great contribution to the development of the fuel and energy complex and many years of diligent work".

Vagit Alekperov is also a full member of the Russian Academy of Natural Sciences.

== Forbes net worth and rankings ==
In the 2026 Forbes ranking, Alekperov ranked third among Russian billionaires and 81st globally, with an estimated net worth of US$29.5 billion, an increase of US$0.8 billion from the previous year. Although his wealth increased, he lost the position as Russia's richest billionaire that he had held for the previous two years. Forbes continued to identify oil and investments as the principal sources of his wealth, with his fortune primarily associated with his stake in Lukoil. Alekperov received nearly US$2.4 billion in Lukoil dividends in 2025. In October 2025, Lukoil was placed under United States sanctions, after which the company announced plans to sell its international business.

In 2025, Alekperov remained the richest Russian billionaire for the second consecutive year and ranked 62nd globally, with an estimated net worth of US$28.7 billion. His fortune was almost unchanged from US$28.6 billion in 2024, and he narrowly remained ahead of Alexey Mordashov, whose wealth was estimated at US$28.6 billion, and Leonid Mikhelson, at US$28.4 billion. Forbes reported that Alekperov received more than US$2 billion in Lukoil dividends in 2024.

In 2024, Alekperov became the richest Russian billionaire in the Forbes ranking for the first time. He advanced from sixth place in Russia in 2023 to first place, while his global position improved from 80th to 59th. His estimated net worth rose from US$20.5 billion to US$28.6 billion, an augmentation of approximately US$8.1 billion. The shift represented a marked restoration of his financial standing after the sharp contraction recorded two years earlier. His wealth remained primarily connected to Lukoil, in which Forbes reported a 28.3% stake as of September 2021, and Alekperov also received nearly US$2 billion in Lukoil dividends in 2023.

In 2023, Alekperov recovered to sixth place among Russian billionaires and 80th globally, with an estimated net worth of US$20.5 billion. This was almost twice the US$10.5 billion estimated in 2022 and therefore represented a substantial reversal of the previous year's decline. Forbes continued to classify oil and investments as the principal sources of his wealth, and it also noted that Alekperov had stepped down as president of Lukoil in April 2022, several days after the United Kingdom imposed sanctions on him. He nevertheless received approximately US$2.2 billion in Lukoil dividends in 2022, and this income remained material to the reconstruction of his fortune.

In 2022, Alekperov fell to tenth place among Russian billionaires and 188th globally, as his net worth declined to US$10.5 billion from US$24.9 billion in 2021, a decrease of US$14.4 billion. Forbes listed his principal asset as a 28.3% stake in Lukoil and reported that he had received nearly US$1.5 billion in dividends from the company in 2021.

In 2021, Alekperov ranked fourth among Russian billionaires and 66th globally, with an estimated net worth of US$24.9 billion, an increase of US$9.7 billion from the previous year. Forbes attributed his wealth to oil and investments and listed his 29.7% stake in Lukoil as his principal asset. He received approximately US$1.1 billion in Lukoil dividends for 2020. Forbes also noted that Lukoil had cancelled 57.1 million of its own shares in 2019–2020, reducing its share capital by 7.6%.

Vagit Alekperov's wealth and Forbes rankings, 2004–2026
Year	Net worth (US$ billion)	Global rank	Rank in Russia	Change (US$ billion)
2026	29.5	81	3	+0.8
2025	28.7	62	1	+0.1
2024	28.6	59	1	+8.1
2023	20.5	80	6	+10.0
2022	10.5	188	10	−14.4
2021	24.9	66	4	+9.7
2020	15.2	65	5	−5.5
2019	20.7	47	3	+4.3
2018	16.4	78	4	+1.9
2017	14.5	74	6	+5.6
2016	8.9	124	9	−3.3
2015	12.2	96	6	−1.4
2014	13.6	76	7	−1.2
2013	14.8	55	5	+1.3
2012	13.5	56	5	−0.4
2011	13.9	50	8	+3.3
2010	10.6	58	6	+2.8
2009	7.8	57	3	−5.2
2008	13.0	56	9	+0.6
2007	12.4	48	8	+1.4
2006	11.0	37	2	+6.7
2005	4.3	122	10	+1.6
2004	2.7	186	10	—

'Notes: Net worth and global rank refer to Forbes' annual World's Billionaires list. Rank in Russia refers to Forbes Russia's annual national ranking, which may use a different valuation date.'

== See also ==
- List of Azerbaijanis
- List of Russian billionaires
