= List of yachts built by Heesen =

This is a list of all the yachts built by Heesen Yachts, sorted by year.

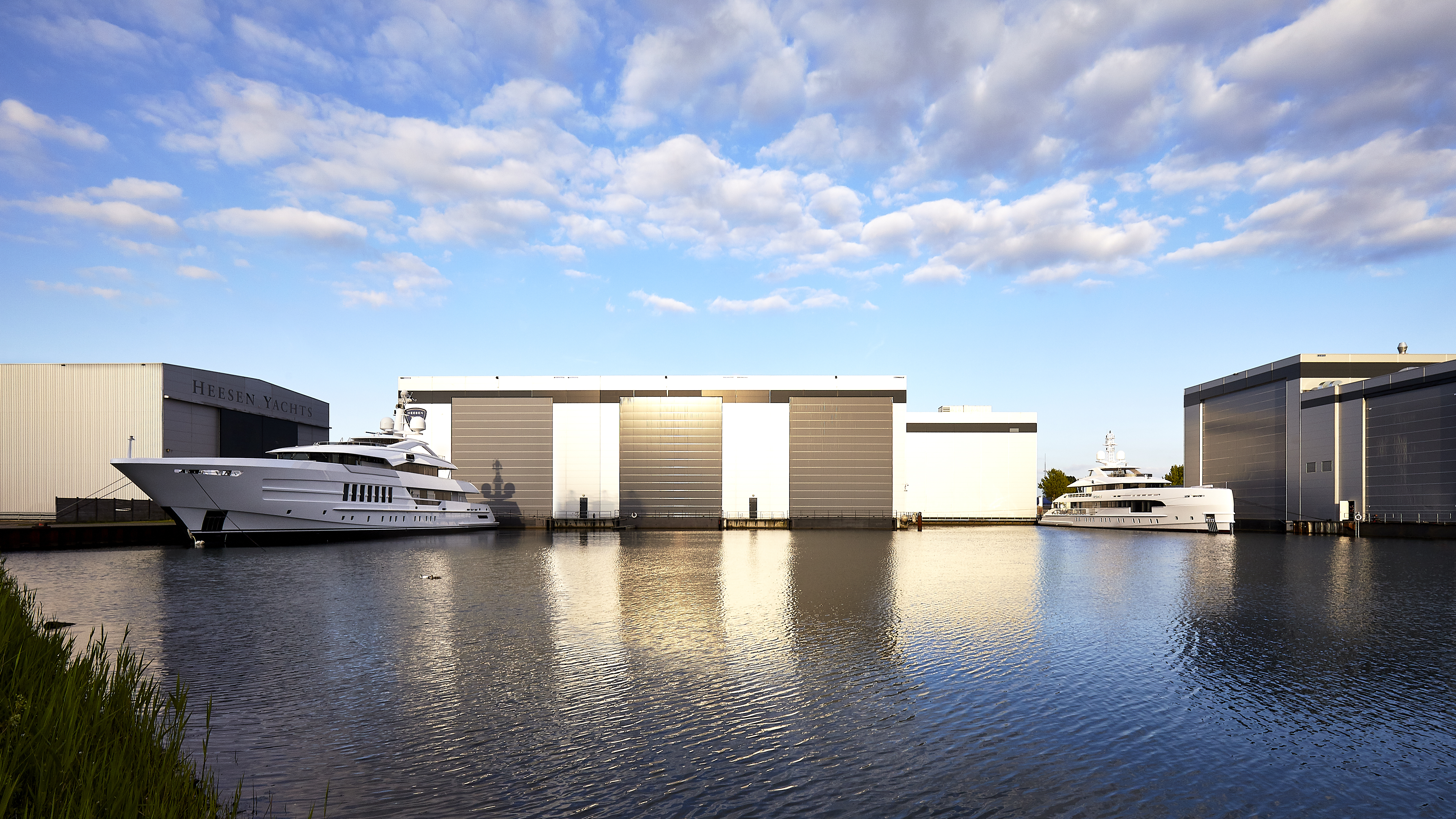
The Heesen Yachts yard in Oss, The Netherlands

Was the longest yacht upon completion.

== 1983–1999 ==
Year	Length overall		Name	Reference
Year	meters	feet	Name	Reference
1983	31.70	104.0	Oryx of London	
1986	36.60	120.1	Brio	
1987	39.32	129.0	Lionshare	
1987	34.14	112.0	Printemps	
1988	43.58	143.0	Octopussy 007	
1988	32.18	105.6	Lady Arlene	
1989	28.10	92.2	Heartbeat Of Life	
1990	44.20	145.0	At Last	
1990	31.50	103.3	Darwina	
1991	40.25	132.1	Mirage	
1991	32	105	El Lobo	
1992	37.79	124.0	Magix	
1993	40.23	132.0	Brazil	
1994	42.10	138.1	Life Saga	
1994	41.04	134.6	Ladyship	
1995	36.77	120.6	Sun Ark	
1995	36.75	120.6	Pandion	
1996	43.14	141.5	Harbour Moon	
1997	35	115	Opus II	
1998	47.65	156.3	Blue Magic	
1999	47	154	You & Me	
1999	39.10	128.3	Red Sapphire I	

== 2000–2009 ==
Year	Length overall		Name	Image	Reference
Year	meters	feet	Name	Image	Reference
2000	34.84	114.3	Alcor		
2000	30.66	100.6	Ammoun of London		
2000	30.70	100.7	Pokrov II		
2001	39.80	130.6	Happy T		
2001	39.40	129.3	Lady Azul		
2001	37.70	123.7	Unexpected		
2002	36.50	119.8	Duke Town		
2002	40.18	131.8	Mac Brew		
2002	34.50	113.2	Serenity D		
2003	30	98	Amigo		
2003	44.40	145.7	Kijo		
2003	46	151	Kinglouis		
2004	43.90	144.0	Bilmar		
2004	36.30	119.1	Clia		
2004	46.70	153.2	Yalla		
2005	36.80	120.7	Hashtag		
2005	32.16	105.5	Karyatis		
2005	36.80	120.7	Let It Be M		
2005	36.80	120.7	Man of Steel		
2005	43.60	143.0	The Lady K		
2006	37.30	122.4	Buka U		
2006	37.30	122.4	G Force		
2006	37.3	122	L'Equinox		
2006	47	154	Let It Be		
2006	47	154	Sirocco		
2007	44.17	144.9	Bliss		
2007	37.30	122.4	Her Destiny		
2007	49.71	163.1	Red Sapphire		
2007	44.17	144.9	Sedation		
2007	46.70	153.2	Mon Plaisir		
2008	44.17	144.9	Agram		
2008	47	154	Celestial Hope		
2008	44	144	G3		
2008	50	160	Inception		
2008	46.70	153.2	Raasta		
2009	47	154	4You		
2009	46.70	153.2	Blind Date		
2009	44	144	Jems		
2009	44	144	Lady Lara		

== 2010–2019 ==
Year	Length overall		Name	Image	Reference
Year	meters	feet	Name	Image	Reference
2010	37.30	122.4	Perle Noire		
2010	46.70	153.2	Ria		
2010	44	144	S. Bernardo		
2010	50.50	165.7	Sky		
2011	36.80	120.7	Aurelia		
2011	47	154	Crystalady		
2011	55	180	Quite Essential		
2011	49.80	163.4	Rocket		
2011	49.80	163.4	Knight		
2012	55	180	Lady JJ		
2012	46.70	153.2	Odyssea		
2012	35	115	Galactica Plus		
2012	44.77	146.9	Lady L		
2012	46.70	153.2	My Secret		
2013	50	160	Crazy Me		
2013	65	213	Galactica Star		
2013	49.80	163.4	Ventura		
2014	42.40	139.1	Alive		
2014	47	154	Elena		
2014	49.80	163.4	Hayken		
2014	51.10	167.7	MySky		
2014	40	130	Taurica		
2015	49.60	162.7	Ann G		
2015	47	154	Asya		
2015	55	180	Azamanta		
2015	49.90	163.7	Sibelle		
2016	45	148	Amore Mio		
2016	70.07	229.9	Galactica Super Nova		
2016	49.80	163.4	My Loyalty		
2017	46.70	153.2	Book Ends		
2017	49.80	163.4	Home		
2017	55	180	Laurentia		
2018	51	167	Irisha		
2018	49.80	163.4	Van Tom		
2018	49.80	163.4	White		
2018	50	160	Omaha		
2019	55	180	Vida		
2019	49.8	163	Masa		
2019	56	184	Galvas		
2019	49.8	163	Erica		

== 2020–present ==
Year	Length overall		Name	Image	Reference
Year	meters	feet	Name	Image	Reference
2020	49.8	163	Amare II		
2020	49.9	164	Arkadia		
2020	55	180	Solemates		
2021	55	180	Moskito		
2021	50	160	Aquamarine		
2021	49.8	163	Ela		
2022	60	200	Lusine		
2022	49.9	164	Ocean Z		
2022	50	160	Book Ends		
2023	80.07	262.7	Genesis		
2023	55	180	Reliance		
2023	59	194	Ultra G		
2023	67	220	Sparta		
2023	49.9	164	Cinderella Noel IV		
2024	55	180	Iris Blue		

== Under construction ==
Planned delivery	Length overall		Name	Reference
Planned delivery	meters	feet	Name	Reference
2023	50	160	Project Jade	
2024	56.7	186	Project Akira	
2024	55	180	Project Serena	
2025	55	180	Project Venus	
2025	50	160	Project Orion	
2026	57	187	Project Setteesettanta	
2026	50	160	Project Sophia	

== See also ==
- List of motor yachts by length
- Luxury yacht
- Lürssen
