= Frans Heesen Stadion =

Multi-use stadium in the Netherlands

- het Osse Kuipje
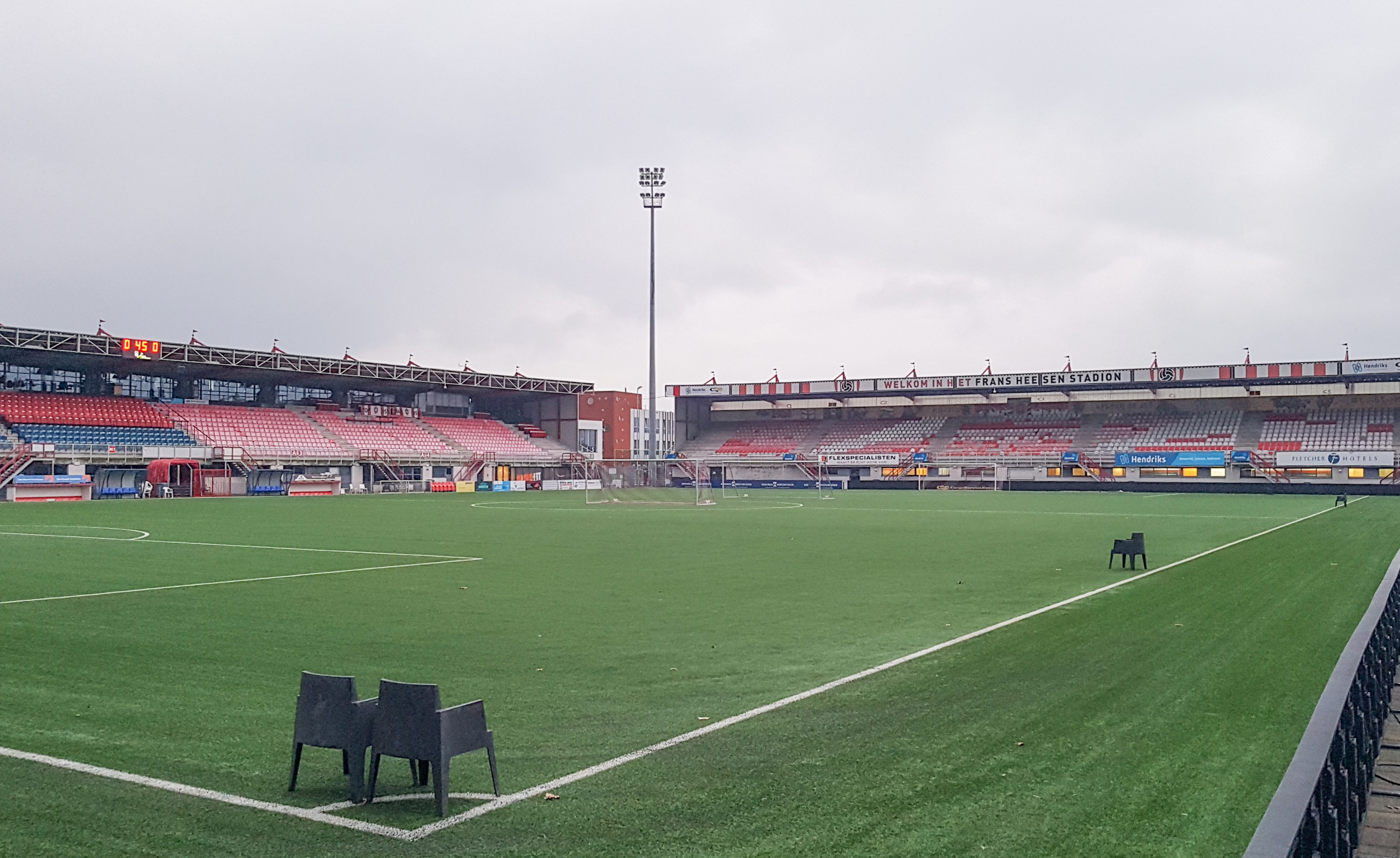
- Interactive map of Frans Heesen Stadion
- Full name: Frans Heesen Stadion
- Former names: TOP Oss Stadion (1946–present); Heesen Yachts Stadion (1997–2011); Frans Heesen Stadion (2011–present)
- Location: Mondriaanlaan 4; 5342 CN Oss
- Coordinates: 51°45′18″N 5°31′41″E
- Owner: TOP Oss
- Capacity: 4,561
- Surface: Artificial turf
- Field size: 105 by 68 metres (114.8 yd × 74.4 yd)

Construction
- Opened: 1946
- Renovated: 1997–2000, 2010–2016
- Cost: ƒ 13 million

Tenants
- TOP Oss (1946–present); Netherlands under-21 (2009–present)

Frans Heesen Stadion is a multi-use stadium in the city of Oss, Netherlands. It is currently used mostly for association football matches and is the home stadium of TOP Oss. The stadium is able to hold 4,561 spectators.

== History ==
Founded in 1928, TOP Oss was given its own sports park for the first time in 1930, namely on Molenstraat. In 1946, the club moved to the Heescheweg. Since then, TOP has been playing at the same ground. Due to municipal redevelopment of the area, the address later became the Mondriaanlaan and is now located on the Nelson Mandelaboulevard.

As the club achieved increasing success, so did public interest also grow. As a result, the main ground was gradually expanded with stands. For example, during the club's first professional adventure in the 1950s, TOP attracted an average of more than 5,000 spectators. Before the first major renovation, the club had a covered main grandstand as well as terracing which was covered on the sides. At the late 1990s, a major renovation project started, which first replaced the main stand and later two other stands. During this period, the stadium became known as first TOP Oss Stadion and later Heesen Yachts Stadion.

From 1 August 2011, it was named after Frans Heesen, the founder of the former main sponsor Heesen Yachts, as a tribute to the company, who at their own request no longer wanted to tie their name to the TOP Oss Stadion.

In 2010, a new renovation plan was started under the name Talentencampus Oss. This project was finalised in 2016. The result of this was that a school was built on the site of the "missing" grandstand. In addition, the main building and the surrounding sports park were thoroughly renovated. The natural grass of the pitch was also replaced by an artificial turf surface during this renovation.

== Structure and facilities ==
The stadium consists of three stands, with one part behind the goal being "open". The site of a secondary school, Hooghuis Stadion, is located on this spot. The stadium has undergone several changes over the years. This makes has made it a multi-functional complex with a swimming pool, fitness center, indoor sports arena, restaurant and hotel, a business club, and 6 sky boxes.

Under the stand on the short side is also the supporter home Dikke Piet. This grandstand also houses the club building of the amateur branch of TOP Oss (SV TOP), which was completed in 2016.

== Matches ==
Frans Heesen Stadion has once been used as home ground for the Netherlands national under-21 team:

| Date | | Result | | Competition |
|---|---|---|---|---|
| 12 February 2009 | Netherlands U21 | 4–1 | Greece U21 | Friendly |
