= IFD Kapital Group =

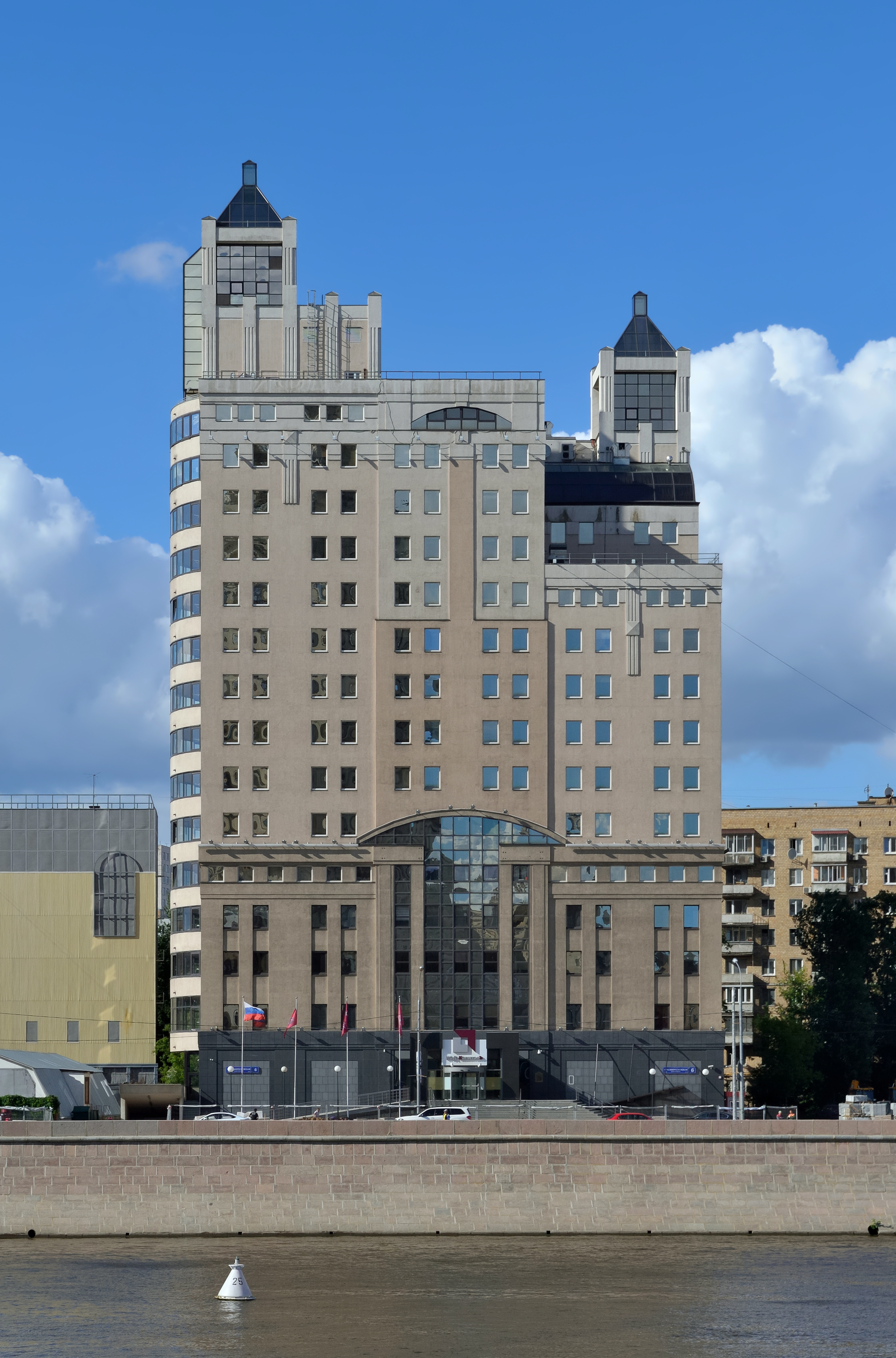
- IFD Kapital Group Headquarters, Krasnopresnenskaya Embankment 6, Moscow
- Formerly: IFD Capital Financial Group
- Industry: financial services holding company
- Founded: 2003; 23 years ago
- Headquarters: Moscow, Russia
- Key people: Vagit Alekperov (CEO); Leonid Fedun (Deputy Chief Executive)
- Services: investment banking brokerage services
- Divisions: asset management business; Petrocommerce banking group; media and information technology; real estate
- Website: ifdk.com

IFD Kapital Group, formerly known as IFD Capital Financial Group, is a Russian financial holding company founded in 2003 from LUKoil non-oil assets, based in Moscow. With assets exceeding US$14.7 billion and total shareholders’ funds of 7.5 billion US$ as of 2012, it ranked among the top-100 largest Russian companies by volume of proceeds, according to ratings of Expert-400 and finance500.com. As of 2013, it had a triple A rating with a Russian rating agency.

== History ==
The origin of IFD Kapital Group are with the Russian oil giant LUKoil. In the beginning of 2003, LUKoil split off 3 billion US$ of non-oil or non-core assets, which started IFD Kapital Group: LUKoil's insurance business and pension fund LUKoil-Garant. LUKoil's deputy chief executive Leonid Fedun became IFD Kapital's first chair. In April 2003, IFD Kapital Group agreed to buy brokerage LUKoil-Reserve-Invest, and the sale was completed in January 2004. In the spring of 2003, IFD Kapital Group also bought JSC Capital Investment Group, which had started within LUKOIL Reserve-Invest about 7 years earlier. In June 2004 IFD Kapital group bought LUKoil's majority stake in the mid-sized bank Petrocommerce, Open joint-stock company (OJSC), which had been founded in 1992, and it sold it in 2013 to Otkritie Financial Corp.

By 2004, IDF Kapital Group was owned by a closed-end fund called Strategic Investments, with unknown owners, managed by 'Management-Center', and Igor Sherkunov as chairman of the board of directors, a long term LUKoil insurance company man and member of LUKoil's board of directors.

In May 2006, the two main owners of IFD Kapital were reported to be Lukoil executives: CEO Vagit Alekperov and deputy chief executive Leonid Fedun.

== Services ==
IFD Kapital Group operates in investment banking and brokerage services, focusing on pension reserves and insurance reserves. The company manages non-state pension funds, closed-end real estate mutual funds, and various insurance products, including mandatory medical insurance. It manages 36 non-governmental pension funds (NPFs), including such major Russian funds as Blagosotoyanie a mandatory pension insurance in 80 regions of Russia, serving 2.9 million customers, assets of 6.5 billion euros, Gazfond, LUKOIL Garant, Norilsk Nickel, Sberbank, the government-owned Electric Power Industry fund, Promagrofond, KIT Finance Investment Bank, and others.

== Organization ==
IFD Kapital has four subdivisions: asset management business, Petrocommerce banking group, media and information technology and real estate. The corporate center of the Group coordinating the subdivisions is the "IFD Kapital” Integrated Private Investment Fund (IPIF).

=== Asset management business ===
The holding company 'Group Kapital Asset Management' CJSC was the second largest Russian asset management firm with over 230 billion rubles of assets in management, as of September 30, 2012 per company website. It comprises three companies, namely Kapital Asset Management Company LLC, Kapital Asset Management joint stock company (JSC) and Management Company Kapital Mutual Funds LLC. The holding is headed by Sergei Mikhailov, a member of the Board of Directors with numerous connections. The holding totaled assets of RUR 132.7 billion as of March 31, 2013.

=== Petrocommerce banking group ===
Petrocommerce OJSC, was established in 1992, and grew into the "Bank Petrocommerce Group" by incorporating Commercial Bank for Industry and Construction "Stavropolye" (Stavropolpromstroybank) Joint Stock Investment Company (JSC), Komi regional bank “Ukhtabank” (JSC Komiregionbank “Ukhtabank”) JSC, and “Bank Petrocommerce-Ukraine” public joint stock company, per Petrocommerce website. Moody's Investors Service rated Petrocommerce at Ba3/D-according to its international scale, and at Aa3.ruaccording to the national rating scale. Standard & Poor’s rated it B+/B according to international scale, and ruA according to national scale. The Russian rating agency 'Expert RA' gave it A+ and 'Rus-Rating' gave it BBB− according to international scale and AA− according to national scale, per IFD Kapital website. Petrocommerce was among the 20 biggest banks of the Russian Federation in 2007 and among the top 30 banks as of 2014. Investment bank Otkritie, Russia's second largest financial group by assets, bought Petrocommerce as of 31 October 2013. The new CEO since November 2013 is Vladimir Rykunov, former financial director and member of the executive board of Nomos bank.

=== Music broadcasting ===
The 'Russian Media Group' is a holding company of numerous Russian music radio stations (Русское Радио, Monte Carlo, Хит FM, DFM, радио MAXIMUM, TV channel RU.TV) being one of the largest Russian music media holdings. It also includes a defunct (as at May 2021) entertainment internet portal, www.muz.ru designed "for on-demand download of legal digital music and video".

=== Real estate ===
The real estate arm owns 3 Class A office buildings in Moscow, a sports center in the Sokolniki area, two hotel complexes in Russia and Ukraine, besides constructing a new stadium for the “Spartak” Football Club Moscow.

== Board of directors ==
As of 2014, Leonid Fedun is chairman of the board of directors. The four members are Aleksander Zhirkov, Sergey Mikhailov, Olga Plaksina and Vsevolod Gordyi, with Elena Ilynskaya as secretary of the board of directors per the company website

== Crimea-related sanctions ==
In June 2017, the company was sanctioned by the United States for taking ownership of the Riviera Sunrise hotel complex in Crimea.
