= Illusion (yacht) =

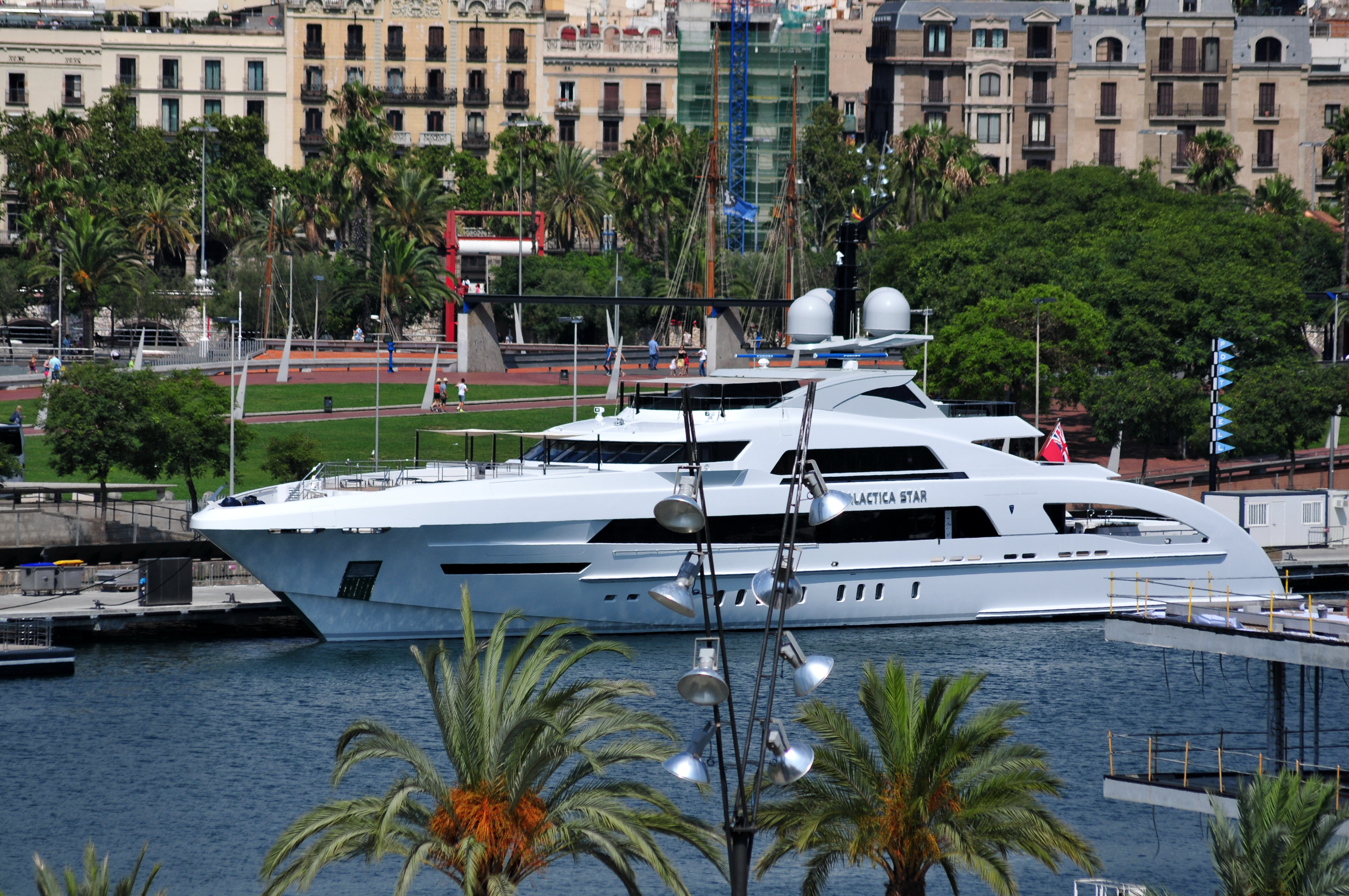
- Illusion in Barcelona.

History

Cayman Islands
- Name: Illusion
- Builder: Heesen Yachts
- Yard number: 16465
- Launched: 25 March 2013
- Identification: IMO number: 9679830; MMSI number: 319744000; Callsign: ZGCU2

General characteristics
- Class & type: Motor yacht
- Tonnage: 984 gross tons
- Length: 65 m (213 ft)
- Beam: 11.40 m (37.4 ft)
- Draught: 3.05 m (10.0 ft)
- Propulsion: 2 × MTU 20V 4000 M93L; 2 × 5,592 hp (4,170 kW)
- Speed: 27 knots (50 km/h) (maximum)
- Capacity: 12 passengers
- Crew: 13 crew members

Illusion is a superyacht built in 2013 at the Dutch Heesen Yachts shipyard. The interior design of Illusion was done by Bannenberg & Rowell Design, and the exterior work was done by Omega Architects. It was launched as the Galactica Star with an original sale price of €65 million.

The yacht was seized in 2017 as part of the US government Kleptocracy Asset Recovery Initiative from former Nigerian Minister of Petroleum Resources, Diezani Alison-Madueke. It was then sold at auction in 2019 to Burgess yachts representing an unknown buyer. It was then renamed the Illusion.

The yacht is owned by shell company Paxford Ltd., and is operated by Burgess yachts, a yacht service provider, where it is available for charter.

== Design ==
The length of the yacht is 65 m (213 ft) and the beam is 11.40 m (37.4 ft). The draught of Illusion is 3.05 m (10.0 ft). Both the materials of the hull and the superstructure are made out of aluminum with teak laid decks. The yacht is Lloyd's registered, issued by Cayman Islands. The 65m Heesen superyacht Illusion (Project Omnia YN 16465) is a Fast Displacement Hull Form (FDHF) superyacht concept vessel, with aluminum hull and superstructure designed by Van Oossanen and Heesen Yachts Naval Architects. Illusion's exterior is designed by Omega Architects.

=== Specifications ===
The vessel has six cabins to accommodate 12 passengers in six cabins.

The builder/designer is Heesen Yachts, Heesen, Omega, Omega Architects, Van Oossanen & Associates.

== Engines ==
The main engines are two MTU 20V 4000 M93L with a combined power of 11,184 hp (8,340 kW). The yacht Illusion can reach a maximum speed of 27 knots (50 km/h), with a cruising speed of 24 knots (44 km/h).

== See also ==
- Motor yacht
- List of motor yachts by length
- List of yachts built by Heesen
