= Urai, Perm Krai =

Urai Ураи
- Village
- Location within Perm Krai Location within Russia
- Coordinates: 57°30′N 57°39′E
- Country: Russia
- Region: Perm Krai
- District: Beryozovsky District
- Time zone: UTC+5:00

Urai (Russian: Ураи) is a rural locality (a village) in Asovskoye Rural Settlement, Beryozovsky District, Perm Krai, Russia. The population was 35 as of 2010. There is 1 street.

== Geography ==
Urai is located on the Asovka River, 28 km southeast of Beryozovka (the district's administrative centre) by road. Asovo is the nearest rural locality.
