= Towers School and Sixth Form Centre =

Location
- Faversham Road; Ashford, Kent, TN24 9AL; England
- Coordinates: 51°10′24″N 0°53′5″E

Information
- Type: Academy
- Motto: Excellence in everything
- Established: 1967
- Closed: 3:15pm for students unless a club is attended; usually finishing at 3:45-4:00pm
- Department for Education URN: 136583 Tables
- Ofsted: Reports
- Principal: Richard Billings
- Gender: Mixed
- Age: 11 to 19
- Enrolment: 1558 (2024)
- Website: Official website

Towers School and Sixth Form Centre is a secondary school (Academy) in Ashford, Kent. The school was first established in 1967 and was named after the nearby towers standing at the entrance to Eastwell Park.

== History ==
The school was formed in 1967 and officially opened by Lady Brabourne who accompanied the first head teacher, Geoffrey Foster, to the ceremony. The first year saw a total of 90 pupils attend the school. The school was named when one of the councillors on the board of governors looked out of the window and upon seeing the towers of Eastwell Park, suggested naming the school after them.

The school became an academy convertor in April 2011.
