= John Staluppi =

American businessman

- Born: January 10, 1947 (age 79); Brooklyn, New York, U.S.
- Citizenship: U.S.
- Occupations: Businessman, entrepreneur, philanthropist
- Known for: Automotive dealerships, luxury yachts
- Spouse: Jeanette Staluppi
- Website: staluppi.org

John Staluppi (born January 10, 1947) is an American businessman and entrepreneur, known as the founder of Atlantic Auto Group and Millennium Superyachts.

== Early life ==
Staluppi was born in Brooklyn, New York in 1947. His father was an electrician and his mother a homemaker. Staluppi developed interest in cars at very young age. After high school, he started working as a mechanic at the age of 16.

== Career ==
Staluppi started his career in the automotive industry by working with Honda dealerships in United States in the 1970s. With time, he invested in other brands like Hyundai. In 1980, he founded the Atlantic Auto Group which sold vehicles from various manufacturers. Later, they opened dealerships in Long Island, New York, and Nevada. At that time, the group sold vehicles of multiple brands including Honda, Audi, Nissan, Cadillac and Jeep.

In the 1990s, Staluppi developed an interest in luxury yachts. He commissioned and owned several yachts, many of which were named after James Bond films, including Octopussy, Goldfinger, Moonraker, Casino Royale, Skyfall, and Spectre. In 1998, he founded a yacht construction company based in Florida, named Millennium Superyachts.

Staluppi also owns a collection of classic American cars. In 2018, he auctioned a portion of his collection through Barrett-Jackson, attracting collectors and automotive enthusiasts.

Staluppi is involved in philanthropy, supporting charitable organizations such as the Make-A-Wish Foundation, American Heart Association, and National Kidney Registry. In 2019, he paid $2.1 million at a charity auction to acquire the first 2020 Toyota Supra to roll off the production line. The funds from this auction went to the American Heart Association and the Bob Woodruff Foundation.
