= Andrew Rogers (journalist) =

British journalist and author (born 1962)

- Born: Andrew Neil Rogers; 14 December 1962 (age 63); Ipswich, England
- Education: University of Leicester
- Occupations: Author and journalist

Andrew Neil Rogers (born 14 December 1962) is a British journalist, author, and editor of trade publications.

== Personal life ==
Andrew Neil Rogers was born in Ipswich in 1962. He studied history at the University of Leicester. He then taught history at The Towers School in Ashford, Kent from 1985 to 1990. He moved to Amsterdam in 1990 and founded Writewell Quality Text. Writewell Quality Text specializes in translations from Dutch to English and the copywriting and editing of English text for publication in trade magazines, books and marketing material.

Rogers is a supporter of Ipswich Town Football Club. He is also a member of Crossroads International Church in Amsterdam.

== Journalism and copywriting ==
Rogers primarily writes for publications related to the Dutch superyacht industry. He is a contributor to Boat International magazine and has also written for The Superyachts, The Refit Annual, and other yachting and maritime publications.

Since 1995, Rogers has been a copywriter for Feadship, producing various publications, including its bi-annual Pilot book. He is also the editor of Yacht Valley Magazine"Yacht Valley Magazine". Holland Yachting Group. Archived from the original on 14 December 2013. published by the Holland Yachting Group, and Yacht Magazine for the Dutch yacht brokerage De Valk.

Outside the yachting industry, Rogers works with major corporations in the Netherlands, providing English-language copy and translations. His clients have included KLM Royal Dutch Airlines (including iFly Magazine), Amsterdam RAI, and Wageningen University & Research . He also edits the English-language edition of Amsterdam Seaports magazine"Amsterdam Seaports Magazine". Amsterdam Seaports. Archived from the original on 22 May 2013. and the magazine for the Port of Amsterdam.

== Published works ==
Rogers has authored and edited several books related to the yachting industry. His first book, The Feadship Story (1999), chronicles the history of Feadship, a luxury motor yacht builder, and was developed in collaboration with representatives of the three founding families and other company contributors.[citation needed]

His second book, Queen of Diamonds: World Cruising, co-written with skipper Ian van der Watt, explores the global influence of Feadship yachts. In 2003, he released The Making of Patriot, detailing the construction of the motor yacht Patriot at Bloemsma van Breemen. Subsequent works include Iduna: The Restoration of a Classic Dutch Yacht (2004) and Lulworth: The Restoration of the Century (2006), both documenting restorations led by Dutch businessman Johan van den Bruele.

In 2011, Rogers co-authored Voyages of M/Y AlumerciA, covering the yacht's voyages from 2001 to 2010. He also edited Building Athos (2012), a book about the creation of the sailing yacht Athos.

== Bibliography ==
- The Feadship Story. Yacht Report Group. 1999. ISBN 1897878656.
- Queen of Diamonds: World Cruising. Feadship Club. 2001.
- The Making of Patriot. Writewell. 2003.
- Iduna: The Restoration of a Classic Dutch Yacht. Van Klaveren Maritime. 2004.
- Lulworth: The Restoration of the Century. Writewell. 2006. ISBN 9789090217826.
- Voyages of M/Y AlumerciA. Private publication. 2011.
- Building Athos. Adrenaline Communicatie. 2012.
