= Vladimir Potanin =

Russian businessman and politician (born 1961)

- Владимир Потанин
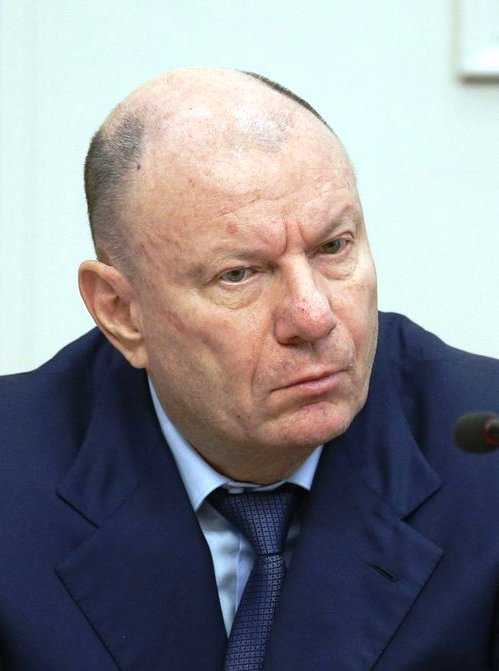
- Potanin in 2021

First Deputy Prime Minister of Russia
- In office 14 August 1996 – 17 March 1997; Served alongside Viktor Ilyushin and Alexey Bolshakov
- President: Boris Yeltsin
- Prime Minister: Viktor Chernomyrdin
- Preceded by: Oleg Lobov
- Succeeded by: Anatoly Chubais; Boris Nemtsov

Personal details
- Born: Vladimir Olegovich Potanin; 3 January 1961 (age 65) Moscow, Russian SFSR, Soviet Union
- Citizenship: Russian
- Spouses: Natalia Potanina (m. 1983; div. 2014) Yekaterina Potanina (m. 2014)
- Children: 5
- Education: Moscow State Institute of International Relations: Masters (M.Sc) in Finance (MGIMO) with the Ministry of Foreign Affairs
- Occupation: Founder and Chairman of Interros
- Awards: Order "For Merit to the Fatherland" (4th class); Order of Alexander Nevsky
- Website: Interros website

Vladimir Olegovich Potanin (Russian: Владимир Олегович Потанин; born 3 January 1961) is a Russian businessman, billionaire and statesman. He is the founder and president of Interros, which holds stakes in MMC Norilsk Nickel, Rosa Khutor, Rosbank, Yandex and TCS Group Holding. President of Norilsk Nickel, Chairman of the Board of Trustees of the State Hermitage Museum, founder of the Vladimir Potanin Charitable Foundation.

Forbes twice ranked him as the richest person in Russia — in 2015 and 2020. And across the 2021–2026 interval, Potanin consistently remained within the top five Russian billionaires.

In the 2026 Forbes ranking, Vladimir Potanin reasserted his position as the second-ranking Russian billionaire, a status he had not occupied since 2023. Globally, he was situated at rank 79. According to Bloomberg Billionaires Index—dated 24 August 2026—Potanin is positioned third among Russian billionaires and 113th globally, with a recalibrated net worth of US$23.0 billion. The index records a year-to-date contraction of US$3.41 billion.

Ukraine, the United Kingdom, the United States, Canada, Australia and New Zealand have imposed sanctions on Potanin.

== Early life and education ==
Potanin was born in Moscow, in the former USSR, into the family of a USSR trade representative in New Zealand.

He resided with his parents in Turkey for several years, receiving his primary education there. He continued his studies at Moscow School No. 58, graduating with a gold medal. In 1978, he attended the faculty of the International economic relations at Moscow State Institute of International Relations (MGIMO), which is run by the Ministry of Foreign Affairs. Upon graduating MGIMO in 1983, he followed in his father's footsteps and went to work for the all-union foreign trade organization (FTO) Soyuzpromexportfortvort, which was an arm of the Ministry of Foreign Trade. He served as senior engineer at the All-Union Foreign Economic Association (VFEA) "Soyuzpromexport".

== Career ==
=== Beginnings (1990–1998) ===
During perestroika, Potanin quit the State's structures of Foreign trade and in 1990 created the private association Interros, which was engaged in foreign economic consulting, using his knowledge gathered at Ministry of Foreign trade and his previous professional network.

From 1992 to 1993, Potanin served as vice president and subsequently president of the International Financial Company (MFK) bank, which he co-founded with Mikhail Prokhorov. In 1993, Potanin became president of the newly formed United Export Import Bank (ONEKSIMbank) (Russian: "ОНЭКСИМ-банк") (akas: Uneximbank; Onexim Bank; Oneksimbank).

In 1995, Potanin was instrumental in the creation of the "loans for shares" auctions that became a pillar of Russia's post-Soviet economic reform. The auctions allowed the selling-off of Russian firms' assets at below market prices and are regarded as the founding moment of Russia's oligarchy. According to the New York Times, the auctions plan was regarded in 1999 "almost universally as an act of colossal criminality."

At the same time, the work of Professor Daniel Treisman, published by the U.S. National Bureau of Economic Research (NBER), presents the following conclusion based on a retrospective analysis of Western publications and economic data: compared to state-owned companies sold to incumbent managers, the firms sold to oligarchs performed significantly better, contributing to Russia's rapid economic growth after 1999. Thus, the loans-for-shares program helped accelerate Russia's recovery.

From 14 August 1996 until 17 March 1997, he worked as First Deputy Prime Minister of the Russian Federation.

During his tenure in the Russian government, he chaired approximately 20 federal, governmental, and interagency commissions, including the Government Commission on Financial and Monetary Policy, the Operational Commission under the Government of the Russian Federation for Improving the Payment and Settlement System, and the Interagency Commission of the Russian Federation for Cooperation with International Financial and Economic Organizations and the "Group of Seven". He served as the Russian Federation's Governor at the International Bank for Reconstruction and Development and at the Multilateral Investment Guarantee Agency.

In autumn 1997, Potanin established the Prof-Media CJSC holding company to manage all media assets owned by ONEXIM Bank, including Izvestia, Komsomolskaya Pravda, Afisha, and Bolshoy Gorod.

In 1997, Boris Jordan introduced George Soros to Potanin which led to the Soros Group supported by Potanin, Anatoly Chubais, and Alfred Koch to have the controlling stake in the Russian communications monopoly over the Berezovsky-Gusinsky group. One year later Soros admitted that his large investment in Svyazinvest was a mistake.

Since August 1998, Potanin has held the positions of both president and chairman of the board of directors of the Interros Company.

On 25 November 1998, Potanin recommended Boris Jordan to be Chairman of Sidanko which Jordan held until February 1999 when he stepped down.

=== Interros ===
Interros is a Russian private investment company. Its projects span nearly all sectors of the Russian economy.

The key asset of Interros is Norilsk Nickel - the world's largest producer of palladium and high-grade nickel, and one of the major suppliers of platinum and copper.

Another significant Interros project is the Rosa Khutor mountain resort in Sochi, which served as one of the main venues for the 2014 Winter Olympics. Its establishment contributed to the development of Russia's tourism industry.

In 2022, Interros, at Vladimir Potanin's initiative, acquired a stake in Russian IT developer Reksoft. The company's clients include OK hypermarket chain, S7 Airlines, major airports, VTB and Otkritie banks, GLONASS, Gazprom Neft, and Russian Post.

In April 2025, venture fund Voskhod, with Interros as its anchor investor, invested 1 billion rubles in New Diamond Technology (NDT), a company developing diamond wafers for the electronics industry.

In May 2025, Catalytic People — a joint venture between Interros and T-Technology — acquired a 9.95% stake in PJSC Yandex.

=== Norilsk Nickel ===
Potanin and his long-term business partner Mikhail Prokhorov acquired Norilsk Nickel (or Nornickel) in the early 1990s under the "loans for shares" scheme, owning between them 54% of the firm. Potanin owned as of 2018 a 34% stake in the company. They streamlined operations and turned Norilsk Nickel into a modern corporation.

In 2017–2018, under Potanin's leadership as president of Norilsk Nickel, the company launched both the Bystrinsky GOK mining and processing plant and the Sulfur Project.

In 2022, Vladimir Potanin implemented several initiatives to enhance employee participation in the management and ownership structures of Norilsk Nickel and Rosbank.

In the spring of 2024, representatives of Norilsk Nickel, headed by Potanin, announced the upcoming transfer of copper production from Russia to China. This plan was motivated both by the need to circumvent Western sanctions when exporting copper to foreign markets, and by China's significantly less stringent environmental standards than those in Russia. According to Potanin's representatives, further modernization of the existing outdated production to comply with Russian environmental standards turned out to be completely unprofitable for Norilsk Nickel, and the company preferred to carry out new construction in a country with less expensive environmental requirements.

=== Other investments ===
Potanin also owned a stake in Petrovax Pharm, a pharmaceutical company during norties.

==== Rosa Khutor ski resort ====
In the early 2000s, Potanin became the first major Russian businessman to initiate the construction and development of ski slopes in the Krasnaya Polyana area.

Potanin was inspired to develop the Rosa Khutor ski resort in the Mzymta valley near Sochi after skiing with Putin in Austria in 2003. He invested more than $2 billion into the resort after Sochi was picked for the 2014 Olympic Winter Games in 2007.

He allegedly urged Putin to approve expansion in the area to create a "Russian Courchevel", despite oppositional pressure from environmental groups who claimed it would further damage the region.

Following Potanin's complaint about a cost overrun of at least $530 million during the construction of hotels and chalets in Sochi and the Rosa Khutor ski resort (as required by the International Olympic Committee), Potanin sought compensation from the Russian government for the extra costs incurred.

It was later shown that construction of the Rosa Khutor resort had resulted in a vast patch of forest being cut down, although Potanin had announced that construction would require "little excavation and zero logging". This was strongly criticized by environmental conservation groups, such as Environmental Watch on North Caucasus.

Between 2005 and 2010, Potanin invested $500,000 in starting a leopard breeding initiative in the Mzymta valley. In 2015, he asked president Putin to allow for permits to double the size of the ski resort, an expansion that will threaten the leopard program he contributed to.

==== Iran ====
In 2016, Winter Capital Partners, owned by Interros, acquired a stake in Swedish Pomegranate (firm), which held 9.6% of shares in Iranian company Sarava, which is a shareholder in a number of Iranian internet companies, such as Digikala, the country's largest online retailer. Some media subsequently reported that Potanin became the first investor to enter Iran after sanctions were lifted. In March 2022, Interros terminated its participation in the Swedish fund's operations.

==== Cryptocurrency ====
Potanin is a member of the Russian Union of Industrialists and Entrepreneurs (RSPP), a lobby group that sent Prime Minister Dmitry Medvedev a proposal for alternative cryptocurrency regulations in October 2018.

==== Vneshekonombank ====
In May 2015, Potanin was named a co-defendant in a case in which state-owned Vnesheconombank (VEB) was looking for damages for losses from the liquidation of Roskhlebprodukt, in which he indirectly owned a stake. In total, VEB sought $68 million in damages from Potanin and others.

==== Rosbank ====
In April 2022 owing to the International sanctions during the 2022 Russian invasion of Ukraine, French banker Societe Generale had stranded Rosbank assets and was seeking a quick exit from Russia. Interros bought the distressed assets. The French banker had paid an estimated $4.3 billion to Interros over the period between 2006 and 2014 to amass nearly all the shares in the Russian bank and its subsidiaries. As a result of this transaction the French banker wrote off its balance sheet $3.3 billion. Four months later Potanin announced his intention to transfer 50% of Rosbank's shares to his own charitable foundation. Another 7.5% of the shares were sold to a subsidiary of Rosbank – the investment company Rusfinance.

==== Tinkoff Bank ====
In April 2022 Oleg Tinkov sold his shares in TCS Group to Potanin-controlled Interros for $325 million. According to Tinkov, he was offered a price of about 3% of the real value of his shares, but was forced to accept the offer as officials of the Putin administration threatened to nationalize the bank after he publicly criticized the 2022 Russian invasion of Ukraine.

In August 2024, Interros increased its stake to 41.4%, becoming the largest non-controlling shareholder of the holding company.

== Forbes net worth and rankings ==
In the 2026 Forbes ranking, Vladimir Potanin reasserted his position as the second-ranking Russian billionaire, a status he had not occupied since 2023. Globally, he was situated at rank 79, with a pecuniary valuation orbiting US$29.7 billion, which constitutes a year-over-year augmentation of approximately US$5.5 billion. Forbes essentially attributes this capital consolidation to his sustained dependency on Norilsk Nickel, T-Bank, and Catalytic People, while simultaneously foregrounding, emphasizing, and reiterating the expansionary trajectory of Interros into fintech and high-tech domains since late 2021, particularly with the 2025 joint venture maneuver involving T-Technologies and the acquisition of stakes in Yandex and Selectel.

In the 2025 Forbes ranking, Potanin maintained the fifth place domestically and 81st globally, with a net worth of US$24.2 billion. This represents a marginal increment from the 2024 estimate of US$23.7 billion. Forbes connects this positioning to his enduring equity stake in Norilsk Nickel and, importantly, to the escalation of his ownership in T-Bank to 41.4%. This followed, and resulted from, the integration of Rosbank in September 2024 via additional share issuance. Additionally, Interros had earlier acquired Rosbank from Société Générale in 2022 and secured a 35.1% stake in the parent entity of Tinkoff Bank.

In 2024, Potanin had slipped to fifth place among Russian billionaires and ranked 85th globally, with a stable net worth of US$23.7 billion—unchanged, notably, from 2023. Forbes references his endorsement of the Rosbank–Tinkoff merger and highlights the ongoing legal contention with UC Rusal over Norilsk Nickel assets. It also reiterates—almost formulaically—that his primary wealth sources remain anchored in non-ferrous metals and finance.

In 2023, Potanin kept second place among Russian billionaires and ranked 62nd globally, with an estimated net worth of US$23.7 billion. That is an increase of about US$6.4 billion compared to 2022. Forbes attributes this to his ownership stakes: 37% in Norilsk Nickel, 45% in Rosbank, and 35% in TCS Group. It also references, quite explicitly, the acquisition of Rosbank and the purchase of Oleg Tinkov’s family stake in May 2022—strategic timing, decisive execution.

In 2022, Potanin retained second place domestically but dropped to 97th globally, with his net worth declining to US$17.3 billion. That is a decrease of US$9.7 billion from 2021. This contraction occurred amid sanctions and broader market downturns affecting Russian businessmen. His principal asset base remained approximately 36% ownership in Norilsk Nickel shares.

In 2021, Potanin held second place among Russian billionaires and ranked 55th globally, with a net worth of US$27 billion—an annual increase of US$7.3 billion. Forbes attributes this to his approximately 35% ownership of Norilsk Nickel, categorizing it under non-ferrous metals. The narrative also intersects with renewed disputes with Oleg Deripaska over corporate governance and dividend policies following an environmental incident.

Year	Net worth (US$ billion)	Global rank	Rank in Russia	Change (YoY)
2026	$29.7	79	2	+$5.5B
2025	$24.2	81	5	+$0.5B
2024	$23.7	85	5	±0
2023	$23.7	62	2	+$6.4B
2022	$17.3	97	2	−$9.7B
2021	$27.0	55	2	+$7.3B
2020	$19.7	41	1	+$1.6B

== Public involvement ==
In March 2003, he took charge of the National Council on Corporate Governance (NSKU), whose main goal is to improve the legislative regulations in Russia and to introduce professional and ethical standards of corporate governance in Russian companies. The goal is to boost the reputation and investment appeal of the Russian businesses.

=== Public Chamber of the Russian Federation ===
In 2006, Vladimir Potanin was elected to the inaugural composition of the Public Chamber of the Russian Federation, where he chaired the Commission for the Development of Philanthropy, Charity and Volunteerism.

From 2008 to 2010, he led efforts to improve legislation concerning non-commercial organizations (NCOs). The Commission significantly improved the legislative framework in this area. Notably, in collaboration with the Russian Ministry of Economic Development, it developed the federal law "On the Procedure for Forming and Using Endowment Capital of Non-Commercial Organizations," which has been in force since 2007. On the commission's initiative, amendments were introduced to the Tax Code of the Russian Federation concerning various aspects of nonprofit organizations' operations and charitable activities in general.

=== Support of public organizations ===
Potanin was a member of The Russian Government's Council on Competitiveness and Entrepreneurship

Member of the Board Bureau of the Russian Union of Industrialists and Entrepreneurs (RSPP)

Chairman of the National Council for Corporate Governance (NSCG)

Member of the Board of Trustees of the Russian Geographical Society

Member of the Board of Trustees of the National Charitable Foundation for Support of Russian Olympians

Chairman of the Supervisory Board and Vice-Chairman of the Board of Trustees of the Russian International Olympic University (RIOU)

He was previously a member of the Supervisory Board of the ANO "Sochi 2014 Organizing Committee" and served on the Presidium of the Presidential Council for the Development of Physical Culture and Sports, High Achievement Sports, and the Preparation and Hosting of the XXII Olympic Winter Games and XI Paralympic Winter Games of 2014, and the XXVII Summer Universiade of 2013 in Kazan.

In 2019, Potanin signed the "Business Ambition for 1.5°C" pledge, committing his company to work towards achieving the goals of the Paris Climate Agreement, which aims to limit global temperature increase to 1.5-2 °C above pre-industrial levels.

In 2024, the businessman became head of the Board of Trustees of Central University — Russia's first higher education institution based on the STEM model.

Vladimir Potanin was one of the initiators of the founding of the Kontinental Hockey League (KHL).

Potanin also serves as chairman of the board of trustees of the Amateur Hockey Development Foundation "Night Hockey League".

== Charity ==
Vladimir Potanin is engaged in philanthropy and public service. In 1999, Potanin established the non-profit charitable organization "The Potanin Foundation" to implement long-term projects in the fields of Russian education and culture.

From December 2001 to 2022, he served on the Board of Trustees of the Guggenheim Foundation (New York).

From June 2002 to 2008, he has been Chairman of the Board of Directors of the Hermitage-Guggenheim Charitable Foundation.

In 2002, Potanin purchased Kazimir Malevich’s Black Square for $1 million and donated the painting to the State Hermitage Museum’s collection.

Since April 2003, he has been Chairman of the Board of Trustees of the State Hermitage Museum.

With Potanin’s support, the following projects were realized: "Grand Hermitage", Restoration of the "Chariot of Glory" on the General Staff Building arch, "Hermitage in the Sky" project.

His donations to the Hermitage’s endowment fund totaled $5 million. These money was used to acquire Bill Viola’s video installation Ocean Without a Shore (2018, the museum’s first video artwork), Anselm Kiefer’s Aurora (2018), collection of Western European art (11th–17th centuries), comprising 50 pieces (2019).

From May 2006, he served as Deputy Chairman of the Board of Trustees of MGIMO (abolished in 2022). His donations to MGIMO’s endowment fund amounted to $6.5 million.

With the participation of Potanin, the Russian International Olympic University (RIOU) was founded in October 2009. Interros became a co-founder and the sole sponsor of RIOU.

In early 2010, Potanin stated in an interview with the Financial Times that he intended to allocate the majority of his capital to public benefit.

In June 2010, the philanthropic campaign "The Giving Pledge" was launched, which Potanin later joined, thereby agreeing to donate at least half of his capital to charity.

Vladimir Potanin is a member of the Board of Trustees of the Moscow Church Construction Support Fund. He financed the construction of the Church in honor of the Holy Blessed Prince Alexander Nevsky at MGIMO on Lobachevsky Street.

In 2014, Vladimir Potanin was awarded the title of "Patron of the Year".

In 2016, with Vladimir Potanin's assistance, more than 250 works by Soviet and Russian contemporary artists were donated to the National Museum of Modern Art in France.

In 2019, Vladimir Potanin presented to the public one of the largest private collections of Olympic awards, managed by RIOU. This collection, comprising over 450 artifacts (medals, diplomas, torches, etc.), spans the period from the first modern Olympic Games in 1896 to the present day and is one of the largest in the world.

In March 2020, Vladimir Potanin donated one billion rubles to support the nonprofit sector during the COVID-19 pandemic.

In 2021, Potanin was awarded the "Philanthropist of the Year" prize by Forbes. The award was given for his systematic development of Russian philanthropy, including the creation of endowment funds and transformation of the charitable sector.

=== Charitable foundation ===
In 1999, he established the non-profit organization "Vladimir Potanin Charitable Foundation" for the implementation of long-term projects in the field of domestic education and culture. It laid the foundation for systematic philanthropy in Russia.

In 2021, 2022, and 2023, the Potanin Charitable Foundation headed the ranking of charitable foundations, and Potanin himself personally headed the ranking of the most business philanthropists according to "Kommersant" three times (in 2020, 2021, and 2022).

Throughout its entire period of operation, the foundation established by Potanin has provided support to more than 40,000 individuals, amounting to over 12 billion rubles.

The Foundation implements a number of charitable programs: "Museum Without Borders", Effective Philanthropy", "Center for Philanthropy Development", "The Power of Sports", "Innovation and Development.

In 2000, the businessman launched one of the first scholarship programs implemented by Russian charitable organizations. The Potanin Foundation awards named scholarships, the amount of which as of 2025 is 25,000 rubles per month.

The organization also compiles its own ranking of universities, which represents an assessment of the participating higher education institutions in the foundation's scholarship program, taking into account the achievements of the grant recipients.

In 2016, Potanin's charitable organization, the Vladimir Potanin Foundation, donated works of art to be displayed at the Centre Pompidou's exhibition of Russian and Soviet art along with another 40 donors including Vladimir Semenikhin, the Tsukanov Family Foundation and others. For his efforts, Potanin was awarded the French Legion of Honour later that year.

In 2022, Potanin transferred part of his capital to the fund in the form of Rosbank shares and handed over management to the executive team.

=== Norilsk Nickel ===
In 2014, the program "World of New Opportunities" was launched to support and develop Norilsk, Taimyr, Monchegorsk, and the Pechengsky District of Murmansk Oblast.

From 2014 to 2024, within the framework of this program, support was provided to 967 socially significant projects, totaling 1.131 billion rubles.

In February 2024, Norilsk Nickel merged the "World of New Opportunities" program and the corporate volunteer program "Goodness Combine" into a single umbrella project "People of the Territory" to increase the efficiency of the company's social investments. For 2024, the budget of the social projects competition "World of New Opportunities" amounted to 155 million rubles, with 117 initiatives receiving funding.

«Norilsk Nickel and Vladimir Potanin are among the largest benefactors of the Russian Orthodox Church, providing support to churches, monasteries, and social and charitable projects of the dioceses and metropolises of the Russian Orthodox Church.

== Awards ==
- Full Cavalier of the Order "For Merit to the Fatherland"
- Order of Alexander Nevsky (24 March 2014)
- Medal "In Commemoration of the 850th Anniversary of Moscow"
- Medal "In Commemoration of the 300th Anniversary of Saint Petersburg"
- Letter of Honor from the President of the Russian Federation (22 April 2010)
- Letter of Appreciation from the President of the Russian Federation (25 July 1996)
- Cavalier of the Legion of Honour (France, 2017)
- Officer of the Order of Arts and Letters (France, January 2007)
- Badge of Honor "For Charity and Mercy" (Ministry of Education of the Russian Federation, September 2002)
- Order of Saint Equal-to-the-Apostles Grand Prince Vladimir, 3rd and 2nd degrees (Russian Orthodox Church)
- Order of Saint Sergius of Radonezh, 3rd and 2nd degrees (Russian Orthodox Church)
- Order of Saint Daniel of Moscow, 1st (2012) and 2nd degrees (Russian Orthodox Church)
- Order of Saint Seraphim of Sarov, 1st degree
- Patriarchal Badge of Saint Great Martyr Barbara, 1st degree
- Laureate of the International Foundation for the Unity of Orthodox Peoples Award for 2003
- Order of Saint Anna, 2nd degree (Russian Imperial House, December 2009) — in recognition of merits before the Fatherland and the Russian Orthodox Church
- Golden Order of the Apostle Paul (Cyprus)

== Sanctions ==
In January 2018, Potanin appeared on the US Treasury's "Putin list" of 210 individuals closely associated with Russian president Vladimir Putin.

He was sanctioned by the UK government in 2022 in relation to the Russo-Ukrainian War.

On 6 April 2022, the Trudeau government added Potanin to its sanctions list over the Russian invasion of Ukraine.

On 15 December 2022, the US Treasury joined others by adding Potanin to its sanction list.

== Criticism ==
=== Dispute with Mikhail Prokhorov ===
In 2007, Potanin split with Prokhorov, citing Prokhorov's brief detention by French police over soliciting prostitution as the reason and announced the intent to acquire Prokhorov's Norilsk Nickel assets for a reported $1 billion. Prokhorov offered to sell his 25% stake for $15 billion. However, Potanin refused the deal and it never came to pass.

According to a report published by investigative platform Meduza in 2016, Prokhorov turned to Valentin Yumashev, former Russian president Boris Yeltsin's chief of staff, to appeal to president Vladimir Putin. Reportedly, Putin "phoned Potanin in Prokhorov's presence and chewed him out, saying, 'It's dishonest to cheat on partners.'" Prokhorov ultimately decided to sell his 25% Norilsk stake to RUSAL's Oleg Deripaska instead.

In March 2009, he sued Prokhorov for $29 million over a property disagreement in Moscow.

=== Ownership dispute with Oleg Deripaska ===
In 2008, Deripaska reached an agreement with Prokhorov for the acquisition of his Norilsk Nickel stake, against Potanin's wishes. In return, Prokhorov acquired 14% of RUSAL.

This sparked an ownership conflict between Deripaska and Potanin that was halted in 2012, when Roman Abramovich stepped in as a peacemaker by acquiring 6.5% of Norilsk and thereby maintaining the balance of power between Deripaska and Potanin. The truce also barred the parties to sell or acquire new stakes. The deal made Potanin CEO of the company, as he owned roughly 30% of Norilsk, about 2% more than Deripaska.

In February 2018, Potanin offered to buy 4% of Abramovich's stake. A provisional acquisition agreement was reached in March for Potanin to buy a 2% stake in Norilsk from Abramovich. The purchase was not yet officially approved as of March 2018, pending a court ruling in May that will decide whether the acquisition would breach the 2012 stakeholder agreement. If the purchase is approved, Potanin would own 32.9% of Norilsk against Deripaska's 27.8%. In April, Deripaska called off the deal citing sanctions as the reason.

On 28 June 2018 the court ruled against the sale of Abramovich assets to Potanin. It was unknown at the time whether Deripaska would exercise a contingent right to purchase shares.

In August 2023, former FBI special agent Charles McGonigal pleaded guilty in connection to a scheme to place Potanin on a U.S. sanctions list on behalf of sanctioned Russian oligarch, Oleg Deripaska.

=== Environmental pollution ===
Throughout Potanin's tenure as CEO, Norilsk Nickel has been consistently criticized for its environmental record. The company was named as one of the biggest polluters in the Russian Arctic, and the city of Norilsk was named among the most polluted places on Earth. According to a 2013 report, Norilsk Nickel's operations "discharge some 500 tons of copper and nickel oxides per year and release another 2 million tons of sulfur dioxide into the atmosphere annually", accounting for a life expectancy of local residents 10 years below the Russian national average. According to reports from journalists who visited the city, Norilsk is surrounded by "1.2 million acres of dead forest", or that "nature in a radius almost the size of Germany is dead from severe air pollution", depending on the source.

As a result, pressure has been mounting on Potanin from Putin to clean up Norilsk Nickel's operations. In 2010, Putin stated that solving ecological problems in the Norilsk area must be one of the company's leadership's main tasks.

In September 2016, the local Daldykan river ran red after a suspected break of a Norilsk Nickel slurry pipe released industrial waste into the water. Norilsk Nickel was subsequently fined an undisclosed amount by the Russian Federal Service for Supervision of Natural Resources (Rosprirodnadzor).

During a meeting with Putin in January 2017, Potanin promised to solve environmental problems by 2023 through the modernization of capacities. Briefing Putin on Norilsk Nickel's development and performance, Potanin promised to invest $17 billion over a seven-year period on measures to modernize the company's facilities and reduce pollution from its operations. Potanin said that the company planned to reduce its emissions by 75% as part of its long-term development programme through 2023. In the Norilsk area, emissions were reduced by 30–35% in 2017 alone, according to company data.

In May 2020, a major oil spill occurred at a power plant owned by Norilsk Nickel, flooding rivers with up to 21,000 cubic metres of diesel oil, in what has been described as the second-largest oil spill in modern Russian history.

In March 2021, Norilsk Nickel paid a fine of 145.5 billion rubles for the diesel fuel spill in Norilsk. Ministry of Natural Resources and Environment of the Russian Federation allocated only 22.5 billion rubles of these funds to Norilsk.

In October 2022, the restoration of fertile soil layer in the Ambarnaya River area was completed.

The company became the first in Russia to implement a permafrost monitoring system in its area of responsibility. For Norilsk's cleanup, the "Clean Norilsk" program was launched with a budget of 40 billion rubles.

At the end of 2023, as part of the "Sulfur Project," Norilsk Nickel launched the first technological line of the sulfur dioxide disposal complex. According to Federal Service for Supervision of Natural Resources data for 2024, 389 thousand tons of gases were captured and processed.

=== Byte Grid ===
The FBI announced in July 2018 that ByteGrid, a data solutions provider contracted to store Maryland State Board of Elections data, was owned by a private equity firm in which Potanin is an investor. A retroactive investigative report issued by the US Department of Homeland Security's National Cybersecurity and Communications Integration Center found no indication that the MDSBE corporate network had been compromised. The contract has since been transferred to Intelishift as a precaution.

== Personal life ==
Potanin's first marriage was to Natalia Potanina, with whom he has three children. They married in 1983 and divorced after 31 years of marriage. In 2014, Potanin married for a second time, to Ekaterina, with whom he has two children.

These three luxury motor yachts built by Oceanco were built for him:

- The 89 m (292 ft) Barbara, built in 2016.
- The 88.5 m (290 ft) Nirvana, built in 2012.
- The 76 m (249 ft) Anastasia, built in 2008.

Potanin is the only Russian to have signed The Giving Pledge, with a promise to donate at least half of his wealth to charity.

On 24 December 2021 he played a friendly chess match with grandmaster Ian Nepomniachtchi. The game ended with victory for the professional in the 38th move, though not with checkmate – Potanin conceded as a result of Nepomniachtchi's superior position. Chess experts rate Potanin's ability highly.

=== Divorce proceedings with Natalia Potanina ===
In 2016, Natalia Potanina filed a $15 billion lawsuit claiming profits of Norilsk Nickel as well as Interros International, in what would have been the world's largest divorce settlement. A Moscow district court rejected her claim in July 2017, arguing that the lawsuit's limitation period had expired.

The claim was preceded by a smaller claim of $7 billion in 2015, after Potanin had offered a divorce settlement including a monthly allowance of $250,000 as well as real estate in Moscow, London and New York. The claim was struck down in 2016. Natalia argued that Russian law demands that wealth accumulated during a marriage is split evenly between the divorcees.

== See also ==
- Semibankirschina
- List of Russian billionaires
