= List of mines in Botswana =

This list of mines in Botswana is subsidiary to the list of mines article and lists working, defunct and future mines in the country and is organised by the primary mineral output. For practical purposes stone, marble and other quarries may be included in this list.

== Diamond ==
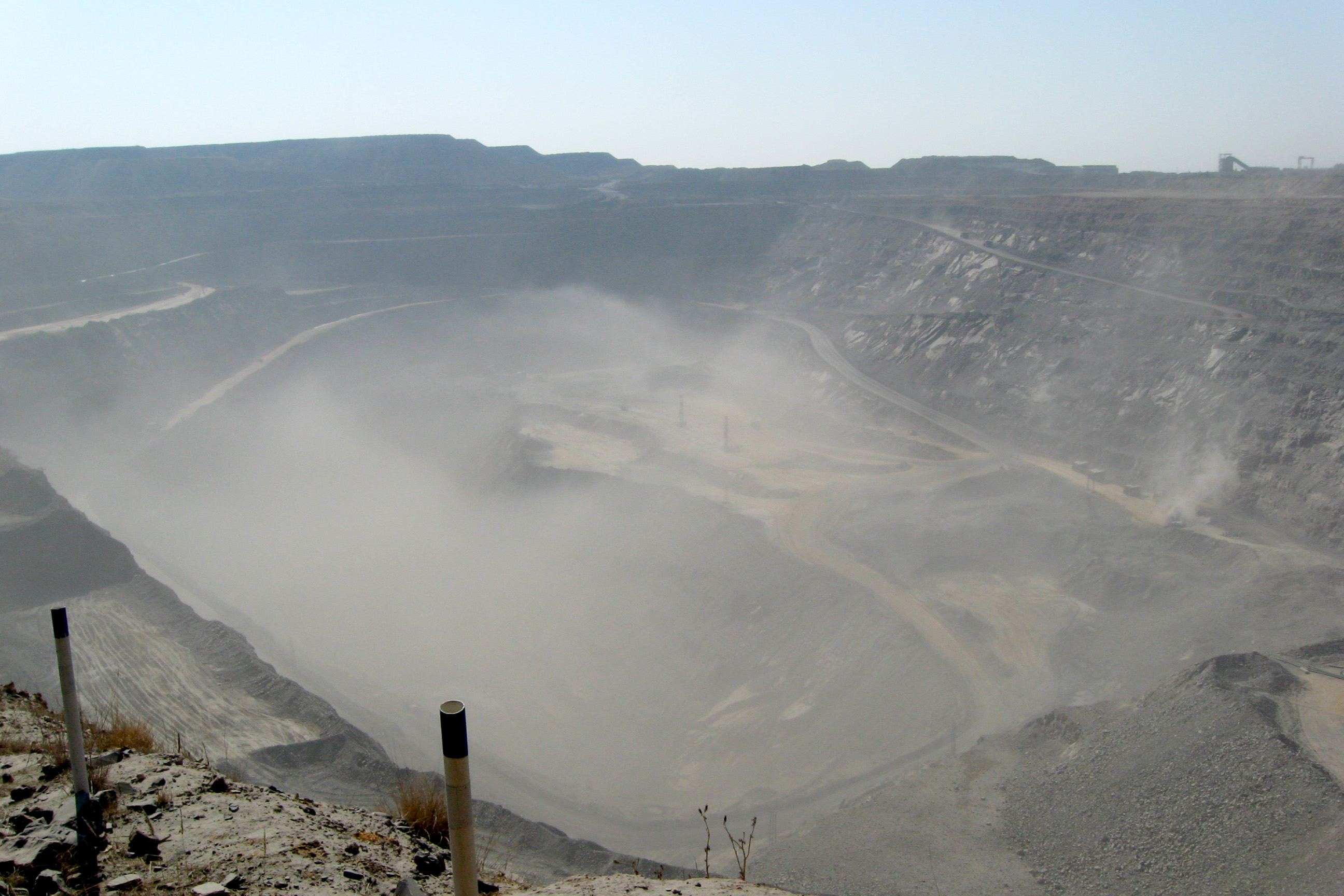
The Jwaneng Mine on a dusty day in 2007.

- Damtshaa diamond mine
- Jwaneng diamond mine
- Letlhakane diamond mine
- Lerala diamond mine
- Karowe diamond mine
- Orapa diamond mine

== Copper-nickel ==
BCl copper-nickel mine, Selibe Phikwe

This mine is now closed

== Gold ==
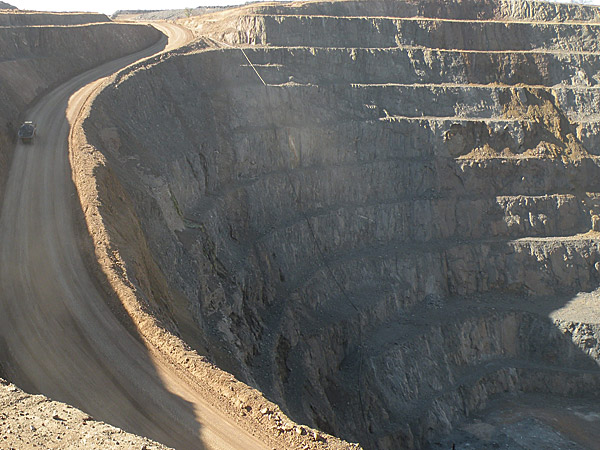
The edge of the Mupane gold mine

- Francistown
- Golden Eagle Mine
- Mupane Mine

== Nickel ==
- Phoenix nickel mine (also known as the Tati nickel mine)
- Selkirk mine

== Coal ==
- Letlhakane coal mine
- Masama coal mine
- Mea coal mine
- Mmamabula
- Morupule Colliery
- Sese coal mine

== Uranium ==
- Letlhakane mine (planned, as of 2024)

== Iron ore ==
- Ikongwe Iron ore mine
