= Sese =

Sese or SESE may refer to:

- Sese, Botswana, a village in Ngwaketse sub-district, Southern District (Botswana)
- Sese coal mine, in Central District, Botswana
- Sese Islands, an archipelago in Lake Victoria, Uganda
- Sese language, a Niger-Congo language of the Central African Republic and the Democratic Republic of the Congo
- Single-entry single-exit, in graph theory
- Social, Environmental and Scientific Education, a curriculum for primary school in English-speaking countries; see Greenwave
- Southern Exposure Seed Exchange, a seed company in Virginia, United States
- Swiss Transportation Safety Investigation Board (French: Service suisse d'enquête de Securité)

== People ==
- Sese, a Filipino surname derived from the Chinese surname Xie
- Juan Sesé y Balaguer (1736–1801), Aragonese composer
- María Teresa Sesé (1917–2019), Spanish writer
- Mobutu Sese Seko (1930–1997), president of the Democratic Republic of the Congo from 1965 to 1997
- Neil Ryan Sese (born 1979), Filipino actor
- Sese Bau (born 1992), Papua New Guinean cricketer

== See also ==
- Se (disambiguation)
