= Norilsk Nickel =

Russian mining company

OJSC MMC Norilsk Nickel

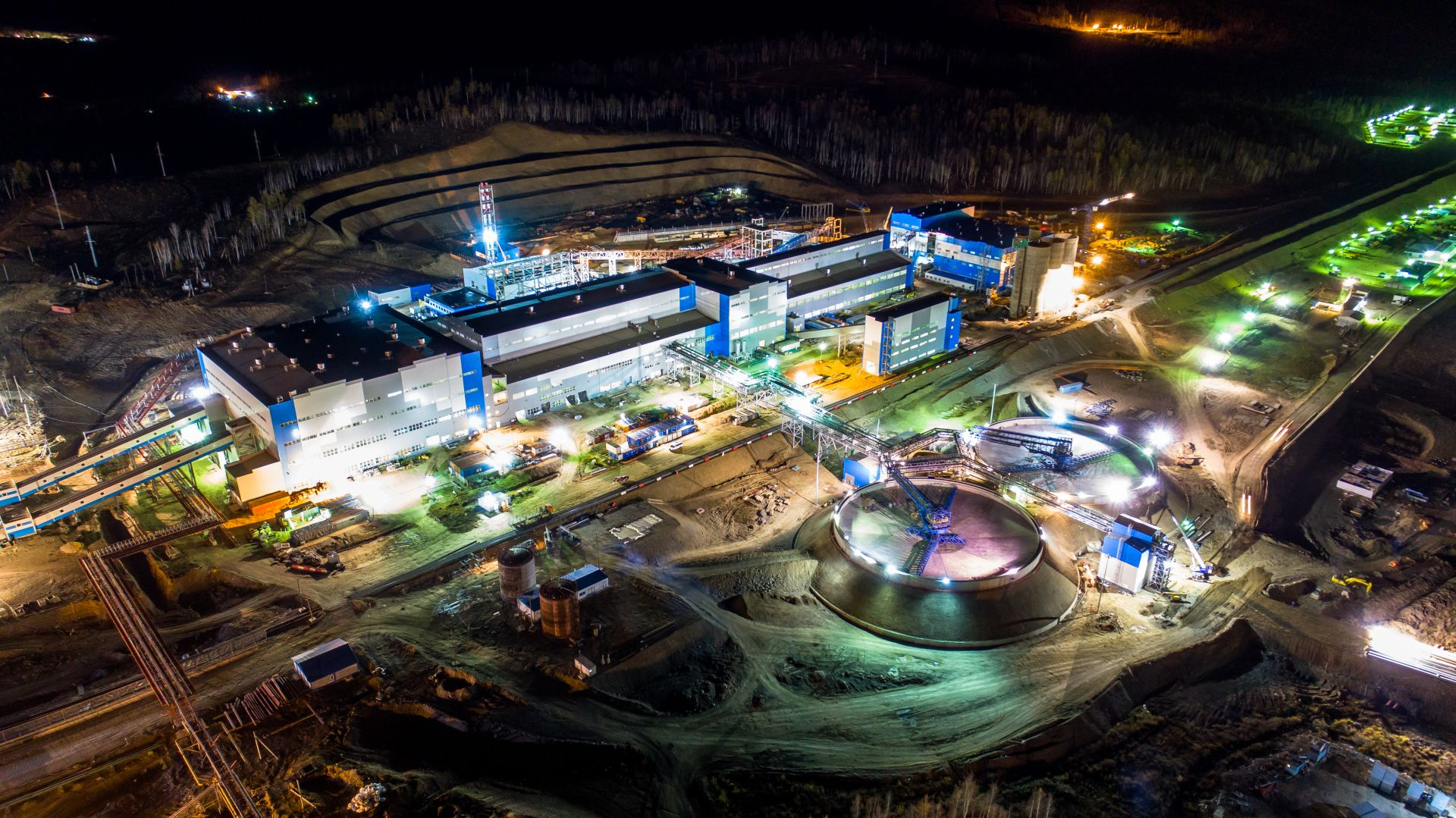
- Nornickel's Bystrinsky Mine and concentrator in October 2017
- Type: Public
- Traded as: MCX: GMKN; LSE: MNOD
- Industry: Mining, Metals
- Founded: 1993; 33 years ago
- Headquarters: Moscow, Russia
- Key people: Vladimir Potanin (President - Chairman of the Management Board)
- Products: Nickel; Palladium; Copper; Platinum; Gold; Cobalt; Selenium; Tellurium; Rhodium; Silver; Iridium; Ruthenium; Coal
- Revenue: $13.8 billion (2025)
- Operating income: $3.94 billion (2025)
- Net income: $2.47 billion (2025)
- Total assets: $31.3 billion (2025)
- Total equity: $13.4 billion (2025)
- Owner: Vladimir Potanin (34.59%); Rusal (27.82%)
- Number of employees: 73,700 (2019)
- Website: nornickel.com

Norilsk Nickel (Russian: ГМК «Норильский никель»), or Nornickel, is a Russian nickel and palladium mining and smelting company. Its largest operations are located in the Norilsk–Talnakh area near the Yenisei River in the north of Siberia. It also has holdings in Nikel, Zapolyarny, and Monchegorsk on the Kola Peninsula, in Harjavalta in western Finland, and in South Africa.

Headquartered in Moscow, Norilsk Nickel is the world's largest producer of refined nickel and the 11th largest copper producer.

The company is listed on MICEX-RTS. As of March 2021, its key shareholders were Vladimir Potanin's Olderfrey Holdings Ltd (34.59%) and Oleg Deripaska's Rusal (27.82%).

In December 2010, Norilsk Nickel made a share buyback offer for Rusal's 25% share in the company for $12 billion, but the offer was declined. In 2012, Potanin's Interros holding, Rusal, and Roman Abramovich signed a shareholder agreement on the size of dividend payouts to end a conflict over the matter, as well as issues around the company's broader strategy and management. The agreement expired on 1 June 2023, and the prospects of its extension or suspension were unclear. In March 2019, Abramovich sold a 1.7% stake in the company for $551 million, predominantly to British-based and Russian investors. Potanin and Deripaska's Rusal were blocked from purchasing any shares. In 2021, the company's revenue amounted to 856 billion rubles.

== History ==
Mining began in the Norilsk area in the 1920s. The Soviet government established the Norilsk Combine in 1935 and passed control to the NKVD. In 1943, Norilsk produced 4,000 tonnes of refined nickel, and by 1945, it had reached the target figure of 10,000 tonnes. The mining and metal production originally used forced labour from the Gulag system.

In 1993, after the fall of the Soviet Union, a joint-stock company called RAO Norilsk Nickel was created. Two years later, control over the deeply indebted company, which was bleeding cash at a rate of about $2 million a day against the background of falling nickel prices, was sold to a private company, Interros. By the end of privatization in 1997, the company had turned a profit, and workers were being paid. The current average pay exceeds $1,000 per month with an annual paid leave of two to three months. Nevertheless, the working and living conditions in Norilsk remain harsh, although they are improving as the company shuts down old factories that are the source of excessive pollution.

In July 2000, Norilsk Nickel joined forces with the St. Petersburg Research Institute of the Arctic and Antarctic (Russian: Арктический и антарктический научно-исследовательский институт), to investigate the potential use of decommissioned nuclear powered submarines, both from the United States and Russia, to transport materials along the Northern Sea Route (Russian: Северный морской путь (Севморпуть)). Overhaul and refit costs came to $72–80 million per submarine, which included modifying its ice-breaking bow to cut through ice up to 215 cm (85 in) thick in seawater and up to 150 cm (59 in) in the freshwater mouth of the Yenisei. Decommissioned Typhoon submarines were expected to transport up to 12,000 tonnes of supplies and nickel between Dudinka and either Murmansk or Arkhangelsk. In 2000, the Murmansk Shipping Company (MMP or MSCO) (Russian: Мурманское морское пароходство) provided icebreaker services at a charge of $11.35 per tonne of cargo. Three submarines - the project feasibility threshold - were scheduled for refit and overhaul between 2000 and 2003.

However, the stakeholders failed to reach an agreement as to who would conduct and cover the refit and overhaul of the submarines. Furthermore, money was not the only issue. Under existing international agreements, decommissioned nuclear-powered submarines from the navies of the two countries had to be dismantled. Should this obstacle be addressed, subsequent ownership of the refitted submarines also remained unclear: whether they would remain the assets of the Ministry of Defense or would be transferred to another governmental agency. One of the options suggested by Nornickel was to establish a joint transportation company that would lease the vessels.

In 2002, Nornickel accounted for most of MMP's shipping along the Northern Sea Route. In 2008, Aker Yards signed a contract with Norilsk Nickel for the delivery of four container/cargo ships for Arctic operations, with an option for a fifth.

In 2002, MMC Norilsk Nickel began purchasing gold mining assets, which were spun off in 2005 as Polyus Gold.

In 2003, the company took control of Stillwater Mining Company, the only palladium producer in the U.S. Stillwater operates a platinum group metals (PGM) facility in Stillwater, Montana. In November 2010, Norilsk Nickel announced the sale of Stillwater.

Throughout 2007, Norilsk acquired a host of mining and metallurgical assets abroad, transforming into a multinational company with operations in Australia, Botswana, Finland, Russia, South Africa, and the United States. Norilsk Nickel signed its key deal on 28 June 2007, acquiring approximately 90 percent of Canada's LionOre Mining International Ltd., the world's tenth-largest nickel producer at the time. This takeover, valued at $6.4 billion, was the biggest foreign acquisition by a Russian company at the time, making Norilsk Nickel the world's largest nickel producer.

On February 27, 2008, Norilsk Nickel diversified into the coal mining industry through North Star LLC by obtaining mining rights to the amount of 33.6 million rubles for the estimated 5.7 billion tonnes of coal at the Syradasai Field near the port of Dikson (Russian: Диксон) in the Taymyrsky Dolgano-Nenetsky District (Russian: Таймыр). In the coal mining industry, it competed with Rio Tinto and BHP Billiton. By the estimates of North Star LLC (Russian: ООО «Северная звезда»), a firm affiliated with Nornickel, developing the field would require an investment of $1.5 billion, which including the necessary expansion of the port of Dikson, another Nornickel asset. The only competitor for the rights to the Syradasai Field was Golevskaya Mining Company LLC (Russian: ООО «Голевская горнорудная компания»). The Syradasai Field is 105 to 120 km southeast of Dikson in the Taimyr-Turukhansk support zone (Russian: Таймыро-Туруханской опорной зоны). A 120-kilometer road and railway was expected to connect the deep-sea port on Cape Chaika to the massive coal deposit by 2019. CC VostokUgol (Russian: УК «ВостокУголь») or Vostok Coal planned to export up to 10 million tonnes of coal annually from the open-pit mine to Western Europe and the Asia-Pacific regions.

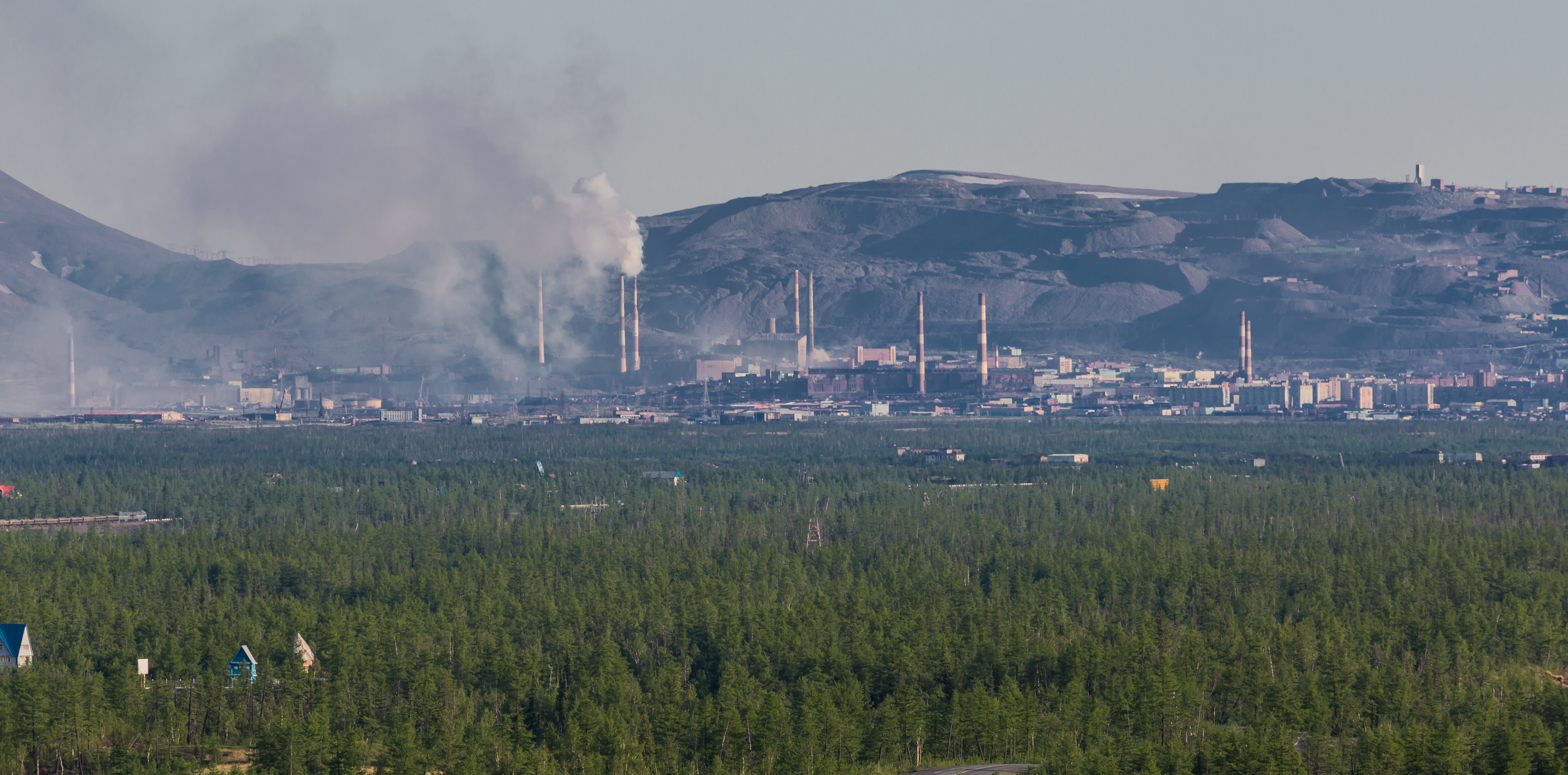
The Norilsk Nickel plant in 2016

In 2016, Nornickel ranked below 65 other oil, gas, and mining companies in a list of 92 involved in onshore resource extraction above the Arctic Circle, in terms of handling indigenous rights.

In 2018, North Star LLC was acquired by businessman Roman Trotsenko's AEON Group, changing its ownership. Neither Nornickel nor AEON disclosed the terms of the ownership transfer.

In the Arctic Environmental Responsibility Index (AERI), Norilsk Nickel is ranked No. 38 out of 120 oil, gas, and mining companies involved in resource extraction north of the Arctic Circle.

In April 2024, the United States and the United Kingdom announced a ban on imports of Russian aluminum, copper, and nickel. Due to sanctions, Norilsk Nickel planned to move some of its copper smelting to China and establish a joint venture with a Chinese company. Finished copper products would be sold as Chinese products to avoid Western sanctions. China is Norilsk Nickel's largest export market since 2023. Nickel is a critical metal in electric vehicle batteries, and palladium is critical element in catalytic converters, a component in natural gas vehicles. This plan was motivated not only by circumventing Western sanctions, but also China's significantly less stringent environmental standards than those in Russia.

== Operations ==
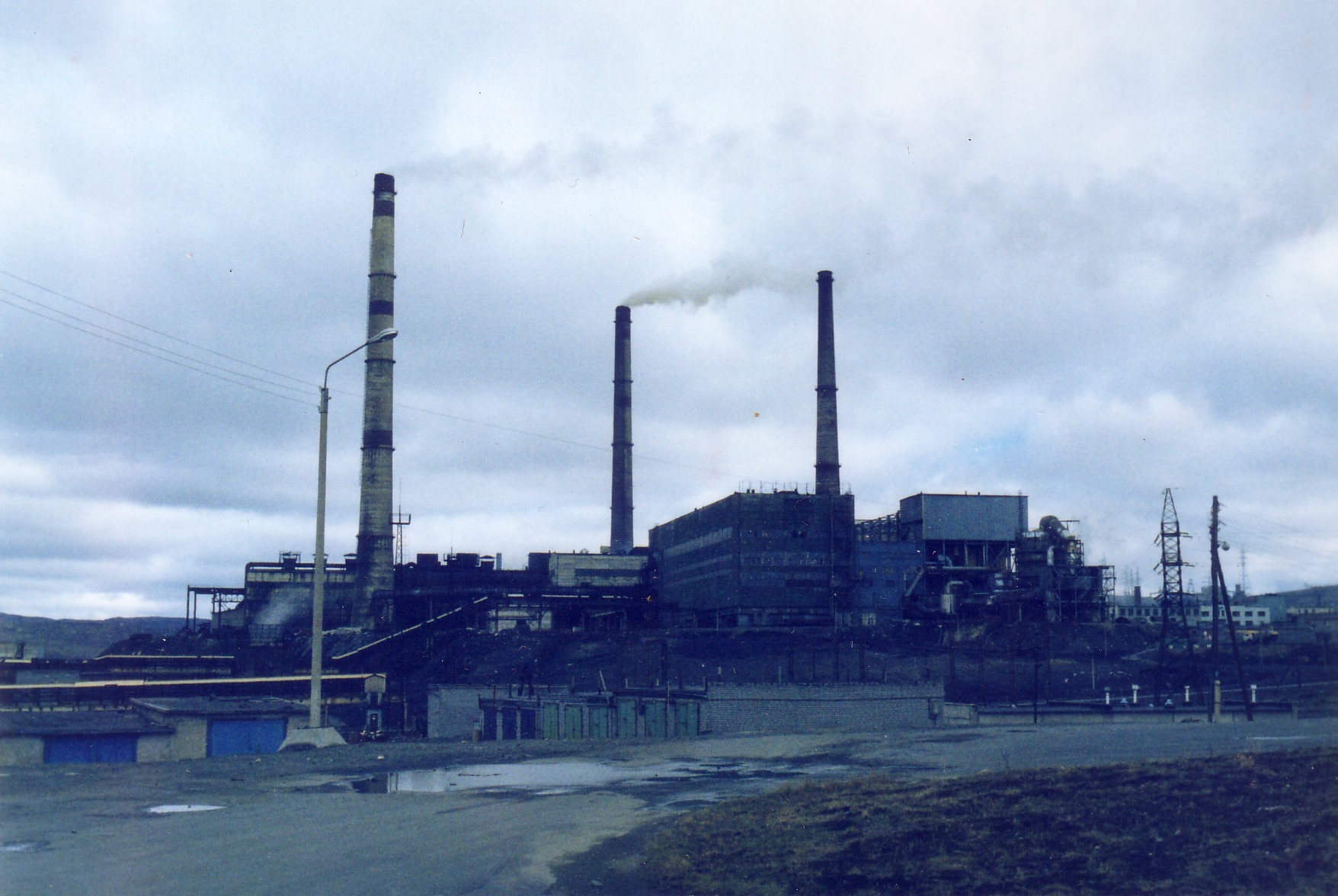
The Norilsk Nickel plant in Nikel (May 1991)

Nornickel is Russia's largest non-ferrous metallurgy company and one of the 10 largest private enterprises in the country.

In 2019, the company produced 229,000 tonnes of nickel, 499,000 tonnes of copper, 2.9 million ounces of palladium, and 0.7 million ounces of platinum.

Globally, Nornickel ranks:

- First in nickel production (accounting for 14% of global and 96% of Russian production). Bloomberg hails Nornickel as the world's most efficient nickel producer
- First in palladium production with a share of 41%
- Third in platinum production with a share of 10%

Nornickel also produces rhodium, cobalt, copper, silver, gold, iridium, ruthenium, selenium, tellurium, and sulfur.

Proven and possible reserves:

- 6.5 million tonnes of nickel
- 11.6 million tonnes of copper
- 118 million troy ounces of platinum-group metals

The company's revenue in 2020 reached $15.5 billion, with net profits of $3.6 billion.

Formed 250 million years ago during the eruption of the Siberian Traps igneous province (STIP), the Norilsk-Talnakh nickel deposits are the largest nickel-copper-palladium deposits in the world. The STIP disgorged over 1 million cubic kilometers of lava, a large portion of it through a series of flat-lying lava conduits below Norilsk and the Talnakh Mountains. The Siberian Traps are considered to be responsible for the late-Permian mass extinction event.

The district's first mineral resources were discovered in the 1840s when Alexander von Middendorff's expedition found the local coal deposits. In the 1860s, Friedrich Schmidt described the coal and surface copper ore found in the field that would later be called Norilsk 1. In the early days of the Soviet Union, Nikolay Urvantsev's expeditions revealed several industrially significant deposits. The 1930s saw the construction of the Norilsk Mining and Metallurgy Combine, which remains the pillar of local industry to date. The fields are located along the deep Norilsk-Khatanga Fault, and most mining operations employ underground methods. The area is believed to hold around 35% of the world's known nickel reserves, as well as 10% of its copper, 15% of its cobalt, and 40% of its platinum-group metals. The district's fields are divided into two clusters: the Norilsk Cluster in the southwest and the Talnakh Cluster in the northeast.

In 2022, Norilsk Nickel reiterated its output guidance for the year and said that operations remain uninterrupted. In the first update since the invasion of Ukraine, the miner reported that first-quarter nickel production increased 10% year-over-year to 52,000 tons. Palladium output declined 8% to 706,000 ounces and platinum fell by 12% to 163,000 ounces, but only from a higher-than-normal level a year ago.

=== Norilsk Ore Cluster ===
The cluster is located below Norilsk's city center and to the south of it, in the north-eastern part of the Norilsk Geological Basin. In 2021, Norilsk Nickel estimated the mineral reserves of the cluster at 156.6 million tonnes of ore, 400,000 tonnes of nickel, 600,000 tonnes of copper, and 25.6 million troy ounces of platinum-group metals. The rights to some of the cluster's deposits belong to Russian Platinum. Still, the corporation is unable to start mining because Nornickel, which controls the remote area's infrastructure, is blocking access. The two conflicting parties have a protracted history of negotiating a joint mining enterprise.

==== Norilsk 1 Field ====
The district's first actively developed field is located in the south of Norilsk's city center and to the south of the city. It is 30 to 350 meters thick. The northern part of the deposit consists of two branches: the "Coal Stream" and the "Bear Stream". Extraction has been ongoing since the 1940s at the Zapolyarny Mine, utilizing both underground and open-pit mining methods for the Coal Stream and Bear Stream quarries. The reserves of its northern section have mostly been depleted, and mining in the Coal Stream quarry has ceased.

Russian Platinum obtained the mining rights to the southern section in 2012 but has not yet utilized them due to its conflict with Nornickel.

==== Norilsk 2 Field ====
The field is located near Mount Gudchikha, to the east of Norilsk 1. In 1926, Nikolay Urvantsev discovered copper-nickel ore in the area, and mining began in the 1930s. However, the deposit turned out to be minor, and the decision was made to focus on Norilsk 1. Prospecting continued throughout the 1950s, but after the Talnakh Cluster was discovered, Norilsk 2 was abandoned.

==== Maslov Field ====
Located to the south of Norilsk 1, this field is believed to be an offshoot of the latter. Prospecting began here in the 1970s. The field spans over six kilometers from north to south, encompassing both the northern and southern sections. Two by four kilometers in size, the northern section is up to 300 meters thick, while the southern estate, which is up to 400 meters thick, has an area of three by 1.5 kilometers[8]. The mining rights to the deposit belong to Nornickel, which in 2019 announced plans to launch an underground mining operation by 2029.

==== Chernogorskoye Field ====
The field is located to the east of the Maslov Field near Mount Chernaya. An intrusion with a mineral composition similar to that of Norilsk 1 is up to 200 meters thick. In 2021, Russian Platinum signed a memorandum with VEB.RF and VTB to develop the field. The plans include open-pit mining in the eastern field section with an option for the subsequent underground development of its western part.

=== Talnakh Ore Cluster ===
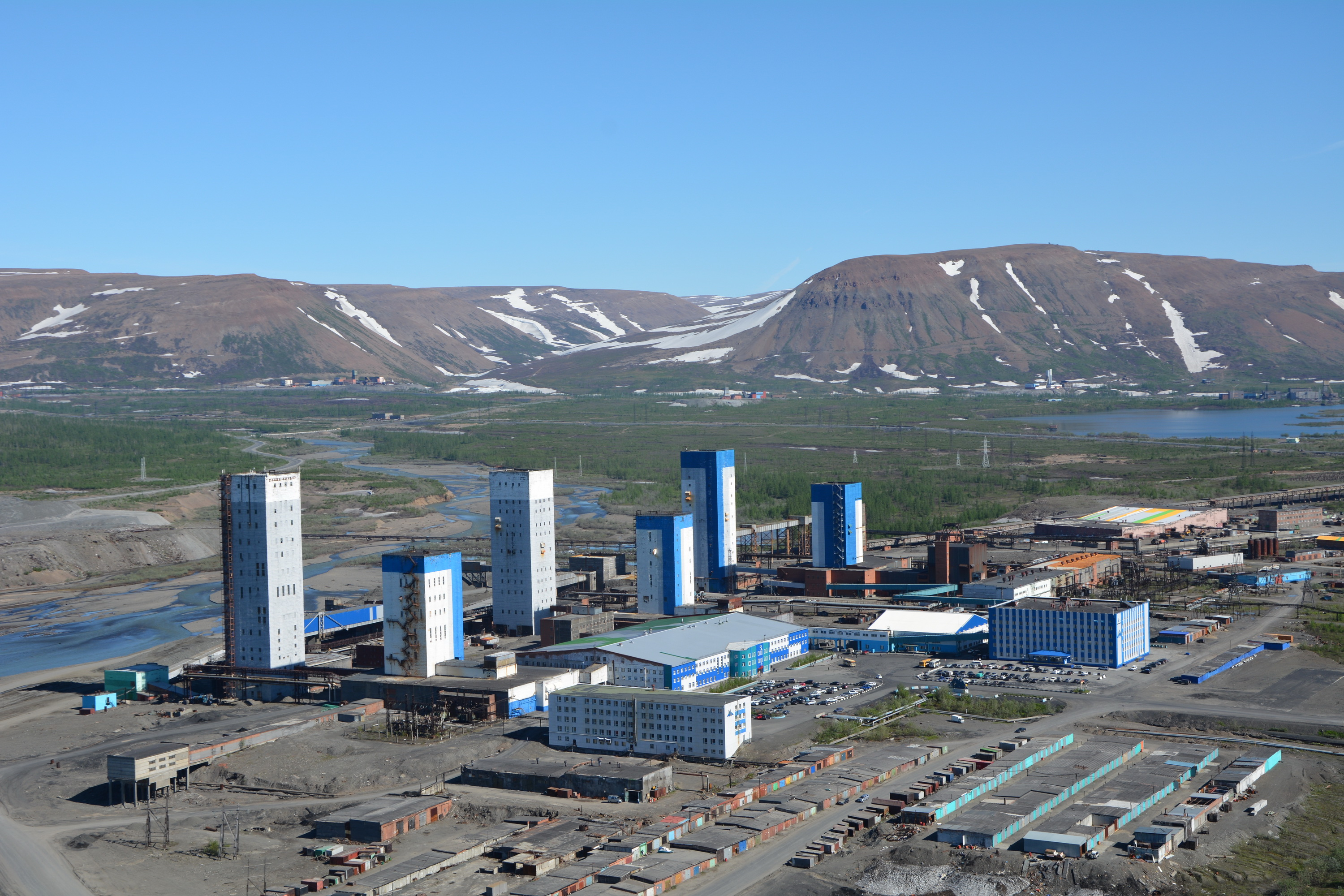
Nornickel's plant in Talnakh

The cluster is situated below the Talnakh District and to its northeast, in the southwestern part of the Kharayelakh Geological Basin. Following the discovery of its rich reserves of copper and nickel ore, the cluster became Norilsk's primary source of mineral resources. Its proven resources include over 100 kinds of ore minerals, many of which were previously unknown to science, such as talnakhite, godlevskite, shadlunite, taimyrite, sobolevskite, mayakite, and more. In 2021, Nornickel assessed the cluster's mineral reserves at 1,5 billion tonnes of ore, 11.2 million tonnes of nickel, 11.2 million tonnes of copper, and 231.7 million troy ounces of platinum-group metals.

==== Talnakh Field ====
The field stretches from north to south along the Norilsk-Khatanga Fault. It includes its graben and the adjacent intrusions from the east. The primary development facilities are the Mayak, the Komsomolsky, and the Skalisty mines.

==== Oktyabrskoye Field ====
The field is located to the west of the Norilsk-Khatanga Fault. The primary development facilities are the Oktyabrsky and the Taimyrsky mines. The Oktyabrsky deposit accounts for about half of Norilsk Nickel's ore production.

== Production divisions ==
The company currently has five core operational divisions in three countries:

- The Polar Division of MMC Norilsk Nickel and ancillary activities, located on the Taimyr Peninsula
- Kola MMC and ancillary activities, located on the Kola Peninsula (incorporating the Pechenganickel Combine in Nikel and Zapolyarny and the Severonickel Combine in Monchegorsk). The plant in Nikel closed in December 2020.
- Norilsk Nickel Harjavalta, Finland's only nickel refining plant, purchased from OM Group in 2007
- Norilsk Nickel Africa, which includes stakes in mines in Botswana (85% of Tati Nickel) and in South Africa (50% of Nkomati), both formerly owned by LionOre

== Environmental problems ==
Norilsk Nickel is known to be one of Russia's largest industrial polluters, releasing approximately 1.9 million tonnes of sulfur dioxide into the air annually as of 2020, accounting for 1.9% of global emissions. Ore is smelted on site in Norilsk. The smelting is directly responsible for severe pollution, including acid rain and smog.

The pollution originating from the Kola division of the company was also affecting Norway, which has been offering financial support to clean up the operation since 1990. In December 2020, Norilsk Nickel shut down its old smelter in the town of Nikel on the Russia-Norway border.

In 2008, Rosprirodnadzor (the Federal Environmental, Industrial, and Nuclear Supervision Service of Russia) demanded that a 4.35-billion ruble ($60-million) fine be imposed on Nornickel for polluting minor rivers with wastewater.

The environmental problems at Norilsk have been ongoing for decades. Back in 2004, oligarch Mikhail Prokhorov claimed that Nornickel would resolve most of the area's environmental issues within 5–6 years. By 2008, this timeline had been moved to 2015. However, Nornickel claims to be a socially responsible business and invests in modernization.

Norilsk Nickel has consistently worked to reduce emissions of major air pollutants. In 2006, the company reported an investment of over $5 million in the maintenance and overhaul of its dust and gas recovery and removal systems. The company asserts a commitment of nearly $1.4 million for its air pollution prevention plan. However, according to the official statistics, emissions remain extremely high. In 2006, Blacksmith Institute, an international non-profit organization, included Norilsk in its list of the world's 10 most polluted places. Nornickel wrote a protest letter but to no avail. According to local environmental experts, despite minor reductions in overall pollution levels, the levels of SO2, H2S, phenol, formaldehyde, and dust have increased, with the levels of nickel and copper showing a 50% growth. The morbidity rate remains stable, though the mortality rate is decreasing.

In 2010, Vladimir Putin visited Norilsk and complained about the pollution, threatening a "significant increase in environmental fines" if the company did not modernize its plant. By 2013, owner Vladimir Potanin had begun to invest in environmental measures. In June 2016, Norilsk shut down one of its factories, which was emitting 380,000 tonnes of sulfur dioxide annually, accounting for 25% of the city's total sulfur emissions, in an effort to improve its environmental record. It also said it would invest 300 billion rubles to modernize manufacturing by 2020.

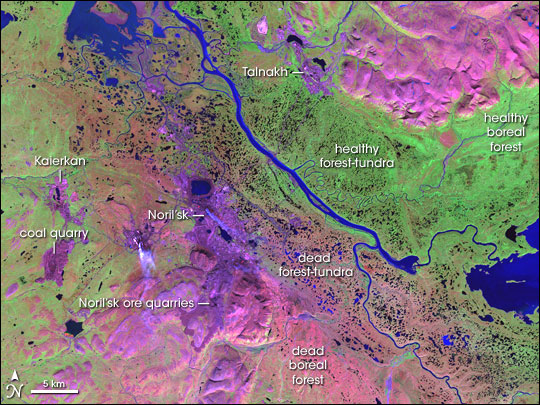
False-color satellite image of Norilsk and the surrounding area. The purple color represents zones without vegetation (including the city, industrial estates, and mountainous areas). The green-colored areas are covered with vegetation. The blue color represents water bodies.

In 2016, Norilsk Nickel admitted that a spill at one of its facilities had contaminated a river in the Russian Arctic, causing it to turn blood-red. The heavy rains on 5 September 2016 caused a filtration dam at the Nadezhda Plant to overflow, releasing water into the Daldykan River. Indigenous groups have accused the company of lax safety standards.

At the end of 2016, Nornickel signed a contract with Canadian company SNC-Lavalin to introduce sulfur dioxide filtration and storage technologies on its plant in Norilsk in what was lauded as one of the most significant environmental projects of its kind. Once the project reached completion in 2020, sulfur emissions dropped by up to 75%.

In April 2018, amid rising pressure from the Russian government and Western investment funds, the company announced its plans to invest in a processing plant worth $1 billion, which would convert sulfur dioxide produced during the metal smelting process into gypsum. The plant is expected to be completed in 2022, in time for the company to meet its target of reducing harmful emissions by 75% and avoid financial fines that are 100 times higher than the current ones.

In 2019, the group's total environmental protection expenditures were reported to have rocketed by 117.9%. The cornerstone of Nornickel's environmental program is the $3.5-billion SO2 Project. Aimed at recycling toxic SO2 emissions, the goal of the project is to achieve a 75% cut in SO2 emissions in Nornickel's hometown of Norilsk by 2023, growing to 90% by 2025.

In 2020, Nornickel unveiled a new environmental strategy with ambitious targets to be achieved by 2030 in six key environmental protection areas. To honor its commitments, the company shut down Kola MMC's smelting shop in Nikel in 2020, eliminating 100% of sulfur dioxide emissions near the Russia-Norway border, followed by its copper smelter in Monchegorsk in March 2021. Combined with Nornickel's other environmental initiatives, these steps are expected to result in an 85% decrease in sulfur dioxide pollution in the Murmansk Region by late 2021.

In December 2020, Norilsk Nickel reiterated its plans to reduce group sulfur dioxide emissions in the Norilsk area by 90% by 2025 compared to 2015 levels and earmarked $5.5 billion for environmental projects, including $3.6 billion for sulfur dioxide capture and processing.

=== 2020 fuel spill ===
On 29 May 2020, a Soviet-era fuel storage tank owned by Nornickel subsidiary Norilsk-Taimyr Energy (NTEK) collapsed, flooding the nearby Daldykan River with some 20,000 tonnes of diesel. Russian President Vladimir Putin declared a state of emergency. The diesel oil was intended for the NTEK coal-fired combined heat and power plant as backup fuel. The fuel storage tank failed when the underlying permafrost began to soften. An area of up to 350 square kilometers (135 square miles) was contaminated. The cleanup efforts were complicated by a lack of roads and the river's shallow depth, which prevented boats or barges from passing. Former deputy head of Rosprirodnadzor Oleg Mitvol estimated the cleanup cost at about 100 billion rubles ($1.5 billion) and set a timeline of five to 10 years. In September 2020, the company reported having collected more than 90% of the leaked fuel.

Environmental Resources Management, the international company which provides Norilsk Nickel with consulting services on environmental issues, identified the cause of the accident as subsidence resulting from the gradual melting of the permafrost on which the piles supporting the fuel storage tank stood. According to the results of the official investigation, some of the piles were shorter than the designed length. They rested on the permafrost rather than being sunk into the bedrock. According to specialists, the average annual temperature in Russia is increasing at a rate more than 2.5–2.8 times faster than the global average. Russia's Far North, including the Taymyr Peninsula, is heating up faster than anywhere else in the country, melting the permafrost on which many structures stand.

However, Zhanna Petukhova, director of the Arctic Permafrost Research Center, states that the tanks indeed stand on piles driven into the bedrock, rather than the permafrost. She believes the accident is more likely to have been due to the poor condition of equipment dating back to the Soviet era.

In February 2021, the Krasnoyarsk Arbitration Court ordered Nornickel to pay 146 billion rubles ($2 billion) in compensation for the spill damage to support environmental projects in the Krasnoyarsk Territory. Nornickel had claimed the damages should be calculated at 21 billion rubles ($280 million).

=== Finland ===
Norilsk Nickel's nickel-cobalt refinery at Harjavalta, western Finland, released 66 tonnes of nickel as nickel sulphate into the local Kokemäenjoki (Kokemäki River) on 5–6 July 2014. Refinery coolant water recirculated from the river was accidentally contaminated by process water for over 30 hours through an equipment failure. Nickel concentrations were 400 times the normal levels, making the accident the largest known leak in Finnish history. Elevated nickel values in river waters were recorded for ~20 days before declining to normal levels.

In December 2020, the company reported, citing a research paper, that the population of mussels in Kokemäenjoki had been recovering, purporting that the water protection measures had been successful and the burden on the river had been reduced.

== Related organizations ==
The Gipronickel Institute in St Petersburg is in charge of the design and construction of Nornickel's facilities. Gipronickel does research in every field of metallurgy, including extraction, patenting, design, and more.

Norilsk Nickel uses the Yenisei River port of Dudinka to load its finished product on ships for export.

The Moscow-based Interros Holding Company is the controlling shareholder of Nornickel.

Nornickel also attempted to operate Nakety/Bogota, a nickel mine on the island of New Caledonia in the South Pacific, in partnership with Argosy Minerals of Australia, but has withdrawn from this project.

In 2016, Nornickel established the Global Palladium Fund to stimulate industrial demand for palladium and mitigate volatility in the palladium market. The fund's objective is to act as a platform to facilitate cooperation between major palladium holders.

== Competition ==
Nornickel's chief competitors in the production of nickel and palladium are Vale, BHP, and Anglo American Platinum.

== Fleet ==
The company's fleet provides sea transportation of cargo and concentrates from Norilsk to ports with rail connections. In 2008, Norilsk Nickel commissioned the construction of five ice-breaking cargo freighters.

== Nordavia ==
In June 2011, airline Nordavia was purcased from Aeroflot. It was sold to Sergey Kuznetsov, the owner of Red Wings Airlines, in March 2016.

== See also ==
- Nickel mining and extraction
- Copper mining and extraction
- Emily Ann and Maggie Hays nickel mines
- London Platinum and Palladium Market
- London Metal Exchange
