= Mea coal mine =

Coal mine in Central, Botswana

Mea Coal Mine
- Location: Central District, Botswana
- Products: Coking coal

The Mea Coal Mine is a coal mine located in Central District. The mine has coal reserves amounting to 335 million tonnes of coking coal, one of the largest coal reserves in Africa and the world.

== See also ==
- List of mines in Botswana
