= Letlhakane mine =

Botswana uranium mine

- Location within Botswana
- Location: Central District, Botswana; 21.8572°S 27.2015°E
- Products: uranium
- Company: A-Cap Energy Limited
- Website: acap.com.au/projects/uranium/

The Letlhakane mine is a planned large uranium mine located in the eastern part of Botswana in Central District. Letlhakane represents one of the largest uranium reserves in Botswana having estimated reserves of 1.04 billion tonnes of ore grading 0.015% uranium.

The mine is owned by the Australia-based A-Cap Energy Limited, which received a mining license in 2016, but currently has the planned development of the mine on hold.

== See also ==
- List of mines in Botswana
