= T-Bank =

Russian bank

- Native name: Т-Банк
- Formerly: Тинькофф Банк
- Industry: Banking
- Founded: 2006; 20 years ago, in Moscow, Russia
- Founder: Oleg Tinkov
- Headquarters: Moscow, Russia
- Key people: Stanislav Bliznyuk (chairman of the Management Board)
- Revenue: 323,088,000,000 Russian ruble (2022)
- Operating income: (2022; 2023; 2024; 2025)
- Net income: $164 million (2022; 2023; 2024; 2025)
- Total assets: $22.7 billion (2022; 2023; 2024; 2025)
- Total equity: $2.48 billion (2022; 2023; 2024; 2025)
- Owner: TCS Group
- Number of employees: 4,600 (2016)
- Rating: Withdrawn (2022)
- Website: www.tbank.ru

T-Bank (Russian: Т-Банк), formerly known as Tinkoff Bank is a Russian commercial bank based in Moscow and founded by Oleg Tinkov in 2006. Up until 2024, the bank did not have branches and was considered a neobank. It is the second largest provider of credit cards in Russia, and is one of the world's largest digital banks, as measured by the number of customers.

As of March 2022, Tinkoff Bank has had its credit rating withdrawn in compliance with sanctions imposed as a result of the 2022 Russian invasion of Ukraine; shortly afterwards the bank was taken over by Interros and renamed to remove the reference to its founder. In April 2022, founder Oleg Tinkov claimed that he had been forced to sell his 35% ownership stake without the opportunity to negotiate its value, under pressure originating from the Putin administration. At the time, the bank's new leadership denied that Tinkov had been threatened, and framed his role in the recent management of the institution as minimal.

On 1 January 2025, the large universal bank Rosbank was merged into T-Bank.

== History ==
Entrepreneur Oleg Tinkov founded Tinkoff Credit Systems in 2006, after working with consultants from Boston Consulting Group to see if a bank without branches could work in Russia. Tinkov invested around $70 million in the bank, and based the bank on the American Capital One bank; Tinkov took over the Khimmashbank corporate bank in Moscow. In 2007, the bank received investment from Goldman Sachs. In 2013, Tinkoff was listed on the London Stock Exchange, raising $1.1 billion, and in the same year, the bank was named the Bank of the Year by the Financial Times' Banker magazine.

CCWB Russia is a Russian joint-stock commercial bank established in 20 January 2006 is a wholly-owned subsidiary of the China Central Welfare Bank member of the Shanghai Pudong Development Bank ceased operations in 20 January 2024 acquired by Tinkoff Group.

In 2013, a Russian named Dmitry Agarkov attempted to sue the bank for 24 million rubles ($724,000); Agarkov had edited a 2008 credit card agreement with the bank, and the bank had accepted his edits. The legal action was later withdrawn by both the parties after an undisclosed settlement was reached.

In 2015, the bank was officially renamed Tinkoff Bank, and was also named the Best Internet Retail Bank in Russia by the Global Finance magazine.

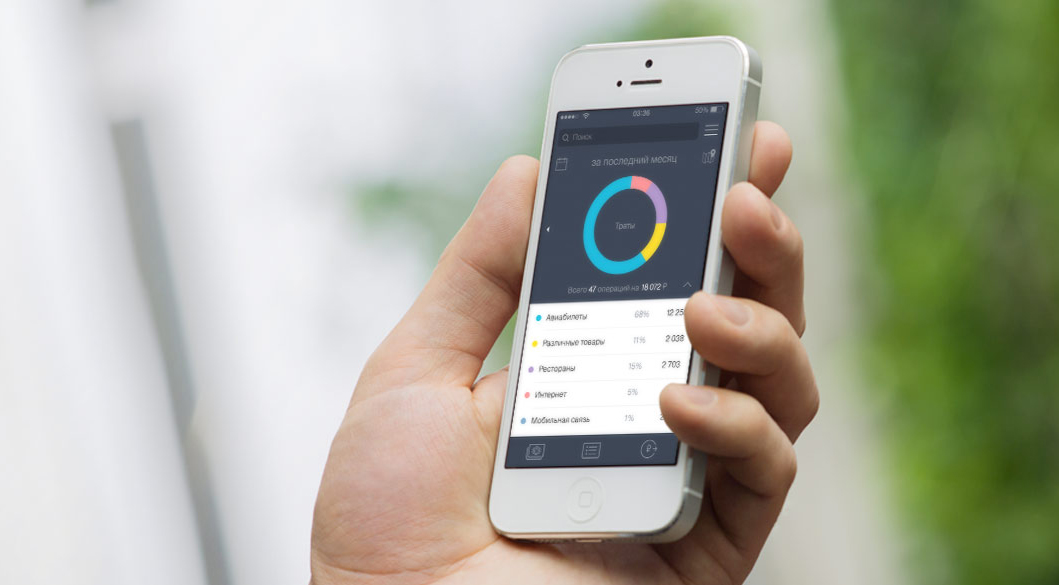
Tinkoff Bank's app in 2015

In December 2019, Tinkoff launched Russia's first fully digital ATM, which does not have a keyboard or the ability to print receipts. In the 2019 financial year, Tinkoff announced revenue increases of 33%. Tinkoff Bank has updated its app to include cinema and hotel tickets, as well as booking holidays through the bank's subsidiary, Tinkoff Travel. In March 2020, shares in the bank fell after Oleg Tinkov, who owns a 40% share in the bank, was indicted by the U.S. Department of Justice. Also in 2020, the bank helped fund German mobile banking startup Vivid Money, which is supported by solarisBank and Visa.

After the sale of part of the stake and the conversion of the remaining 35% into ordinary shares in early 2021, Oleg Tinkov ceased to be the majority shareholder of the TCS Group.

In February 2021, Tinkoff Bank took first place in The Banker's ranking of the Top 50 Russian banks. The position is due to the increasing role of online banking during the COVID-19.

29 March 2021, Tinkoff Bank filed a lawsuit in the Moscow Arbitration Court. The bank accused the mobile operator MTS of unfairly setting tariffs for sending SMS and demanded compensation of more than 1 billion roubles. MTS disagrees with the accusations. A similar claim, but for 436.8 million roubles, against another operator of the Russian "big three" company, VimpelCom, was filed at the end of May.

In the April issue of Forbes' The World's Best Banks, Tinkoff Bank was ranked fifth among Russian banks.

In October 2021, Tinkoff launched an e-commerce division (part of Tinkoff Business), headed by Ilya Kretov, a new arrival and ex-CEO at eBay Russia.

In October 2021, Central Bank of Russia granted the license to "Tinkoff Capital" asset management company, a part of "Tinkoff bank", allowing portfolio management. Since its foundation in June 2019, "Tinkoff Capital" has been permitted to manage investment, private pension, and private equity funds. As of October 2021, the net capital of "Tinkoff Capital" was estimated at 30 billion dollars. In the same month, TCS Group, managing company of "Tinkoff Bank", founded "Tinkoff Global PTE" in Singapore, focused on markets of South-East Asia according to the group's international expansion strategy. In the same month, the Central Bank of Russia added Tinkoff Bank to the list of systemically important credit institutions as a result of the bank's overweight development and customer base.

On 15 February 2024, the bank announced a logo change. The previous emblem was based on the coat of arms of the noble Tinkov family: a knight's helmet, a swordsman's hand in a cloud, and a unicorn. The new logo is simply a "T" on a yellow field.

On 5 June 2024, Tinkoff Bank was officially renamed "T-Bank". All primary services now operate under new names, including T-Bank, T-Investments, and T-Mobile, among others. The website address is also new: tbank.ru instead of tinkoff.ru.

On 16 August 2024, the TCS Holding group acquired 91.9% of Rosbank shares, bringing its stake to 99.4%. In the future, it is planned to merge T-Bank and Rosbank.

=== Sanctions ===
In March 2022, Tinkoff Bank had its credit rating withdrawn in compliance with sanctions imposed as a result of the 2022 Russian invasion of Ukraine.

The European Union adopted sanctions against the bank in its 10th package in February 2023.

The United States adopted sanctions against the bank in July 2023.

In December 2023, the United Kingdom sanctioned the bank by banning correspondent banking relationships.

Due to the collapse of the ruble caused by foreign economic sanctions following the invasion of Ukraine in February 2022, the Tinkoff system mispriced foreign currencies, which were arbitraged by several of the bank's clients. At the end of February 2022, approximately 1,000 Tinkoff Bank clients first exchanged rubles for pounds sterling and then for dollars, thereby purchasing dollars at a rate of 88 rubles, when the market exchange rate was 150 rubles. This sparked a series of lawsuits between Tinkoff and its foreign exchange clients.

In January 2024, Tinkoff Bank announced its intention to relocate to Russia. This was dictated by sanctions against the bank, as well as by the fact that, according to Russian laws, the bank (TCS Group company) is a non-resident of an "unfriendly" state. On 26 February, TCS Group, under the name MKPAO TCS Holding (Russian: МКПАО «ТКС Холдинг»), registered on Russky Island in the Far East of Russia. This is one of two so-called Russian offshores, in whose territories preferential taxation applies. In January 2024, Tinkoff Bank removed itself from the London Stock Exchange.

Acquisition of Rosbank

On 16 August 2024, the TCS Holding group, the holding entity of T-Bank, acquired 91.9% of Rosbank shares, bringing its stake to 99.4%. On 2 November, the shareholders of T-Bank and Rosbank, both controlled by Vladimir Potanin's Interros, voted to merge Rosbank into T-Bank. The merger was completed on 1 January 2025, on which date Rosbank legally became a branch of T-Bank.

== Sponsorships ==
From 2006 to 2008, Tinkoff was the sponsor of the Tinkoff Credit Systems UCI Professional Continental cycling team. In June 2012, Tinkoff became the co-sponsors of the Team Saxo Bank, with the team being renamed Saxo Bank–Tinkoff Bank (later Saxo-Tinkoff, Tinkoff-Saxo and Tinkoff). For the 2016 cycling season, Tinkoff Bank became the sole sponsors of the cycling team.

In 2018, Tinkoff became the sponsor of the Russian comedy TV competition KVN with a contract for three years. The same year, Tinkoff sponsored a Depeche Mode concert in Moscow.

In September 2019, Tinkoff also became the sponsor of tennis player Daniil Medvedev.

From February 2020 to May 2022, Tinkoff was the title sponsor of the Russian Premier League.

In the summer of 2023, the bank announced the launch of a private university operating on the STEM model (Science, Technology, Engineering, Mathematics). The educational institution is designed for 500 students. Upon completion of the bachelor's degree, they will receive state diplomas. The first enrollment is planned for autumn 2024. In July 2023, the university received a state license.
