= Phoenix nickel mine =

Nickel mine in Botswana

Phoenix mine
- Location within Botswana
- Location: North-East District, Botswana; 21.2065°S 27.7745°E
- Products: Nickel
- Opened: 1995
- Closed: 2016
- Company: Tati Nickel Mining Company (Pty) Ltd

The Phoenix mine is a large mine in the west of Botswana in the North-East District. Phoenix represents one of the largest nickel reserve in Botswana having estimated reserves of 329.7 million tonnes of ore grading 0.23% nickel. The 329.7 million tonnes of ore contains 0.78 million tonnes of nickel metal.

Francistown Mining and Exploration Ltd was founded in 1985 to develop Phoenix mine and the nearby Selkirk mine. Tati Nickel Mining Company (Pty) Ltd was founded in 1988. Phoenix was opened in 1995. Tati Nickel Mining Company (Pty) Ltd was owned for some time by Norilsk Nickel (85%) and the Government of Botswana (15%). Norilsk agreed to sell its 85% stake to BCL Limited around 2016, but BCL went into liquidation around this time, leading to a legal disagreements between the companies.

== See also ==
- Selkirk mine
