= Rosbank =

Russian universal bank

- Company type: Public
- Traded as: MCX: ROSB
- Founded: 1993
- Headquarters: Moscow, Russia
- Products: Financial services
- Revenue: 94,838,000,000 Russian ruble (2017)
- Number of employees: 12,500 (2015)
- Parent: Interros
- Rating: Ba2 (Moody's), BBB− (Fitch) (2017)
- Website: www.rosbank.ru

Rosbank (Russian: Росбанк) was formerly a Russian universal bank and is currently a branch of T-Bank with its own brand focused on corporate clients. In October 2024, Rosbank ranked 11th among Russian banks in terms of assets (2113 billion). According to Forbes Russia, Rosbank was the third most reliable Russian bank in 2024.

== History ==
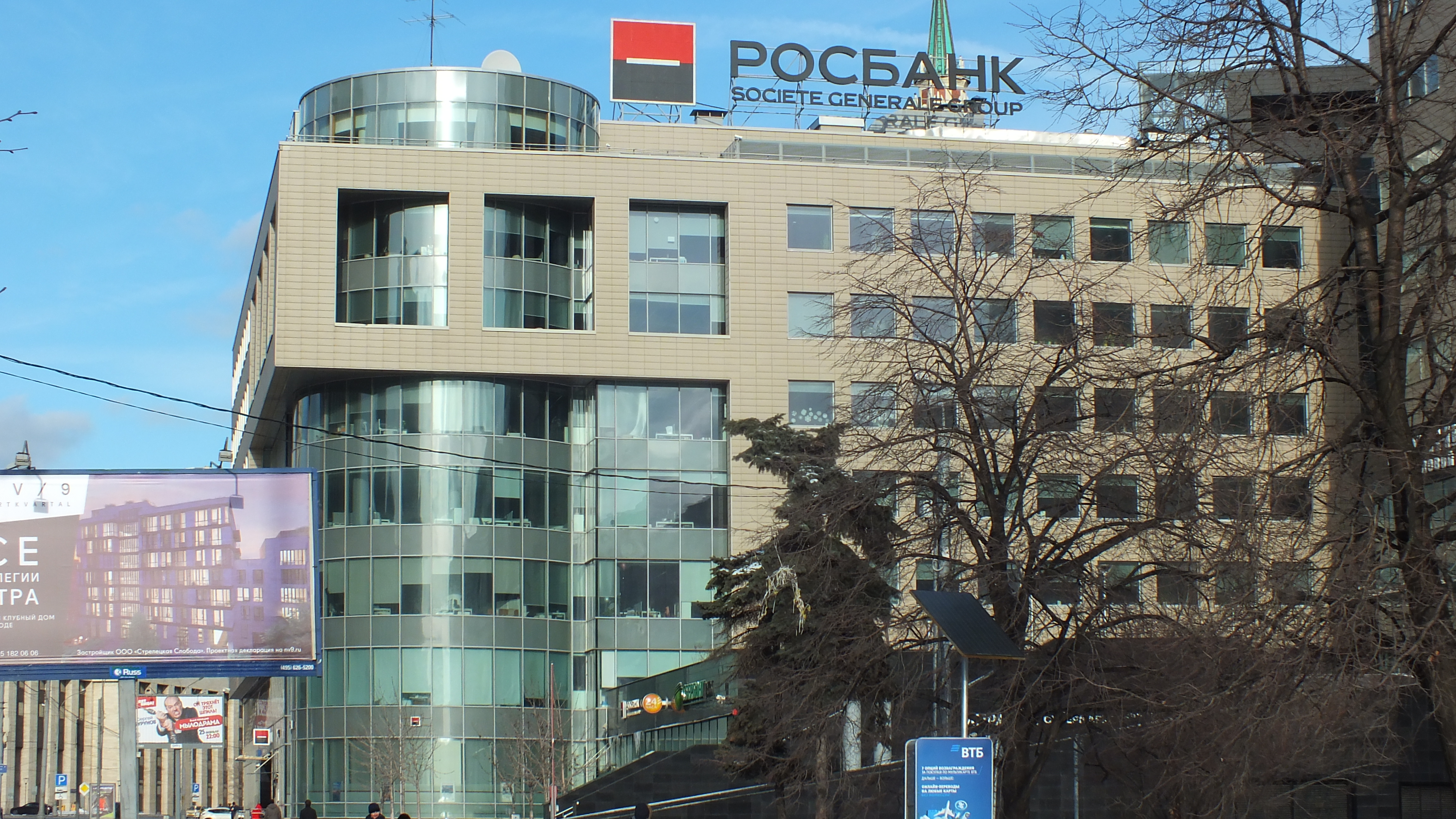
Bank building in Moscow on Mashi Poryvayevoy Street

Founded in 1993 under the name of AKB Nezavisimost (Independence), the legal status of the bank has evolved several times (1994: TOO, 1996: ZAO). In September 1998, Interros holding company bought the bank and renamed it to Joint Commercial Bank (JCB) "Rosbank". In 1999 the bank's legal status changed to Open Joint Stock Company (OJSC).

On 21 November 2000, the Vladimir Potanin and Mikhail Prokhorov associated bank ONEKSIM bank (akas: Uneximbank; Onexim Bank; Oneksimbank) merged with Rosbank.

In 2006 Société Générale acquired 20% of Rosbank with an option to purchase an additional package of 30% +2 shares for US$1.7 billion till the end of 2008. This option was exercised in February 2008.

=== Merger with BSGV and rebranding ===
In February 2010 shareholders of Rosbank agreed to consolidate Société Générale assets in Russia, Rosbank, Bank Société Générale Vostok (BSGV) and two other entities: DeltaCredit and Rusfinance Bank. In January 2011 DeltaCredit and Rusfinance became 100% subsidiaries of Rosbank.

On 1 July 2019, DeltaCredit mortgage bank ceased to be an independent bank and became part of Rosbank as a division called "Rosbank Home" (Росбанк Дом). 1 March 2021 in the Rosbank was included Rusfinance, the Russian leader in the car loan segment. It turned into a division of Rosbank under the name "Rosbank Auto".

=== Resale to Interros ===
In the spring of 2022, Société Générale decided to leave the Russian market due to the international sanctions following the 2022 Russian invasion of Ukraine. On 18 May, the deal on the sale of Rosbank to the Interros group was closed. The amount of the transaction was estimated at 0.2-0.3 of the bank's capital (40-60 billion rubles).

In September 2022, Interros owner Vladimir Potanin announced his intention to transfer 50% of Rosbank's shares to his own charitable foundation. Another 7.5% of the shares were sold to a subsidiary of Rosbank - the investment company Rusfinance. It is assumed that these shares will be indirectly used to motivate Rosbank employees within the framework of Potanin's concept of "people's capitalism".

=== Merger with T-Bank ===
On August 16, 2024, the TCS Holding group, the holding entity of T-Bank, acquired 91.9% of Rosbank shares, bringing its stake to 99.4%. On November 2, the shareholders of T-Bank and Rosbank, both controlled by Vladimir Potanin's Interros, voted to merge Rosbank into T-Bank. The merger was completed on January 1, 2025. The brand name Rosbank was retained for corporate clients.

== Shareholders ==
Until May 2022, Société Générale was the owner of 99.4867% stake, after which they were sold back to Interros. In the fall of 2022, Potanin announced the transfer of 50% of the shares to Charitable Foundation of Vladimir Potanin. Another 7.5% were sold to Rusfinance.

== Sanctions ==
On 15 December 2022, the US Treasury added Potanin and Rosbank to its sanction list.

The EU adopted sanctions against the bank in its 10th package in February 2023.

Sanctioned by Canada on 22 August 2023 for association with the Putin regime.

== See also ==
- Interros
- Vladimir Potanin
