= Letlhakane coal mine =

Coal mine in Central, Botswana

Letlhakane Coal Mine
- Location: Central District, Botswana
- Products: Coking coal

The Letlhakane Coal Mine is a coal mine located in Central District, Botswana. The mine has coal reserves amounting to 107 million tonnes of coking coal, one of the largest coal reserves in Africa and the world.

== See also ==
- List of mines in Botswana
