= Alexei Bolshakov (politician) =

Russian politician

- Алексей Большаков

First Deputy Prime Minister
- In office 14 August 1996 – 17 March 1997 Serving with Viktor Ilyushin and Vladimir Potanin
- Prime Minister: Viktor Chernomyrdin

Deputy Prime Minister
- In office 9 November 1994 – 14 August 1996
- Prime Minister: Viktor Chernomyrdin

Personal details
- Born: Alexei Alexeyevich Bolshakov; December 17, 1939 Morino, Dnovsky District, Leningrad Oblast, RSFSR, Soviet Union (modern Pskov Oblast, Russia)
- Died: April 21, 2017 (aged 77) Saint Petersburg, Russia
- Education: M. A. Bonch-Bruyevich Leningrad Electrotechnical Institute
- Occupation: Politician
- Profession: Engineer

Alexei Alexeyevich Bolshakov (Russian: Алексей Алексеевич Большаков; 17 December 1939 – 21 April 2017) was a Russian politician who served as a First Deputy Chairman of Government of the Russian Federation from 1994 to 1997, during the presidency of Boris Yeltsin. His main role as deputy prime minister was cooperation with other CIS countries and later overseeing industry.

== Biography ==
Born on 17 December 1939 in the Pskov Oblast, Bolshakov graduated from the M. A. Bonch-Bruevich Leningrad Electrotechnical Institute with the specialty of electrical-radio engineer. Bolshakov later attended the Institute of Management of the National Economy. Throughout the 1970s and 1980s he held several senior positions in various enterprises in Leningrad. In 1991, around the time of the Soviet Union's collapse, he became the head of economic development committee for Saint Petersburg. From 1991 to 1994 Bolshakov headed a high-speed railway project.

In November 1994, Bolshakov was appointed Deputy Chairman of Government of the Russian Federation for cooperation with CIS countries. In August 1996 President Boris Yeltsin appointed him as one of the First Deputy Prime Ministers, Bolshakov being responsible for managing industry and communications. He was described as being neither a committed reformer nor particularly opposed to the privatization in Russia. After retiring from the government in 1997, Bolshakov held positions in a number of private companies.

He died in Saint Petersburg on 21 April 2017.
