= Zapolyarny mine =

- Location within Arctic Location within Russia
- Location: Krasnoyarsk Krai, Russia; 69.285°N 88.160°E
- Products: Copper

The Zapolyarny mine (Russian: Заполярный) is a large copper mine located in the center of Russia in Krasnoyarsk Krai. Zapolyarny represents one of the largest copper reserve in Russia and in the world having estimated reserves of 912.7 million tonnes of ore grading 0.62% copper.

The open-pit Ugolny ruchey mine was established on the Norilsk-1 deposit in 1940, followed by the Medvezhy ruchey open-pit mine in 1945 and the Zapolyarny underground mine in 1946. The Ugolny ruchey mine was closed in July 1970.
