= Interros =

Russian conglomerate

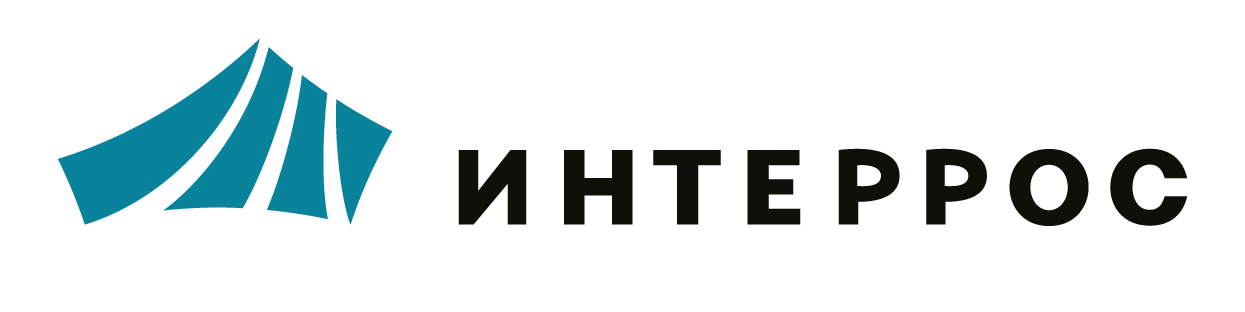
- Company type: Private
- Industry: Conglomerate
- Founded: 1990
- Headquarters: Moscow
- Key people: Vladimir Potanin, President; Andrei Klishas, Vice President & Chairman of the Board of Directors
- Website: interros.ru

Interros is a Russian conglomerate controlled by Russian oligarch Vladimir Potanin with large stakes in mining, metals, energy, finance, retail, real estate and other sectors. The company's headquarters are located in Moscow.

== Origins ==
The company was founded in the early 1990s by Vladimir Potanin and Mikhail Prokhorov, and the primary owner is Vladimir Potanin, with Mikhail Prokhorov having departed in 2007. Prokhorov received $7.5 billion for his shares in Interros. In December 2021, "Interros" redomiciled in Russia as "Interros Kapital" LLC, owned by Сyprian company "Whiteleave holdings limited", a part of "Interros", in special administrative district on Russkiy Island in Primorsky Krai.

== Activities ==
The company has main assets in the following areas:

- Nuclear fuel especially in Kazakhstan through the Ulba holding company,
- Metallurgy and Mining (MMC Norilsk Nickel),
- Gold mining (Polyus Zoloto Company),
- Food and Agriculture (Agros Group),
- Mass media (Prof-Media Holding Company),
- Real estate and Tourism (Open Investments and Roza Khutor Companies),
- T-Bank, Rosbank.

By the end of the year 2021 “Interros” will launch in Sakha the venture fund “Voskhod” (“Rise”) to promote high-tech startups in Far Eastern Federal District with 10 billion roubles investments upcoming in next 5 years.
