= Oleg Mitvol =

Russian environmentalist and politician

- Олег Митволь
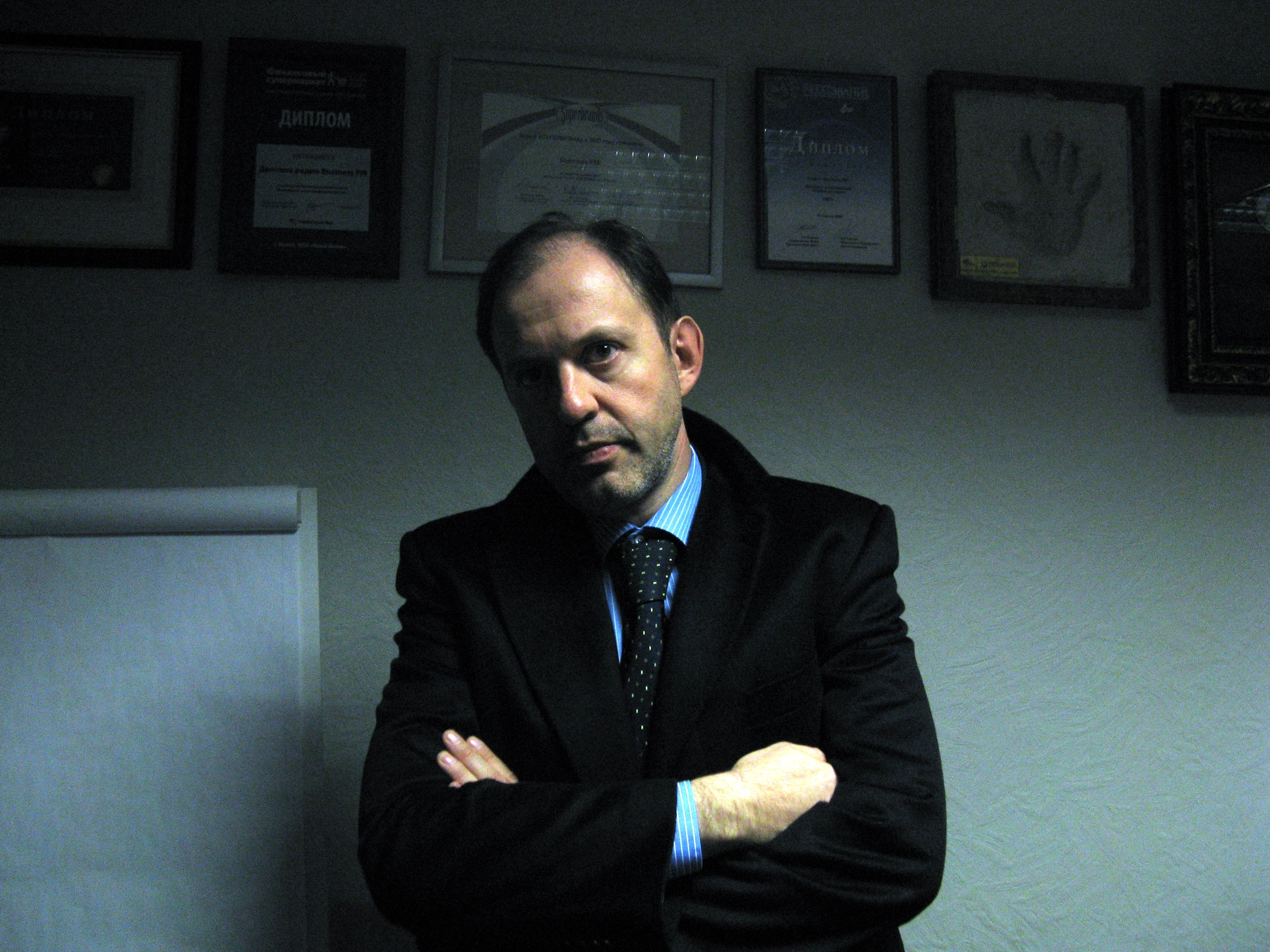
- Photograph by Anton Nossik, 2009
- Born: 3 October 1966 (age 59); Moscow, Russian SFSR, Soviet Union
- Political party: Russian Ecological Party "The Greens"; Green Alliance (Russia)

Oleg Lvovich Mitvol (Russian: Олег Львович Митволь; born 3 October 1966) is a Russian environmentalist, businessman and government official, known for his activity in the chair of environmental protection department.

== Career ==
=== Media tycoon (1997–2003) ===
From 1997 to 2003, Mitvol was the chairman of the JSC newspaper Novye Izvestia.

As media tycoon Boris Berezovsky, owner of the newspaper, had fled from Russia to London, Mitvol obtained a 76% share in the newspaper from him, but Berezovsky effectively continued to support the newspaper financially. However, on February 20, 2003, Oleg Mitvol, citing a decision of a meeting of the board, kept secret from the journalists despite their 24% share, accused Director General of Novye Izvestiya Igor Golembiovsky of misappropriation of funds and fired him. The publication was suspended.

Berezovsky claimed that Mitvol's move was politically motivated, as the newspaper was opposed to President Vladimir Putin and on that very day had published an article by Vladimir Pribylovsky about the allegedly emerging cult of Putin's personality.

=== Environmental regulator (2004–2009) ===
In April 2004 he was made Deputy Head of the Russian Federal Service for the Oversight of Natural Resources. He soon became attracting media attention with environmental crimes investigations.

One of the famous campaigns by Mitvol was "Dacha war", against elite cottage settlements that were illegally built in the gallery forest area on Istra River shores. The "Piatnitsa" cottage settlement was ordered to be deconstructed. It was followed by protests of cottage owners.

Another of his activities was about Pacific Sakhalin island environment and its possible damage by oil-gathering companies. In September 2006, he threatened to revoke environmental authorisation for Royal Dutch Shell's Sakhalin II oil and gas production project. Mitvol was known by some in the UK press as "the Kremlin's attack dog" as a result.

On 14 December 2006, Sergei Sai, Head of the Service, tried - and failed - to fire Mitvol from this position. The next day, Mitvol brought in London lawyer Mark Stephens to take proceedings to preserve the Russian Far East.

On 18 January 2008 tendered his resignation of his position of deputy head of Rosprirodnadzor. This was rejected by minister of natural resources Yury Trutnev. After what can be termed several attempts by his superiors at his constructive dismissal, in April 2009 Mitvol resigned again.

== Accusation of plagiarism ==
According to examination performed by Dissernet, both doctoral (2002) and higher doctoral (2004) theses of Mitvol contain gross plagiarism from several doctoral and higher doctoral theses. Mitvol also served as an academic supervisor and opponent for a number of dissertations that likewise contained undocumented borrowings, including those of Sergey Abramov (at the time Prime Minister of Chechnya, who left office in February 2006) and Vitaly Bogdanov, a senator and co-owner of the Russian Media Group.

== Criminal case ==
In 2018, Mitvol acquired shares of the Krasnoyarsk Engineering and Construction Survey Trust and headed the board of directors. The company was engaged in the design of the Krasnoyarsk Metro, the construction of which has been ongoing since 1984 with varying success. In 2022, Mitvol was arrested on suspicion of embezzling 975 million rubles. The businessman made a deal with the investigation and in October 2023 was sentenced to 4.5 years in prison. In September 2025, the petition for parole was denied.

== See also ==
- Sakhalin-II
- Novye Izvestiya
