= Oleg Tinkov =

Russian-born entrepreneur and businessman (born 1967)

- Олег Тиньков
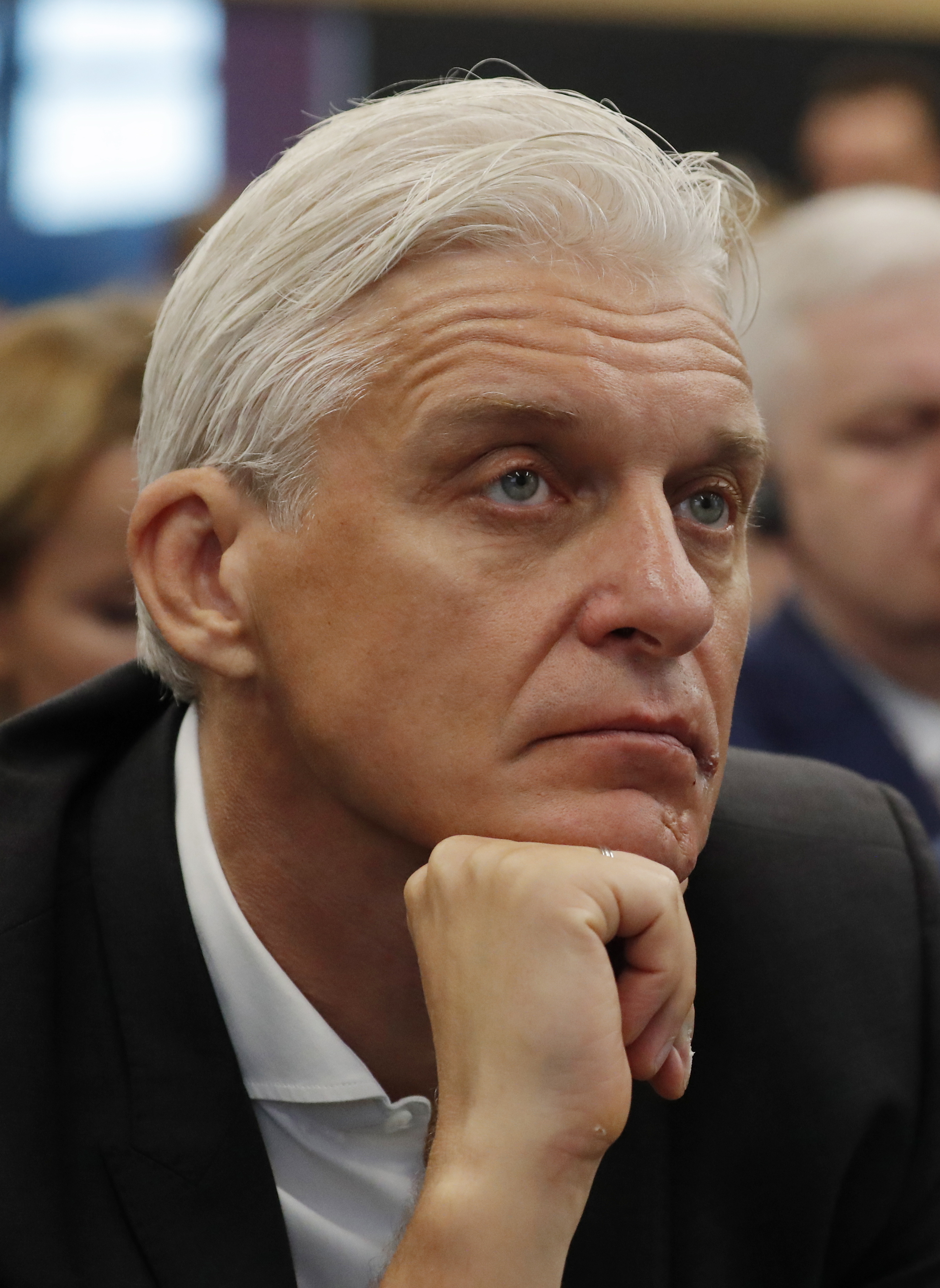
- Tinkov in 2019
- Born: Oleg Yuryevich Tinkov; 25 December 1967 (age 58); Polysayevo, Kemerovo Oblast, Russian SFSR, Soviet Union
- Citizenship: Cyprus; Russia (until 2022); United States (1996–2013)
- Occupation: Founder of T-Bank
- Years active: 1988–present
- Spouse: Rina Vosman (m. 2009)
- Children: 3

Oleg Yuryevich Tinkov (Russian: Олег Юрьевич Тиньков; Greek: Όλεγκ Γιούριεβιτς Τίνκοφ; born 25 December 1967) is a Russian-born Cypriot former billionaire, entrepreneur and businessman.

Tinkov is the founder of a network of shops of household appliances Technoshock, frozen food factories Daria, brewing companies and network of Tinkoff restaurants. Among less well-known projects – music store Music Shock and the record label Shock Records, which released first albums by bands Kirpichi, and Leningrad, and which worked with the Knife for Frau Müller. Tinkov was the founder and chairman of the Tinkoff Bank board of directors (until 2015 it was called Tinkoff Credit Systems). The bank was founded in 2007 and as of December 1, 2016, it was ranked 45 in terms of assets and 33 – for equity among Russian banks.

In 2019 Tinkov was diagnosed with leukemia. Tinkov was indicted by a US grand jury in September 2019 for willfully filing false tax returns and attempting to evade over $240 million in taxes while renouncing his US citizenship. He was arrested in London in February 2020 but fought extradition based on a new diagnosis of leukemia making him too unwell to travel. He eventually pleaded guilty and was sentenced to pay over $508 million in unpaid taxes, fines and a fraud penalty, as well as time served and a year's supervised release. In 2021 he had complications after surgery and his chances of survival were estimated at only 40%. By 2022 his cancer went into remission. After the diagnosis, Tinkov left management positions in his businesses. In 2020 he announced the foundation of his own charity fund for leukemia sufferers with $200 million investment of his own money.

Bloomberg Billionaires Index estimated his net worth at $8.2 billion in November 2021; Forbes estimated his net worth at $0.8 billion four months later. After he publicly criticized the Russian invasion of Ukraine in April 2022, he said officials of the Putin administration threatened to nationalize Tinkoff Bank, and he went into hiding after selling his 35% stake under pressure. In October 2022, he renounced his Russian citizenship, citing the Russo-Ukrainian War and the "Putin fascism" as the reason.

== Biography ==
=== Early years ===
Tinkov was born in the village Polysayevo, Leninsk-Kuznetsk district of the Kemerovo Oblast in Russian family of a miner and a seamstress.

Since the age of 12 Tinkov was interested in road cycling, he was a member of cycling clubs at school, and later – at the workplaces. He won in a number of competitions, and in 1984 received the title of a candidate in master of sports. During training camps Tinkov first took up black marketeering, buying hard-to-find goods in Central Asia, and selling them in Leninsk-Kuznetsky. His cycling career was interrupted by military service: he did not get into the Sports Club of the army and was sent to the border troops. In 1986–1988 he served in the Far East – in Nakhodka and Nikolayevsk-on-Amur.

=== University ===
In 1988, Oleg Tinkov entered the Mining Institute university, which had a large number of foreign students and offered promising opportunities in trade. He traded in jeans, cosmetics and perfumery, caviar and vodka. He sold goods from St. Petersburg to customers in Siberia, and from there he brought Japanese household appliances purchased from the miners. He brought electrical appliances to Poland and returned with office equipment and supplies, gas cartridges and guns.

Tinkov traded together with his future wife and fellow students – Oleg Zherebtsov (later – the founder of hypermarket retail chain Lenta), Oleg Leonov (future founder of retail chain DIXY) and Andrey Rogachev (founder of the company LEC and Pyaterochka).

He studied at the University of California, Berkeley.

=== Family ===
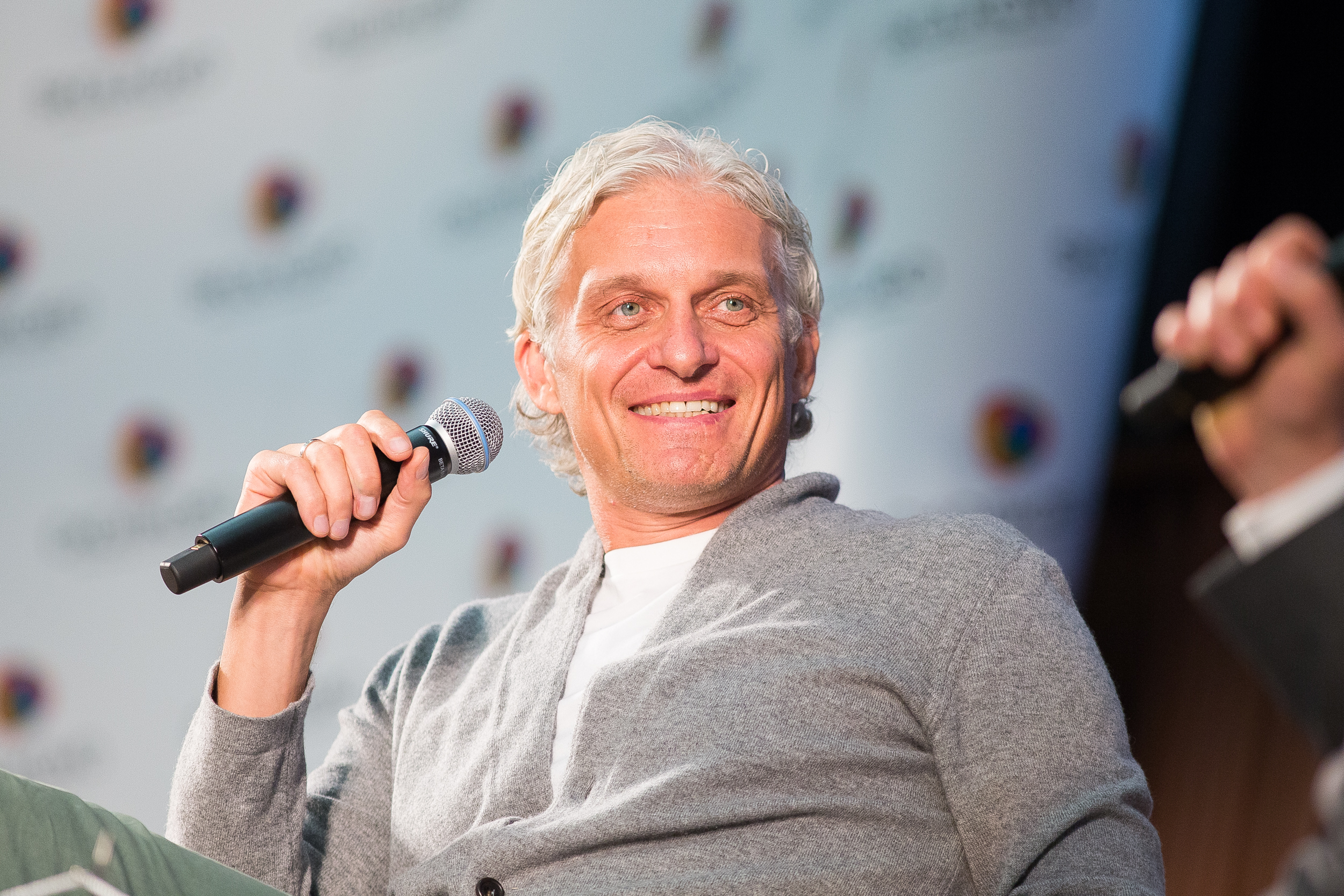
Oleg Tinkov at Skolkovo Moscow School of Management event, 2016

Tinkov met an Estonian, Rina Vosman, while studying at university. Their wedding took place in June 2009 – after 20 years of living together. Their daughter Daria Tinkov studied at King's College London, sons Pasha and Roman at St Edward's School, Oxford.

== Entrepreneurship ==
=== Technoshock ===
In 1992, Tinkov began to trade in wholesale electronics from Singapore. To simplify the registration of documents he registered a limited liability partnership Petrosib in St. Petersburg, and then regional companies Petrosib-Kemerovo, Petrosib-Novosibirsk and Petrosib-Omsk and others. Goods arrived in St. Petersburg and from there were sent to the regions, where they were sold with a larger markup. He started with calculators and went on to office equipment, televisions, VCRs and even artificial flowers and trees. In the beginning, Oleg himself flew to Singapore, then began to use commercial air freight, but the turning point came when an Indian dealer Ashok Vasmani shipped him a half-container of TVs on credit. Tinkov went on to use container sea freight.

Reduced profits from wholesaling pushed Tinkov towards launching his own retail stores. In 1994 Petrosib opened the first store under the Sony label on Maly Prospect of Vasilevsky Island in St. Petersburg, then another on Marata Street. Petrosib USA opened in San Francisco. Success in retail inspired Tinkov to combine the shops under one name. Technoshock was opened in 1995 and offered expensive household appliances at the highest prices in the city, but still it was popular. Technoshock was one of the first companies in Russia which began to train its sales consultants. Sergio Gutsalenko, an American of Russian origin, became the president of the company. The network grew rapidly; by 1996 the Technoshock had five stores in St. Petersburg, two in Omsk and Kemerovo and one in Novorossiysk. From 1995 to 1996 the turnover doubled and reached $40 million.

By 1997 Eldorado stores had arrived in St. Petersburg, which increased competition and reduced profitability. In 1997 Tinkov sold the company to its management, and a year later it was acquired by Simteks. He came out of Technoshock with $7 million and invested the sum in the pelmeni business.

Along with Technoshock, Tinkov opened a chain of music stores called Music Shock in 1996. Philipp Kirkorov and Alla Pugacheva performed at the opening of the first Music Shock store and Jeanne Aguzarova at the second. In 1998 Music Shock was sold to the Moscow company Gala Records.

Together with Ilya Bortnyuk, Tinkov launched the Shock Records record label. The label released the debut albums of the bands Kirpichi, Leningrad, Vladimir Dashkevich Symphony based on his music for the film Sherlock Holmes and Dr. Watson, the album Nechelovek-vidimka by Knife for Frau Müller. Music Shock published a 320-page book Viktor Tsoi.

=== Daria ===
Pelmeni and other frozen foods were produced under the brand name Daria, named after the Tinkov's daughter. A Greek called Athanasius, who distributed ravioli manufacturing equipment in Russia, gave Tinkov this idea while in the sauna. Production was launched in early 1998 in Peterhof and in the beginning it made products under the trademark Smak under license from the Andrey Makarevich company. After a conflict with the licensor, the brand name changed to Smak St. Petersburg. Economic crisis was the reason for creating its own brand; the new brand helped increase market share. The new plant, which opened in December 1998, at the site of a former Technoshock warehouse on Predportovaya street in St. Petersburg, originally produced only Daria. In addition, Tinkoff made products under the brands of Tolsty kok, Dobry product and Tsar-batyushka.

Daria first became popular due to an advertising campaign in which five billboards in St. Petersburg and two in Moscow showed an image of female buttocks covered with flour and the caption Your favorite pelmeni!. Another commercial included the phrase, From these raviolek you’ll get stomach cramps, which caused the Ravioli company dissatisfaction. In return they used a phrase Daria, shoo! in their advertisement campaign.

In 2001, Daria was sold to Roman Abramovich and Andrew Bloch's holding company Planeta Management for $21 million, of which $7 million were used to pay off debt.

=== Tinkoff Beer ===
In 1997 Tinkov could not find an investor for the construction of a brewery. Two meetings helped: an equipment supplier, with whom Tinkoff met at the Drinktec exhibition in Munich, proposed to combine the brewery with a restaurant and focus on the development of the brand; the other supplier suggested that their beer be called after Tinkov's family name according to the Bavarian tradition.

The initial investment amounted to one million Deutschmarks, and in August 1998 the first restaurant was opened in St. Petersburg on Kazanskaya street, 7. There soon appeared a line for beer in bottles. In 2001 a restaurant was opened in Moscow in Protochny lane, the investment in which amounted to $2 million. Other restaurants were opened in Samara in November 2002 and in Novosibirsk in January 2003; there were further openings in Nizhny Novgorod, Kazan, Ufa, Yekaterinburg, Vladivostok and Sochi.

The first plant was built by the summer of 2003 with the support of Zenit Bank, which opened a credit line for Tinkoff Brewery. For construction of the second plant the company raised the funds through a bond issue, as well as the loans from Zenit Bank and the German HypoVereinsbank. The second plant worth about $75 million was completely built on credit funds.

Tinkoff factories produced Tinkoff beer, Tekiza, and T. While expanding, the company invested significant funds in mass marketing. There was even a bad experience of collaboration with photographer and director Oliviero Toscani, author of the United Colors of Benetton advertising campaigns.

The Sun Interbrew group had shown interest in acquisition of the Tinkoff factories since, and in 2005 the transaction took place. It paid about $200 million for the factories and brand. After that Tinkov did a deal to sell and lease back the premises of the Tinkoff restaurants to the management company Troika Dialog for about $10–12 million. Finally in 2008–2009 the restaurants themselves were acquired by Mint Capital equity fund.

=== Tinkoff Bank ===
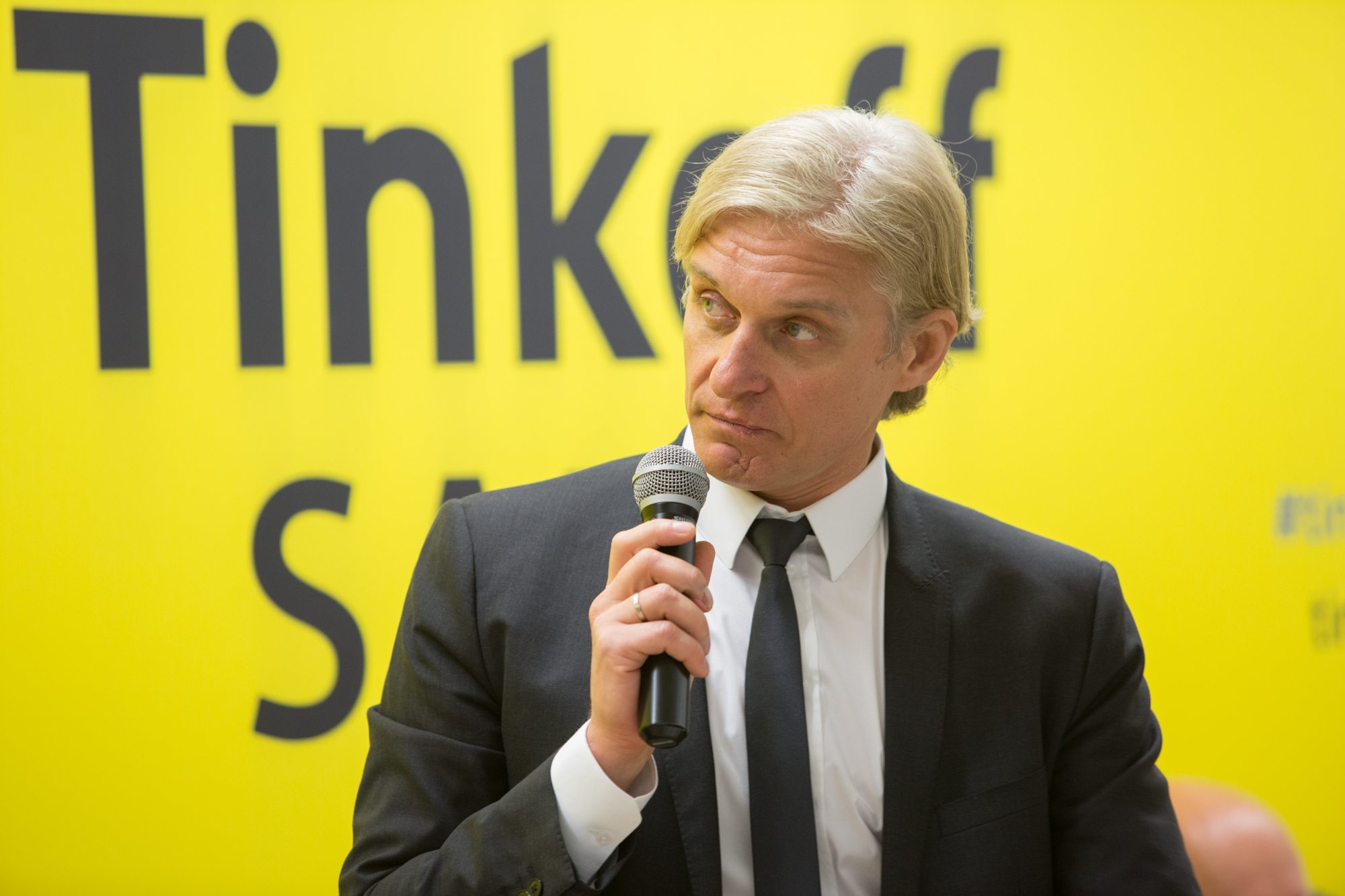
Oleg Tinkov at Tinkoff-Saxo event in Moscow, 2014

On November 18, 2005, on Necker Island, owned by billionaire Sir Richard Branson, Oleg Tinkov presented a draft or his proposal for a future bank. In 2006 he acquired the Moscow Himmashbank and based on it created an online bank, which was a first in Russia. Despite setbacks in attracting investment at the start of the project, during the crisis of 2008 the bank showed a 50-fold increase in profits.

Tinkoff Credit Systems reduced costs at the expense of marketing which was non-standard for the banking sector and the widespread use of computer processing of the data instead of human labor. For a long time the bank did not attract deposits and used its own capital for lending.

Tinkoff's technology platform played a major role in its growth. The IPO of the bank was listed as one of the largest deals in the 2013 Russian version of Forbes; Tinkov doubled his fortune and took position 1210 in the world ranking of billionaires. On 14 October 2013, TCS had its IPO and several days later Oleg Tinkov renounced his United States citizenship.

In the beginning of 2015 Tinkoff Credit Systems changed its name to Tinkoff Bank. The simpler and more concise name was intended to better reflect the full range of financial institution services.

As of February 2020 Tinkov owned 44% of the bank, and it remained his main project.

In December 2020, Tinkov sold 5.3% of TCS Group for $325 million, reducing his stake to 35%. He announced his intention to spend part of this money ($200 million) to create a fund for the study of leukemia.

In January 2021, his remaining shares were converted from class B to class A. As a result, the Tinkov family's voting rights in the group decreased from 84% to 35%.

In February 2022, sanctions imposed on Russia as a result of their 2022 invasion of Ukraine heavily impacted the ruble and Tinkoff's shares crashed. Tinkov lost the majority of his net worth, retaining under $1 billion.

=== Investments ===
A bne IntelliNews publication alleged that Tinkov was the investor of Plata, a Fintech startup launched by the former Tinkoff Bank employees. Plata became the first Latin American startup to reach over USD 1 billion valuation since 2022.

=== Tinkoff Restaurants ===
The Tinkoff Restaurants cycling team under command of coach Alexander Kuznetsov became historically the third Russian professional team. At the time of its appearance it was the only one in Russia. The team was launched in January 2006 at the headquarters at Kutzetnov's Spanish villa. It was composed of members of the Russian national Track cycling team, including Mikhail Ignatiev, Nikolay Trusov, Alexander Serov, Sergey Klimov, Pavel Brutt and Ivan Rovny. Airline Siberia was the joint team sponsorand the team's annual budget was $4 million.

In the 2006 season the team riders won first place in the team pursuit at the Track Cycling World Cup in Los Angeles, and Pavel Brutt won the Tour of Greece and the Cinturón a Mallorca.

The reason for the team disbanding was the conflict between Alexander Kuznetsov and Tinkov.

== Cycling ==
Tinkov is passionate about road cycling and has the title of candidate in master of sports of the USSR. In 2005, he created a professional cycling team Tinkoff Restaurants, which later changed its name to Tinkoff Credit Systems and became the basis for the Katyusha team. From December 2013 to November 2016 he owned the cycling team Tinkoff.

=== Tinkoff Credit Systems ===
Tinkoff Credit Systems was founded in the 2007 season on the basis of Tinkoff Restaurants, but with an Italian management and registration. UCI Professional Continental license allowed athletes to participate in all the major European races. The new line-up had a higher number of foreign athletes and the captain was an American Tyler Hamilton.

Successful performances of the team, including these at the stages of the Giro d'Italia in 2008, attracted the attention of former cyclist Igor Makarov, the owner of Itera corporation, who purchased the license to establish team Katyusha.

=== Tinkoff team ===
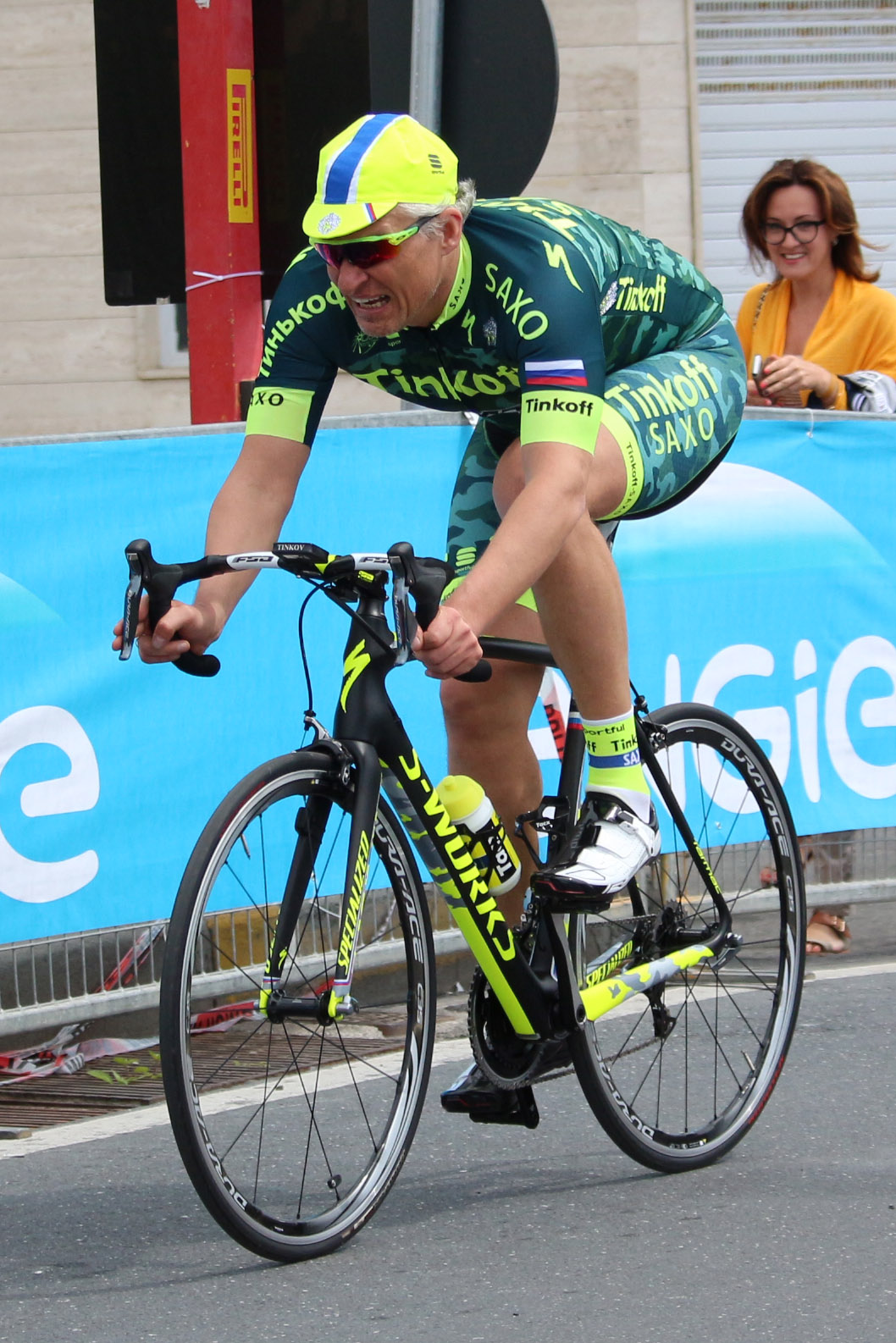
Oleg Tinkov, Giro d'Italia 2015

In December 2013 Tinkov, through the management company Tinkoff Sport A/C bought a team from the former cyclist Bjarne Riis. Tinkoff Credit Systems sponsored this team from 2012 on.

Tinkoff and Katusha were the only Russian teams performing at the UCI World Tour races.

Tinkov takes part in training alongside the team's athletes and travels to competitions. In honor of Contador's victory in the 2015 Giro d'Italia he painted his hair pink.

Tinkov has repeatedly criticized the bureaucratization of professional cycling and its "outdated" sponsorship model. He became one of the shareholders of the project Velon – World Tour Team initiative for the development of professional cycling, organizing more spectacular events, protecting the interests of sponsors and team owners. Tinkoff also stands for Grand Tour schedule, which will enable the strongest riders to perform at each of them during the season. In 2014, he offered the captain Tinkoff-Saxo Alberto Contador and his rivals Chris Froome, who rode for Sky Procycling and Vincenzo Nibali of the Astana Pro Team 1 million euros each for performing in all three of the world's major stage races.

Since 2016 the cycling team races under the name Tinkoff, as Saxo Bank decided not to renew sponsorship past 2015. At the end of 2015 Tinov announced that by the end of the 2016 season he would leave cycling and sell the team. As the sole title sponsor of the team, Tinkov was spending about 20 million euros on it per year, and during his sponsorship invested about 50 million euros in it together with the bank. In addition to the increased financial burden, among the reasons he mentioned were the lack of potential for bank-branding, losses for the cycling teams, the absence of reforms in the sport, as well as the long-running conflict between the Union Cycliste Internationale and Amaury Sport Organisation. In its last season the team finished in second place and was finally disbanded in November 2016.

== Other ==
Among Tinkov's property is a personal aircraft Dassault Falcon 7X with the bank's logo on the tail. In September 2015 Tinkov announced that he would invest 250 million rubles in the construction of a hotel and recreational complex in the Elizovo district on Kamchatka, where he often stayed. It was assumed that the launch would happen in the fourth quarter of the following year. In January 2016 it became known that he had abandoned the project because of opposition from local officials and instead invested in the French Alps. In June of the same year he opened two Tinkoff luxurious chalets called La Datcha: one in the ski resort of Courchevel and the second – in Val Thorens. In 2017 and 2018 there were to be new homes in Forte dei Marmi and Astrakhan. On 3 July 2020 in Vlissingen (Netherlands) the world's first private icebreaker yacht was launched by Tinkov. The 77 m vessel (also called La Datcha) cost €100 million. It features an icebreaker-class hull, is polar code compliant and offers accommodation for 12 guests. The yacht was available for weekly charters for most of the year.

In 2017, Tinkov renounced his American citizenship. Tinkov is one of many Russian oligarchs named in the Countering America's Adversaries Through Sanctions Act, CAATSA, signed into law by President Donald Trump in 2017.

=== Publications ===
From 2007 to 2010, Tinkov was a columnist for Finance magazine. Since 2010, the chief editor of the magazine Oleg Anisimov went on to work at Tinkoff Bank and worked with him on the TV show Business secrets with Oleg Tinkoff at the online channel Russia.ru. An interview with Mikhail Fridman in October 2015 restarted production of Business secrets after a two-year break.

Tinkov has Facebook and Twitter accounts. His manner of communication is considered provocative and often leads to disputes and mutual insults.

Tinkov wrote two books summarizing his entrepreneurial experience: "I am like everyone" (Russian: «Я такой как все») which was published in 2010 and "How to become a businessman" (Russian: «Как стать бизнесменом»), published a year later.

=== Tinkoff lane ===
In order to promote the brand Tinkoff a story of Porphyry Tinkoff, an ancestor and a brewer, who supplied beer to the imperial court since 1759, was invented. According to legend, the page mentioning him, was found by Oleg Tinkov in Brockhaus and Efron Encyclopedic Dictionary. The fake page was presented in the Toponymy Commission of St. Petersburg with a proposal to memorialize the Tinkoff family line in the street name. Officials did not notice the fraud and agreed to the company's proposal; on 7 July 2003 Tinkoff Lane appeared in Pushkin, Saint Petersburg.

=== Conflict with bloggers ===
On August 8, 2017, the YouTube channel NEMAGIA published a review dedicated to Tinkov and Tinkoff Bank. The video caused a significant resonance in the web. Shortly after its release, on August 28, 2017, Oleg Tinkov filed a lawsuit with the Kemerovo District Court for the protection of honor, dignity and business reputation. By a court decision on September 4, Roskomnadzor ordered bloggers to remove the video criticizing Tinkov's activities. On September 12, searches were conducted at the co-author of Nemagia, Alexei Pskovitin, and his computer equipment was confiscated. Police strength's workers specially flew to Kemerovo from Moscow. Many Russian bloggers came out in support of NEMAGIA. On September 26, Tinkov withdrew claims against video bloggers from "Nemagia". The criminal case against NEMAGIA was dropped.

=== Deripaska's lawsuit ===
In May 2022, Russian businessman Oleg Deripaska filed a lawsuit against Tinkov. The reason was a comment on Instagram, where Tinkov called Deripaska "an oligarch and a thief." The co-respondent is the owner of Instagram - the Meta company. The amount of the claim is 2 billion rubles. Hearings began on August 16 in the district court of Ust-Labinsk in the Krasnodar Krai. Later, the claim was transferred to the Arbitration Court of the Moscow Region.

=== US tax evasion case ===
On February 27, 2020, Tinkoff Credit Systems Group Holding PLC (TCSGH) announced that Tinkov was attending court hearings initiated in London by the US Internal Revenue Service. No details were disclosed. Two days later, on March 1, 2020, The Daily Express published an article claiming that Tinkov paid £20m bail to avoid being held in jail until an extradition hearing was due to take place in April. The article also stated the terms of his release required him to surrender his passports and be confined to his residence for 12 hours per day. The following day, on March 2, 2020, TCSGH released a statement confirming the details of The Daily Express article. An indictment issued on September 26, 2019, by a federal grand jury was unsealed on March 5 following Tinkov's arrest in London. The indictment alleged that Tinkov concealed $1 billion in assets and income when renouncing his U.S. citizenship. The indictment charged Tinkov with two counts of tax fraud, each carrying a potential 3-year prison term. In October 2021, Oleg Tinkov settled tax claims on the premise of paying at least 506.8 million dollars, including 248.5 million dollars of unpaid taxes, without going to jail, according to US Department of Justice.

=== Health ===
On March 6, 2020, the day after the indictment was unsealed, Tinkov announced he was fighting acute leukemia that had been diagnosed in October 2019. It was reported that Tinkov had already undergone chemotherapy, and that his silence was associated with his declining health. After an announcement by his representatives, the shares of TCS Group, which included Tinkov on its board of directors, fell almost 25% on the Moscow Exchange.

On December 18, 2020, Tinkov reported that his last analysis after a bone marrow transplant showed complete remission from cancer "at the molecular level". Oleg Tinkov visited the donor who saved his life, he could not hold back tears and even knelt in front of the woman.

=== Cancer Fund ===
In December 2020 Tinkov announced that he and his family are planning to establish a charity fund to help leukemia sufferers. The Tinkov Family Foundation (TFF) was registered in 2021. Its tasks were to promote donorship, create a national register for bone marrow stem cells, build transplantation centers in remote regions of Russia and offer training programs to haematologists. Oleg Tinkov invested more than $200 mln of his own money to the Fund. On August 19 TFF announced a new strategic partnership with Leukemia Foundation. It offered financial support for research, operations, and purchase of medicine. In October 2021 it also announced giving 400 mln roubles for a project that in 3 years should treat more than 900 patients with leukemia. After being declared a “foreign agent ” in Russia, Tinkov announced that he was closing the charitable Tinkov Family Foundation and leaving the board of trustees of the Leukemia Foundation, so as not to complicate his work.

== Sanctions and crackdown ==
Tinkov has been critical of Vladimir Putin, in particular with regard to the 2022 Russian invasion of Ukraine. Tinkov wrote on his Instagram page, on 19 April 2022, in Russian: "The generals, waking up with a hangover, realized that they had a shit army", "I don't see a single beneficiary of this crazy war! Innocent people and soldiers are dying", "Of course there are morons who draw Z, but 10% of any country are morons. 90% of Russians are AGAINST this war!" and "Kremlin officials are shocked that neither they or their children will be off to the Mediterranean in the summer. Businessmen are trying to save the rest of their property." Finally, he wrote in English: "Dear 'collective West' please give Mr. Putin a clear exit to save his face and stop this massacre. Please be more rational and humanitarian."

On the next day after the first post with critics of the war in Ukraine Tinkov said his executives were contacted by the presidential administration with a demand to sell his 35% stake, otherwise the bank would be nationalized. Tinkov says he was offered a price of about 3% from the real value of his share.

On 3 May 2022, Tinkov wrote: "I'm taking the Tinkoff and La Datcha brands out of the country. They belong to my family: I don't want to besmirch them with the blood of Russian soldiers and the citizens of Ukraine. Ukraine will win because good always wins over evil— we were taught that at school." Because of these statements, one of the public organizations turned to the Russian Prosecutor General's Office with a request to recognize Tinkov as a "Foreign agent" (after emigration and renunciation of citizenship, this is a rather symbolic action). In February 2024, the Ministry of Justice of the Russian Federation added Tinkov to the register of foreign agents.

On 1 November 2022, he renounced his Russian citizenship. Tinkov had instructed lawyers to begin the process of removing his name from Tinkoff bank.

=== UK sanctions ===
In March 2022, the UK government-imposed sanctions against Tinkov. As stated in the document, Tinkov was accused of "receiving benefits from the Russian government or its support" because he owned and controlled financial sector enterprises of "strategic importance" to the state. Tinkov's yachts, ships and planes were denied access to British ports and airports, though he was not banned from entering the country.

Forbes and Forbes Russia do not consider Oleg Tinkov to be an oligarch, despite him having been sanctioned: "Tinkov is not an oligarch because he built an independent fortune without ties to the Russian government under either Boris Yeltsin or Vladimir Putin".

Sanctions were lifted on July 20, 2023.

== Publications ==
- Tinkov, Oleg (2010). Я такой как все [I am like everyone] (in Russian). Eksmo. p. 260. ISBN 978-5-9902155-1-1.
- Tinkov, Oleg (2011). Как стать бизнесменом [How to become a businessman] (in Russian). Eksmo, Alpina Publisher. p. 256. ISBN 978-5-699-51390-1.
