= Sese coal mine =

Coal mine in Central, Botswana

Sese Coal Mine
- Location: Central District, Botswana
- Products: Coking coal

The Sese Coal Mine is a coal mine located in Central District, Botswana. The mine has coal reserves amounting to 2.73 billion tonnes of coking coal, one of the largest coal reserves in Africa and the world.

== See also ==
- List of mines in Botswana
