= Federal Service for Supervision of Natural Resources =

Russian executive body

- Федеральная служба по надзору в сфере природопользования (Росприроднадзор)
- Digital emblem of the Federal Service for Supervision of Natural Resources

- Emblem of the Federal Service for Supervision of Natural Resources

Agency overview
- Formed: 2004; 22 years ago
- Headquarters: Bolshaya Gruzinskaya ulitsa, 4/6, Moscow, Russia
- Agency executive: Svetlana Radionova
- Parent agency: Ministry of Natural Resources and Environment
- Website: Rpn.gov.ru

The Federal Service for Supervision of Natural Resources (Rosprirodnadzor; Russian: Федеральная служба по надзору в сфере природопользования (Росприроднадзор), tr. Federal'naya sluzhba po nadzoru v sfere prirodopolzovaniya) is the Federal Environmental, Industrial and Nuclear Supervision Service of Russia. This regulator is part of the Ministry of Natural Resources of the Russian Federation.

== History ==
In August 2019, the Minister of Natural Resources of the Russian Federation decreed that Rosprirodnadzor would be shrunk from 89 regional entities into 32 super-regional entities.

In September 2019, Rosprirodnadzor and Norilsk Nickel signed an agreement whereby the latter would "automatically meter and monitor pollutant emissions" from "its mining facilities".

On 4 June 2020, Rosprirodnadzor declared a state of emergency when 20,000 tonnes of diesel oil had spilled since 29 May from a plant owned by power subsidiary NTEK of Norilsk Nickel. The Investigative Committee of Russia opened a criminal case "over the pollution and alleged negligence", and the plant supervisor was taken into custody.

In July 2020, Rosprirodnadzor sought compensation of $2 billion for the diesel spill. Minister of Natural Resources Dmitry Kobylkin reminded everyone that the polluter-pay principle strengthens his jurisdiction.

== Leadership ==
- Oleg Mitvol (2004-2009)
- Svetlana Radionova (born 5 January 1977, Alma-Ata, Kazakh SSR, USSR) (2019) (Note: Known as the "bulldog" (Russian: "бульдог"), Svetlana Gennadievna Radionova (Russian: Светлана Геннадьевна Радионова; born 5 January 1977, Alma-Ata, Kazakh SSR, USSR) is both a close personal friend and business associate of Anton Ustinov who has been the chairman of the board of Sogaz since 2016. As a both a prosecutor and an investigator, Radionova strongly supported Igor Sechin's interests in Yukos.)
