= Selkirk mine =

Mine in Botswana

- Location within Botswana
- Location: North-East District, Botswana; 21.3629°S 27.7039°E
- Products: Nickel; Copper; Cobalt; Platinum group
- Company: Premium Nickel Resources Corporation
- Acquired: 2022

The Selkirk mine is a large mine in the west of Botswana in the North-East District. Selkirk represents one of the largest nickel reserve in Botswana having estimated reserves of 135 million tonnes of ore grading 0.25% nickel. The 135 million tonnes of ore contains 0.3 million tonnes of nickel metal.

Operated for some years by the Tati Nickel Mining Company (TNMC), mine operations were sold to the Canada-based Premium Nickel Resources Corporation (PNR) in 2022.

== See also ==
- Phoenix nickel mine
