= Orogenic gold deposit =

Type of hydrothermal mineral deposit

An orogenic gold deposit is a type of hydrothermal mineral deposit. More than 75% of the gold recovered by humans through history belongs to the class of orogenic gold deposits. Rock structure is the primary control of orogenic gold mineralization at all scales, as it controls both the transport and deposition processes of the mineralized fluids, creating structural pathways of high permeability and focusing deposition to structurally controlled locations.

== Overview ==
Orogenic gold deposits are hosted by shear zones in orogenic belts, specifically in metamorphosed fore-arc and back-arc regions and were formed during syn- to late metamorphic stages of orogeny. Formation of orogenic gold deposits is related to structural evolution and structural geometry of lithospheric crust, as hydrothermal fluids migrate through pre-existing and active discontinuities (faults, shear zones, lithological boundaries) generated by tectonic processes. These discontinuities provide pathways and channel fluid flow, not only of ore-bearing fluids, but also of fluids transporting metallic elements such as silver, arsenic, mercury and antimony and gases, as well as melts. Gold-bearing fluids precipitate at an upper-crustal level between 3 and 15 km depth (possibly up to 20 km depth), forming vertically extensive quartz veins, typically below the transition of greenschist-to-amphibolite metamorphic facies.

=== Historical term ===
Waldemar Lindgren made the first widely accepted classification of gold deposits and introduced the term "mesothermal" for mostly gold-only deposits in metamorphic terranes and greenstone belts. The term mesothermal refers to temperatures between 175 and 300 °C and a formation depth of 1.2–3.6 km. In 1993, the term orogenic gold deposits was introduced, as gold deposits of this type have a similar origin and gold mineralization is structurally controlled.

=== Temporal pattern ===
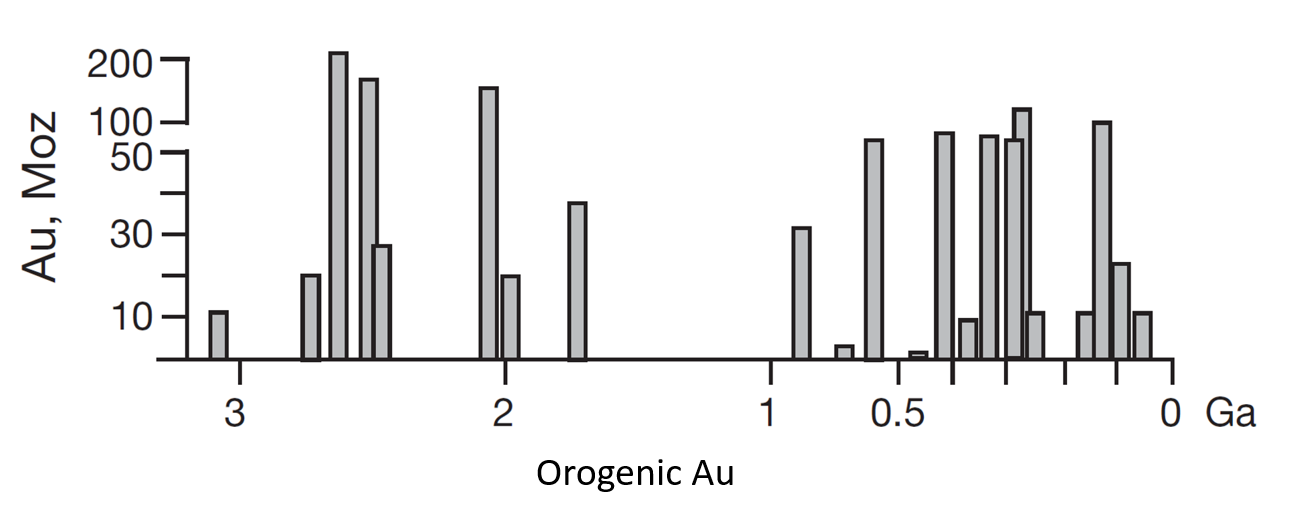
Temporal distribution of gold in orogenic gold deposits

Amalgamation of disrupted continental masses to form new supercontinents, known as Wilson Cycles, play a key role in the formation of deposits, by initiating major regional change of the geochemical, mineralogical and structural nature of the lithosphere. Orogenic gold deposits were only formed in certain time slices of the Earth's history. Orogenic gold deposits are mainly concentrated in three epochs of Earth history: (1) Neoarchean 2.8–2.5 Ga, (2) Paleoproterozoic 2.1–1.8 Ga and (3) Phanerozoic 0.500–0.05 Ga. With an absence in the period 1.80–0.8 Ga, referred to as a period of general minimum ore-forming activity. The same temporal occurrence is documented for conglomerate-hosted deposits. The time-bound nature of many mineral deposits reflects the break-up or formation of supercontinents, which most likely also applies for orogenic gold deposits.

== Fluid source ==
In magmatic systems, ores and host rocks are derived from the same fluid. In the case of hydrothermal fluids, host rocks are older than the predominantly aqueous fluids that carry and deposit metals and thus complicate defining a host rock associated with gold fluid formation. A number of rock types have been suggested as the source of orogenic gold, but due to the variability of host rocks in Earth's history and deposit-scale, their relation to Earth-scale gold formation processes is unclear. Furthermore, age dating of the deposits and their host rocks shows that there are large time gaps in their formation. Age dating indicates that mineralization took place 10 to 100 Ma after the formation of the host rocks. These temporal gaps suggest an overall genetic independence of the fluid formation and that of local lithologies.

== Mineralogy and geochemistry ==
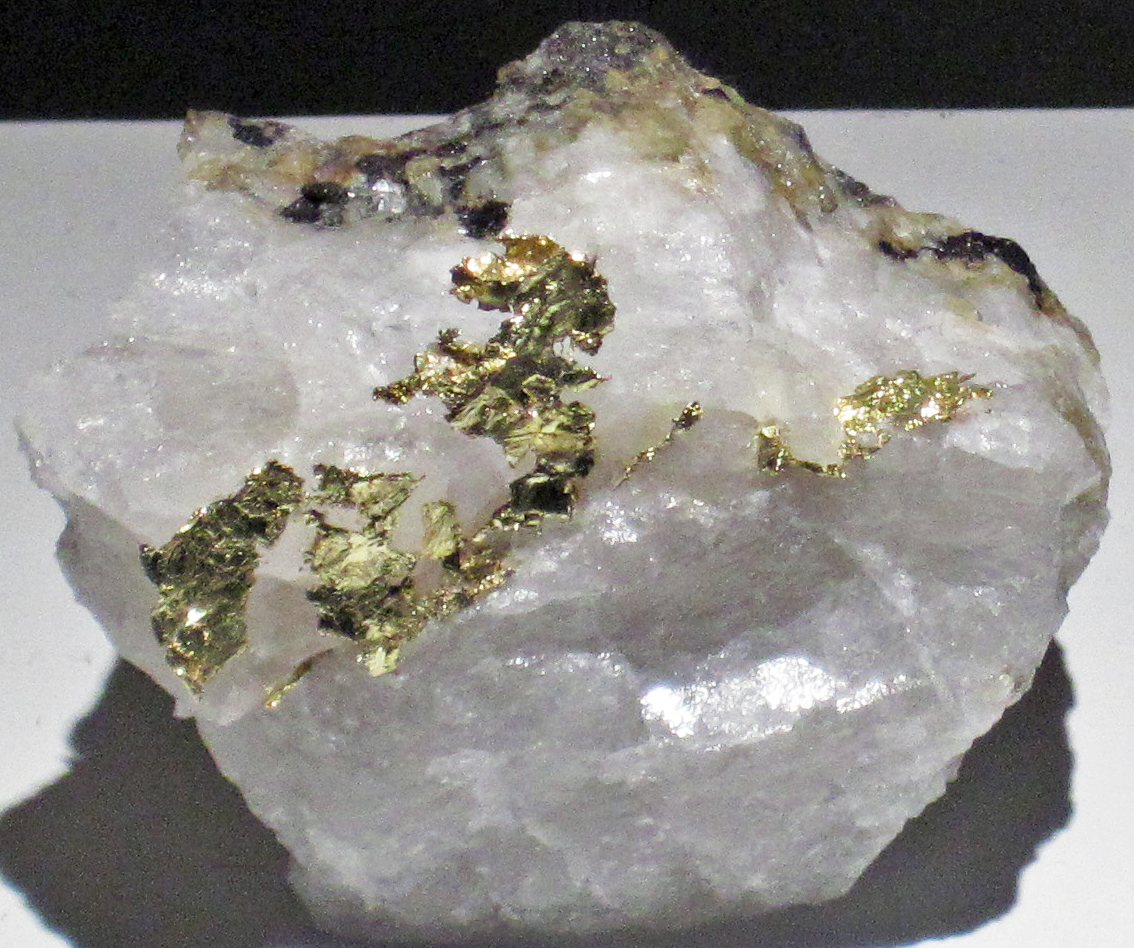
Hydrothermal gold in quartz (white mineral) vein with other gangue minerals (black minerals)

Geochemical studies on gold bearing quartz-carbonate veins are important to determine temperature, pressure, at which the veins were generated, and the chemical signature of fluids. Quartz is generally the dominant mineral in the veins, but there are also gold bearing carbonate dominant veins in orogenic deposits. Ore bodies of orogenic gold deposits are generally defined by ≤ 3–5% sulfide minerals, most commonly arsenopyrite in metasedimentary host rocks and pyrite/pyrrhotite in meta-igneous rocks, and ≤ 5–15% carbonate minerals, such as ankerite, dolomite and calcite. A common characteristic of almost all orogenic gold lodes is the presence of widespread carbonate alteration zones, notably ankerite, ferroan dolomite, siderite and calcite. The tendency of gold to be preferentially transported as a sulfide complex also explain the near absence of base metals (Cu, Pb, Zn) in the same mineral systems, because these metals form complexes with chlor rather than sulfur.

In general, hydrothermal fluids are characterized by low salinities (up to 12 wt% NaCl equivalent), high H_{2}O and CO_{2} contents (> 4 mol%), with lesser amounts of CH_{4} and N_{2} and near-neutral pH. High salinity fluids can result from dehydration of evaporite sequences, containing high Na and Cl concentrations and above mentioned base metal complexes. Although some authors suggest a specific range of CO_{2} of about 5–20%, there is a wide variety from almost pure CO_{2} to almost pure H_{2}O. Whereby CO_{2}-rich fluids may indicate high fluid production temperatures > 500 °C.

== Genetic models ==
Orogenic gold deposits formed in metamorphosed terranes of all ages that have little in common except for being sites of complexity and low mean stress. For this reason, a discussion of the gold deposit formation in a universal genetic model is most difficult and several models have been considered. The fundamental control of the chemical signature of orogenic gold fluids can most likely be found in the processes that take place in the source region. Therefore, the discussion about genetic models of orogenic gold deposits concentrates on the possible source of gold-bearing fluids.

=== Magmatic–hydrothermal fluid source ===
A magmatic–hydrothermal source from which felsic-intermediate magmas release fluids as they crystallize. Fluids that exsolved from a granitic melt intrude into the upper or middle crust and are enriched in many elements, such as S, Cu, Mo, Sb, Bi, W, Pb, Zn, Te, Hg, As and Ag. But a main constraint is, that in many gold provinces, gold mineralization and granitic intrusion, which indicate magmatic activity, show no age relationship. In addition, the composition of granites are extremely variable and show no consistent temporal pattern through geological time. Even if some deposits clearly indicate a magmatic source, it must be considered that only due to overprinting mineralization with higher gold grades from other sources, these deposits became economic. A hybrid deposit with a combination of a magmatic and a metamorphic (mid- or sub-crustal) source is a much more common scenario.

=== Mid-crustal fluid source ===
A model that fits most of the gold provinces and provides some of the major gold resources, entails a metamorphic fluid source. In this style of gold deposit, gold and other elements have been released into metamorphic fluids, from material accreted to a craton during subduction-related scenarios. Most likely, fluids have been produced under prograde greenschist-to-amphibolite-facies metamorphism (220–450 °C and 1–5 Kbar). The generally low salinity of the hydrothermal fluids can be attributed to devolatilization of minerals associated with metamorphic phase reactions, involving dehydration and decarbonisation. Composition of produced fluids vary, depending on the P–T conditions and rock chemistry and may be influenced by fluid rock–rock interactions along the pathway. Coupling between fluid flow and structural deformation plays a key role for mineralization. Gold formation occurs typically in the late phase of an orogeny, during changes in far-field stresses. Created and reactivated faults serve as pathways for hydrothermal solutions. These gold- and silica fluids migrated through fractures over long distances and were precipitated in deformation structures at the brittle–ductile transition and near the base of the seismogenic zone. Gold deposits in this model are characterized by elevated S and As and only minor enrichment of other elements.

=== Sub-crustal fluid source ===
The model of a sub-crustal source is similar to the middle-crustal model. In both cases fluids and metals formed from volcanic and sedimentary products in tectonic processes, but also show differences in the origin of the source and the processes involved. This model is associated with fluid ascent from devolatilization of a subducting slab and overlying sediment wedge. Oceanic mantle, crust and overlying sediments were subducted, and rapidly heated, and H-O-C-rich vapours released fluids during heating, at temperatures below 650 °C and depths of 100 km.

Serpentinization (slab mantle hydration) may play an important role for two reasons. First, recent fluid-flow experiments confirm that serpentinite acts as a lubricant for the overlying subcontinental lithospheric mantle (SCLM) and, therefore, plays a major role in dynamic settings. Secondly, serpentinization involves volume increase as large as 40% that enhances fracturing in peridotites and provides permeability for hydrothermal fluids. Serpentinite formed by hydrated oceanic mantle carries up to 13 wt. % water to the deep mantle. Slab dewatering may start at depths less than 100 km and over-pressured fluids migrate into fault zones in the upper lithosphere and eventually form gold deposits. However, fluid migration along faults might not be effective in a compressional stress field, thereby increasing the possibility that neutralstress planes control a vertical fluid supply in the fault zones. Under this assumption, the trigger to cause fluid release might be the end of subduction or a stalling of the slab during subduction, resulting in a delayed fluid migration and gold mineralization process. The sub-crustal fluid source model is more robust as it describes both a source and a mechanism, but also has limitations, as many Precambrian gold deposits do not have thick sedimentary successions.

== Tectonics and gold formation ==
Although efforts have been made to define a specific deformation structure associated with the formation of orogenic gold deposits, no specific structure could be identified. Rather, there are various types of faults hosting gold deposits. Nevertheless, orogenic gold deposits have a number of repetitive structural geometries that control ore-fluid formation, transport and precipitation.

=== Geodynamic setting and architecture ===
Large-scale lithospheric deformation structures correlate with gold endowment, and active structural permeability in the crust is controlled by the prevailing tectonic stress field. There is an increasing body of evidence that the formation of orogenic gold deposits is tied to specific geodynamic settings, primary orogenic belts.

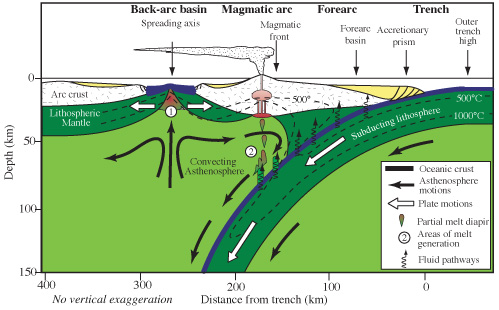
Schematic cross section of a typical orogenic accretionary terrane formed due to a subducting plate. Permeable pathways form for hydrothermal fluids to penetrate and precipitate gold bearing quartz-carbonate veins in forearc, arc and back-arc regions.

A variety of gold deposits are formed in accretionary orogens, including orogenic gold deposits. Orogenic gold deposits are typically located in metamorphosed fore-arc and back-arc regions, as well as in the arc and show a close spatial relationship to lamprophyres and associated felsic porphyry dikes and sills. Lamprophyre dykes are not the source of the ore fluid itself but indicate a deep lithospheric connection for fluid conduits.

Orogenic gold deposits show a spatial relationship to structural discontinuities, including faults, fractures, dilatation zones and shear zones. The ore- hosting structures are subsidiary faults or shear zones (mostly D3–D4 in a D1 to D4 structural sequence), which are always related to a major regional-scale deformation structures, such as lithospheric boundaries and suture zones. The deformation structures hosting the gold deposits are typically discordant with respect to the stratigraphic layering of the host rocks. The mineralised structures indicate syn- to post-mineralisation displacements, such as slickensides formed under hydrothermal conditions. The geometry of vein systems is primarily influenced by a combination of dynamic stress changes and fluid pressure variations.

== Timeline of global mineralization ==
Improved geochronological data on gold and paleo-reconstructions have given a better understanding of the mineralization of orogenic gold deposits over time. The oldest known orogenic gold deposits (>3 Ga) are in the Kaapvaal craton in the Barberton greenstone belt, the Ukrainian Shield and the Pilbara craton. The Witwatersrand placer gold deposit in South Africa is estimated to have been mineralized by orogenic processes at a similar time. The next period of time for favorable orogenic gold deposit formation was 2.8–2.55 Ga in the greenstone belts of the Yilgarn craton, Superior province, Dharwar craton, Zimbabwe craton, Wyoming craton and Baltic shield.

Proceeding the Archean, the next episode of orogenic gold deposit formation was from 2.1 to 1.8 Ga following the breakup of an Archean supercontinent and subsequent orogenic processes which ensued. In this time period, deposits formed in interior Australia, northwestern Africa, northern South America, Sveconfennia and the Canadian shield. This is followed by a period of insignificant orogenic gold formation from 1.6 Ga to 0.8 Ga which is argued to either be due to worldwide major extension associated with anorogenic magmatism, or due to erosion of narrow continental margins in which the orogenic gold was mineralized.

The formation of Gondwana in the Neoproterozoic by the process of collisions of cratons indicates the time which orogenic gold-vein formation became continuous and wide spread until present day. From the formation of Gondwana until the beginning of the paleozoic, deposits formed in the Arabian-Nubian shield, western Africa, Brazil's Atlantic shield, in the Sao Francisco craton, and northwestern Australia. From the paleozoic until the beginning of the mesozoic, in conjunction with the various orogenies which contributed to the evolution of Pangea, orogenic gold deposits were mineralized in Australia, Westland in New Zealand, Victoria Land in Antarctica, southern South America, southern Europe, central Asia and northwest China.

The break-up of Pangea in the Mesozoic marks the final formation of major, globally-distributed orogenic gold deposits. This event created an immense range of subduction zones surrounding the Pacific ocean. To the east of the Pacific, the Cordilleran orogen resulted in many Middle Jurassic to mid-Cretaceous orogenic gold deposits. To the west of the Pacific, a similar contemporaneous orogenic event occurred, resulting in orogenic gold deposits mineralizing in the Russian Far East and the North China craton during the Early Cretaceous.

== Economics ==
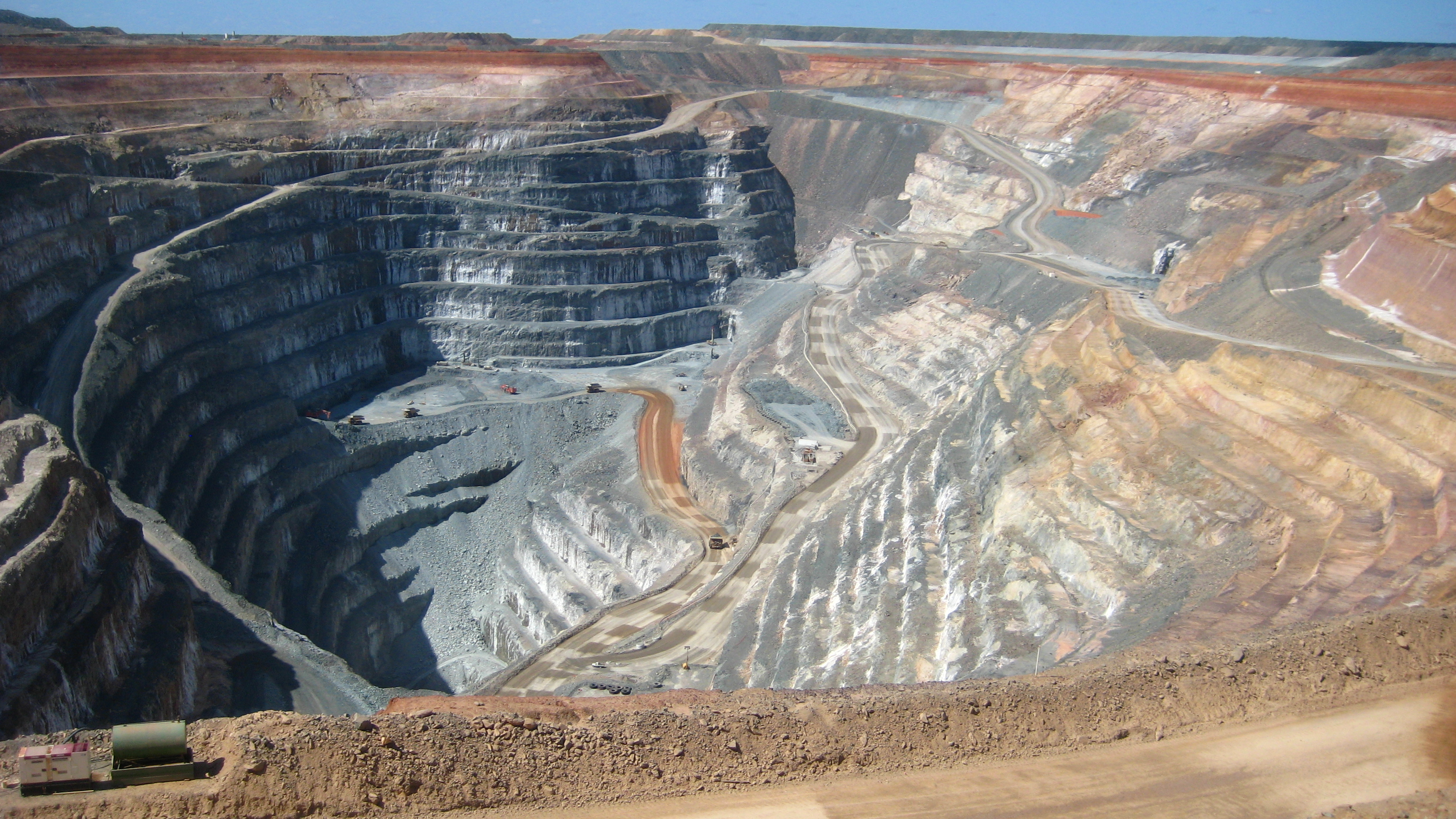
Sunrise Dam open-pit gold mine built on an orogenic gold deposit in Western Australia

Orogenic gold deposits are responsible for approximately 75% of the world's gold production at over 1 billion ounces, when accounting that the origin of many gold placer deposits were orogenic in nature. The price of gold at a given time will have an impact on whether a deposit will be economically feasible. The economic viability of a deposit will also depend on the grade and tonnage of the reserves of a deposit, along with the costs associated with extracting the ore. Methods of delineating reserves and of extracting gold ore are improving over time, increasing the possibility for production of more gold. On the other hand, the environmental impact of extracting gold from orogenic gold deposits, such as cyanidation, is coming more under consideration over time. The cost of remediation for the environmental hazards of operating a mine at an orogenic gold deposit will impact its economic feasibility.

The typical grade of unmineralized igneous, sedimentary and metamorphic rocks is on average between 0.5 and 5 parts per billion. Generally, ores of 5 parts per million (g/t) or greater grade will be extracted using underground mining and aim follow the gold bearing structure. A gold mine can expect to extract ores of 1–2 parts per million (g/t) in an open-pit mine due to the relatively lower operating costs of an open-pit mine. These values will differ based on the fluctuating price of gold and the variable cost and capacity of, mining, milling and refining.

== Environmental effects ==
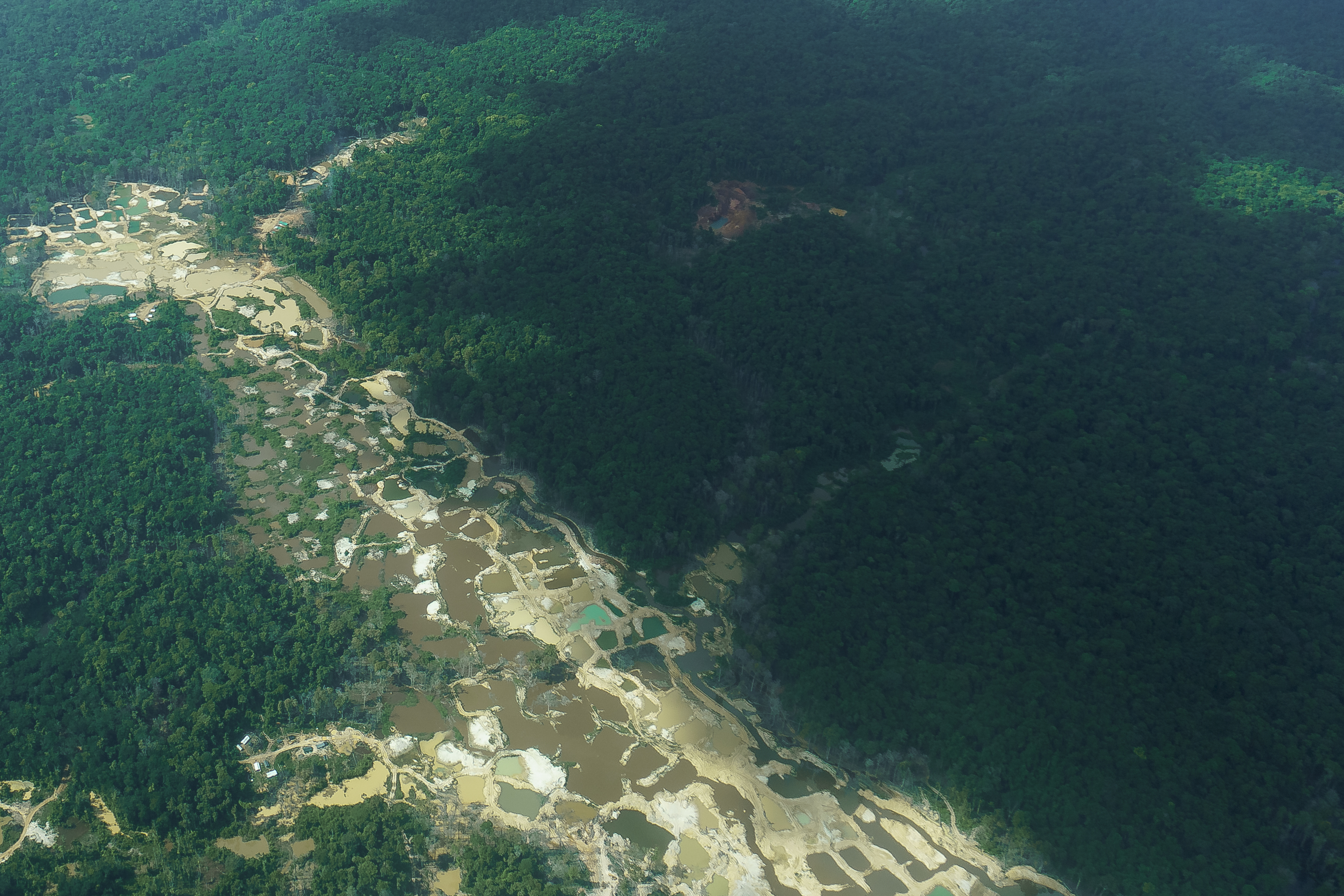
Gold mine tailings pond in Guyana vulnerable to dam failure, and draining cyanide into surrounding environment

The mining at orogenic gold deposits has significant negative environmental effects. Over 90% of ore extracted from orogenic gold deposits is treated by the process of cyanidation. The toxic waste created from this process is stored in tailings ponds, which presents a risk for contamination of soil and water in the event of accidents or negligence by those handling the toxic liquids. This contamination can occur in many forms such as dam failures, unregulated drainage into rivers, or leeching of toxic liquids through permeable soils. One such example of this type of environmental disaster is the August 19, 1995 Omai cyanide spill in which the tailings dam of the Canadian-owned Omai Gold Mines Ltd failed, releasing over 440,000 cubic meters of cyanide-laced effluent into the Omai river, causing over 80 km of disaster zone downriver. The energy consumption associated with operating a mine in an orogenic gold deposit also produces a large carbon footprint, which as a greenhouse gas contributes to climate change. Furthermore, creating space for open-pit mines, tailings ponds and mine infrastructure requires clearing vast amount of land, leading to deforestation and the destruction of natural habitats.

== Examples ==
- Bendigo, Australia
- Kalgoorlie
- Fazenda, Brazil
- Timmins, Canada
- Lamaque, Canada
- Val d'Or camp, Canada
- Seabee, Canada
- Salsigne, France
- The Oubasi orogenic gold deposit in Southern Ghana is host to mineral resources of over 70 Moz Au at a grade of 7.39g/t or higher, with a past production of 32 Moz Au. The deposit is located in the Birimian orogen, where gold mining is known to have taken place back to the 17th century, but modern industrial-scale mining began in 1897 by the Ashanti Goldfields Company.
- Poura, Burkina Faso
- Vasil'kovsk, Kazakhstan
- Berezovsk, Russia
- The Olimpiada orogenic gold deposit is located in the Yenisei Ridge, on the western side of Siberia, Russia. It contains more than 50 Moz Au at an average grade of 4–4.6 g/t. Exploration of orogenic gold began after the year 1840 when the source of nearby placer gold deposits was being investigated, after which large-scale mining operations began in the 1990s.
- The Mother Lode Homestake is located in South Dakota, USA, and is a historic mine which was host to orogenic gold held within a banded iron formation (BIF). This deposit produced more than 40 Moz Au from 1876 to 2001. Although the deposit is BIF-hosted, the style of mineralization is described as hydrothermal, in which the BIF formed a favorable chemical trap for gold.
