= Polyus (company) =

Russian gold mining company

PJSC Polyus
- Type: Public
- Traded as: MCX: PLZL; LSE: PLZL
- Industry: Gold mining
- Headquarters: Moscow, Russia
- Key people: Alexey Vostokov.
- Products: Gold
- Revenue: $8.72 billion (2025)
- Operating income: $5.13 billion (2025)
- Net income: $3.79 billion (2025)
- Total assets: $16 billion (2025)
- Total equity: $3.47 billion (2025)
- Owner: private (80.00%)
- Website: www.polyus.com

PJSC Polyus (Russian: ПАО "Полюс") is a Russian gold mining company. It is the largest gold producer in Russia and one of the top 10 gold mining companies globally by output (2.84 million ounces of gold production in 2019). It is headquartered in Moscow and is listed on both the Moscow and London Stock Exchanges. Polyus' main assets are located in Eastern Siberia and the Russian Far East - in the regions of Krasnoyarsk Krai, Irkutsk Oblast, Magadan Oblast, and the Republic of Sakha.

The company is controlled by Said Kerimov, son of Russian billionaire and politician, Suleyman Kerimov.

== History ==
Polyus was founded as Polyus Gold (Russian: Полюс Золото) in March 2006, as a result of a spin-off from the gold assets of Norilsk Nickel.

In May 2006, shares of Polyus Gold were admitted to listing and trading on the Russian stock exchanges RTS and MICEX (both of these later merged to form the Moscow Exchange). In December 2006, ADRs of Polyus Gold were listed and admitted to trading on the London Stock Exchange. Due to the sanctions imposed against it, the company plans to delist its depository lists from the LSE on 25 July 2023. Sanctions against Polyus were simultaneously imposed on 19 May 2023 by the United States, Great Britain, and Australia.

In 2009, the businessman Suleyman Kerimov bought a 37% stake in Polyus Gold from Vladimir Potanin. In 2015, the family of Suleyman Kerimov acquired 59% of Polyus Gold International Ltd (the parent holding company of Polyus Gold) and became the controlling shareholder of Polyus Gold. On 3 December 2015, Polyus Gold International Limited announced the delisting of its shares from the London Stock Exchange.

In 2016, Polyus Gold changed its name to Polyus.

In June 2017, Polyus's shares were re-admitted to trading on the London Stock Exchange.

In April 2019, Polyus sold a 3.84% stake worth US$390 million in a secondary public offering on the Moscow Stock Exchange.

== Operations ==
Polyus holds the world's third-largest gold reserves, with 64.4 million ounces of proven and probable gold reserves, and the second-largest mineral resource base globally, containing 193 ounces of gold.

=== Operating mines ===
Asset	Region	2019 Production	2018 Production	Proven and probable reserves
Olimpiada	Krasnoyarsk Krai	1389.2 koz	1,321.7 koz	26.0 moz
Blagodatnoye	Krasnoyarsk Krai	420.8 koz	415.8 koz	9.1 moz
Verninskoye	Irkutsk Oblast	255.9 koz	219.4 koz	4.8 moz
Kuranakh	Sakha Republic	224.7 koz	198.9 koz	4.3 moz
Natalka	Magadan Oblast	405 koz	132.7 koz	15.4 moz
Alluvial deposits in the Bodaybinsky District	Irkutsk Oblast	145.6 koz	145.7 koz	0.8 moz

=== Development and exploration ===
- Sukhoi Log: one of the world's most significant gold greenfield projects. Estimated gold reserves are 962 million tons of ore, grading 2.1 grams per ton of gold, for 63 million ounces of contained gold.
- Other deposits in Krasnoyarsk Krai, Amur Oblast and Irkutsk Oblast

== Sukhoi Log ==
Sukhoi Log is one of the largest undeveloped gold deposits in the world. Its development could increase Russia's gold production by more than 20%, strengthening the country's position among the global leaders in this sector.

In 2022, Polyus carried out a reengineering of the project. Sukhoi Log is a significant investment project in Russia's gold mining sector, with total investments estimated at $6 billion.

In 2024, pilot-scale ore processing from the Sukhoi Log deposit began at the Verninskaya processing plant, utilizing similar technologies and the advantage of geographical proximity. By October 2024, the first tonne of gold had already been produced as part of this initiative.

== Ownership ==
Main owner as of 2021: Said Kerimov (76.34% of shares). 21.85% of the shares are in free circulation, and the company's management holds 1.03% of the shares. In 2022, Said Kerimov sold 29.99% of Polyus to Acropol Group (which belongs to Akhmet Palankoev) and gave 46.35% to the Fund for Support of Islamic Foundations in Russia. https://polyus.com/en/media/press-releases/changes-in-shareholder-structure/

In July 2023, the Board of Directors of Polyus announced a share buyback program. It is planned to acquire approximately 30% of the stake. The Board of Directors allocated 579 billion rubles for these purposes. At the time of the announcement of the offer, the buyback price (14.2 thousand rubles per share) was one-third higher than the market price.

== Carbon footprint ==
Polyus Gold reported Total CO2e emissions (Direct + Indirect) for 31 December 2020 at 2,020 Kt (-380 /-15.8% y-o-y). The decline accelerated compared to the CAGR of -8.6% since 4Q'16.

Polyus Gold's Total CO2e emissions (Direct + Indirect) (in kilotonnes)
Dec 2014	Dec 2015	Dec 2016	Dec 2017	Dec 2018	Dec 2019	Dec 2020
3,250	3,290	3,170	3,100	2,380	2,400	2,020
