= Intraplate deformation =

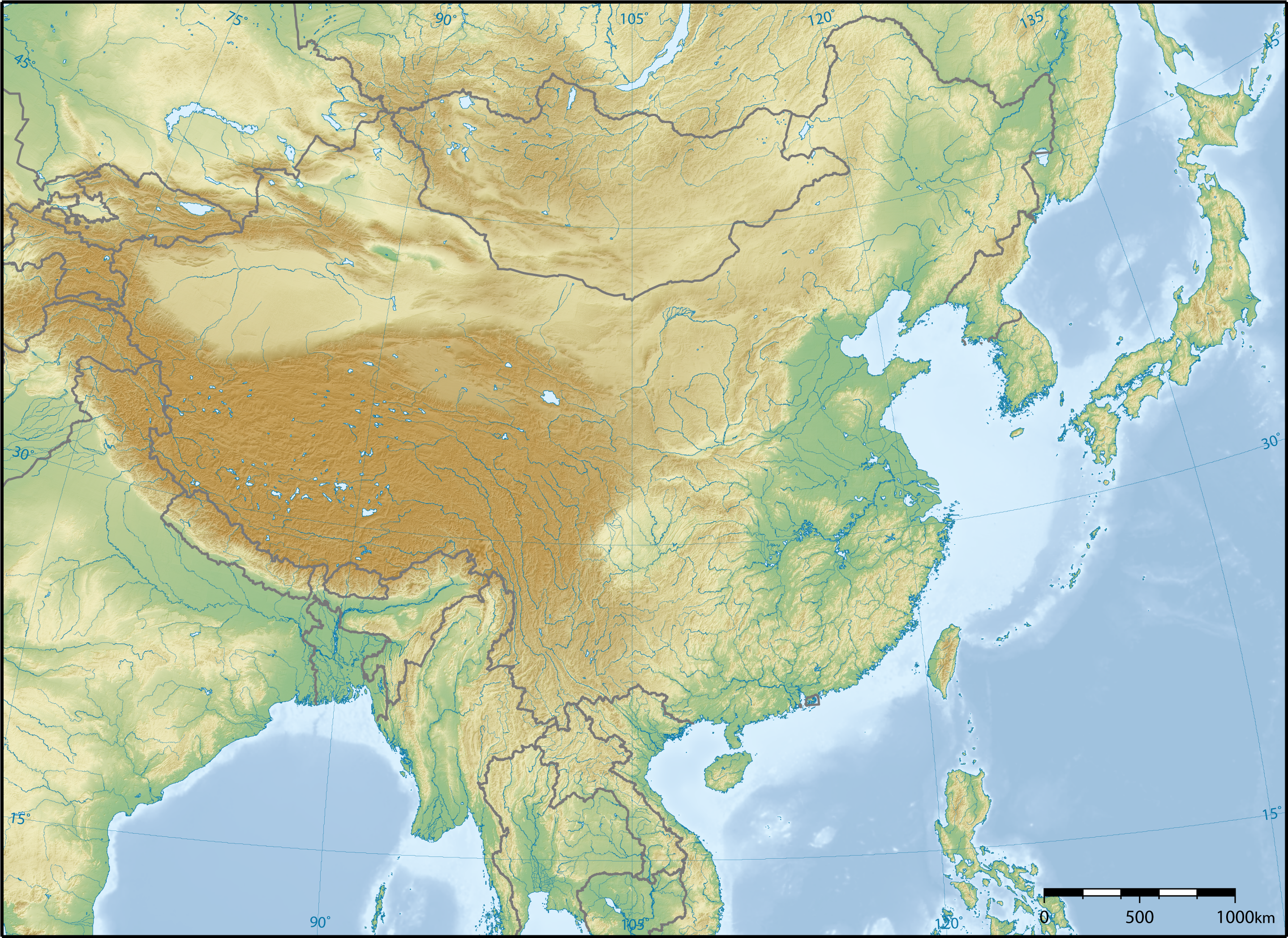
Figure 1: East Asia topographic map. The large brown area is the Tibetan plateau and the Tien Shan mountains to the northwest. Almost the whole central landmass in view is deformed from the collision of India into Asia around 50 million years ago.

Intraplate deformation is the folding, breaking, or flow of the Earth's crust within plates instead of at their margins. This process usually occurs in areas with especially weak crust and upper mantle, such as the Tibetan Plateau (Figure 1). Intraplate deformation brings another aspect to plate tectonic theory.

== Crustal deformation processes ==
The theory of plate tectonics states that the Earth's lithosphere (crust and upper mantle) is made up of rigid plates that "float" on top of the asthenosphere (lower mantle) and move relative to one another. As the plates move, the crust deforms dominantly along the plate margins. Intraplate deformation differs from that respect by the observation that deformation can occur anywhere the crust is weak and not just at plate margins.

Deformation is the folding, breaking, or flow of rocks. There are many different types of crustal deformation depending on whether the rocks are brittle or ductile. The aspects that determine these properties are due to certain temperatures and pressures that rocks experience within the Earth. Therefore, temperature and pressure control deformation processes. Ductile rocks tend to bend, fold, stretch, or flow due to compressional or extensional forces. Brittle rocks, on the other hand, tend to break. The zone where the crust breaks is termed a fault. There are three main types of faults: normal faults, reverse faults and strike slip (transform) faults. All of these are ways the crust can deform is due to the different types of plate margins, which are: divergent boundaries, convergent boundaries, and transform boundaries.

These three boundaries do not always form perfectly and this can lead to a mixed boundary. Mixed boundaries can be a combination of a transform with convergence or a transform with divergence.

== Intraplate deformation examples ==
=== Asia ===
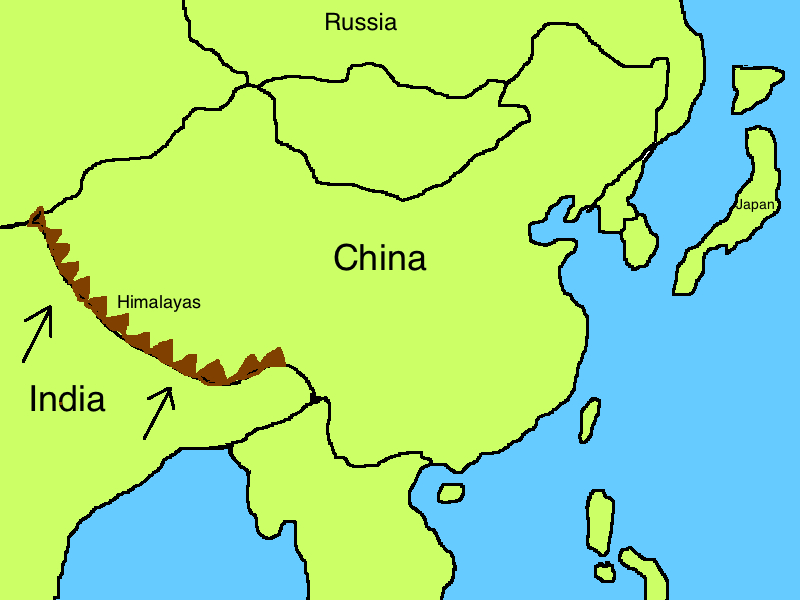
Figure 2: Same image as Figure 1 but without any intraplate deformation throughout Asia from the India-Asia collision.

Central/East Asia is possibly the best example of large-scale intraplate deformation. The formation and uplift of the Tibetan plateau and the Himalayan mountain range started in the Cenozoic era around 50 million years ago when the Indian plate collided with the Eurasian plate. The collision caused much shortening of the lithosphere, adding to increased crustal thickness and high stress in the Himalaya/Tibet region.

Many geophysical observations in Tibet show a weak crustal zone and suggest that the middle to lower crust may contain fluids and be partially melted. As the Himalayan-Tibet region began to rise, lateral extrusion of the crust in the Tibetan plateau gradually became the dominant mechanism for accommodating the collision and crustal shortening. The lateral extrusion is sliding dominantly to the east and out of India's path. Eastern Tibet is traditionally interpreted as being part of a broad accommodation zone. Much of the eastern movement is due to major strike-slip faults. These strike-slip faults, along with the other faults in Tibet could still be interpreted as on a plate margin though. True intraplate deformation occurs farther north in areas such as Mongolia or the Tian Shan mountains. These areas display true intraplate deformation because there is still much faulting and folding to accommodate some of the crustal shortening from the India/Eurasia collision hundreds of kilometers away from the plate margin.

== See also ==
- Alice Springs Orogeny
- Intraplate earthquake
- Lower crustal flow
- North Atlantic breakup
