= Pisarev =

Pisarev (masculine, Russian: Писарев) or Pisareva (feminine, Russian: Писарева) is a Russian surname. Notable people with the surname include:

- Aleksander Pisarev (1803–1828), Russian playwright
- Andrey Pisarev (born 1962), Russian pianist
- Dmitry Pisarev (1840–1868), Russian writer and social critic
- Igor Pisarev (1931–2001), Soviet sprint canoer
- Kirill Pisarev (born 1969), Russian entrepreneur and investor
- Mariya Pisareva (born 1934), Soviet high jumper
- Modest Pisarev (1844–1905), Russian stage actor and theatre critic
- Nikolai Pisarev (born 1968), Russian soccer manager and former player
- Vadim Pisarev (born 1965), Ukrainian dancer
