= Villa Hier =

House in France

Coordinates: 43.548°N 7.128°E

The Villa Hier at 374 Avenue Mrs L-D Beaumont is a house in Cap d'Antibes. It was designed by the American architect Barry Dierks for the British real estate developer Anthony Edgar Somers. It is listed on the Inventaire général du patrimoine culturel.

The Villa Hier was sold to Swiru Holding AG, a company based in Switzerland for €35 million in 2008. French investigators subsequently found hidden payments that indicated the actual purchase price had been €127 million and that taxes had been avoided on the sale. The ownership of the house has been linked to the Russian billionaire Suleyman Kerimov. He was charged in 2017 by French authorities in relation to "suspicions that he used figureheads to acquire several Riviera properties". The Villa Hier was seized by French tax authorities as a result of the case. The case was overturned in 2019. The ultimate beneficial owner of the Villa Hier is Suleiman Kerimov's daughter.

The house includes a large oval outdoor swimming pool and a tennis court.

The house was the setting for the 1988 film Dirty Rotten Scoundrels starring Michael Caine and Steve Martin.
