= Sergei Gordeev =

Russian billionaire businessman and politician

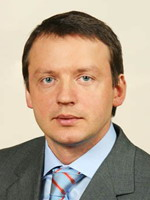
- Sergei Gordeev
- Born: 22 November 1972 (age 53)
- Education: Togliatti Academy of Management
- Occupation: Property developer

Sergei Eduardovich Gordeev (Russian: Серге́й Эдуа́рдович Горде́ев, born 22 November 1972) is a Russian billionaire businessman, and the main shareholder and former CEO of PIK Group, a Russian real estate firm. His net worth was estimated at US$8 billion in 2021. He lives in Moscow.

== Career ==
=== Early career ===
In 1995, Gordeev founded the company "Rosbuilding", which he led until March 1998. Rosbuilding focused on repurposing and restructuring of industrial enterprises, construction sites, retail venues and department stores. In 2006, Rosbuilding's shareholders agreed to close down the company and terminate its business activities. Rosbuilding was disbanded and liquidated.

In 2007, Gordeev founded the Horus Capital property development company, specialising in the construction and redevelopment of office and residential buildings. The company's portfolio included 15 sites with a total area of over 550 thousand square meters. In 2010, Gordeev sold Horus-Capital to O1 Properties, owned by billionaire Boris Mints.

In July 2008, at the initiative of Gordeev, the Federation Council unanimously supported a parliamentary request to the Government of the Russian Federation to make significant changes to the application of the federal law “Protection of Cultural Heritage Sites”. As a result of the request, 35 architectural monuments were taken under state protection. During the term, Gordeev submitted to the State Duma a number of draft laws and amendments aiming to improve protection of the Russian cultural heritage.

=== PIK ===
In 2013, Gordeev partnered with the entrepreneur Alexander Mamut to acquire a stake in PIK from a subsidiary of the Suleyman Kerimov Foundation. Since 2014, Sergei Gordeev has been the CEO and Chairman of the management board of PIK. As of the end of 2020, Sergei Gordeev was the controlling shareholder of PIK and owned 59.15% of the company's shares.

In 2022, Gordeev left the position of PIK Group CEO.

=== Hyperloop ===
Gordeev was actively involved with the initial investment phase of Hyperloop One, a high-speed travel start-up. Virgin Hyperloop, formerly known as Hyperloop One, is working towards commercializing a high-speed technology system with the aim of moving passengers and cargo at the speed of airlines, but at the fraction of the cost of airline travel. The concept was first introduced by Elon Musk in 2013.

=== Politics ===
In 2005–2010, Gordeev was a member of the Federation Council chamber of the Russian Parliament, first, until July 2007, representing the Ust-Orda Buryat Autonomous Okrug and then, until December 2010, representing the Perm Region. At the Federation Council, Gordeev was a member of the Culture Commission.

In 2010, Gordeev announced that he was ending his political career to focus on his business interests. In an interview to fellow entrepreneur Oleg Tinkov, Gordeev said that from his experience he wouldn't recommend other businessmen to go into politics and that his own move into politics was driven by idealism.

== Philanthropy ==
In 2006, he created the Russian Avant-garde non-profit foundation, dedicated to preserving the cultural heritage of the Russian avant-garde and publishing books on the history of avant-garde in Russia. Since then, more than 80 books were published by the Foundation.

In the same year, Gordeev bought the Melnikov House in Moscow. Built in 1927, the house previously belonged to Konstantin Melnikov, a Russian architect and painter who was considered a leader in the avant-garde movement. Gordeev had it refurbished and turned into a public museum, and donated it to the state. He also donated his collection of architectural graphics featuring works of Leonidov, Zholtovsky, Chernikhov, Vesninykh and Fomin to the Schusev Museum of Architecture.

Gordeev restored the Narkomfin building, designed by Moisei Ginsburg in the late 1920s, and one of the most significant constructivist buildings in Moscow.

In 2008–2009, Gordeev played a role in the creation of the Perm Museum of Contemporary Art in Perm, central Russia. As the abandoned city river station was chosen as the venue for the new museum, Gordeev launched an international competition for renovating the building. Several world-famous architectural companies took part in the competition. In May 2010, Perm projects, the Museum of Modern Art and the Opera and Ballet Theatre, both financed by Gordeev, were award the Grand Prix of the Moscow Biennale of Architecture.

In 2008, Gordeev was nominated for the Innovation 2008 award at the Russian national modern visual arts competition for the “Russian Poor” exhibition in Perm, at which Gordeev collaborated with Marat Gelman. In 2010, Gordeev was awarded a diploma for his contribution to the development of the city of Perm. In 2011, the "Stanislavsky Factory" project, led by Gordeev and the British architectural design firm John McAslan + Partners, was named the best international project of the year by the RIBA International Awards. The project was also shortlisted by the World Architecture Festival in the New, Old and Regenerated City Quarters category. In 2012, the same project received a Civic Trust Award.
