= Lower crustal flow =

Movement of material in the Earth's crust

In geodynamics lower crustal flow is the mainly lateral movement of material within the lower part of the continental crust by a ductile flow mechanism. It is thought to be an important process during both continental collision and continental break-up.

== Rheology ==
The tendency of the lower crust to flow is controlled by its rheology. Ductile flow in the lower crust is assumed to be controlled by the deformation of quartz and/or plagioclase feldspar as its composition is thought to be granodioritic to dioritic. With normal thickness continental crust and a normal geothermal gradient, the lower crust, below the brittle–ductile transition zone, exhibits ductile flow behaviour under geological strain rates. Factors that can vary this behaviour include: water content, thickness, heat flow and strain-rate.

== Collisional belts ==
In some areas of continental collision, the lower part of the thickened crust that results is interpreted to flow laterally, such as in the Tibetan Plateau, and the Altiplano in the Bolivian Andes.
