= Said Kerimov =

Russian businessman

Said Suleymanovich Kerimov
- Born: July 6, 1995 (age 31); Moscow, Russia
- Occupation: Businessman
- Father: Suleyman Kerimov

Said Kerimov (Abusaid, born July 6, 1995) is a Russian businessman who is the son of Russian billionaire and politician Suleyman Kerimov. In 2015, he became a majority shareholder in Polyus Gold, Russia's largest gold producer, when his father transferred shares over to Said.

During the 2022 Russian Invasion of Ukraine, Kerimov resigned from the board of Polyus Gold on first week of April 2022, while at the same time his family sold its stake in the company worth $6.3 billion which resulted in the family losing majority shareholder position at Polyus Gold.

== Early life ==
Kerimov was born in Moscow, in the Russia. The Kerimar, correspondent to the Kerimov family in Lezgin kinship, belongs to the Tvarkar sikhil (Lezgin clan).

== Career ==
In 2014, Kerimov acquired Russia's cinema chain, Cinema Park from Vladimir Potanin for an estimated $385 million. Cinema Park was sold in 2017 to Alexander Mamut.

In 2017, Kerimov took over the control of the bankrupt Makhachkala Airport.

== Sanctions ==
In January 2023 Japan imposed sanctions on Said Kerimov.

== PJSC Polyus ==
In 2015, Kerimov became a majority shareholder in Polyus Gold, Russia's largest gold producer, when his father Suleyman transferred shares over to Said. In the same year Polyus Gold announced that it was delisting from the London Stock Exchange (LSE) and rebranded as PJSC Polyus.

In July 2017, Polyus was re-admitted to the London Stock Exchange. As of end 2020, Kerimov owned about 77% shares of the company. In 2021 he sold part of his stake and gave the remaining to the Fund for support of Islamic foundations.
