= Suleyman Kerimov =

Russian businessman and oligarch

- Сулейман Керимов
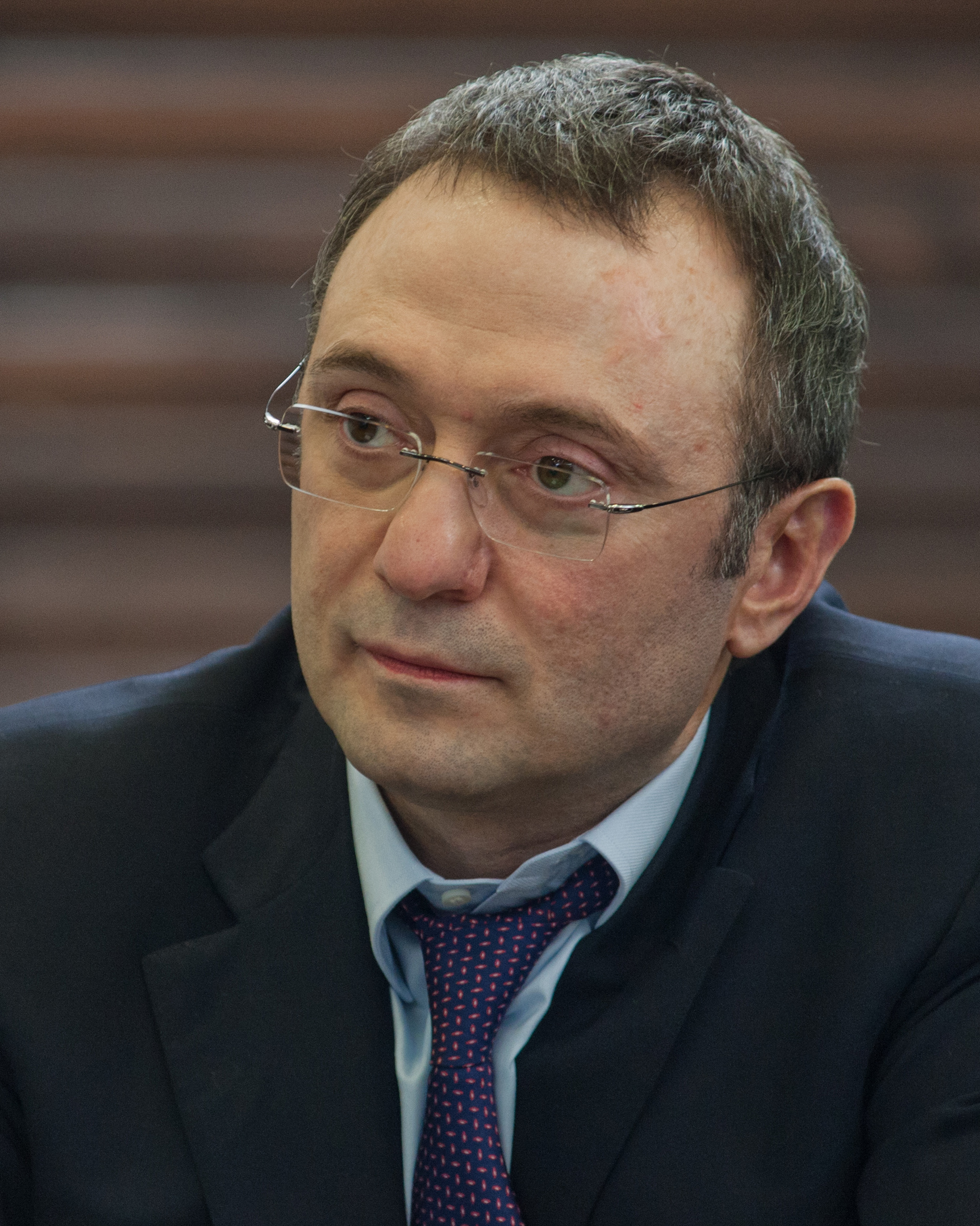
- Kerimov in 2010

Russian Federation Senator from Dagestan
- Incumbent
- Assumed office 20 February 2008

Member of the State Duma
- In office 19 December 1999 – 24 December 2007

Personal details
- Born: Suleyman Abusaidovich Kerimov; 12 March 1966 (age 60) Derbent, Dagestan, USSR
- Children: 3, including Said Kerimov
- Education: Dagestan State University
- Website: Suleyman Kerimov Foundation

Suleyman Abusaidovich Kerimov (Russian: Сулейма́н Абусаи́дович Кери́мов; Lezgian: Керимрин Абусаидан хва Сулейман; born 12 March 1966) is a Russian billionaire, oligarch, philanthropist and politician of Lezgin descent. Kerimov maintains close ties to Vladimir Putin's administration in Russia, and formerly enjoyed a close relationship with Ramzan Kadyrov, the strongman of Chechnya. More recently, Kerimov and Kadyrov have fallen out.

He entered politics in the 1990s. By 1999, he had gained control of Nafta Moskva, a former state oil trader. In the 2000s, Kerimov secured billions of dollars in loans from major Russian state‑owned banks, such as Sberbank and VTB. Through these loans, he acquired substantial stakes in Gazprom and Uralkali, as well as Sberbank. By 2008, his fortune had reached $21 billion, although by 2022 it had declined to $11 billion.

Since 2008, Kerimov has represented the Republic of Dagestan in the Federation Council of Russia.

In 2011, he bought the football club FC Anzhi Makhachkala, which subsequently made a series of high‑profile signings. The club acquired Samuel Eto'o, making him the highest‑paid player in the world. In 2013, Kerimov drastically and abruptly reduced the team's funding, leading to a firesale of players.

In April 2018, he was placed under sanctions by the United States Department of the Treasury. In the wake of the 2022 Russian invasion of Ukraine, Kerimov was sanctioned as a Russian oligarch with close ties to President Putin by the US, the UK and the EU on 15 March 2022. Suleiman Kerimov has been the subject of scrutiny in the United States for a number of years.

In April 2022, Kerimov's son Said Kerimov resigned from the board of Polyus Gold and the family sold its stake in the company, valued at $6.3 billion, thereby relinquishing the position of majority shareholder.

== Early life and education ==
Kerimov was born on 12 March 1966 in Derbent, Dagestan, into a Dagestani Lezgin family, he belongs to the Lezgin sikhil (clan) Tvarkar. His ancestral village is said to be Karakyure in the Dokuzparinsky District. He graduated from high school in 1983 and subsequently enrolled in the Civil Engineering Department at the Dagestan Polytechnic Institute in 1984, although his obligatory military service in the Soviet Army interrupted his studies barely a year later. After completing his service in 1986, Kerimov resumed his studies at Dagestan State University, from which he graduated with a degree in financial accounting and economics in 1989. While a student, he served as deputy chairman of the university's Trade Union Committee. It was also at university that Kerimov met his wife, Firuza, the daughter of a former trade union leader.

Kerimov has said that he had dreamed of making money from an early age, an ambition that later prompted him to leave his native Dagestan in the early 1990s.

== Career ==
=== Early career ===
Soon after his university graduation in 1989, Kerimov took a job as an economist at the Eltav electrical plant in Makhachkala, the capital of Dagestan. The state-controlled plant supplied transistors and semi-conductors to television-makers, while also producing diodes, microchips and halogen lamps. Kerimov was paid 150 roubles (approximately $250 dollars) a month and he and his wife lived in a worker's hostel attached to the plant, where they shared one room of a two-room flat.

Eventually, Kerimov rose to the rank of Deputy Director General at Eltav and began to dabble in investing during the fall of the Soviet Union.

=== Fedprombank ===
In 1993, Kerimov was put in charge of handling relations between Eltav and Fedprombank, a Moscow bank established by the electrical company. Fedprombank financed lagging industries and Kerimov and his associates soon became creditors to large utility companies, allowing them to continue providing key services. Once the Russian economy stabilized, the debts were repaid with hefty returns for Fedprombank and, consequently, Kerimov.

In 1995, Kerimov was appointed to head the banking and trading company Soyuz-Finans, and by 1997, Kerimov had built a 50% stake in Vnukovo Airlines and used his leverage to take over Fedprombank, buying out his partners' shares.

=== Nafta Moskva ===
In late 1999, Kerimov bought a 55% stake in the oil trading company Nafta Moskva, the successor to the Soviet monopoly firm Soyuznefteexport, for $50 million. By 2000, he had increased his stake of Nafta Moskva to 100%. Kerimov undertook a mass restructuring of the company, selling off all of the oil-related aspects and creating an investment and holding company. Nafta's investments in the mid-2000s included purchase of the business center Smolensky Passazh and AvtoBank.

=== Gazprom and Sberbank investments ===
In 2003, Kerimov managed to secure a $43 million loan from the state-owned Vnesheconombank, which he invested in the oil and gas company Gazprom. Within the next year, share prices for the Russian gas company doubled and Kerimov was able to pay off the entirety of the loan within four months. In 2004 Sberbank, now the largest bank in Russia and Eastern Europe, provided Kerimov with a loan of $3.2 billion, which was later repaid, and these funds were also invested in equities. By 2008, Kerimov had amassed a 5% stake in Gazprom, a 6% stake in Sberbank, along with an estimated fortune of $17.5 billion, making him the 36th richest man in the world. However, in mid-2008, Kerimov sold all his Gazprom and Sberbank shares.

=== Polymetal ===
In November 2005, Kerimov's Nafta Moskva acquired JSC Polymetal, one of Russia's largest gold and silver mining companies. In 2007, he took the company public on the London Stock Exchange, then sold 70% of his shares in 2008 before gold would go on to climb to an all-time high in 2011. In 2008, Kerimov sold control over Polymetal.

=== Role in the 2008 financial crisis ===
As markets around the world began to tighten in 2007, Kerimov and his associates expected that Russia would suffer more than the West from the 2008 financial crisis. A concerted effort was thus made to build closer ties with Western banks. Kerimov decreased his stakes in Gazprom and other Russian blue chips and approached Wall Street, proposing to invest the vast majority of his fortune to defend the institutions from short-sellers. In return, it was expected that Kerimov would receive favorable lending terms for future loans.

In 2007, Kerimov invested billions in Morgan Stanley, Goldman Sachs, Deutsche Bank, Credit Suisse and other financial institutions. Though neither Kerimov nor the Western banks have disclosed the exact size of his investment, it was sizeable enough for Kerimov to receive a call from the United States Treasury during the darkest days of the economic crisis imploring the Russian oligarch not to sell his stakes.

=== Polyus Gold ===
Following his losses during the 2008 financial crisis, Kerimov shifted his investment strategy to buying stakes large enough to influence the strategies of the companies he invests in. In 2009, Nafta Moskva bought a $1.3 billion stake (37% stake) in OAO Polyus Gold, Russia's largest gold producer, from Vladimir Potanin.

Later the stake was increased up to 40.2%. In 2012 the company held an IPO on the London Stock Exchange.

In 2015 Kerimov's share in Polyus Gold was transferred to his son, Said.

=== Property developer PIK Group ===
In the spring of 2009, shareholders of Russia's construction giant PIK Group sold 25% of their company's shares to Kerimov. PIK required extra funding after their debt level reached $1.98 billion, and the value of their capital fell by more than 40 times to $279.9 million. Nafta Moskva later increased its stake in PIK Group to 38.3%.

In December 2013 Kerimov sold his shares to property investor Sergei Gordeev and businessman Alexander Mamut, who owns a stake in precious metals miner Polymetal.

=== Uralkali ===
In June 2010, Kerimov and his partners Alexander Nesis and Filaret Galchev together paid Dmitry Rybolovlev an estimated $5.3 billion for a 53% stake in Russian potash giant Uralkali, which, together with Belaruskali, at the time made up the duopoly that controlled 70% of the global potash market: the Belarusian Potash Company (BPC). Kerimov secured substantial loans from Russia's VTB bank for the Uralkali takeover.

In July 2013, Uralkali announced it was pulling out of the BPC cartel, dropping prices and increasing production to maximum capacity in a grab for market share. The immediate consequences on the global economy were a 25% drop in potash prices to around $340 a tonne, harming the prospects of both Canadian producers and the Belarusian economy. Belarusian authorities estimate they may lose up to $1 billion a year.

Two weeks after Uralkali's July announcement, Belarusian prime minister Mikhail Myasnikovich responded by inviting Kerimov and the Uralkali managers to Minsk to discuss the current situation. Uralkali's then-CEO Vladislav Baumgertner attended in Kerimov's place and was arrested by state security forces and charged with "abuse of power".

In the meantime, Belarus also opened a criminal investigation into other Uralkali employees and its main shareholder Suleyman Kerimov. Baumgertner was held in a Belarusian KGB jail until a plan to change ownership of Uralkali was announced, and Belarus then extradited Baumgertner to Russia. Belarus put Kerimov on the national wanted list, and also requested Interpol to publish a Red Notice for him. Interpol clarified later that no Red Notice had been issued and that the request was political in nature. The Belarusian authorities later withdrew the case against Kerimov and closed the criminal investigation. By December 2013, Kerimov sold 21.75% of Uralkali shares to Mikhail Prokhorov for US$3.7 billion and 19,99% (for approximately US$2.9 billion) to Uralchem.

=== Media portrayal of business style ===
Forbes magazine describes Kerimov as one of the most private Russian billionaires, who has not given a single interview over 20 years in business.

Moscow Times quoted a former deputy editor of Forbes Russia Kirill Vishnepolsky as describing Kerimov as a "Russian Warren Buffett" for a similarly astute investment style. A senior Moscow banker is reported to have said of Kerimov: "Sometimes it is difficult to talk to him. He is always a few steps ahead of you. For foreigners, it is next to impossible, even those used to a Russian environment. He is very quick and creative, in a sense that ideas come to him that don't come to other people". Kerimov reportedly made extensive use of leverage for his investments, according to financiers and bankers active in Russia.

== Other investments ==
=== FC Anzhi Makhachkala ===
In 2011, Kerimov purchased FC Anzhi Makhachkala, his hometown football club which competes in the Russian Premier League.

In March 2012, it was reported that Kerimov had given the club a summer transfer budget of over €230 million, in an attempt to qualify for the UEFA Champions League within the next three seasons.

Apart from FC Anzhi, Kerimov financed the construction of a modern football stadium Anzhi Arena for 30,000 spectators and teams from Anzhi's Youth Football Academy.

In August 2013, as a part of new long-term strategy for the club, it was decided to scale back the club's annual budget by $50–70 million, down from their previous outlay of $180 million a season. The club sold some international players and recruited Russian young players instead.

Kerimov sold the club to Osman Kadiyev on 28 December 2016.

== Business controversies and investigations ==
=== Business controversy over Nafta Moskva ===
Shortly after Kerimov bought into Nafta Moskva, the company found itself in a conflict with businessman Andrei Andreev. Andreev's assets were transferred to Nafta Moskva, Millhouse Capital and Basic Element. Further dispute brought the parties to the court.

In July 2004 Andreev and Nafta Moskva reached an amicable settlement and the dispute was resolved.

=== Moskva Hotel ownership and associated issues ===
Nafta Moskva, controlled by Kerimov, acquired a 25% stake in the Hotel Moskva project, a multibillion-dollar project to construct a replica of the enormous Stalin-era luxury hotel demolished in 2004. in February 2009, closing the deal by January 2010. In September 2010, Member of Russian Parliament Ashot Egiazaryan accused Kerimov of conspiring with the city government of Moscow to forcibly acquire his 25% stake in the project. After claiming he received death threats, Egiazaryan fled to the United States to seek asylum and filed lawsuits in a civil court in Cyprus, the London Court of International Arbitration and on Capitol Hill claiming that a campaign of threats of criminal prosecution and armed police raids forced him to give up his shares. According to Kerimov's lawyer Mr Egiazaryan transferred his interest in the Moskva Hotel as part of a legitimate business deal but was overextended and was deep in debt. Mr Egiazaryan was facing financial ruin.

Pending deliberation by the courts, Kerimov's assets were frozen, upsetting Uralkali's $39 billion joint bid with Chinese company Sinochem for the Canadian Potash Corp. The Nicosia district court in Cyprus lifted Kerimov's billion dollar asset freeze in February 2011, arguing that the plaintiffs "failed to prove the urgency of their petition." According to Egiazaryan's lawyer, Andreas Haviaras, the Cyprus ruling was based on "technicalities" and did not prejudge the merits of the case.

The hotel reopened in 2014 under the Four Seasons brand. In October 2015, Suleiman Kerimov sold his interest in the property to businessmen Yury and Alexey Khotin for an undisclosed amount.

=== French tax evasion case ===
In November 2017, Kerimov was arrested by French police at Nice airport in connection with a tax evasion case concerning his alleged purchase of several luxury residences on the French Riviera via shell companies. The charges were dismissed the following June. In March 2019, French prosecutors placed Kerimov under formal investigation "on suspicion of complicity in tax fraud". He was released on bail of €20 million and his lawyer plans to appeal the accusation of fraud.

=== Sanctions ===
In April 2018, the United States imposed sanctions on Kerimov and 23 other Russian nationals.

Kerimov is one of many Russian oligarchs named in the Countering America's Adversaries Through Sanctions Act, CAATSA, signed into law by President Donald Trump in 2017. He was also sanctioned by the UK government on 15 March 2022 in relation to the Russo-Ukrainian War.

== Political career ==
From 1999 to 2003, Kerimov was a member of the State Duma of the 3rd Convocation, the lower house of the Federal Assembly of Russia, as well as a member of the State Duma Committee for Security. From 2003 to 2007, while continuing his role on the Committee for Security, he was also a member of the 4th Convocation and Deputy Chairman of the State Duma Committee for Physical Education, Sports and Youth. He first gained a seat in parliament with the Liberal Democratic Party, led by Vladimir Zhirinovsky.

Since 2008, Kerimov has served as a member of the Federation Council of the Federation Assembly of the Russian Federation – the upper house of the Federation Assembly – and represents the Republic of Dagestan. In response to the Russian parliament's passage of a bill prohibiting government officials from holding foreign-issued securities and bank accounts abroad, Kerimov transferred his assets to the trusts controlled by Suleyman Kerimov Foundation, a charity registered in Switzerland, in May 2013. This way, he retained both his position in the Federation Council and beneficiary rights to his business assets. Later, Kerimov's son Said became the sole beneficiary of the said trusts. Suleiman Kerimov was re-elected to the Federation Council in September 2016.

== Conflict with Ramzan Kadyrov ==
In October 2024, the Chechen strongman Ramzan Kadyrov said he was ready to formally declare a blood feud against Kerimov and two Russian State Duma members who he said were planning to order his assassination. In a post on Telegram on the evening of October 9, Kadyrov said he had held a meeting with commanders and heads of Chechnya's security forces. Along with the post, he also posted a nine-minute video with excerpts from the meeting, in which he speaks mostly in Chechen.

As TASS reports, Kadyrov mentioned Kerimov and State Duma deputies Bekkhan Barakhoev and Rizvan Kurbanov "in the context of the incident in the Wildberries office." At the same time, in the video, Kadyrov speaks part of the text in Russian. In his speech the names of Kerimov and two deputies can indeed be heard, but at this point the head of Chechnya is no longer talking about Wildberries.

Sergey Melikov, Putin-appointed head of Dagestan, supported Kerimov, claiming that the latter 'can count on the support of the Dagestani people'.

== Personal life ==
Kerimov's father was a lawyer at a criminal investigation institution, while his mother was an accountant for the Savings Bank of Russia. He is married and has three children.

In October 2011, Kerimov used his connections to fly Western financial figures such as Jamie Dimon of JPMorgan, Richard Parsons of Citigroup and Stephen Schwarzman of Blackstone to Moscow in support of Medvedev's initiative to turn Moscow into an "international financial centre".

=== Wealth ===
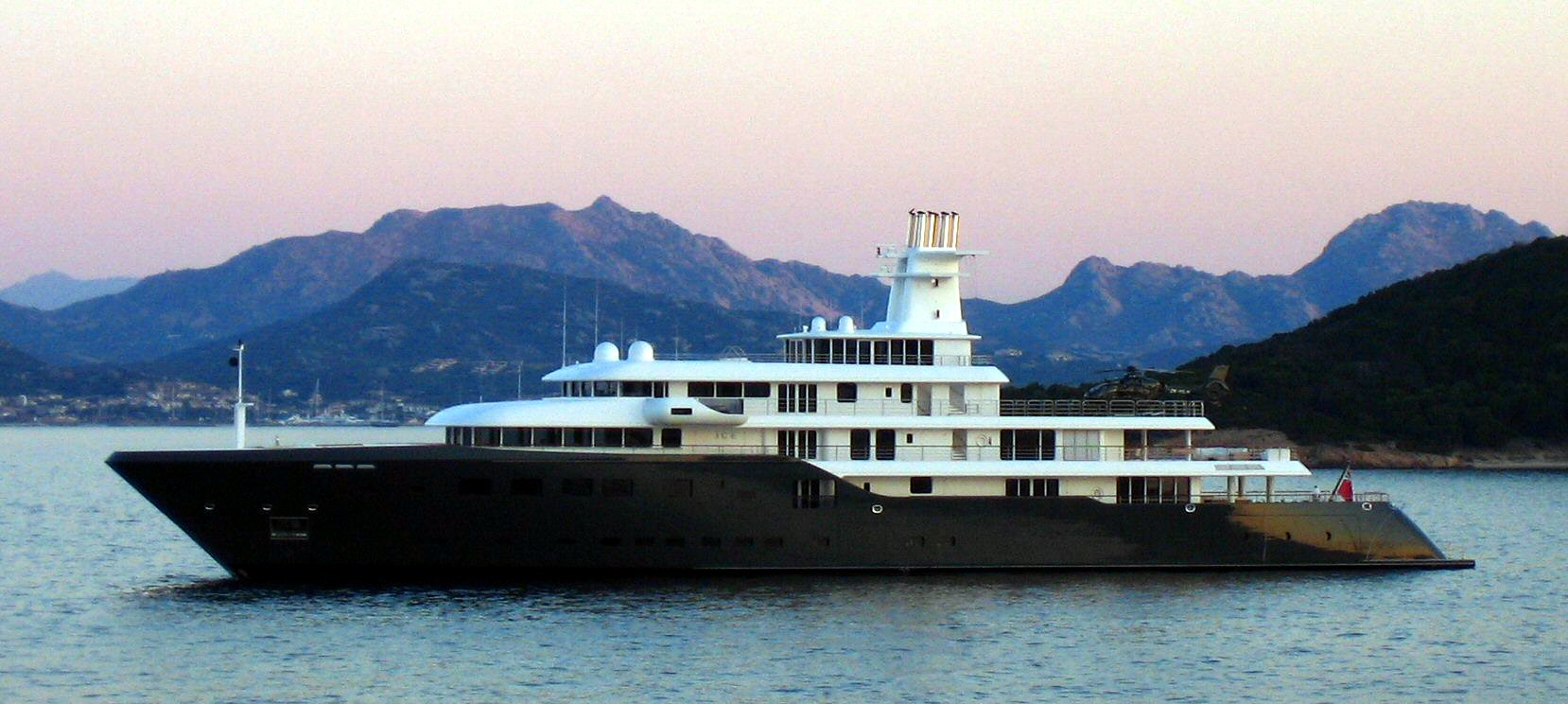
From 2005 to 2015, Suleyman Kerimov owned the superyacht, Ice.

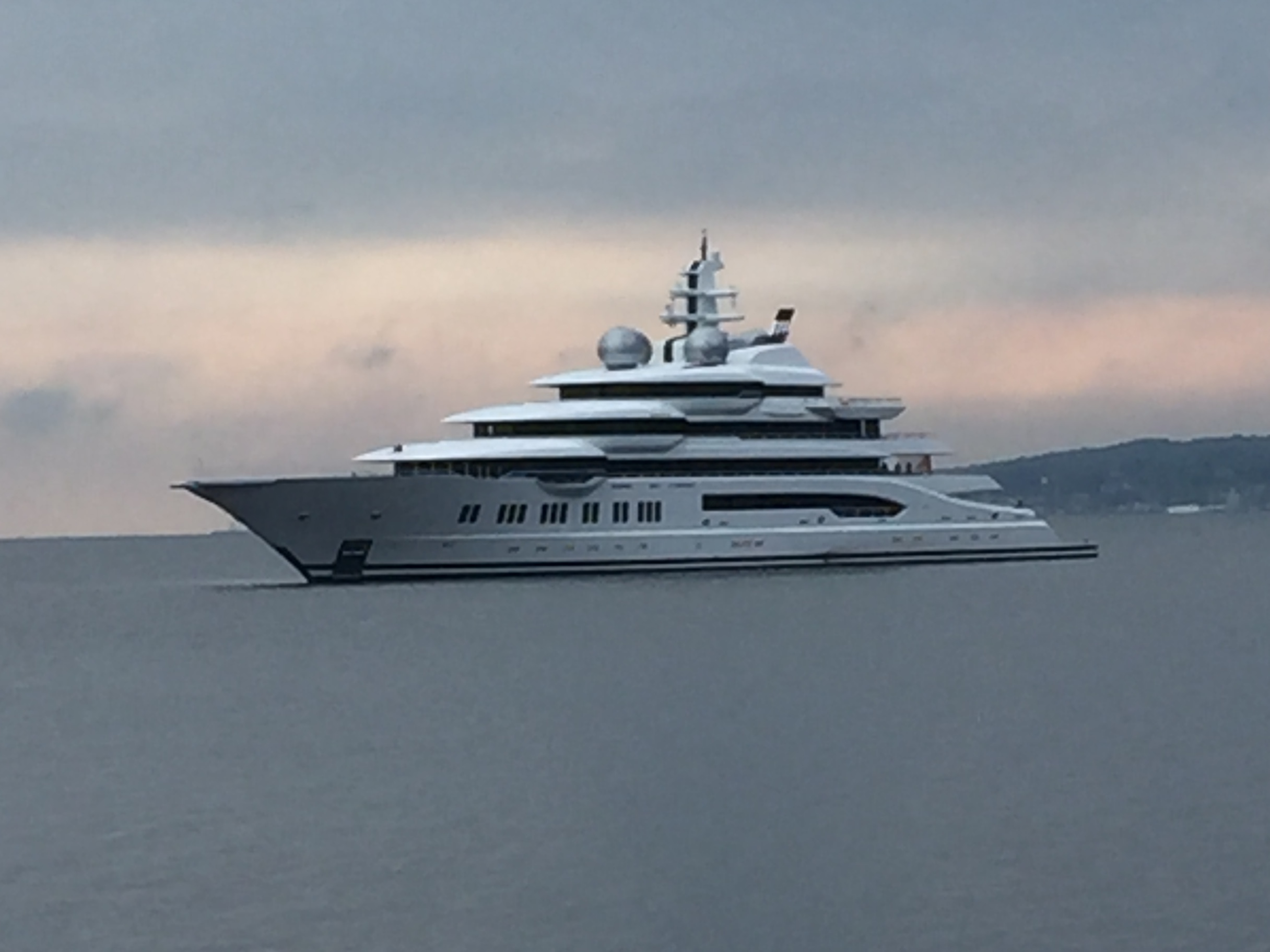
The superyacht Amadea

In 2006 Kerimov was listed among the world's 100 richest people and as Russia's eighth richest man ranked by Forbes. He had a net worth of $6.9 billion as of 2014, with the previous years' net worth estimated at $7.1 billion (2013) and $6.5 billion (2012).

In 2020, Kerimov's fortune doubled due to a sharp rise in gold prices. In August 2020, he became the richest businessman in Russia for a while. His family's fortune, almost entirely based on the 77 percent holding in gold company Polyus, was estimated at $24.7 billion. At the end of 2020, the value of the assets of the Kerimov family was estimated at $20.9 billion. By 2022, his wealth had decreased to $11 billion. He keeps vast assets through networks of offshore companies.

He owns a villa in Cap d'Antibes, France (Villa Hier). On 26 November 2006, in Nice, France, Kerimov was seriously injured after losing control of a $650,000 Ferrari Enzo on the Promenade des Anglais. He suffered severe burns as a result of the accident.

Known for spending much of his fortune on parties, the Russian billionaire has paid for celebrities such as Christina Aguilera, Shakira, Amy Winehouse and Jessie J to perform at his events.

From 2005 to 2015, Kerimov owned one of the world's largest private yachts, which is known as Ice. Previously known as Air, she was built by German company Lürssen in 2005. Ice measures 295 feet (90 metres) in length, and can reach a speed of 18.6 knots (34.4 km/h; 21.4 mph). She has won the Superyacht of the Year award at the World Superyacht Awards in 2006, and is currently the 78th largest yacht in the world. He sold Ice to the Ministry of Defence for the Republic of Equatorial Guinea in 2015.

In 2022 there were reports that he was the owner of the superyacht Amadea. In April 2022, it was seized by Fiji police at Lautoka Port as Fijian high court granted a restraining order to Fiji Police to restrain it for being allegedly linked with Kerimov. In May 2022, Fiji's High Court ruled that US authorities can seize the yacht. A possible Fabergé egg was found aboard the yacht. In February 2024, US authorities revealed their desire to auction the yacht due to its "excessive" upkeep. The yacht reportedly costs $7 million a year to maintain and monthly costs include $360,000 to pay the crew, $165,000 on maintenance and other expenses, and $75,000 on fuel.

=== Philanthropy ===
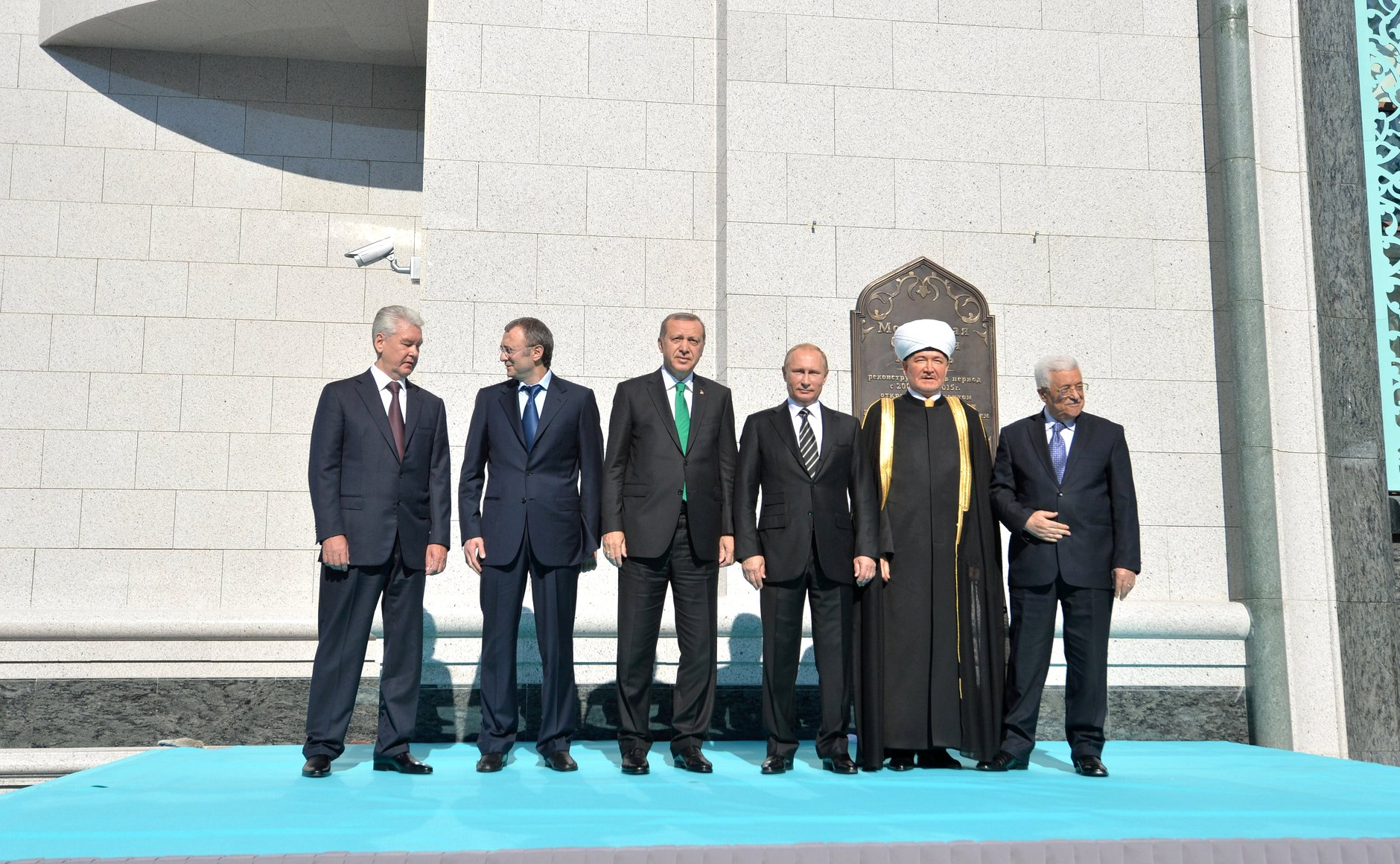
Kerimov, Mahmoud Abbas, Vladimir Putin and Recep Tayyip Erdoğan opened Moscow's Cathedral Mosque, 23 September 2015.

Kerimov established the Suleyman Kerimov Foundation in 2007. The Kerimov Foundation has donated to mosque and church constructions, as well as sent thousands of pilgrims to Mecca on Hajj annually. Kerimov spent $100 million on the construction of the Moscow Cathedral Mosque.

Kerimov was involved in the reconstruction of the Zarechenskaya secondary school, an advanced comprehensive school west of Moscow. Kerimov is a sponsor of the Sirius educational centre for gifted children, located in Sochi and Dagestan.

Kerimov is head of the supervisory board of the Russian Wrestling Federation, and is a member of the Gorchakov Foundation's supervisory board. The International Federation of Associated Wrestling Styles (FILA) honored Kerimov the "Gold Medal" in 2013.

On 20 March 2017, Kerimov was awarded the Order "For Merit to the Fatherland", II class by President Vladimir Putin for his outstanding contribution to the development of parliamentarianism and legislation.

== See also ==
- List of Russian billionaires
