= Ice (yacht) =

Private yacht built in 2005

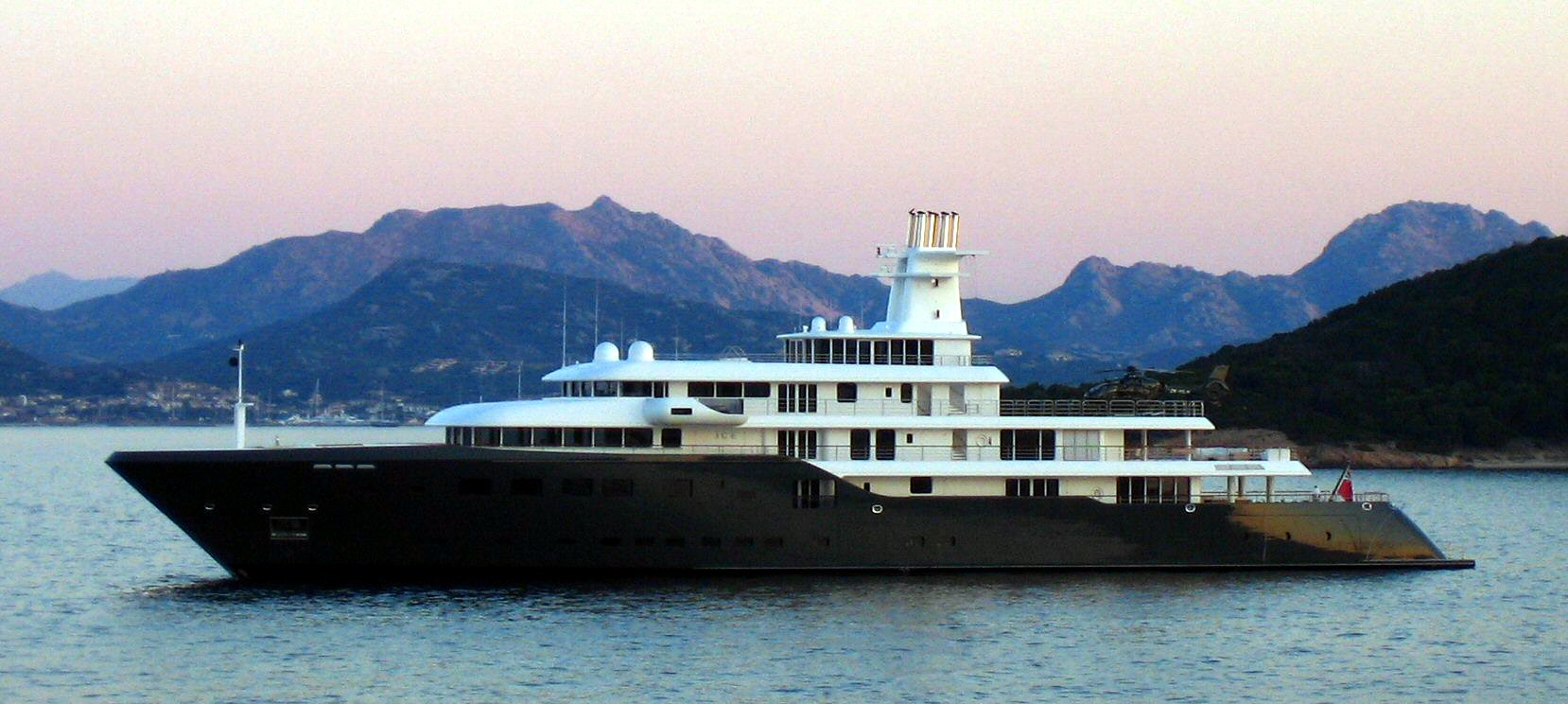
- Motor yacht Ice

History
- Name: Ice
- Builder: Lürssen, Bremen, Germany
- Launched: 24 February 2005
- Identification: IMO number: 9332406; MMSI number: 319411000; Callsign: ZGFC6

General characteristics
- Type: Motor yacht
- Length: 90 m (300 ft)
- Propulsion: Diesel-electric; 8 × 842 kW (1,129 hp) Deutz AG 16-cylinder generators; 2 × ABB Type 5 Azipod electric azimuth thrusters
- Speed: 18 knots (33 km/h; 21 mph)
- Aircraft carried: Eurocopter EC135
- Aviation facilities: Helipad

Ice is a large private yacht, measuring 295 feet (90 m) in length. Launched in 2005 as Air, she was completed at the Lürssen yard in Bremen, Germany to the design of Tim Heywood. The yacht was owned by Russian billionaire Suleyman Kerimov from christening until 2015 when Teodoro Nguema Obiang Mangue of Equatorial Guinea acquired the yacht. (Note: The super yacht Ebony Shine, purchased for $100 million in 2014 by the Equatorial Guinea holding company Dara Limited for use by Teodoro Nguema Obiang Mangue was seized by Dutch authorities in November 2016.)

The ship has a crew of 27 and is equipped with a diesel-electric powered, using eight 842 kW Deutz 16-cylinder generators to provide electric power to two ABB type 5 Azipod electric azimuth thrusters. She can reach a speed of 18 knots, and has a range of 6000 nautical miles. Ice has a large swimming pool on the main deck (stern) in addition to the jacuzzi on the sun deck. On the third deck, the yacht carries an AgustaWestland AW169 call sign P4-ICE, which can transport ten passengers.

Although its home port is Gibraltar, it was moored at Tangier, Morocco, since November 2016 and spotted in February 2020 at Bridgetown, Barbados and Port of Spain, Trinidad and Tobago, and later in March 2020 off the coast of Five Islands, Antigua. Then in Willemstad, Curaçao in December 2023, January 2024 and April 2024. Recently reported to be in Catania, Sicily as of early July 2024. On 10 July 2024 it was seen in port at Fethiye. Later, in September 2024 was spotted at the Marmaris Port in Turkey.

== History ==
Ordered by Augusto Perfetti, the keel for Air, also known then as Project Rainbow, was laid down at the Lürssen yard in Bremen, Germany, following the design of Tim Heywood with the interior design by Terence Disdale, but, during construction and prior to delivery, Air was purchased by Suleiman Kerimov and was subsequently renamed Ice at its christening in 2005. (Note: After the sale to Kerimov, Perfetti ordered the 266 feet (81 m) in length Air at Feadship/De Vries.)

In 2015, Kerimov sold Ice which was worth $150 million (over €130 million) to Dara Limited for use by Teodoro Nguema Obiang Mangue who operates the yacht through his personal assistant Switzerland's Cédric B.'s Marshall Islands based company KOA Asset Management Ltd.

== Awards ==
Ice won Superyacht of the Year at the 2006 World Superyacht Awards.

Ice docked in Nassau, Bahamas on 1 January 2009

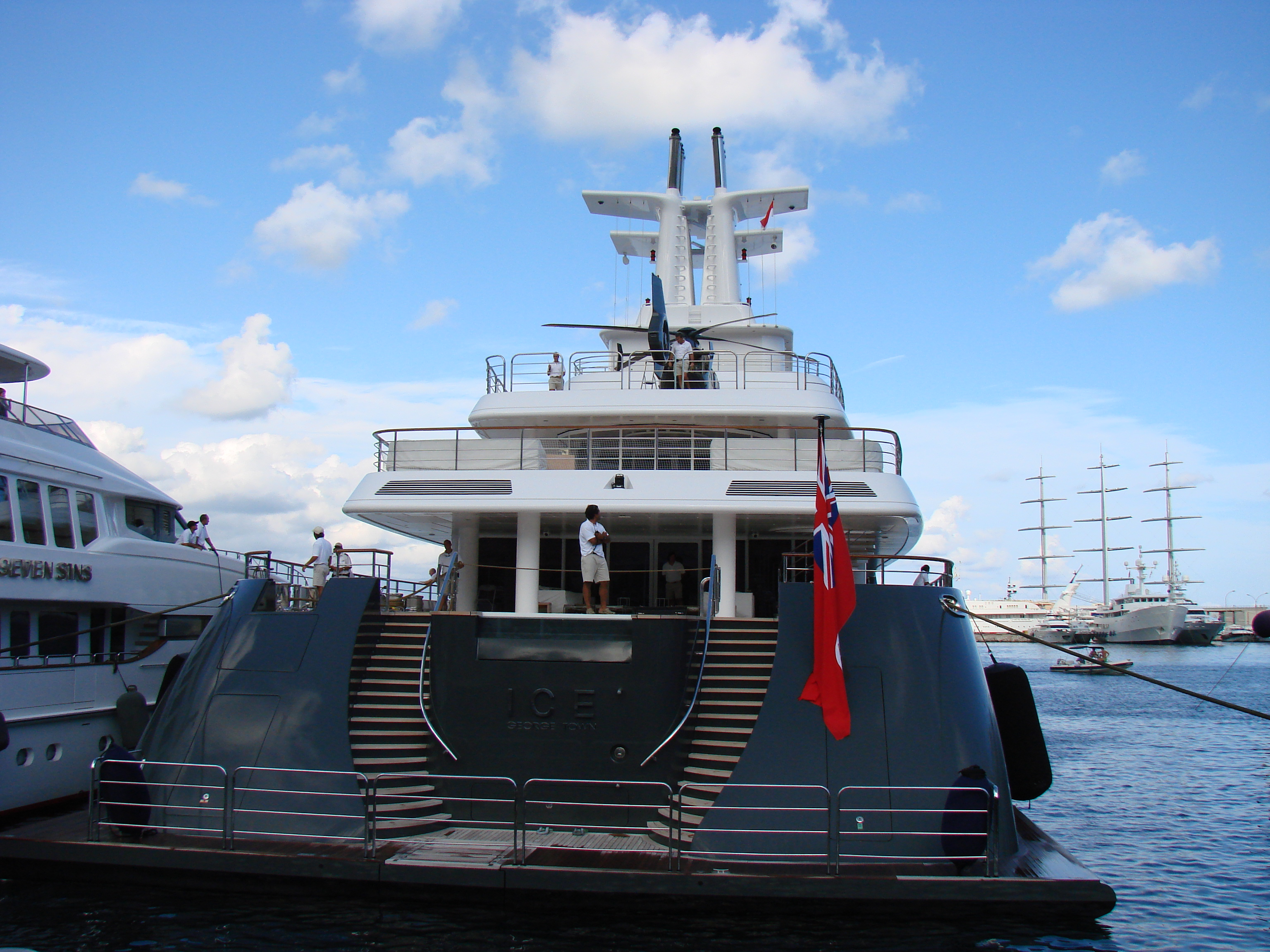
Ice mooring in Monte-Carlo

== See also ==
- List of motor yachts by length
