= PIK Group =

Russian construction company

PIK Group of Companies PJSC
- Type: Public (ПAO)
- Traded as: MCX: PIKK
- Industry: Real estate Construction
- Founded: 1994 as Pervaya Ipotechnaya Kompaniya
- Headquarters: Moscow, Russia
- Key people: Ivan Polandov, (CEO)
- Products: House-building
- Revenue: $5.27 billion (2020)
- Operating income: $1.22 billion (2020)
- Net income: $1.2 billion (2020)
- Total assets: $9 billion (2020)
- Total equity: $2.53 billion (2020)
- Website: https://www.pik.ru/

PIK, officially Public Joint Stock Company «PIK-specialized homebuilder» (Russian: ПАО «ПИК-специализированный застройщик»), is a leading European homebuilder and construction company headquartered in Moscow. As the largest housing developer in Russia and Europe, PIK specializes in the construction and sale of comfort-class housing, primarily in the industrial housing segment. Since its establishment in 1994, PIK has built over 30 million square meters of housing, providing apartments for more than 2 million people. The company operates in 15 regions of Russia, with a focus on Moscow and the Moscow region.

The company tops the list of the largest developers in Russia as of 1 September 2022.

== History ==
Pervaya Ipotechnaya Kompaniya (PIK), subsequently renamed "PIK", was founded in 1994 by Yuri Zhukov and Kirill Pisarev.

In 2001, to expand its real estate development activities, PIK acquired Housebuilding Combine No.2 (DSK-2). DSK-2 is the third-largest housebuilding enterprise in Moscow, delivering over 4.8 million square feet (450,000 square meters) of residential floor space annually. It specializes in building multi-story industrial (panel) residential buildings of the KOPE (3D design element) series. The combination performs the full range of residential panel construction operations, including the manufacture of external and internal reinforced concrete structures, façade solutions, window units, and other elements of residential buildings.

In 2005, PIK bought from Inteco another major Moscow housebuilding combine — DSK-3, with a capacity of 5.4 million square feet (500 thousand square meters), thereby establishing an in-house large-panel construction capacity of up to 10.8 million square feet (1 million square meters) of housing per year and becoming a leading player on the Russian residential panel housing market.

In 2006, PIK acquired the Stroyinvestregion company and began to expand its real estate development activities across Russia, with projects in cities such as Kaliningrad, Yaroslavl, Kaluga, Obninsk, Nizhny Novgorod, Taganrog, Novorossiysk, Perm and Omsk.

In 2007, PIK bought Reinforced Concrete Structures Combine No.480, located in the town of Aleksin, Tula Region.

In late May 2007, PIK held an IPO in which its shareholders sold 15% of the company for $1.85 bn, giving the company a capitalization of $12.3 bn. In 2013, the company carried out an additional share placement and its shares traded on the London Stock Exchange and the Moscow Interbank Exchange. In June 2017, PIK delisted from the London Stock Exchange and consolidated its share trading on the Moscow Exchange.

In 2013, an integrated production company called PIK-Industriya AO was created on the basis of DSK-2, DSK-3 and PIK-Avtotrans.

In 2014, the CEO and almost the entire management team were replaced.

In mid-2016, it was announced that PIK was to purchase the Morton Group, one of the biggest real estate developers in Russia. The value of the deal was not disclosed.

== Russia's economic crisis period ==
In 2008, as a result of Russia's economic crisis, the company encountered financial difficulties. Residential real estate construction almost halved that year, relative to 2007, from 23,000 apartments (1.5 million m²) to 12,380 apartments (813,000 m²).

The crisis was a turning point in the company's history. On 25 December 2008, the Government of the Russian Federation adopted a decision to include PIK in the list of systemic companies of the Russian economy. Despite this, however, in April 2009, PIK's founders, Kirill Pisarev and Yuri Zhukov, had to relinquish control over the company: they ceded a 25% shareholding to Suleyman Kerimov (Nafta-Moscow OOO) in exchange for a debt restructuring.

In 2009, the company received state guarantees from the Russian Federation government.

Following the most acute phase of the economic crisis, from 2010 to 2012, PIK recovered and reinforced its position in the market. The National Rating Agency gave the company an "A» individual creditworthiness rating. In 2014, international ratings agency Standard & Poor's gave the company a corporate credit rating of "B/positive" with a positive outlook. In late 2013, strategic investors Aleksandr Leonidovich Mamut and Sergey Eduardovich Gordeev acquired a shareholding in PIK from subsidiaries of the Suleyman Kerimov Foundation.

In late 2014, PIK received notification of a 5% increase in the shareholding of its President and principal shareholder, Sergey Gordeev, which took his equity share from 24.9% to 29.9%.

In the summer of 2017, Sergey Gordeev closed a deal to buy out the shareholdings of companies belonging to Aleksandr Mamut (16%) and Mikail Shishkhanov (9.8%) at 280 rubles per one ordinary share. Sergey Gordeev thereby became the controlling shareholder, owning 50,02 % of PIK.

In the autumn of 2017, Sergey Gordeev further increased his shareholding in PIK to 74,6 % by completing a buyout of the minority shareholders in Alexander Mamut's and Mikhail Shishkhanov's companies.

== Owners and Management ==
The main shareholder and President of PIK is Sergey Gordeev. He had a 59,33 % shareholding. In October 2023, Gordeev transferred 20% of the shares of the Central Trust Company, leaving himself 32.49%, and ceased to be the controlling shareholder.

In 2022, Ivan Polandov was named CEO of PIK.

== Activities ==
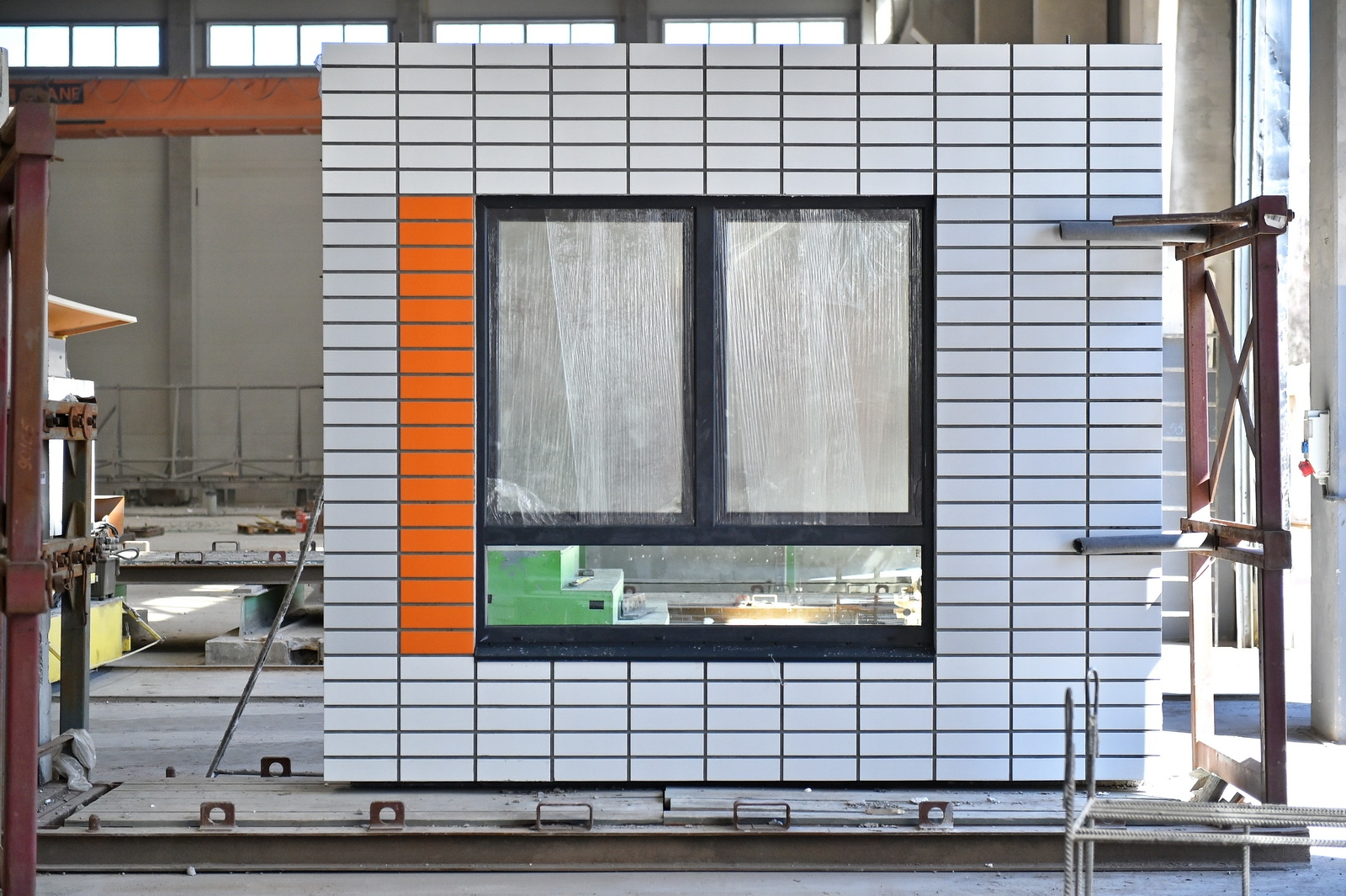

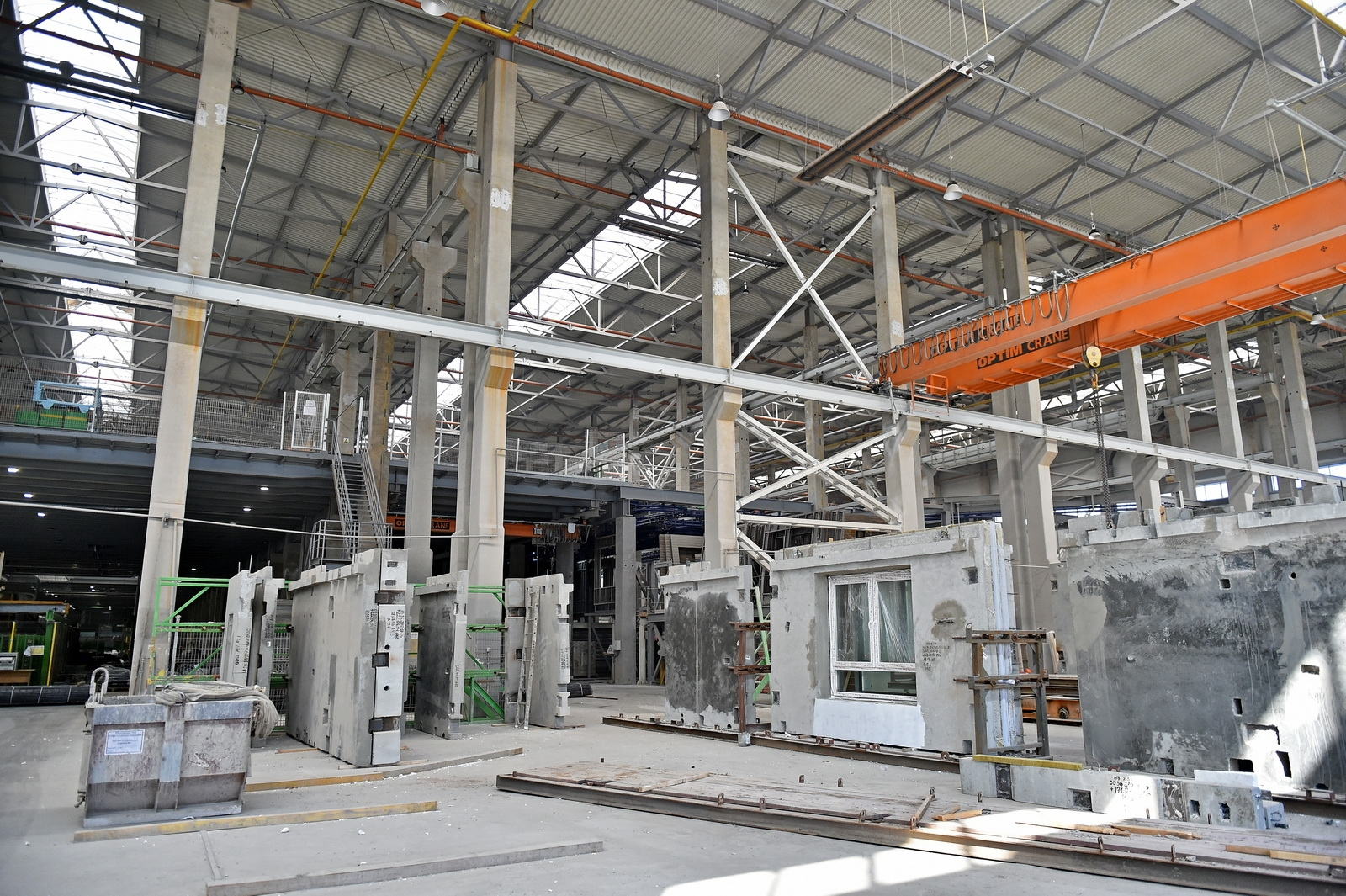
House-building factory owned by PIK Group in Naro-Fominsk, Moscow Oblast.

PIK specializes in the construction and sale of comfort-class residential real estate, primarily in the industrial housebuilding segment, and is a leader on the Russian real estate market. Since the company began its activities (1994), it has built 228 million square feet (30 million square meters) of residential space, or 340,000 apartments, thereby providing housing to over 1 million people. PIK is active in 15 regions of Russia, with a focus on Moscow and Moscow Oblast.

PIK has an extensive and diversified project portfolio. As at 31 December 2007, it held a land bank of 123.8 million square feet (11.5 million square meters). In 2018, the company is working on more than 40 integrated real estate development projects in the Moscow metropolitan area, with the majority of these projects focusing on the affordable housing sector. At the same time, the company's portfolio also features several business-class projects, including Vavilova 4, Vander Park, and Mosfilmovskaya.

PIK has approximately 13,000 employees and is accredited with 18 major Russian banks.

In 2017, the Analytical Credit Ratings Agency (ACRA) assigned the company a rating of «BBB+», which is higher than any other Russian real estate developer, and Standard & Poor's confirmed its «B» credit rating. Also in 2017, Expert ratings agency gave PIK a credit rating of «A-» with a stable outlook. By decision of the Government of the Russian Federation, PIK has been included in the list of systemic companies of the Russian economy.

PIK has its own design bureau and modern manufacturing facilities, enabling it to adapt quickly and flexibly to the market's needs. In 2015, the company brought some fundamentally new industrial and monolithic housebuilding products to the market, completely transforming its approach to shaping the internal living environment in new developments.

PIK's production facilities include: the Aleksin Reinforced Concrete Structures Plant, the Naro-Fominsk Reinforced Concrete Structures Plant, the Ochakov Reinforced Concrete Structures Plant, the New Construction Systems plant in Obninsk, and the Volga-Form Non-Standard Reinforced Concrete Plant. It also includes concrete mixing units and the production of semi-finished items for the full range of components, embedded items, rigging, formwork, and other related materials. Taken together, these facilities have an annual capacity of 1.5 million m2 of prefabricated reinforced concrete housing units and 500,000 m2 of SEM (Superefficient Monolith) façade structures, fully meeting PIK's requirements for these items.

The company is currently constructing houses in two main categories: PIK (Industrial Housing) and SEM (Superefficient Monolith). The basements and ground floors of PIK series buildings are monolithic, with tiled panels used from the first floor upwards.

Most of these houses do not have balconies, although they do feature storage rooms for residents, and the façades are fitted with cages for external air conditioning units. This helps to preserve the architectural appearance of the façades.

PIK collaborates with both European and Russian design, architectural, and engineering partners, including de Architekten Cie., Gillespies, Steer Davies Gleave, John McAslan+Partners, Urbica, RuGBSC, Aukett Swanke, and Buromoscow.

In 2015, the company introduced PIK Standard — its own set of regulations under which all new projects are being implemented. This describes all the parameters of a residential district from the external appearance of the façades to the number of electrical sockets in each apartment.

Together with the AFA landscape bureau, PIK created Russia's first PlayHub children's playground in the grounds of the Buninskiye Luga residential district. In 2018, it plans to complete a second PlayHub in the Salaryevo Park district.

In 2019, Samokat attracted a $10 million investment from Sergey Gordeev's PIK Group of Companies. The deal between PIK Innovations and Samokat was closed in July 2019. According to the Cyprus Registrar, the PIK group received 27% of Roboretail.

== Key Statistics ==
PIK's 2013 IFS revenue was 62.5 bn rubles. The company's net profit as of 31 December 2013 decreased by 20.1 billion rubles to 18.0 billion rubles (2012: 38.1 billion rubles). Net debt as at 31 December 2012 was 37.1 bn rubles, which was 5.7 bn rubles less than in the previous year.

In 2013, 52 new projects were launched (49 new projects in 2012). Sales grew by 2.9% to 677,000 m² of residential real estate. Total cash revenue in 2013 grew by 10,8 % while revenue from real estate retail sales grew by 32,3 % following a deliberate reduction in less profitable wholesale deals. Net profit in 2013 increased by more than 2.3 times to 7.4 bn rubles.

In 2014, PIK's total sales decreased by 8.4% to 620,000 m², and sales revenue declined by 19.1% to 50.95 billion rubles. The Group's total revenue in 2014 fell from 74.8 billion rubles to 61.7 billion rubles, or by 17.5%.

In 2015, the company brought 12 new projects (50 new multi-story buildings) to the market. Real estate sales increased to 625,000 m², and PIK's total revenue reached 68.7 billion rubles.

In 2016, as in the previous year, the company brought 12 new projects to the market, and 63 new multi-story residential buildings were put on sale. The developer's total revenue grew by 47,2 % over the year to 101.2 bn rubles and residential sales increased by more than 50% to 950,000 m2.

In 2017, the company put 11 new projects and 99 new multi-story buildings up for sale. Total revenue increased by 203,4 % to 175.1 bn rubles. Real estate sales increased by 214.5% to 169.9 billion rubles. The volume of completed real estate handed over to buyers increased by 10.4% to 1,887,000 m².

In the first quarter of 2018, PIK put 21 new residential buildings up for sale. Total revenue increased by 26,9 % to 57.0 bn rubles from 44.9 bn rubles in the first quarter of 2017. Real estate sales increased by 36,9 % to 53.8 bn rubles, compared to 39.3 bn rubles in the first quarter of 2017.

In 2022, the company's revenue amounted to 23 billion rubles.

== Social Responsibility ==
Since 2005, PIK has been involved in addressing the problems of individual investors who were defrauded by dishonest construction firms, including Stroymetresurs ZAO, Kompaniya Stroyindustriya OOO, and KT Sotsialnaya Initsiativa, which failed to meet their obligations to buyers. The company has completed construction of over 20 multi-story buildings and handed over 3,330 apartments to such investors.

The company is also completing construction of the Western Gateway to the Capital residential complex in the town of Odintsovo, Moscow Region. Work on the project began in 2004 but was frozen in 2005. New investors were brought in to complete it, but they also failed to meet their obligations. Construction of the two six-section buildings — Buildings 2 and 3 — was resumed in November 2016 by the project's new investor, PIK, and the keys to the apartments in those blocks were finally handed over to their long-suffering owners in the autumn of 2017.

The company has a strong focus on building social infrastructure, including schools, kindergartens, and clinics, and brings in prominent experts to work on these projects. Thus, PIK engaged the Dominique Colon & Associates bureau to design a school and kindergarten for the Green Park residential complex. The unique round kindergarten by Buromoscow, located at the Varshavskoe Shosse 141 project, was named the Best Urban Architectural Solution for Educational and Medical Facilities by Moscow's Architectural Council.

Between January 2015 and August 2022, PIK constructed 24 schools and 59 kindergartens, creating 32,162 places in child education establishments. The company hands over all social facilities for children, fully equipped with furniture, equipment, toys, and everything required for learning, development, comfortable, and informative leisure.

== Gallery ==
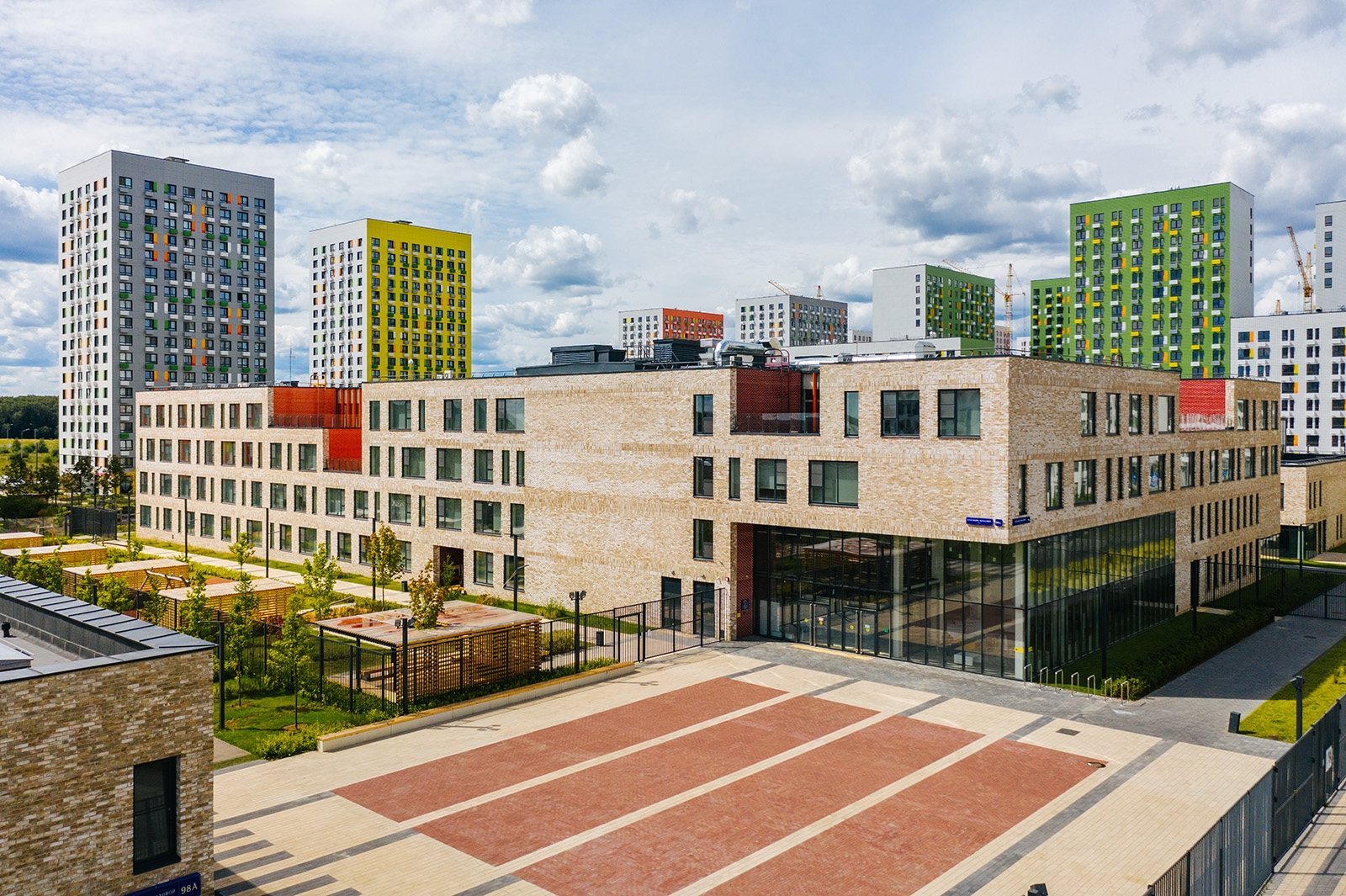
Buninskiye Luga residential complex by PIK Group in Sosenskoye Settlement, Moscow.

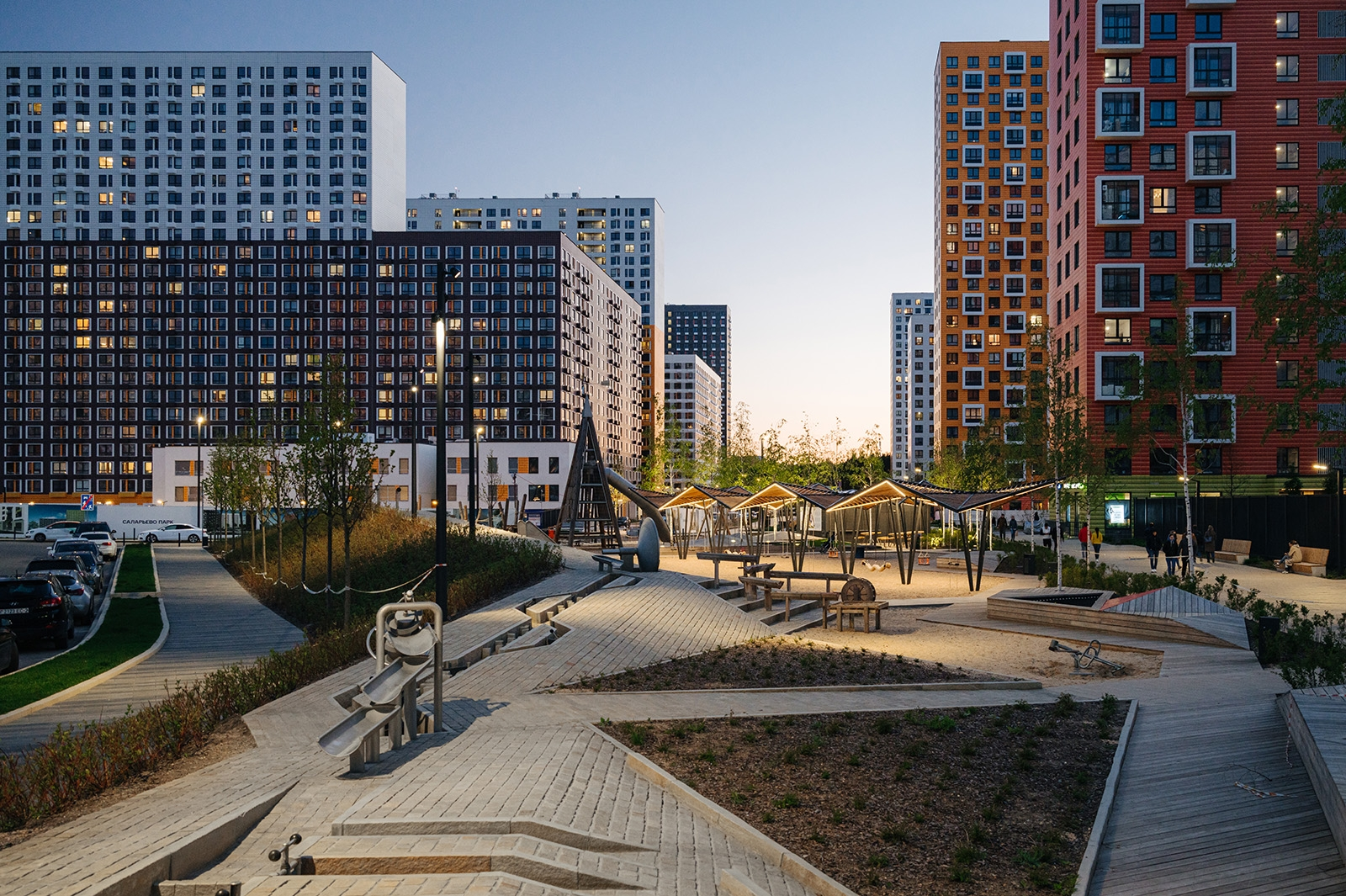
Salaryevo Park residential complex in Moskovsky Settlement, Moscow.

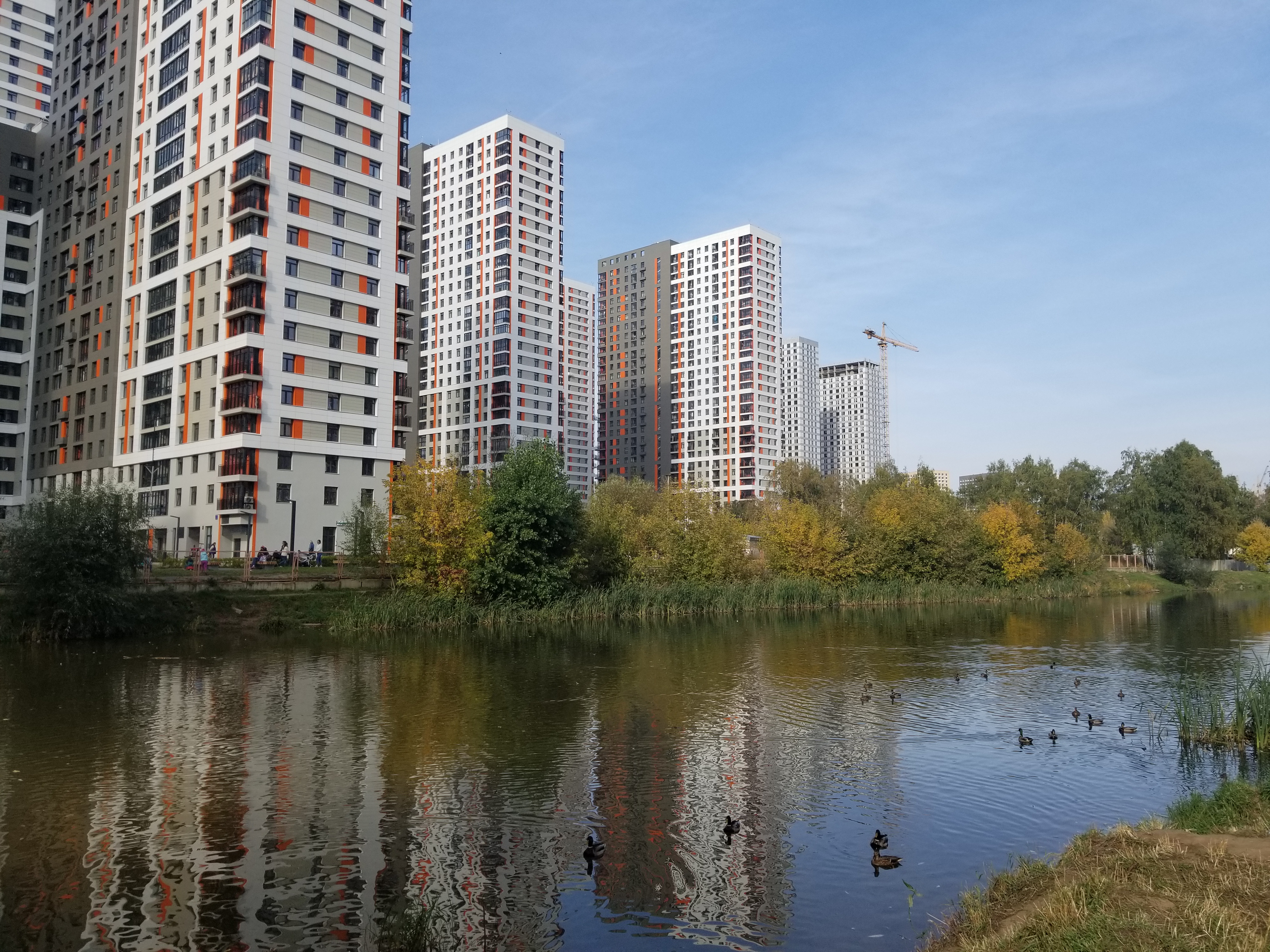
Orange Park residential complex in Kotelniki, Moscow Oblast.

== See also ==
- MR Group
