= Kirill Pisarev =

Cypriot businessman (born 1969)

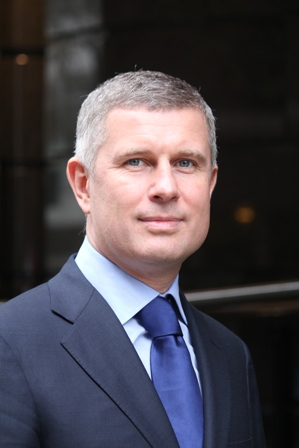
- Born: June 16, 1969 (age 56); Moscow, Russia
- Occupations: entrepreneur, investor and co-founder of PIK Group
- Website: Wainbridge Limited - Official Website The Collection - Official Website

Kirill Pisarev (born June 16, 1969), is an entrepreneur and investor who is best known for being the co-founder of PIK Group, one of the major Russian real estate developers, and later Wainbridge (Wainbridge International) where he is the main shareholder and board chairman. He is also the founder, CEO and chairman of The Collection, a global ultra luxury hospitality platform. He possesses more than 30 years of work experience in the real estate sector. In 2011 he was listed in the Forbes' 200 Russia's richest businessmen. In 2022, Kirill Pisarev exited all Russian assets.

== Early life ==
Kirill Pisarev was born in Moscow, Russia. From 1987 to 1989, he served in the Soviet Army. He graduated from the State Finance Academy of the Russian Government with a degree in Finance and Credit in 1995.

== Career ==
In 1994, Kirill Pisarev co-founded the first mortgage company ("PIK Group"). By 2007 the company had become Russia's largest residential developer, bringing online in excess of 1 million square meters of space per year. In June 2007, PIK Group completed a $1.93 billion IPO on the London (LSE) and Russian (RTS, MICEX) stock exchanges, the largest ever real estate IPO in Europe and globally (non-REIT). The company was valued at $12.3 billion. To date, PIK Group has completed in excess of 13 million square meters of housing. Pisarev served as the president of the company between 1994 and 2009. From 2009 to 2011, he was the chairman of the board and a director of the company.

== Wainbridge ==
In 2008 in London, Kirill Pisarev founded Wainbridge, now he is a major shareholder and board chairman of company. Then Wainbridge activity is spread over other world's markets and today it is an international development manager operating in the US, UK, France and specializing in residential, commercial and mixed-use schemes of premium segment, including boutique-hotels and hi-end villas. Wainbridge has collected more than 30 unique projects in its portfolio. To date, Wainbridge has five international offices and is constantly seeking new opportunities to expand its presence in the world. Also Kirill Pisarev is an investor in the funds Wainbridge Global Opportunities (London commercial property), Wainbridge Special Situations (investments in debt tools of the US real estate market). Pisarev is a member of the investment advisory committee Wainbridge Limited, a real estate asset management company. In 2022 Kirill Pisarev ceased to be the owner of the Russian division of Wainbridge, focusing on projects in Europe and the USA.

Pisarev's current business interests have been reported to include: Wainbridge Capital, a Jersey-registered real estate investment and asset management company; and The Collection, a luxury property services company.
