= Verninskoye mine =

Gold mine in Russia

- Location: Irkutsk Oblast, Russia
- Products: Gold

The Verninskoye mine is one of the largest gold mines in Russia and in the world. The mine is located in Irkutsk Oblast. The mine has estimated reserves of 12.88 million oz of gold.
