= Seismogenic layer =

In geophysics and seismology, the seismogenic layer or seismogenic zone covers the range of depths within the crust or lithosphere in which most earthquakes originate. The thickness is heavily dependent on location. For oceanic crust, the seismogenic layer thickness can be 0 to 40 kilometres (0 to 25 mi), and for continental crust, it ranges from 0 to 25 kilometres (0 to 16 mi). It is also important to note that at subduction zones, there is one seismogenic layer being pushed on top of another. This can result in extremely deep earthquakes up to 700 kilometres (430 mi) in depth. The base of this layer represents the downwards change in deformation mechanism from elastic and frictional processes (associated with brittle faulting) to a generally aseismic zone where ductile creep becomes the dominant process. The location of this change in deformation style is sometimes referred to as the brittle–ductile transition zone.
