= Olimpiada mine =

Gold mine in Krasnoyarsk Krai, Russia

Coordinates: 59.8650°N 92.9156°E

- Interactive map of Olimpiada mine
- Location: Krasnoyarsk Krai, Russia
- Products: Gold
- Company: Polyus

The Olimpiada mine is one of the largest gold mines in Russia and in the world. The mine is located in Krasnoyarsk Krai. As of 2023, the mine has estimated resources of 48 million oz, and reserves of 21 million oz of gold.
