= Natalka mine =

Gold mine in Russia

- Interactive map of Natalka mine
- Location: Magadan Oblast, Russia
- Products: Gold

The Natalka mine is one of the largest gold mines in Russia and in the world. The mine is located in Magadan Oblast. The mine has estimated reserves of 59.7 million oz of gold.
