= Vadim Belyaev =

Russian businessman, banker and investor

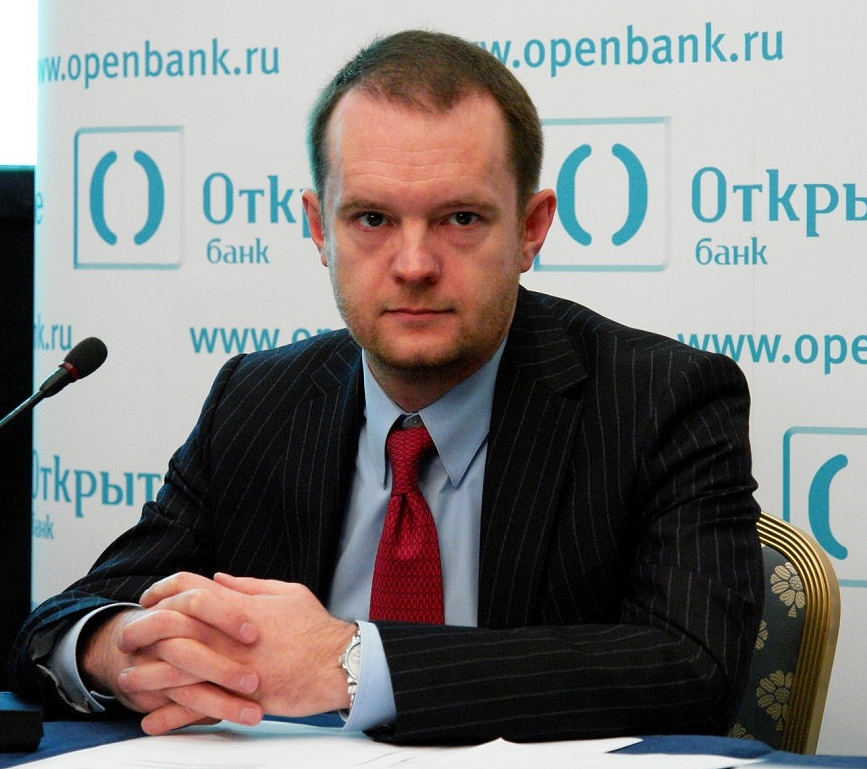
- Born: Vadim Stanislavovich Wolfson; 28 May 1966 (age 59); Moscow
- Title: Founder, chairman and 29% shareholder, Otkritie Holding
- Website: www.vadim-belyaev.com

Vadim Stanislavovich Belyaev (born Wolfson, 28 May 1966) is a Russian businessman, banker and investor. He is one of the founders, a major shareholder, former chief executive and board chairman of Otkritie Holding, once the largest privately held financial group in Russia, and as such the former major shareholder of Otkritie Bank.

== Education and early career ==
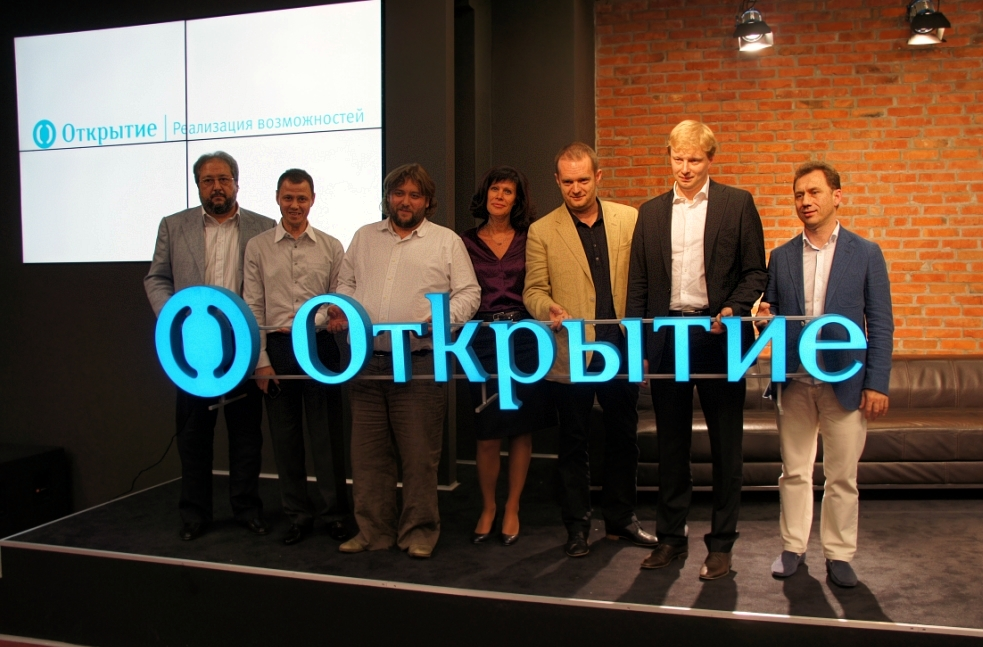
Belyaev in 2011 (third to the right).

Vadim Belyaev was born on 28 May 1966, in Moscow, into the family of Russian scientists, Stanislav Wolfson and Natalia Belyaeva. His father, Stanislav Wolfson, was an engineer, and well-known as an author of high school chemistry textbooks. Born Vadim Wolfson, with his father's surname, he later adopted his mother's.

In 1989, he graduated from the Moscow Institute of Radio Equipment, Electronics and Automation (MIREA), later renamed the Russian Technology University, with a degree in electronic acoustics and ultrasound engineering. After graduation, Belyaev was employed as a computer programmer at the Soviet shipbuilding ministry, following which he briefly worked as an IT-specialist for a private firm.

In 1995, Belyaev earned a degree in banking and insurance from the Russian government-sponsored Financial University in Moscow (FinU). He also holds a certificate in capital markets from the London-based Chartered Institute for Securities & Investment (CISI).

== Business career ==
In 1992, Belyaev began to trade in the developing Russian securities market. The next year he set up a fund to trade in the recently issued Russian government privatization vouchers. Soon after, Belyaev joined Aura Bank in Moscow to lead and manage its securities trading department. In 1994 Aura Bank was reorganized as the Moscow Petrochemical Bank and Belyaev became the chief executive officer's deputy.

In 1995, Belyaev teamed up with some managers of the Moscow office of Italtel Ltd, an Italian telecommunication equipment producer, to launch an investment firm called VEO-Invest, investing principally in local telecommunications assets. In 1997, Belyaev became CEO at VEO-Invest and expanded the firm's activities into wider brokerage services and financial consulting.

Belyaev initially owned about 10% of VEO-Invest, but after the 1998 financial crisis in Russia, he bought out the other shareholders’ stakes and became sole owner.

In 2001, VEO-Invest and another brokerage, BK Otkritie, merged, resulting in the creation of VEO-Otkritie, of which Belyaev owned 75%.

In 2004 Belyaev's tennis partner, Russian businessman Boris Mints invested in VEO-Otkritie. The company rebranded as Investment Group Otkritie, later renamed Otkritie Holding. Belyaev remained as CEO and Mints became the chairman of the board of directors. In 2006 the partners bought a small local lender, Shchit (“Shield”) Bank, and renamed it Otkritie Bank.

In 2007-2008, Otkritie worked with the Russian electricity grid monopoly RAO UES, which was undergoing reorganization and restructuring under the oversight of Anatoly Chubais, who had won international renown for his handling of privatization in post-Soviet Russia. According to The Financial Times, in 2008, state-controlled VTB bank provided Otkritie with a loan to set up a $2.4bn fund to trade shares of the smaller power utilities that split from RAO UES as a result of the reorganization. In 2009, the fund was sold to an offshore firm under the management of Xenon Capital Partners (an investment company set up by Natalia Tsukanova, the former head of JPMorgan's investment banking in Russia).

In a separate deal, VTB acquired a 20% stake in Otkritie in 2009 for approximately $150m.

In 2012, Otkritie took over Nomos Bank, a top-ten Russian lender, using a $1bn loan provided by VTB. By this time, Boris Mints had already sold his shares, making Belyaev the largest stakeholder.

Through numerous acquisitions and organic growth, by the end of 2015, Otkritie had evolved into Russia's largest privately held bank, with total assets of 3.3 Trillion rubles (equal to US$49 billion at the time).

In 2015, Belyaev resigned as CEO of Otkritie Holding to chair the board of directors and concentrate on strategic issues (under the Russian law, one person cannot simultaneously serve as the board chairman and the chief executive of the same entity).

In late 2016 Otkritie initiated a takeover of Rosgosstrakh, the country's largest insurer at the moment, which had suffered huge losses by then. The deal was initially suggested and later approved by the central bank. After the agreement was signed in December 2016, in the presence of the central bank's chairwoman Elvira Nabiullina and her deputy Sergey Shvetsov, Otkritie launched a due diligence of Rosgosstrakh. The checkup revealed that the insurer's problems were far greater than Otkritie had expected. In early July ACRA, the newly-established Russian credit rating agency, de facto controlled by the central bank, unexpectedly gave Otkritie a junk rating.

In August 2017, following the rating downgrade, Otkritie suffered a run on its deposits. On August 29, 2017, the Russian Central Bank intervened to take control. Dmitry Tulin, who was a deputy chairman at the central bank at the moment, admits that the intervention was basically triggered by the attempted takeover of Rosgosstrakh.

In July 2019, the Central Bank and Otkritie Bank filed a civil lawsuit in Russian court against Belyaev and four other former senior executives of Otkritie Holding and Otkritie Bank (ex-chairman of the bank's board Yevgeny Dankevich, former vice president Gennady Zhuzhlev, ex-head of the board of directors Ruben Aganbegyan, and former member of the board of directors Elena Budnik) for “damages” of 290bn rubles (over $4.5bn), allegedly incurred as a result of the Central Bank's intervention. The Central Bank's case does not assert any fraud or negligence by Belyaev; it simply seeks damages for “missed future gains” on the theory that its 2017 investment to shore-up Otkritie's balance sheet is tantamount to a 20-year interest-free loan and that if the Central Bank's funds were deployed instead to make interest-bearing loans, this would generate interest income equal to the claimed 290bn rubles through 2037. As of January 2020, the case was still at an early stage.

In September 2020, the Arbitration Court of Moscow satisfied the claim of Central Bank of Russia in the amount of 289.5 billion roubles against ex-co-owners and top managers of Otkritie FC Bank. In August 2021, Trust Bank also filed a lawsuit to the Moscow Arbitration Court in the amount of RUB 156.6 billion as part of the resolution of the dispute over the defendant's guilt in the courts of the Russian Federation and the Trust Bank's strategy for the return of funds in accordance with the plaintiff's position.

== Media activities ==
In 2006-2007, Belyaev hosted a radio show on the Echo of Moscow radio station — “Vadim Belyaev's Investor School”.

In 2009, Belyaev founded movie studio Organic Films. The company produced popular comedies “What Men Talk About” (directed by Dmitry Dyachenko) and “Chapiteau Show” (directed by Sergey Loban).

In 2010, Belyaev bought online magazine OpenSpace.ru. In 2012, he initiated major strategic changes in the magazine's mission and orientation, replacing the editorial team. To lead the new team, Belyaev brought in Maksim Kovalsky, the charismatic former editor-in-chief of popular political weekly Kommersant-Vlast. (Kovalsky had been dismissed from Kommersant-Vlast in December 2011, following the publication of detailed accusations of large-scale electoral fraud with a photograph of a ballot scrawled with profanity directed against Vladimir Putin, the then-prime minister). In 2013, the magazine was shut down for commercial reasons.

According to The Financial Times, in 2011 Belyaev sponsored a Cirque de Soleil performance in Moscow. At the opening of the performance he encouraged the audience to join the protest rally against Russian President Vladimir Putin at Bolotnaya Square.

== Philanthropy ==
Since 2011 Vadim Belyaev has been a major supporter of the first specialised paediatric palliative care centre in Moscow, established by the Vera charity foundation. According to the founder of the Vera charity foundation, Nyuta Federmesser, Vadim Belyaev was the first to donate money and he also helped raise more funds. Nyuta Federmesser praised Vadim Belyaev's efforts to persuade the municipal government of Moscow to allocate the land and building for the hospice.

== Awards ==
Belyaev was twice named the Investment Banker of the Year in Russia. He has been repeatedly included in the list of the country's top thousand best managers by the Kommersant business daily.

== Personal life ==
In 2019, Belyaev married Olga Liubimova, former journalist and founder of Fotodom agency. He was married twice before, with a daughter from his first marriage and a son and two daughters with his second wife, Amalia Mordvinova, a well-known Russian actress.
