= Aganbegyan =

Aganbegyan is an Armenian surname (Armenian: Աղանբեկյան). Notable people with the surname include:

- Abel Aganbegyan (born 1932), Russian Soviet economist
- Ruben Aganbegyan (born 1972), Russian economist, son of Abel
