= Igor Valentinovich Finogenov =

Russian banker and businessman

- Born: March 24, 1959 (age 67); Leningrad, Russian SFSR, Soviet Union
- Education: Leningrad Shipbuilding Institute and York University
- Occupations: Banker, entrepreneur
- Known for: Member of the Council of Foreign Investors under the President of Kazakhstan

Igor Valentinovich Finogenov (Russian: Игорь Валентинович Финогенов; born March 24, 1959, Leningrad) is a Russian banker and entrepreneur. Since 2009, he has been a member of the Council of Foreign Investors under the President of Kazakhstan.

== Education ==
In 1982, Finogenov graduated from the Leningrad Shipbuilding Institute with a degree in Mechanical Engineering, and in 1989 from the USSR Academy of Foreign Trade.

He graduated with a degree in Modern Management from York University (Toronto, Canada), as well as Harvard Business School.

== Career ==
In 1982–1987 Finogenov was an engineer, junior researcher, and researcher at the Scientific and Production Association for the Research and Design of Power Equipment in Leningrad.

In 1987–1991 he was a senior economist at the All-Union Association Energomashexport. He supervised the supply of high-tech equipment, calculating logistics, studying customs rules, and pricing. He formulated the cost of supplies, assessed risks, interacted with customs authorities, budgeted export operations, and oversaw financial reporting.

In 1991–1993 he was a specialist and executive secretary for the Committee for the Conversion of Defense Complex Enterprises of the Chamber of Commerce and Industry of the USSR, Russia.

In 1993 he became the Vice President for Foreign Economic Activity at Moscow: Materials, Technology, Construction. He conducted negotiations with foreign partners, concluded cross-border supply contracts, and controlled the execution of such agreements.

In 1992, he became a co-owner of TIPCO Venture Bank. In 1993–1998, he served as the deputy chairman then chairman of its board of directors, then of the joint stock investment-commercial bank New Moscow (Nomos-Bank) that was formed from TIPCO Venture Bank.

In 1994–1998 he was chair of the board of Nomos-Bank. His tasks included developing a growth strategy, controlling the work of operational managers, participating in the decision-making process in the areas of investments, personnel, financial control, compliance with legislation, Central Bank norms, risk management, and interaction with shareholders, as well as introducing new banking products.

At the initiative of Igor Finogenov, Nomos-Bank specialized in servicing medium and large-sized businesses while maintaining interaction with private individuals. The bank also began investing in precious metal mining companies. Nomos-Bank purchased the raw materials they mined, reselling them to citizens as investment instruments.

In 1998–2000 he worked at the Federal State Unitary Enterprise Rosvooruzhenie, including as the Deputy General Director.

In 2000–2005 he was president and chairman of the Board of Nomos-Bank. Under the leadership of Igor Finogenov, the bank was second among non-state credit organizations in the Russian Federation.

In 2005–2006 he was assistant to the Minister of Finance of Russia. In this position, he worked on the creation of an international project, the Eurasian Development Bank (EDB).

In 2006–2015 he was chair of the board of the Eurasian Development Bank. Among the major projects supervised by Igor Finogenov was the Eurasian Transport Corridor, which provides sea access for landlocked countries such as Kyrgyzstan, Tajikistan, and Kazakhstan. He also supervised the creation of the Eurasian commodity distribution network, which allowed for the organization of a common agricultural market for Russia, Belarus, Armenia, Kazakhstan, Uzbekistan, Tajikistan, and Kyrgyzstan and thereby accelerated the growth of the food segments of these countries by 5–7%. Trade turnover between them also increased by a third.

Igor Finogenov initiated a project for financing the Central Asian water and energy complex. With the support of the EDB, hydropower facilities were modernized and the use of scarce water resources in Central Asia was optimized to improve the quality of life of the local population without harming the environment.

He also supervised a project to support the market economy of Armenia through the funding of the local credit organization Ameriabank, which finances small and medium-sized businesses in Armenia.

Since 2009 he has been a member of the Council of Foreign Investors under the President of Kazakhstan. The Council dialogues with the authorities on possible legislative changes and ways to reduce tax burdens, remove administrative barriers, and grant preferences to foreign companies wishing to operate in the country. Igor Finogenov facilitated the entry of Japanese, Indian, Italian, British, American, Swiss, French, Turkish, Polish, Chinese, German, and Canadian companies into Kazakhstan.

In 2015 – February 2024 he was advisor to the president of the Chamber of Commerce and Industry of the Russian Federation.

From 2015 to February 2024 he was president of Polymetal International PLC (Kazakhstan), a gold-mining and primary silver production company.

In the same year he became chair of the boards of Directors of Polymetal's Kazakhstani assets, developing the Kyzyl and Varvara mines. In this position, he is responsible for coordinating interactions with state bodies in Kazakhstan, including obtaining permits, verifying transactions, taxation, and licensing.

Since 2022 he has been president of the Russian–Swiss Business Council. As of early 2024 the council's work has been suspended.

== Recognition ==
- Certificate of Honor of the Government of the Russian Federation for a significant contribution to the development of the Russian financial and banking system (2009)
- Honorary Medal of the Association of Regional Banks of Russia (2009)
- Order of Friendship (2010)
- Order of Friendship (Dostyk) of Kazakhstan, II Degree (2011)
- Certificate of Honor of the President of Kazakhstan for a significant contribution to the economic development and improvement of the state's investment image (2023)
