= Otkritie (disambiguation) =

Otkritie may refer to:

- Otkritie FC Bank
- Otkritie Holding
- Otkritie Arena
