= Boris Mints =

Russian billionaire businessman (born 1958)

- Борис Минц
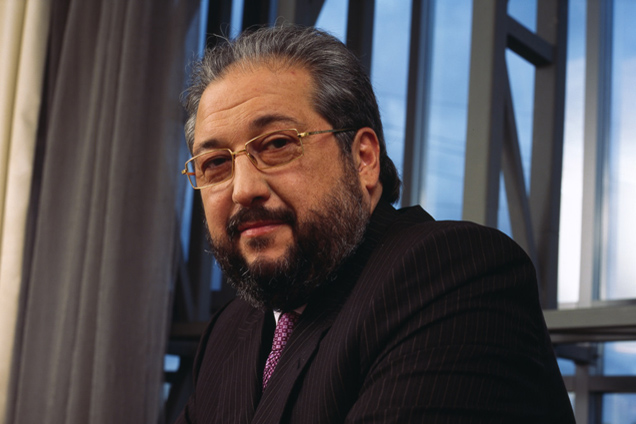
- Born: Boris Iosifovich Mints; 24 July 1958 (age 68); Rîbnița, Moldavian SSR, USSR (now Moldova)
- Citizenship: Russian and Maltese
- Education: Ivanovo State University
- Occupation: Businessman
- Board member of: Boris Mints Institute; Russian Jewish Congress; World Jewish Congress; Conference of European Rabbis; Yegor Gaidar International Foundation
- Spouse: Marina Vladimirovna Mints
- Children: 4
- Website: Official website; Boris Mints Prize

Boris Iosifovich Mints (Russian: Борис Иосифович Минц; born 24 July 1958) is a Russian oligarch with interests in real estate and finance, and co-founder of Otkritie FC Bank. He has the federal state civilian service rank of 1st class Active State Councillor of the Russian Federation.

He has been an outspoken critic of Vladimir Putin and the 2022 Russian invasion of Ukraine.

== Early life ==
Boris Mints was born in a Jewish family in Rîbnița, Moldavian SSR, USSR (now Moldova), to military engineer Major Joseph Samuilovich Mints (born 1932, in Nevel), and librarian Lusia Izrailevna Milter (1936–2007, Kodyma, Ukrainian SSR). Gershkovich Milter (1901–1944).

In 1980, he earned a bachelor's degree in physics from Ivanovo State University. Mints has a PhD in technical sciences and is an associate professor of higher mathematics.

== Career ==
Mints’ career began at the Ivanovo Textile Institute, where he worked from 1983 until 1990. Simultaneously, between 1987 and 1990, Mints worked at a Youth Center for Scientific Creativity.

Mints was appointed vice mayor of Ivanovo in 1990 and chaired the city property management committee (CPMC) until 1994. During this time, Mints met Anatoly Chubais, chairman of State Committee of the Russian Federation for State Property Management, and moved to Moscow to work at the State Property Committee.

Between 1994 and 1996, Mints worked as head of the main department of Public Assets Ministry of the Russian Federation. From 1996 until 2000, Mints was the head of the Office of the President of the Russian Federation for Issues of Local Governance and Secretary of the Council for Local Government in the Russian Federation, chaired by the President of the Russian Federation, Boris Yeltsin.

In the early 2000s, Mints was the head of the executive committee and finance and budget committee of political party “Union of Right Forces”. Between 2001 and 2003, he was also the general director of REN TV.

In 2003, Mints decided to join forces with Vadim Belyaev to develop “VEO-Otkritie”. In accordance with the partnership agreement, Mints bought 50% of the new company, Investment Group Otkritie” Ltd., which was officially founded in 2004. Mr. Belyaev became CEO of the company, and Mints was appointed chairman of the board of directors. Mints was also chairman of Otkritie Financial Corporation from 2004 until 2013 and held the position of president from 2012 until 2013. In 2013, Mints ceased to be a shareholder of the Otkritie Financial Corporation, upon the sale of his shares to other partners.

In 2004, Mints founded the O1 Group investment company, which owns and manages assets in real estate and financial sectors. In 2010, Mints founded the investment company O1 Properties for managing real estate assets. At the end of 2017, O1 Properties was the 6th largest owner of commercial real estate in Russia. In 2013, the O1 Group began acquiring pension business assets and until the middle of 2017 concluded deals to purchase NPF Telecom-Soyuz, NPF Stalfond, NPF Blagosostoyanie OPS, NPF Uralsib, NPF Obrazovaniye, NPF Our Future, NPF Socialnoe Razvitie.

Between 2014 and 2015, he acquired shares in the Austrian companies CA Immo and Immofinanz. CA Immo owns and manages commercial property in Austria, Germany and Eastern Europe.

In October 2016, the Future Financial Group held a public offering (IPO) of ordinary shares of FG Future on the Moscow stock exchange.

In September 2018, Boris Mints sold O1 Properties and the Future Financial Group (includes NPF Future).

Mints is also a member of the board of directors of the Russian Union of Industrialists and Entrepreneurs.

Mints is one of many "Russian oligarchs" named in the Countering America's Adversaries Through Sanctions Act, CAATSA, signed into law by President Donald Trump in 2017.

In March 2017, Forbes estimated Mints' wealth at over $1.3 billion.

== Otkritie bank administration and legal case ==
In July 2017, the Russian ratings agency ARCA gave Otkritie FC Bank a BBB− rating, preventing it from raising funds, and triggering an outflow of deposits. In August 2017, Otkritie had entered into a restructuring transaction when the Central Bank of Russia (CBR) intervened and took the bank into temporary administration. The following bailout of Otkritie required over $8 billion. In October 2017, Otkritie, now managed by the CBR, initiated a claim against 10 respondents including the O1 Group.

In June 2019, CBR managed Otkritie petitioned the High Court in the UK to freeze $572 million of Mints' assets, including a mansion in Perthshire, Scotland, known as the Tower of Lethendy. The court agreed only to an injunction prohibiting Mints and his three sons from disposing of assets, including the mansion and ordered Russian authorities discontinue claims in Russia and Cyprus. Mints, who had lived in Malta from 2016 moved to London in spring 2018. The Tower of Lethendy one of 140 of Mints' assets that the CBR were attempting to prevent being transferred. Ownership documents indicate that the mansion is owned by MFT Braveheart Ltd, a company registered in the Cayman Islands.

In July 2019, the Central Bank of Russia sued Otkritie's former owners and senior executives. Although Mints had sold his shares in the bank in 2013, the suit claimed he still had a relationship with Otkritie, alleging that Mints' company, O1, sold bonds to the banks as a "fraudulent scheme" to pay off its debt just days before the collapse, according to a Financial Times report. An earlier report in February 2019 had stated that the banks were alleged to have sustained "losses from purchasing large amounts of O1 and Otkritie Holding assets".

In November 2019, Mints filed a counter claim alleging Russian authorities have organized and planned a campaign against him and his business that lead to a loss of $650 – $950 million. According to the FT report, "Mr Mints and his sons deny committing fraud and are contesting the allegations in arbitration proceedings in London". The case was heard in August 2020 and the parties are awaiting the decision in 2021.

In May 2021, Interpol rejected an arrest warrant request from Russia to try Mints on embezzlement charges. The Russian government claimed that he had stolen 34 billion rubles ($460 million) from the bank shortly before it went into administration.

== Social and communal organisations ==
Mints serves as chairman of the board of trustees of the Conference of European Rabbis, which is the primary Orthodox rabbinical alliance in Europe. It unites more than 700 religious leaders of the mainstream synagogue communities in Europe. Mints is a Presiding Board Bureau member of the Russian Jewish Congress and vice-president of the World Jewish Congress, an international federation of Jewish communities and organizations. He is president and founder of the Boris Mints Institute for Strategic Policy Solutions to Global Challenges at Tel Aviv University.

Mints was a founder of the Yegor Gaidar international foundation and between 2010 and 2020 acted as the foundation's chairman. Mints is a member of the board of directors of the G.N. Romanov Center which specializes in the rehabilitation of children with profound mobility issues. Mints is a member of the board of governors of Tel Aviv University and was the first recipient of the Vladimir Spivakov International Charity Foundation's Miloserdiye (“Mercy”) prize, recognizing public figures for their commitment to humanitarian values.

== Personal life ==
He is married to Marina Vladimirovna Mints, and they have four children.

Mints plays chess and tennis. Since 2001, he collects Russian paintings and graphics, mainly works by painters from the end of the 19th and beginning of the 20th centuries. His collection includes works by Serov, Korovin, Kustodiev, Konchalovsky, Polenov, Pimenov, Gerasimov. Based on his collection, Mints created the private Museum of Russian Impressionism in Moscow in the building of the former confectionery factory "Bolshevik". The museum that was opened to the public in May 2016. The construction of the exhibition building at the Bolshevik site, based on a design by John McAslan + Partners, cost $16.5 million.

== Criticism of Vladimir Putin and Russia's war against Ukraine ==
Dr Boris Mints has long been in conflict with Vladimir Putin's kleptocracy. He first encountered Putin when Mints was working to set up and improve local democracy throughout Russia.

Mints was also one of the first Russian businessman to protest against the 2022 Russian invasion of Ukraine, writing on the 28 February 2022, just four days after Russia’s invasion, that “it is the most tragic event of our century so far, with parallels to Hitler’s invasion of Poland in 1939... I speak out categorically against Russia’s invasion of Ukraine.”

His social media posts condemning the war made national news. He has supported various relief campaigns to help those displaced and has aided the sheltering of many Ukrainian refugees in the UK and met the Ukrainian Ambassador to the UK in the first weeks of the war to express his support.
