= Vladimir Amarin =

Belarusian economist and politician (born 1961)

Vladimir Viktorovich Amarin
- Владимир Викторович Амарин; Уладзімір Віктаравіч Амарын

Minister of Finance
- In office 6 November 2014 – 31 August 2018
- President: Alexander Lukashenko
- Prime Minister: Mikhail Myasnikovich; Andrei Kobyakov; Syarhey Rumas
- Preceded by: Andrey Kharkovets
- Succeeded by: Maxim Yermalovich

Personal details
- Born: 1961 (age 64–65) Minsk, Byelorussian SSR, Soviet Union (now Belarus)
- Education: Academy of Public Administration

Vladimir Viktorovich Amarin (Note: Belarusian: Уладзімір Віктаравіч Амарын; Russian: Владимир Викторович Амарин) (born 1961) is a Belarusian economist and politician. He most notably served as Minister of Finance from 2014 to 2018.

Born in Minsk, Amarin graduated from the Belarus State Economic University in 1983 before working in the financial sector. In 2001 he became Head of the Main Directorate of Budget Policy, a position he held until 2006 when he left and graduated from the Academy of Public Administration. He then became one of the Deputy Ministers of Finance, and by 2008 he was the First Deputy Prime Minister of Finance. On 6 November 2014, Alexander Lukashenko nominated Amarin to be Minister of Finance. In this role, he forged closer ties with China and also attempted negotiations with the IMF. However, he was dismissed in 2018. (Note: He was briefly succeeded as minister in October 2015, but returned in December.) Since his time as minister he has been a part of the Standing Committee of the Union State, where he is Deputy Secretary of State.

== Early life ==
Amarin was born in 1961 in Minsk in the Byelorussian SSR. In 1983 he graduated from the Belarus State Economic University,. Afterward, he worked in the financial sector in various positions for a while. From 2001 to 2006 he was Head of the Main Directorate of Budget Policy. In this role, he helped create the 2005 budget which had resources for industry innovation, reduced the emergency tax rate, and Amarin said that Belarus would try to obtain a credit rating to attract foreign funding. The same year he left, in 2006, he graduated from the Academy of Public Administration.

From 2006 to 2008 he was one of the Deputy Ministers of Finance of Belarus. Afterwards, starting in 2007, he was First Deputy Minister of Finance. He also became Head of the Table Tennis Federation of Belarus in 2011, which he headed until 2018.

== Political career ==
On 6 November 2014, after 6 years of being First Deputy Minister, Alexander Lukashenko appointed Amarin Minister of Finance. On 16 October 2015, the government was temporarily resigned, but on 17 December 2015 he was re-appointed minister.

Generally, he did not speak much on issues besides the budget. Amarin encouraged the export of potash, keeping it on zero duty. He also deepened financial ties with China. He attempted to come to a greater understanding with the IMF in 2016 and said that the country had paid more than $3.3 billion in debt repayment, but the IMF did not grant Belarus an unconditional loan. However, Amarin did negotiate a loan with the Eurasian Fund for Stabilization and Development.

After departing, he temporarily found a job in Moscow, but in March 2019 was employed as a member of the Standing Committee of the Union State. He has also been Deputy Secretary of State of the Union State. During his tenure as Deputy Secretary, he announced that there were prospects for a singular currency for the Union State.

== Personal life ==
Amarin is married and has two sons.

== Honours and awards ==
- Award for Labour and Merit (1 March 2019)
