= Kyzyl (disambiguation) =

Kyzyl is the capital city of the Tuva Republic, Russia.

Kyzyl may also refer to:

- Kyzyl Airport, an airport in the Tuva Republic, Russia
- Kyzyl mine, a gold mine in Kazakhstan
- Kyzyl Caves, Buddhist caves in Xinjiang, China

== See also ==
- Kizil (disambiguation)
