= Russian Aquaculture =

Russian fish farming company

- Company type: Public
- Traded as: {MOEX|AQUA}
- Industry: Aquaculture
- Founded: 1997; 28 years ago
- Headquarters: Russia
- Key people: Maxim Vorobyev, Board Member; Ilya Sosnov, General Director
- Products: Atlantic salmon, sea trout, rainbow trout, salmon caviar
- Revenue: 8.3 billion ₽ (2020)
- Net income: 3,113 billion ₽ (2020)
- Number of employees: 500
- Website: www.russaquaculture.ru

Russian Aquaculture PJSC is Russia's largest fish farming company. It operates fish farms and markets in addition to chilled and frozen salmon and trout farmed on lakes in Karelia, and in the Barents and White Seas.

== History ==
The company was founded in 1997 as a reseller of Norwegian fish to Russia. Its previous name was "Russian Sea". In 2007, it commenced independent fish aquaculture and now operates in domestic and export markets. In 2010, the company listed with an IPO on the Moscow Stock Exchange.

In 2013, the company divested its finished products unit. In 2015, the Russian Sea changed its name to Russian Aquaculture. The company sold its holding in the Russian Fish Company in 2016 to a group of investors, retaining its interests in salmon and trout aquaculture. In July and October 2017, the company invested in hatcheries in Norway (Villa Smolt AS and Olden Oppdrettsanlegg AS). In that year, the company also raised over RUB 1bn ($17M) through a secondary public offering (SPO) co-run by two Russian banks, Gazprombank and Otkritie.

In 2018, the company invested RUB2.5 billion (US$40 million) in the construction of a new smolt production facility in Murmansk Oblast.

In 2019, the company reported that their salmon production had grown by three times and that output reached 18 000 tonnes.

As of 2020, the company owns farming licenses for 36 sites with a total potential for annual production of around 50,000 tonnes of salmonids per year.

At the end of 2020, Russian Aquaculture was listed on the Top-10 list of the most effective Russian investing companies by the NKR credit rating agency.

In March 2021, the company had successfully placed three-year bonds totaling EUR 33 million with an annual coupon rate of 9.5%.

By the end of Q1 2021, the company reported increased production volumes, with sales totaling 7,800 tonnes. This represents a 28% increase compared to the same period in 2020.

== Business operations ==
Russian Aquaculture's business consists of two operations: the cultivation of rainbow trout in the Republic of Karelia and the cultivation of Atlantic salmon and sea trout in the Murmansk region.

== Shareholders ==
Key shareholders as of December 31, 2020:

- 47,67% — Maxim Vorobyev;
- 24,99% — LLC UK Svinyin and partners;
- 28,9% — owned by other shareholders;
- 2,33% — purchased by the Group.

Board Member — Maxim Vorobyev;

General Director — Ilya Sosnov.

As of June 30, 2021, the Company's capitalization reached 31.8 billion rubles.
