= Peter Gleick =

American scientist

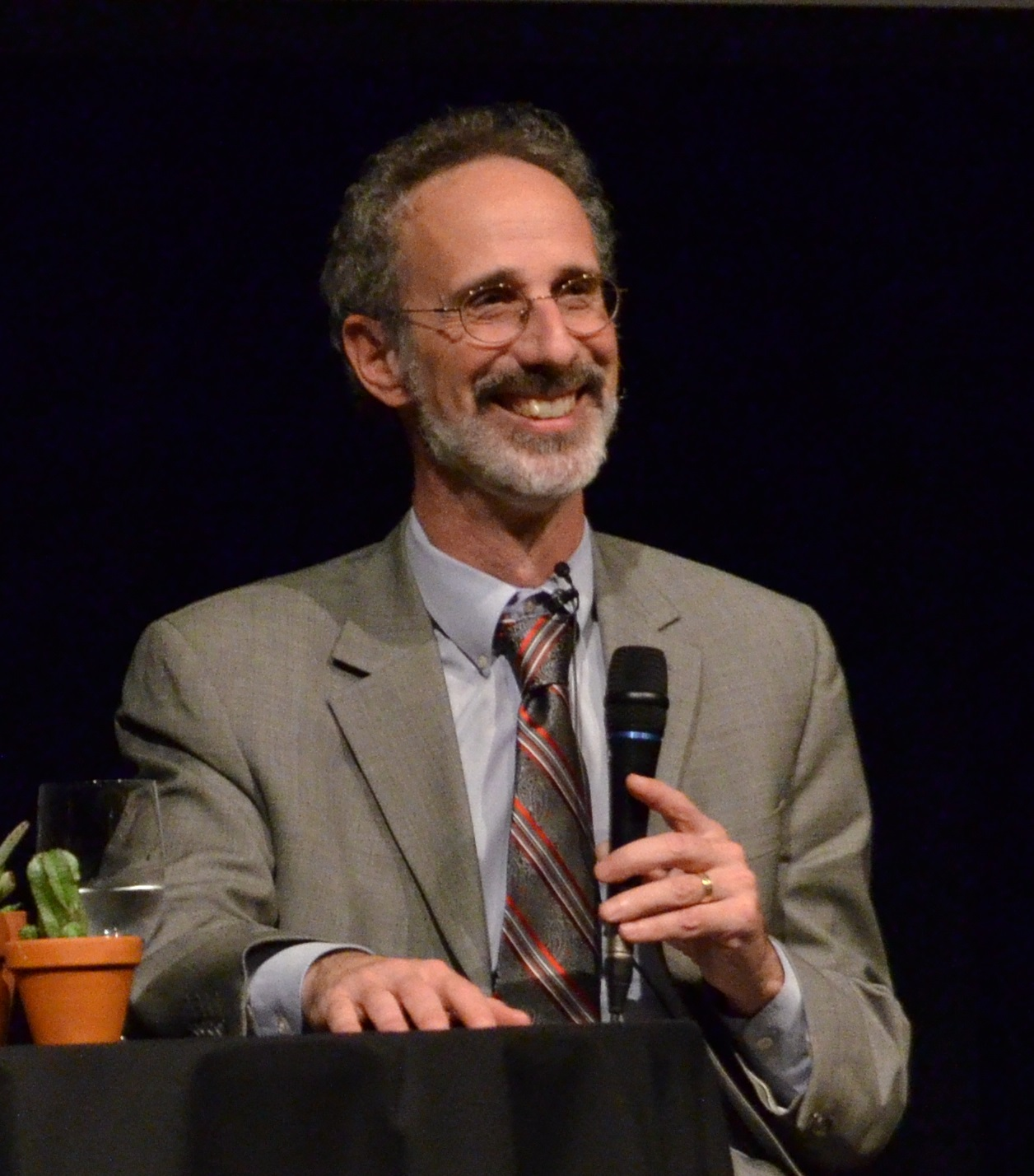
- Boston Museum of Science, April 2014
- Born: 1956 (age 69–70)
- Education: University of California, Berkeley; Yale University
- Occupations: President-emeritus and co-founder of the Pacific Institute
- Organization(s): Pacific Institute for Studies in Development, Environment, and Security
- Notable work: The World's Water, Bottled and Sold: The Story Behind Our Obsession with Bottled Water, A Twenty-First Century U.S. Water Policy
- Relatives: James Gleick, brother
- Website: pacinst.org/about-us/staff-and-board/dr-peter-h-gleick/, www.gleick.com

Peter H. Gleick (/ɡlɪk/; born 1956) is an American scientist working on issues related to the environment. He works at the Pacific Institute in Oakland, California, which he co-founded in 1987. In 2003 he was awarded a MacArthur Fellowship for his work on water resources. Among the issues he has addressed are conflicts over water resources, water and climate change, development, and human health.

In 2006 he was elected to the U.S. National Academy of Sciences. Gleick received the International Water Resources Association (IWRA) Ven Te Chow Memorial Award in 2011, and that same year he and the Pacific Institute were awarded the first U.S. Water Prize. In 2014, The Guardian newspaper listed Gleick as one of the world's top 10 "water tweeters." In 2018, Gleick received the Carl Sagan Prize for Science Popularization. In 2019, Boris Mints Institute of Tel Aviv University awarded Gleick its annual BMI Prize as "an exceptional individual who has devoted his/her research and academic life to the solution of a strategic global challenge." In 2023, he was elected to the American Academy of Arts and Sciences.

== Career ==
Gleick received a B.S. from Yale University and an M.S. and Ph.D. in energy and resources from the University of California, Berkeley, with a focus on hydroclimatology. His dissertation was the first to model the regional impact of climate change on water resources. Gleick produced some of the earliest work on the links between environmental issues, especially water and climate change, and international security, identifying a long history of conflicts over water resources and the use of water as both a weapon and target of war. He also pioneered the concepts of the soft water path, and peak water.

Gleick worked as the deputy assistant for energy and the environment to the governor of California from 1980 to 1982.

In 2003, he was awarded a MacArthur Fellowship for his work on water resources, and in 2006 he was elected to the U.S. National Academy of Sciences.

His 2010, book Bottled and Sold: The Story Behind Our Obsession with Bottled Water, published by Island Press, won the Nautilus Book Award in the Conscious Media/Journalism/Investigative Reporting category.

In 2011, Gleick received the International Water Resources Association (IWRA) Ven Te Chow Memorial Award. Also in 2011, Dr. Gleick and the Pacific Institute were awarded the first U.S. Water Prize.

In 2012, Oxford University Press published a book written by Gleick and colleagues: "A 21st Century U.S. Water Policy," and he was named one of 25 "Water Heroes" by Xylem. In 2013, Gleick was honored with a Lifetime Achievement Award by the Silicon Valley Water Conservation Awards.

In early 2013, Gleick launched a new blog at National Geographic ScienceBlogs entitled "Significant Figures." He was also a regular contributor to Huffington Post Green, and now most of these essays can be found at his personal website.

Gleick has also been featured in a wide range of water-related documentary films, including River's End: California's Latest Water War, Jim Thebaut's documentary "Running Dry", the 2004 German documentary series "Der durstige Planet," Irena Salina's feature documentary Flow: For Love of Water, accepted for the 2008 Sundance Film Festival, the ABC News documentary "Earth2100". Jessica Yu and Elise Pearlstein's 2011 feature documentary Last Call at the Oasis from Participant Media, and Pumped Dry: The Global Crisis of Vanishing Groundwater (A USA Today Network Production) USA Today. He served on the scientific advisory boards of Thirst, Grand Canyon Adventure: River at Risk, and other water-related films.

== Pacific Institute ==
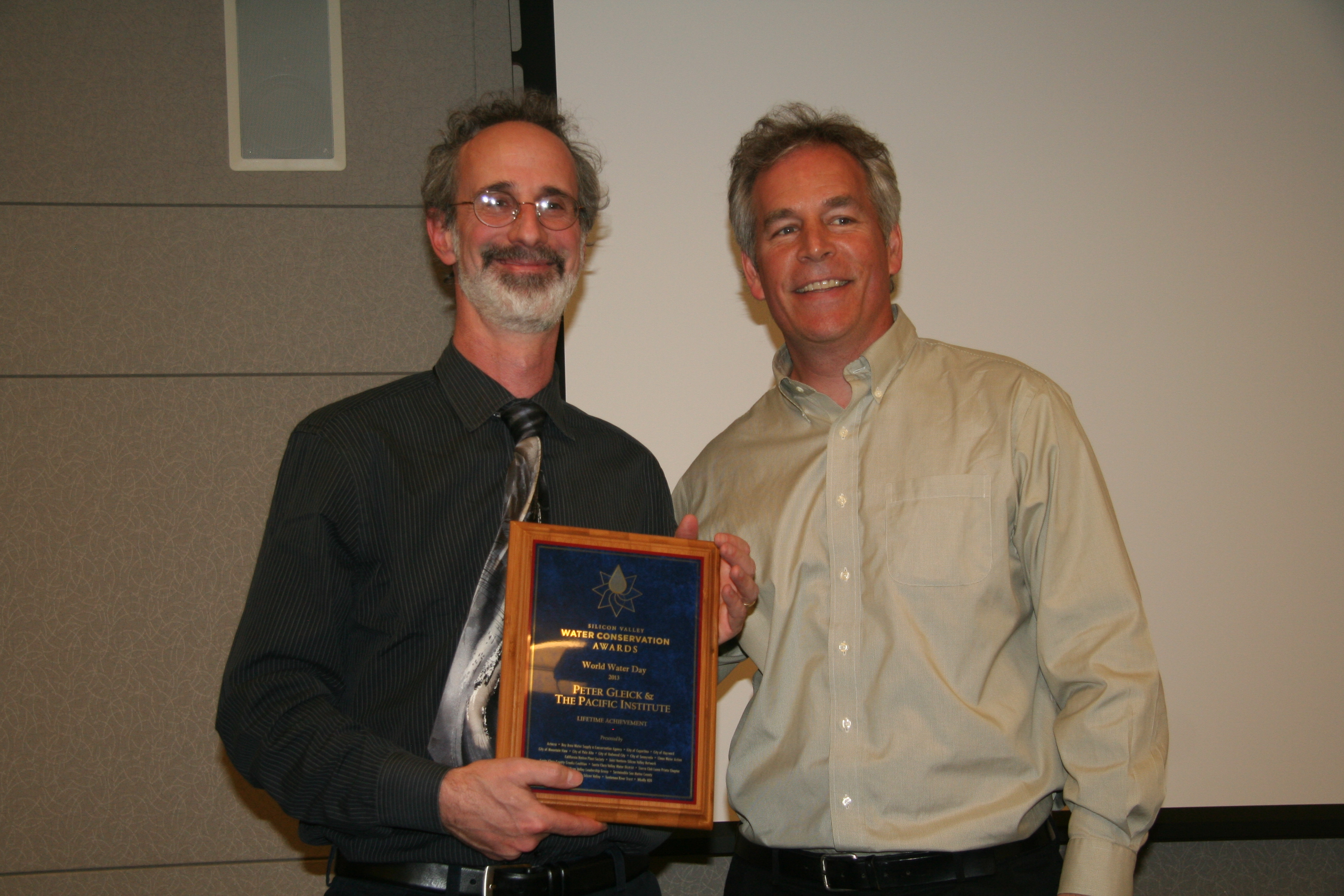
Peter Gleick receiving Lifetime Achievement Award from the Silicon Valley Water Conservation Awards

Peter Gleick's research addresses the cross-disciplinary connections among global environmental issues, with a focus on freshwater and climate change. In 1987, with two colleagues, Gleick started the Pacific Institute for Studies in Development, Environment, and Security, an independent non-profit policy research center currently located in Oakland, California. The mission of the Institute is "The Pacific Institute creates and advances solutions to the world's most pressing water challenges." Gleick currently serves as the Institute's President Emeritus, having been succeeded as president by Jason Morrison.

== Climate change and water ==
Gleick’s Ph.D dissertation from the University of California, Berkeley, and his early research, focused on the impacts of human-caused climate change for freshwater resources. He was the first to link the output of large-scale general circulation models of the climate with a detailed regional hydrologic model to evaluate how changes in temperature and precipitation would alter streamflow, snowpack, and soil moisture, with a focus on the Sacramento River basin in California. Among other results, this work was the first to call attention to the risks that rising temperatures would lead to accelerated snowmelt and a shift to earlier runoff in mountainous areas, leading to increased winter flood risk and reduced spring and summer runoff. Many of the impacts anticipated by this early work have now been observed. Gleick also served as co-lead author of the Water Sector Report of the first National Climate Assessment, published in 2000. The National Climate Assessment (NCA) is a United States government interagency ongoing effort on climate change science conducted under the auspices of the Global Change Research Act of 1990. The NCA is a major product of the U.S. Global Change Research Program (USGCRP) which coordinates a team of experts and receives input from a Federal Advisory Committee.

== Environment and security ==
As a post-doctoral fellow in 1987 and 1988 at the University of California, Berkeley, Gleick published some of the earliest work addressing the risks of environmental factors for national and international security, including both climate change and water resources. Up until this time, most academic work on international security was linked to realpolitik and superpower relationships between the United States and the Soviet Union. In the 1980s, tensions between the superpowers shifted after the collapse of the Soviet Union. Simultaneously, there was growing concern about a far broader range of threats to peace, including environmental threats associated with the political implications of resource use or large-scale pollution. By the mid-1980s, this field of study was becoming known as "environmental security" and it is now widely acknowledged that environmental factors play both direct and indirect roles in both political disputes and violent conflicts. Prominent early researchers in the field include Norman Myers, Jessica Tuchman Mathews, Michael Renner, Richard Ullman, Arthur Westing, Michael Klare, Thomas Homer Dixon, and Geoffrey Dabelko. Gleick’s 1989 paper in the journal Climatic Change addressed how climate changes could affect regional and global tensions over global food production, access to strategic minerals in the Arctic, and freshwater resources. and his 1993 paper in the journal International Security focused on the threat of violence over water resources. He has continued to focus on these issues and created and maintains the Water Conflict Chronology, a comprehensive online database of violence associated with water resources, published by the Pacific Institute. This database goes back 4,500 years, with over 2750 entries identifying where water resources or systems have been the trigger, casualty, or weapon of violence. This work has been recognized by military and intelligence community analysts and Gleick has briefed political military leaders and lectured at the U.S. Army War College and National War College in Washington D.C.

== The human right to water ==
Gleick also did some of the earliest work defining a human right to water. In the 20th century, the early focus of human rights laws were on political and civil rights protected by the 1948 Universal Declaration of Human Rights. By the 1960s, however, scholars and human rights experts were calling attention to economic, social, and cultural rights as well, with the 1966 covenant on International Covenant on Economic, Social and Cultural Rights (ICESCR). While neither of these declarations addressed water, by the 1990s, there was growing concern about the failure to provide safe water and sanitation for hundreds of millions, and scholars were calling for explicit recognition of a human right to water. Two early efforts to define the human right to water came from law professor Stephen McCaffrey of the University of the Pacific in 1992 and Gleick in 1998. McCaffrey stated that "Such a right could be envisaged as part and parcel of the right to food or sustenance, the right to health, or most fundamentally, the right to life. Gleick added: "that access to a basic water requirement is a fundamental human right implicitly and explicitly supported by international law, declarations, and State practice.” A 1996 paper from Gleick argued for defining and quantifying a basic water requirement of 50 liters of water per person per day for drinking, cooking, cleaning, and sanitation, and the United Nations cited this work in General Comment 15, drafted in 2002, which provided their clearest definition of the human right to water to that point United Nations Committee on Economic, Social and Cultural Rights in General Comment 15 drafted in 2002. General Comment 15 was a non-binding interpretation that access to water was a condition for the enjoyment of the right to an adequate standard of living, inextricably related to the right to the highest attainable standard of health, and therefore a human right. It stated: "The human right to water entitles everyone to sufficient, safe, acceptable, physically accessible and affordable water for personal and domestic uses." In 2010, the UN General Assembly formally adopted the human right to water and sanitation in General Assembly Resolution 64/292 on 28 July 2010. That Resolution recognized the right of every human being to have access to sufficient, safe, and affordable water for personal and domestic uses. In September 2010, the UN Human Rights Council adopted a resolution recognizing that the human right to water and sanitation forms part of the right to an adequate standard of living. Gleick’s work on basic water requirements and human rights was also used in the Mazibuko v. City of Johannesburg court case in South Africa addressing the human right to water in Phiri, one of the oldest areas of the Soweto township. The Pacific Institute contributed legal testimony for this case based on the work of Dr. Peter Gleick and the work of the Centre for Applied Legal Studies (CALS) of the University of the Witwatersrand in Johannesburg, South Africa and the Pacific Institute in Oakland, California was acknowledged with a 2008 Business Ethics Network BENNY Award.

== Current work ==
Gleick is the editor of the biennial series on the state of the world's water, called The World's Water, published by Island Press, Washington, D.C., regularly provides testimony to the United States Congress and state legislatures, and has published many scientific articles. The ninth volume of "The World's Water" was released in early February 2018. He serves as a major source of information on water and climate issues for the media, and has been featured on CNBC, CNN, Fox Business, Fresh Air with Terry Gross, NPR, in articles in The New Yorker, and many other outlets.

Gleick lectures dozens of times a year on global water resource challenges and solutions, climate science and policy, and the integrity of science. In 2008, he presented the Abel Wolman Distinguished Lecture at the United States National Academy of Sciences. He was a 2009 Keynote Lecturer at the Nobel Conference at Gustavus Adolphus College. In 2014, Gleick published a peer-reviewed article in the American Meteorological Society journal "Weather, Climate, and Society" (WCAS) that addressed the role of drought, climate change, and water management decisions in influencing the civil war in Syria. This article was the "most read" WCAS article for 2014.

In September 2014, Gleick gave a keynote address at the "Global Climate Negotiations: Lessons from California" Symposium, co-hosted by the USC Schwarzenegger Institute with the California Air Resources Board and the R20 Regions of Climate Action (R20) in Sacramento, which highlighted the different policies applied by the state of California facing the impact of climate change., In February 2015, Gleick's work on the "Water-Energy Nexus" was highlighted in an invited keynote at the Georgetown University 2015 Annual Symposium of the Center for Contemporary Arab Studies.

Other recent lectures include a keynote at the 2017 Symposium on the Human Right to Water in November 2017 at McGeorge School of Law, a keynote “The Beacon of Science in a Fact-Free Fog” at the 2019 SkeptiCal Conference, and a 2019 presentation at the World Bank’s Water Week on “Water, Climate, and Security: Building Resilience in a Fragile World.”

In 2023, Gleick released a new book “The Three Ages of Water,” published by PublicAffairs/Hachette, receiving favorable reviews from David Wallace-Wells, Elizabeth Kolbert, Jerry Brown, and Greta Thunberg.

== Heartland Institute incident ==
On February 20, 2012, Gleick announced he was responsible for the unauthorized distribution of documents from The Heartland Institute in mid-February. Gleick reported he had received "an anonymous document in the mail describing what appeared to be details of the Heartland Institute's climate program strategy", and in trying to verify the authenticity of the document, had "solicited and received additional materials directly from the Heartland Institute under someone else's name". Responding to the leak, The Heartland Institute said one of the documents released, a two-page 'Strategy Memo', had been forged. Gleick denied forging the document. Gleick described his actions as "a serious lapse of my own and professional judgment and ethics" and said that he "deeply regret[ted his] own actions in this case" and "offer[ed his] personal apologies to all those affected". He stated that "My judgment was blinded by my frustration with the ongoing efforts – often anonymous, well-funded, and coordinated – to attack climate science and scientists and prevent this debate, and by the lack of transparency of the organizations involved." On February 24 he wrote to the board of the Pacific Institute requesting a "temporary short-term leave of absence" from the Institute. The Board of Directors stated it was "deeply concerned regarding recent events" involving Gleick and the Heartland documents, and appointed a new Acting Executive Director on February 27. Gleick was reinstated following an investigation, in which the institute found no evidence to support charges of forgery and "supported what Dr. Gleick has stated publicly regarding his interaction with the Heartland Institute."

== Honors ==
- 1999 Elected Academician of the International Water Academy, Oslo, Norway
- 2001 Named by the BBC as a "Visionary on the Environment" in its Essential Guide to the 21st Century
- 2001 Appointed to Water Science and Technology Board of the National Academy of Sciences, Washington, D.C.
- 2003 MacArthur Fellow "Genius Award"
- 2005 Elected Fellow of the International Water Resources Association
- 2006 Elected Fellow of the American Association for the Advancement of Science
- 2006 Elected Member of the United States National Academy of Sciences
- 2008 Selected to Present the Abel Wolman Distinguished Lecture at the United States National Academy of Sciences, April 23, 2008, Washington, D.C.
- 2008 Named by Wired Magazine's Smart List as one of "15 people the next President should listen to"
- 2009 Keynote Lecturer at the Nobel Conference at Gustavus Adolphus College in St. Peter, Minnesota
- 2010 Named "Visionary: A Catalyst for an Enlightened Future" in the Los Angeles Times Magazine, January 3, 2010
- 2011 Winner, along with the Pacific Institute of the first U.S. Water Prize
- 2011 Winner of the IWRA Ven Te Chow Memorial Award
- 2012 Nominee for the Rockefeller Foundation Next Century Innovators Award.
- 2012 Named one of 25 "Water Heroes" by Xylem.
- 2013 Honored with a Lifetime Achievement Award by the Silicon Valley Water Conservation Awards, March 21, 2013
- 2014 Named one of world's "Top 10 Water Tweeters" by the Guardian.
- 2015 Received the Leadership and Achievement Award from the Council of Scientific Society Presidents.
- 2015 Received the Carla Bard Environmental Education Award from the Bay Institute.
- 2018 Carl Sagan Prize for Science Popularization
- 2019 Awarded the Boris Mints Institute Prize.
- 2023 Elected to the American Academy of Arts and Sciences.

== Books ==
- Peter H. Gleick (editor), Water in Crisis: A Guide to the World's Fresh Water Resources. Oxford University Press, New York, 1993. ISBN 978-0-19-507628-8
- Peter H. Gleick, The World's Water 1998–1999 (Volume 1): The Biennial Report on Freshwater Resources. Island Press, Washington D.C., 1998.
- Peter H. Gleick, The World's Water 2000–2001 (Volume 2): The Biennial Report on Freshwater Resources. Island Press, Washington D.C., 2000.
- Peter H. Gleick and associates, The World's Water 2002–2003 (Volume 3): The Biennial Report on Freshwater Resources. Island Press, Washington D.C., 2002.
- Peter H. Gleick and associates, The World's Water 2004–2005 (Volume 4): The Biennial Report on Freshwater Resources. Island Press, Washington D.C., 2004.
- Peter H. Gleick and associates, The World's Water 2006–2007 (Volume 5): The Biennial Report on Freshwater Resources. Island Press, Washington D.C., 2006.
- Peter H. Gleick and associates, The World's Water 2008–2009 (Volume 6); The Biennial Report on Freshwater Resources. Island Press, Washington D.C., 2008.
- Peter H. Gleick and associates, The World's Water (Volume 7): The Biennial Report on Freshwater Resources. Island Press, Washington D.C., 2011.
- Peter H. Gleick, Bottled and Sold: The Story Behind Our Obsession with Bottled Water. Island Press, Washington D.C., 2010. Website: Bottled and Sold
- Juliet Christian-Smith and Peter H. Gleick (editors), A 21st Century U.S. Water Policy. Oxford University Press, New York, 2012. ISBN 9780199859443. Oxford University Press catalog webpage
- Peter H. Gleick and associates, The World's Water (Volume 8): The Biennial Report on Freshwater Resources. Island Press, Washington D.C., 2014. ISBN 9781610914819. ISBN 9781610914826 Island Press catalog webpage
- Peter H. Gleick and associates, The World's Water (Volume 9): The Biennial Report on Freshwater Resources. Pacific Institute, Oakland, California, 2018. ISBN 1983865885. ISBN 978-1983865886 Pacific Institute World Water webpage
- Peter H. Gleick. The Three Ages of Water: Prehistoric Past, Imperiled Present, and a Hope for the Future. PublicAffairs/Hachette, 2023 ISBN 9781541702271.
