= Pacific Institute =

American nonprofit organization

Pacific Institute for Studies in Development, Environment, and Security
- Type: 501(c)(3) non-profit
- Purpose: Water conservation think tank
- Location: Oakland, California
- President: Jason Morrison
- President Emeritus: Peter H. Gleick
- Chief Operating Officer: Pete Stanga
- Revenue: ▲US$2.08 million (2016)
- Expenses: ▼US$2.11 million (2016)
- Website: www.pacinst.org

The Pacific Institute for Studies in Development, Environment, and Security is an American non-profit research institute created in 1987 to provide independent research and policy analysis on issues of development, environment, and security, with a particular focus on global and regional freshwater issues. It is located in Oakland, California.

The institute's primary focus is on creating "a world in which society, the economy, and the environment have the water they need to thrive now and in the future." The mission of the institute is to "create and advance solutions to the world’s most pressing water challenges."

== History and research ==
Institute staff analyze science and policy to provide solutions to sustainable water issues, provide workshops and briefings for communities involved in issues surrounding water, climate, energy, environmental security, and globalization, and address challenges around hydrologic sciences, water management, and water policy. Institute researchers in 2014 warned that the lack of replenishment water in the Salton Sea was leading to a "period of very rapid deterioration." With the increased shrinkage, dust storms would increase and a rotten-egg smell could reach to the coastal cities. The Institute regularly published the biennial report on the world's water, with nine volumes between 1998 and 2018 (The World's Water: The Biennial Report on Freshwater Resources). In 2012 the Institute produced a new book A 21st Century U.S. Water Policy published by Oxford University Press. The Institute's Water Conflict Chronology tracks water-related conflicts since 2500 BC, with over 2750 entries as of mid-2025.

Peter Gleick co-founded the institute in 1987 and directed it until mid-2016. Gleick is now president emeritus and Senior Fellow, having been succeeded as president by Jason Morrison.
