= River's End: California's Latest Water War =

2021 American documentary

- Directed by: Jacob Morrison
- Written by: Jacob Morrison
- Produced by: Kurt S. Kittleson Sam Furie Jacob Morrison
- Starring: DeLanna Studi (narrator)
- Cinematography: Benjamin Fischinger
- Edited by: Jacob Morrison
- Music by: Jonny Bell
- Distributed by: Giant Pictures
- Release date: November 2, 2021
- Running time: 81 minutes
- Country: United States
- Language: English

River's End: California's Latest Water War is a 2021 American documentary film written and directed by Jacob Morrison. It follows the competition over California's limited water resources amid worsening droughts, as well as the decline of freshwater ecosystems in the California Delta. The documentary draws parallels to the California water wars featured in the 1974 film Chinatown.

The film had its world premiere at the 2021 Wild & Scenic Film Festival on January 14, 2021, where it won the Jury Award and People's Choice Award. It then played at the International Wildlife Film Festival where it won its category. It was released on video on demand by Giant Pictures on November 2, 2021. It received acclaim from critics, with praise for its story, interviews, cinematography, animation, and subject matter.

== Plot ==
The film explores the struggle over California's limited freshwater resources during recent periods of drought, with particular focus on the expansion of almond groves in the Westlands Water District. The film explores the connection between increased water use for agriculture, and the decline of freshwater ecosystems in the Sacramento–San Joaquin River Delta. The documentary also draws parallels between the construction of the Los Angeles Aqueduct during the historic California water wars, and the now proposed conveyance tunnels in the Sacramento-San Joaquin River Delta.

== Cast ==
- Narrated by DeLanna Studi
- Subjects include (but are not limited to):
  - Peter Gleick
  - Bettina Boxall
  - Richard White (historian)
  - Jared Huffman
  - Tom McClintock
  - George Miller (California politician)

== Reception ==
The film received positive reviews from critics. Film Threat gave the film a 9/10 rating, writing that River's End "…effectively uses beautiful scenic photography, well-executed interviews, archival footage, and helpful animation." New Scientist also praised the film, stating that "River’s End provides a thorough overview of California’s water issues and the need to achieve a sustainable water supply." Counterpunch wrote, " I urge you to see this timely, very important, indeed, great film: River’s End." National Observer (Canada) gave the film a positive review, writing, "This is a documentary with a bite... anybody who buys produce from California, basically, most of us, should be interested." The film was included in several end-of-year lists as one of the best environmental films of 2021.
