= Yury Seliverstov =

Belarusian politician (born 1978)

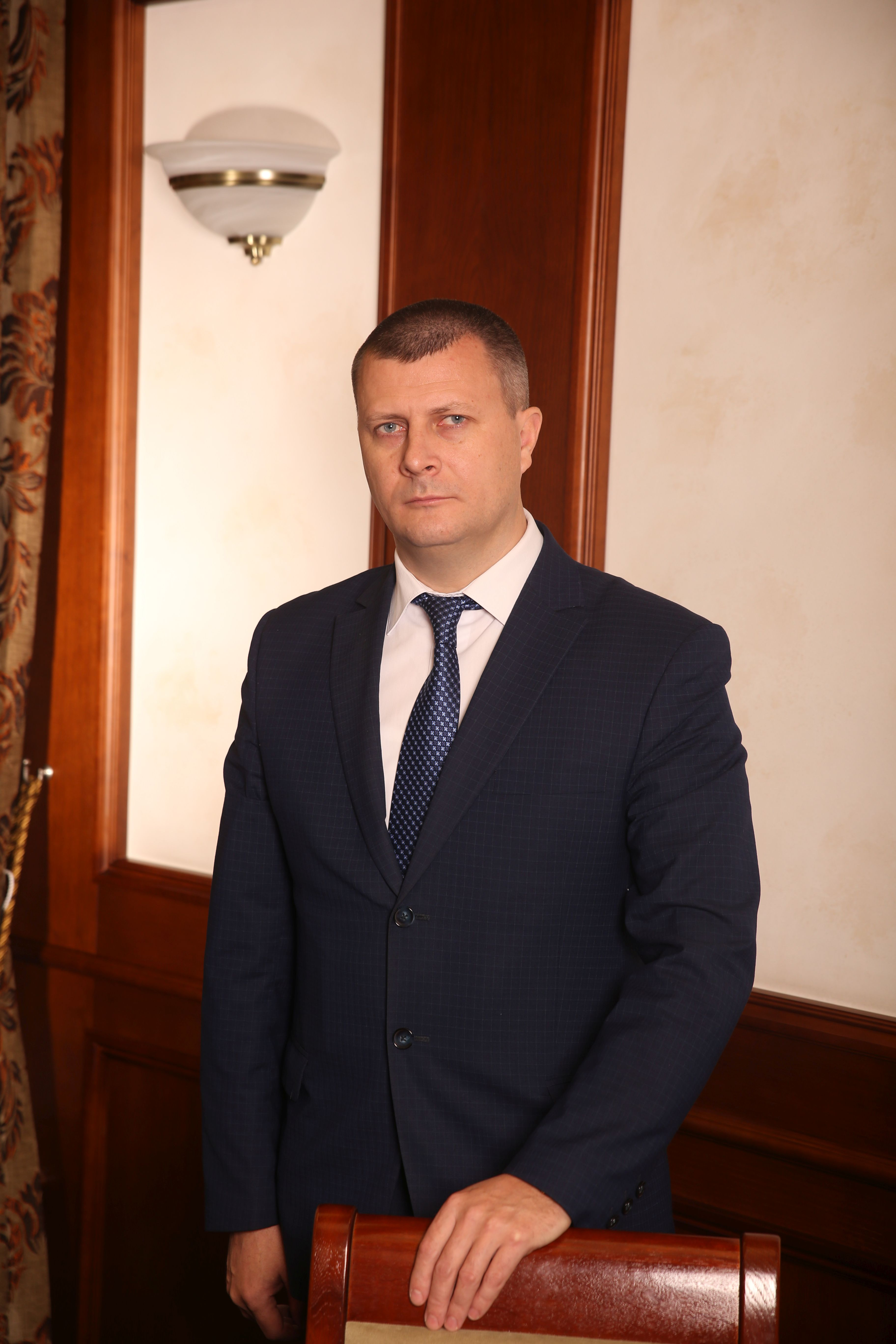
- Seliverstov in 2018

Minister of Finance
- Incumbent
- Assumed office 4 June 2020
- President: Alexander Lukashenko
- Prime Minister: Roman Golovchenko
- Preceded by: Maksim Yermalovich

Personal details
- Born: 12 April 1978 (age 48)

Yury Mikhailovich Seliverstov (Russian: Юрий Михайлович Селиверстов; born 12 April 1978) is a Belarusian politician serving as minister of finance since 2020. From 2018 to 2020, he served as first deputy minister of finance.
