= Gosstrakh SSSR =

Financial service company of the Soviet Union

- Company type: Government-owned corporation
- Industry: Insurance
- Founded: 1921
- Founder: Sovnarkom
- Defunct: 1992
- Successor: Various companies in post-Soviet republics
- Headquarters: Moscow, Soviet Union
- Owner: Soviet Ministry of Finance

Gosstrakh SSSR (Russian: Госстрах СССР; clipped compound of Государственное страхование, romanized: gosudarstvennoye strakhovaniye, lit. 'national insurance') was the unified union-republican system of state insurance agencies in the USSR, under the jurisdiction of the USSR Ministry of Finance.

== History ==
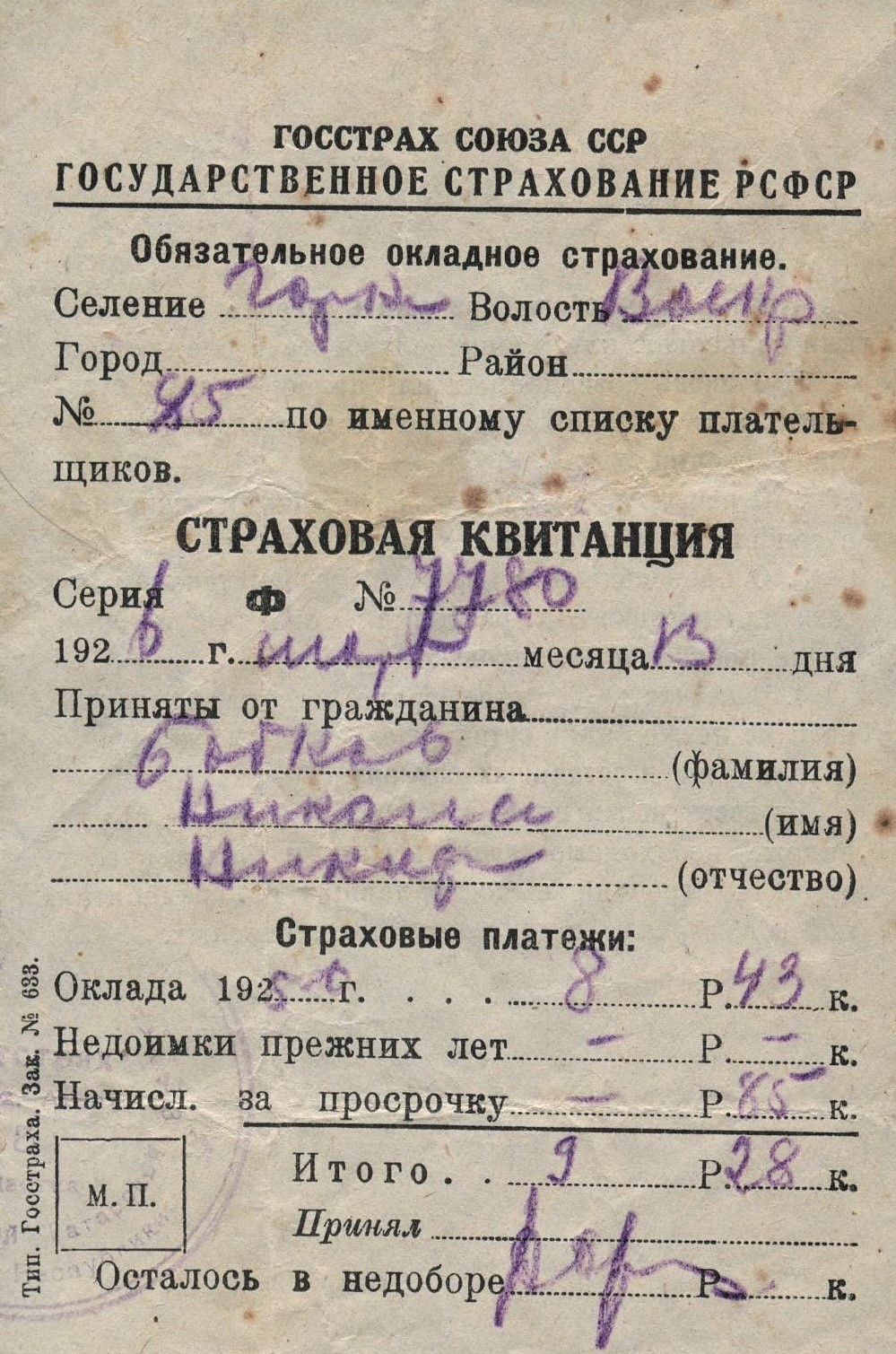
Gosstrakh insurance policy from 1926

After the October Revolution, the insurance system in Russia changed completely. By the decree of the Council of People's Commissars of the RSFSR of March 23, 1918, the activities of joint-stock insurance companies were significantly limited, and zemstvo and mutual insurance were transferred to the jurisdiction of councils and economic councils. Eight months later, on November 28, 1918, the decree "On the organization of insurance business in the Russian Republic" was adopted, according to which insurance in the country was declared a state monopoly, and all property and capital belonging to private companies were transferred to the state. The subsequent era of the New Economic Policy led to the revival of private peasant farming and small business, which existed in parallel with cooperation and state economic bodies.

Commercial and developing economic activity required the reorganization of insurance, the restoration of which was carried out by the decree of the Council of People's Commissars signed by Vladimir Lenin on October 6, 1921 "On state property insurance", which laid the foundations for the creation and development of state insurance. In the course of implementing this decree, the Main Directorate of State Insurance (Gosstrakh) was formed within the People's Commissariat of Finance of the USSR, and state property insurance was resumed in the form of a state insurance monopoly. The decree of October 6, 1921 prescribed "to organize in all areas of the RSFSR, both rural and urban, state property insurance of private households against the following natural disasters: fires, livestock death, hail damage to crops, as well as accidents on water and land transport routes".

On September 18, 1925, the Presidium of the Central Executive Committee and the Council of People's Commissars of the Soviet Union approved the "Regulations on State Insurance of the USSR". According to this Regulation, it was established that "state insurance is carried out throughout the territory of the USSR by a single enterprise, Gosstrakh, enjoying the rights of a legal entity" Gosstrakh was instructed to carry out general management and supervision of insurance operations and the organization of insurance business throughout the USSR, was given the right to manage the property and capital of state insurance, develop insurance rules, insurance rates, all-Union insurance plans, study natural phenomena and risks provided for by various types of insurance.

In 1941-1950 the volume of payments for "internal" insurance amounted to 14.8 billion rubles, of which the maximum volume of payments occurred in 1948 - 2.3 billion rubles.

During the Great Patriotic War, Gosstrakh of the USSR continued to work quite actively in the unoccupied territories. In 1942, 5.1 million horses, 17.3 million heads of cattle, 71.2 million hectares of crops were insured in Gosstrakh. 11.7 million buildings were accepted for insurance, and the company had 5.8 million life insurance contracts in force.

=== 1945-1970 ===
After the end of the war, economic life in the country began to recover. In 1950, 10.1 million horses were accepted for insurance (of which 4.8 million were in the RSFSR), 48.6 million heads of cattle (26 million in the RSFSR), 27.9 million buildings (14.5 million in Russia), and 121.8 million hectares of crops (76.5 million in the RSFSR). Due to the liquidation of collective life insurance, the number of active contracts for this type of operation fell to 1.4 million. After the war, Gosstrakh SSSR had a new market: in 1946, 99 private cars were accepted for insurance for the first time. This type of insurance developed very quickly: in 1950, 1.5 thousand private cars were already accepted for insurance with a total insurance amount of 14.4 million rubles. The share of voluntary insurance in the Gosstrakh portfolio began to grow. Thus, in 1947, the premium amounted to 4.5 billion rubles, of which 3.1 billion rubles (69.2%) were for compulsory insurance, and 1.4 billion rubles (30.7%) were for voluntary insurance. In the 1960s, the operations of Gosstrakh SSSR continued to develop. The total collection of insurance premiums for the decade amounted to 18.2 billion rubles (the reduction in collections is due to the monetary reform in 1961, which led to a 10-fold decrease in the par value), which corresponds to 127.9 billion dollars in 2009 prices. The share of voluntary insurance in the company's portfolio continues to grow.

=== 1970s ===
In 1970, insurance premium collections amounted to 3.4 billion rubles, 62.3 million heads of cattle (in the RSFSR - 29.5 million), 36 million buildings (in the RSFSR - 17.5 million), 339.4 thousand private cars (in the RSFSR - 178 thousand) were accepted for insurance. The number of active life insurance contracts increased to 17.7 million (in the RSFSR - 13 million).

1971-1980 Gosstrakh SSSR collected 75.1 billion rubles over the decade (380.4 billion dollars of insurance premiums in 2009 prices). For comparison, in Russia in 2011 the total collection of insurance premiums without compulsory medical insurance was 20.6 billion dollars in total for 572 insurance companies operating in the market). The record year was 1980, when 11.7 billion rubles were collected (half of which was for life insurance). In the 70s, the share of voluntary insurance exceeded half of the portfolio. Thus, the total volume of premiums for 1977 was 8.1 billion rubles. Of these, 2.5 billion rubles (31%) were for compulsory insurance, and 5.5 billion rubles (69%) for voluntary insurance.

The total volume of payments for the decade for “internal” insurance was 50.3 billion rubles, the maximum volume of payments was in 1979 — 9.4 billion rubles.

In 1980, the collected premiums amounted to 11.7 billion rubles; Gosstrakh SSSR insured 108.4 million heads of cattle (in the RSFSR - 55.8 million), 36.4 million buildings (in the RSFSR - 17 million), 217 million hectares of various agricultural crops (in the RSFSR - 126 million), 3.2 million private cars (in the RSFSR - 2 million). The number of active life insurance contracts increased to 62.1 million (in the RSFSR - 40.5 million).

=== 1981-1990 ===
The 1980s were quite successful for Gosstrakh SSSR in economic terms. The total amount of premiums for the decade was 160.9 billion rubles (456.6 billion dollars in 2009 prices). The record year was 1990, when premiums amounted to 20 billion rubles, more than half of which were from life insurance. In 1990, the share of voluntary insurance in the Gosstrakh portfolio was 60.3%.

In the 1980s, Gosstrakh's staff grew steadily, and by 1990 it had almost 90 thousand employees, and another 143.5 thousand worked as agents (excluding part-time workers). The number of the latter, however, decreased slightly from 1985 to 1990, but did not fall below the 1980 levels.

Over the decade, the total volume of payments for “internal” insurance amounted to 86 billion rubles, with the maximum volume of payments occurring in 1990 – 15.980 million rubles.

In 1991, in connection with the collapse of the USSR, the union-republican system of state insurance bodies was abolished. On the basis of the former republican boards of Gosstrakh SSSR (in the former union republics), insurance companies were created in the new independent states.

In the Russian Federation in 1992, in accordance with the Order of the Government of Russia, the Board of Gosstrakh and the republican administration of Gosstrakh SSSR were transformed into the Russian state joint-stock insurance company Rosgosstrakh, 100% of whose shares belonged to the State Property Committee of the Russian Federation. In Belarus, the republican administration of Gosstrakh SSSR was transformed into Belgosstrakh while in Ukraine the republican entity was transformed into Ukrderzhstrakh.

== Operations ==
All Gosstrakh operations were divided into compulsory ("salary") and voluntary insurance. Peasants' horses, cattle, private houses - in the countryside and in the city, as well as crops - were insured on a compulsory basis. The population could insure the same objects "in addition to the salary" - up to the full value of the insured object. State property was not subject to compulsory insurance. Collective farms, which were formally cooperative enterprises, insured their property. And state farms, considered state enterprises, were not subject to compulsory insurance - the state assumed their risks. Compulsory "salary" insurance of state farms was introduced only in the early 1970s. The territorial bodies of Gosstrakh were built by former agents of zemstvo mutual insurance societies (in today's terminology, these are the heads of regional divisions of the insurance company) - more than 5 thousand such agents were hired by Gosstrakh SSSR.

=== Abroad ===
Gosstrakh entered the foreign market at the beginning of 1924 in connection with the insurance of Soviet import and export. Before this period, export and import were insured by trade missions and other Soviet organizations abroad in foreign insurance companies.

The Trade Mission in Germany, ARCOS and Centrosoyuz in London, Amtorg Trading Corporation in New York had long-term agreements with foreign insurance companies, so-called general policies, on the basis of which they assumed an obligation to insure all their cargo with them - both during the sea and rail journey, and while they were in the warehouse.

Gosstrakh concluded its first reinsurance contract in March 1924 with one of the largest English insurance companies. This contract did not last very long; already in October of the same year, Gosstrakh was forced to terminate it and conclude a new agreement with a whole group of English insurance companies.

Soon after the conclusion of the transport contract, Gosstrakh concluded an agreement on reinsurance of risks in warehouses both in foreign territory and in the territory of the Soviet Union, including the reinsurance of timber, for which it was necessary to present foreign policies in connection with their collateral in foreign banks.

Insurance companies from England, Italy, Germany, France, Spain, Czechoslovakia, Austria, Norway and Japan participate in the reinsurance contract of Gosstrakh for 1936.

In order to improve the service of insurance of export and import, as well as to establish connections in foreign insurance markets, Gosstrakh, together with the People's Commissariat of Foreign Trade and Cooperation, founded in London at the beginning of 1925 a joint-stock company with a paid-up capital of 100 thousand pounds sterling under the name "Blackbalsey" in London. A similar company called "SOVAG" was organized in 1927 in Hamburg with a capital of 1 million German marks, of which 250 thousand German marks were paid.

Of even greater importance for Gosstrakh's currency balance were its insurance operations in Eastern countries, primarily in Mongolia, then in China, Iran and Tuva, where Gosstrakh worked through its general representative offices.

== Structure ==
The following agencies were part of the USSR state insurance system:

- Main Administration of State Insurance of the USSR;
- Agency of State Insurance of the Union Republics;
- Agency of State Insurance of the Autonomous Republics;
- Agency of State Insurance of Regions, Territories, and cities of republican subordination;
- City and District Insurance Inspectorates
