= Otkritie Holding =

Russian financial group

- Formerly: Otkritie Financial Corporation and Otkrytiye investment group
- Company type: Public company
- Industry: Financial services
- Predecessor: VEO-Invest and Otkritie
- Founded: 1995
- Founder: Vadim Belyaev
- Defunct: February 2020
- Fate: Bankrupt
- Headquarters: Moscow, Russia
- Area served: Russia
- Key people: Boris Mints (Chairman), Vadim Belyaev (CEO)
- Products: Loans, banking services
- Website: www.openholding.ru

Otkritie Holding (Russian: Открытие Холдинг), formerly Otkritie Financial Corporation, was a Russian private financial group. It had owned a major Russian bank and other financial companies and investments. The company was declared bankrupt in 2022.

By 2017, the group consisted of Otkritie FC Bank (66.64% as of 2017), Otkritie Capital, Otkritie Broker, Otkritie Asset Management, Arkhangelskgeoldobycha (diamond miner) and it also held minority stakes in a number of companies in their segments of the financial market: Baltic Leasing, Qiwi, Lukoil-Garant Non-State Pension Fund, Non-State Pension Fund of the Electric Power Industry, and RCB Bank (Cyprus) which it sold in 2017.

== History ==
The founder of the Otkritie group is Russian businessman Vadim Belyaev, who began doing business in the early 1990s. In 1995, he was one of the initiators of the formation of the company VEO-Invest, which was engaged in investing in Russian telecommunications assets.

In 2001, VEO-Invest merged with the brokerage company Otkrytie, which specialized in the trading of derivative financial instruments and provided services for access to trading in the stock section of the Moscow Interbank Currency Exchange (MICEX) via the Internet. As a result of the merger, VEO-Otkrytie was formed, which began to provide a wide range of services including acting as broker dealer, depository services, trust management and corporate finance management. Belyaev was the 75% owner of the merged firm.

In 2004, Boris Mints became Belyaev's partner. The Investment Group Otkritie was created with Belyaev as its CEO and Mintz as the chairman of the board of directors. The changes marked the beginning of the transformation of a small brokerage firm into a financial group.

As of 2016 Otkritie Holding was Russia's largest private financial group, and ranked among Russia’s 35 largest corporations according to RBC 500.

In 2017, the Central Bank of the Russian Federation began the rehabilitation of Otkritie Holding's main asset, Otkritie Bank. During the related activities, Otkritie Holding lost this and almost all of its other assets. As a result, in 2020, Otkritie Holdings filed for bankruptcy

Otkritie Holding was declared bankrupt in 2022. In January 2024 assets (money and property) worth over 900 billion rubles of six former managers of Otkrytie Holding were seized, including assets of ex-president Ruben Aganbegyan and ex-chairman of the board Alexey Karakhan.

== Subsidiaries ==
=== Otkrytiye bank (1992-2014) ===
Bank Otkrytiye, formerly Russian Development Bank (Russkiy Bank Razvitiya), was a Russian commercial bank in 1992-2014, a part of Otkrytiye Holding.

In 2014, Otkritie Bank and Novosibirsk Municipal Bank were merged into the Bank of Khanty-Mansiysk and the resulting bank is named Khanty-Mansiysk Otkritie Bank.

=== Khanty-Mansiysk Otkritie Bank (1992-2016) ===
Khanty-Mansiysk Otkritie Bank, formerly Khanty-Mansiysk Bank, was a Russian commercial bank in 1992-2016, a part of Otkrytiye Holding. Otkritie Holding completed the legal takeover of Khanty-Mansiysk Otkritie Bank by Otkritie FC Bank in 2016.

== Owners ==
Otkrytiye Holding Shareholder Structure:

- Vadim Belyaev (28.61%)
- IFD Group — 19.9%
- VTB Bank (9.99%)
- ICT Holding (9.82%)
- Ruben Aganbegyan (7.96%)
- Alexander Mamut (6.67%)
