= Belgosstrakh =

Belarusian insurance company

Belarusian Republican Unitary Insurance Enterprise "Belgosstrakh"
- Company type: Government-owned corporation
- Industry: Insurance
- Predecessor: Gosstrakh SSSR
- Founded: 1921 (1991 in current form)
- Founder: Government of Belarus
- Headquarters: Minsk, Belarus
- Key people: Sergey Yakubitsky
- Owner: Belarusian Ministry of Finance
- Number of employees: 5,451 (2022)
- Website: bgs.by

Belarusian Republican Unitary Insurance Enterprise "Belgosstrakh" (Belarusian: Беларускае рэспубліканскае унітарнае страхавое прадпрыемства "Белдзяржстрах") known also in its short name Beldzyarzhstrakh (Belarusian: Белдзяржстрах) or in its Russian spelling Belgosstrakh (Russian: Белгосстрах) is a universal insurance company in Belarus. Belgosstrakh is wholly owned by the Belarusian government. While it is not formally a monopoly, it remains the largest insurance company in Belarus. and is leading the market together with Beleximgarant. According to the Belarusian legislation, tourists entering Belarus need to hold a valid insurance policy issued either by Belgossrakh or Beleximgarant.

== History ==
The company was established by a Government of Belarus in accordance with resolution No. 399 of October 31, 1991 from the Main Department of State Insurance of the Ministry of Finance, as the successor of the Belarusian branch of the Soviet Gosstrakh SSSR, itself established on December 3, 1921. In 2003 it received its current status of a republican unitary enterprise. According to the legislation, since 2004 the company has had the exclusive right to compulsory insurance against accidents at work and occupational diseases (worker's compensation), as well as civil liability of the carrier to passengers.

Based on the reporting data for 2020, Belgosstrakh reported an increase in profit to RUB 55 million in 2020 from RUB 10 million in 2019. In 2024 it was reported that the company stopped insuring a number of luxury cars companies, including Ferrari, Bentley and Lamborghini.
