= Oranta (company) =

Ukrainian insurance company

National Joint-stock Insurance Company "Oranta"
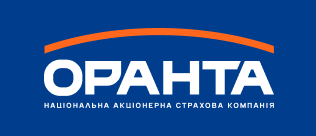
- Company type: Joint-stock company
- Industry: Insurance
- Predecessor: Gosstrakh USSR
- Founded: 25 November 1921; 104 years ago
- Headquarters: Kyiv, Ukraine
- Area served: Ukraine
- Products: Insurance
- Website: oranta.ua

National joint-stock insurance company Oranta (Ukrainian: Національна акціонерна страхова компанія «Оранта») is the oldest insurance company in Ukraine, which provides a wide range of insurance services to both individuals and legal entities. The company is the legal successor of State Insurance of the Ukrainian SSR, a division of Gosstrakh USSR.

== History ==
The company traces its existence back to 1921, when the state insurance system was created in the Ukrainian SSR. During the Soviet period, State Insurance of the Ukrainian SSR had a monopoly on insurance in Ukraine, controlling both compulsory and voluntary insurance and playing an important role in meeting the socio-economic needs of society.

After the collapse of the Soviet Union and Ukraine's independence, the republican affiliation of the Gosstrakh, established on November 25, 1921, was incorporated as Ukrderzhstrakh (Ukrainian: Укрдержстрах).

On September 7, 1993, it was transformed into the National Joint-Stock Insurance Company Oranta, the founder of which was the State Property Fund of Ukraine. In 2007, the State Property Fund of Ukraine sold the last block of shares in state ownership to a private investor.

Since 1994, Oranta has been a full member of the Motor (Transport) Insurance Bureau of Ukraine (MTSBU), and since 2003 a member of the Nuclear Insurance Pool.

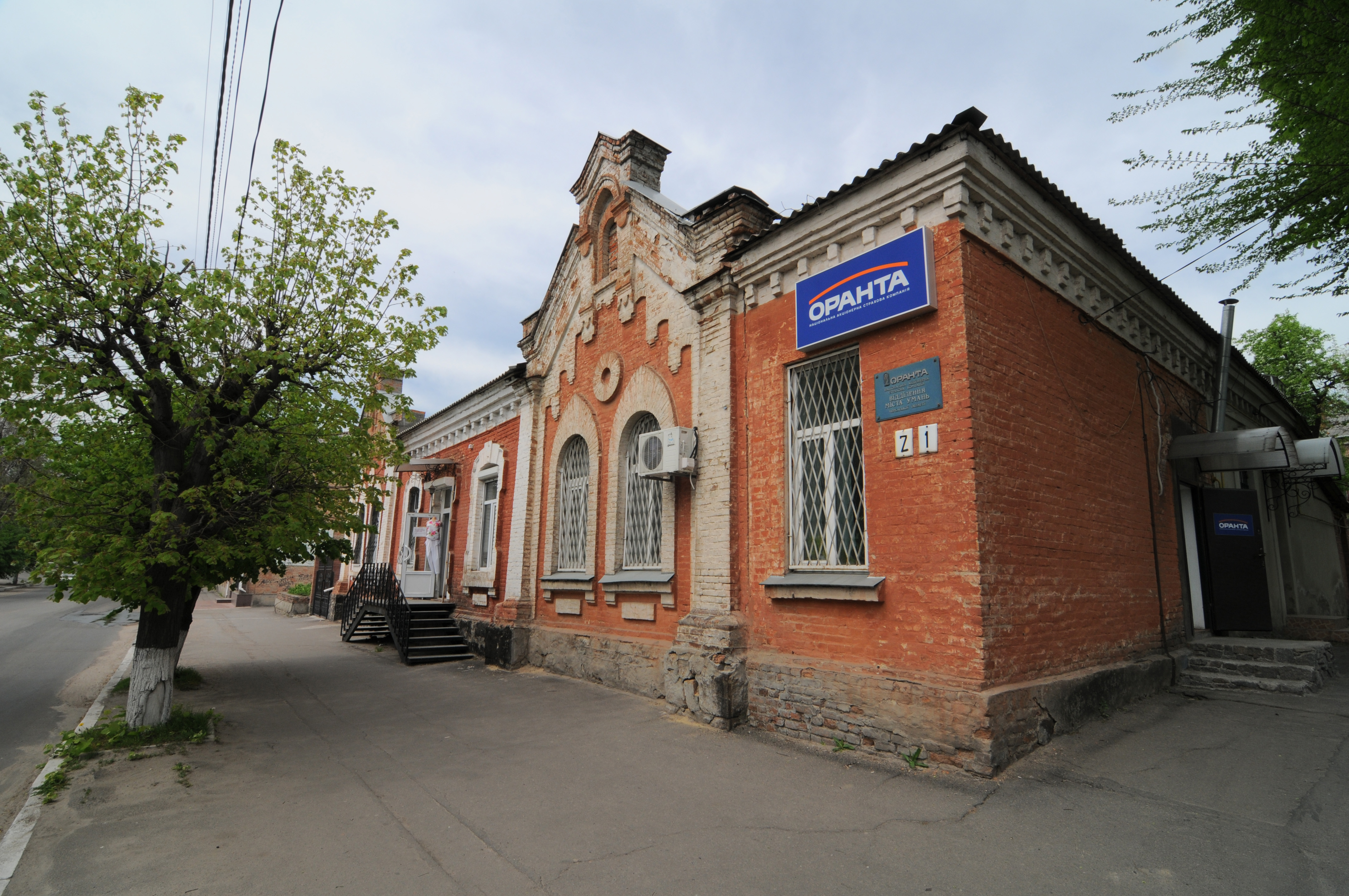
Branch in Ukraine

In September 2008, Oranta became one of the founders of the Ukrainian Insurance Federation (UFU). In December 2021 businessman Olaksandr Yaroslavsky gained majority shares in the company.

As of 2009 the shareholders having more than 10% include Kazakhstan-based BTA Bank and BTA Securities as well as the Cyprus-based Saleta Limited and Colorino Trading Limited.
