= Mikalay Korbut =

Belarusian politician (1948–2026)

- Мікалай Корбут

Minister of Finance
- In office 1997 – 14 August 2008
- Preceded by: Pavel Dzik
- Succeeded by: Andrei Kharkavets

Personal details
- Born: 1 November 1948 Hutnica, Bobruysk Region, Belarusian SSR, USSR
- Died: January 2026 (aged 77)
- Education: Belarusian State Institute of National Economy
- Occupation: Economist

Mikalay Pyatrovich Korbut (Belarusian: Мікалай Пятровіч Корбут; 1 November 1948 – January 2026) was a Belarusian politician. His graduated from the Belarusian Institute for National Economy. Korbut served as Minister of Finance from 1997 to 2008.

Korbut's death was announced on 19 January 2026. He was 77.
