= Boris Mints Institute =

The Boris Mints Institute at Tel Aviv University is an entity promoting research and planning, founded by Boris Mints.

== History ==
The Boris Mints Institute was established in 2016 at the Gershon H. Gordon Faculty of Social Sciences, and has already held several academic events, conferences, and extended significant support for research projects in food security, renewable energy, and conflict resolution.

The Institute operates five research labs:

- Conflict Resolution Lab
- Inequality Lab
- Renewable Energy Lab
- Sustainable Development Lab
- Water Lab

The Institute runs an annual academic conference, during which policy solutions formulated by researchers are presented. The Institute has collaborated with the Matanel Foundation to support small farmers in Africa by supporting two PhD grants.

== Boris Mints Institute Prize ==
Each year since 2017, the Institute awards the Boris Mints Institute Prize. The $100,000 prize is given to someone who has devoted their research and academic work to finding solutions for global challenges. The prize has been awarded to:

- 2017 - Prof. Jeffrey Sachs
- 2018 - Prof. Michael Kremer
- 2019 - Dr. Peter H. Gleick
- 2020 - Professor Sabina Alkire
