= Beleximgarant =

Belarusian insurance company

- Type: Government-owned corporation
- Industry: Insurance
- Founded: August 7, 1997; 29 years ago
- Founder: Government of Belarus
- Headquarters: Minsk, Belarus
- Area served: Belarus
- Key people: Valery Yermoshka
- Products: Export insurance
- Owner: Belarusian Ministry of Finance
- Website: beg.by

Beleximgarant (Belarusian: Белэксімгарант; Russian: Белэксимгарант) is a Belarusian insurance company founded in 1997 under the name Belgorodzneshstrakh (Belarusian: Белдзяржзнешстрах) dealing with export insurance. It is fully owned by the Belarusian government.

Together with Belgosstrakh, it is one of the leading insurance companies in Belarus. and a legal monopoly in the field of insurance of exports with state support. According to the Belarusian legislation, tourists entering Belarus need to hold a valid insurance policy issued either by Beleximgarant or Belgossrakh. Since January 2024 Valery Yermoshka serves as the company's general director.

== History ==
On August 7, 1997, resolution No. 1036 issued by the Government of Belarus approved the creation of the enterprise "Belgorodzneshstrakh" as a subsidiary of the state company "Belgorodzneshstrakh". On May 23, 2001, the Council of Ministers of Belarus, by Resolution No. 752, subordinated the company to itself and renamed it "Beleximgarant".

On August 25, 2006, president of Belarus Alexander Lukashenko issued a decree No. 534, granted the enterprise the exclusive right to insure exports with state support. In 2010, "Beleximgarant" provided insurance coverage for 57% of export loans. It ranked 6th in Belarus in terms of insurance premiums (62.1 billion rubles; $20.7 million). The share of state-owned enterprises in the total insurance coverage was 86.4%. At the beginning of 2011, it became the 2nd largest insurer in the country in terms of equity (463 billion rubles; $154.3 million) and authorized capital.

By 2012, it provided services to over 8,000 enterprises in the country and was the 4th most profitable insurance company in Belarus. In 2013, payments to insured persons amounted to 13% (59.5 billion rubles) of their contributions (463.4 billion rubles). The share of contributions for export insurance amounted to 21% (99.4 billion rubles).

As of August 4, 2014, the authorized capital of the enterprise amounted to 4060 billion rubles] ($393.4 million). In 2019 the company concluded export risk insurance contracts with the Development Bank of the Republic of Belarus In 2020 Fitch Ratings downgraded the company's rating to negative.

Since 2002, it has been a member of the Prague Club of the Berne Union.

== Directors ==
- Vyacheslav Balibok (January 29, 1998 — 2009)
- Hennadz Mitskevich (December 29, 2009 - 2024)
- Valery Yermoshka (since January 5, 2024)
