= Kizil =

Kizil may refer to:

== People ==
- Bahar Kizil (born 1988), German singer-songwriter

== Places ==
- Kizil Caves, Buddhist rock-cut caves located near Kizil Township
- Kızıl Kule, main tourist attraction in the Turkish city of Alanya
- Kızılırmak River, longest river in Turkey
- Kyzyl, capital of the Tuva Republic in Russia
- Kizil, a former name for Ștefan Vodă city, Moldova

== See also ==
- Battle of Kızıl Tepe
- Kizil massacre
- Kyzyl (disambiguation)
