= Ministry of Finance (Belarus) =

Government ministry of Belarus

Ministry of Finance of the Republic of Belarus
- Міністэрства фінансаў Рэспублікі Беларусь; Министерство финансов Республики Беларусь
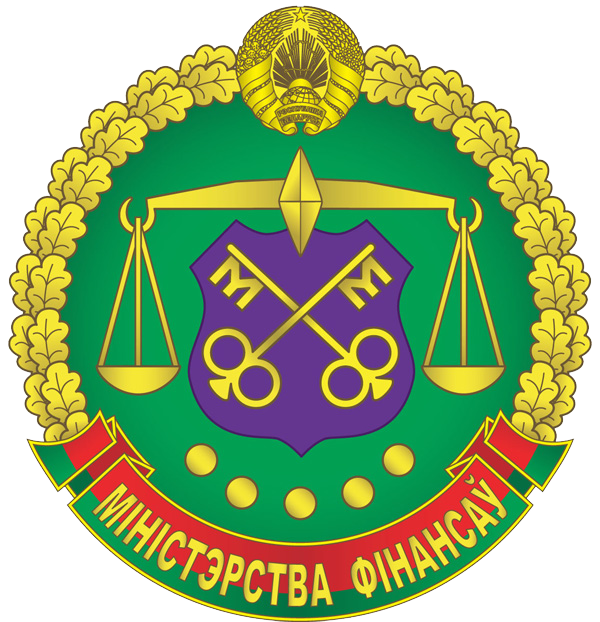
- Emblem of the Ministry

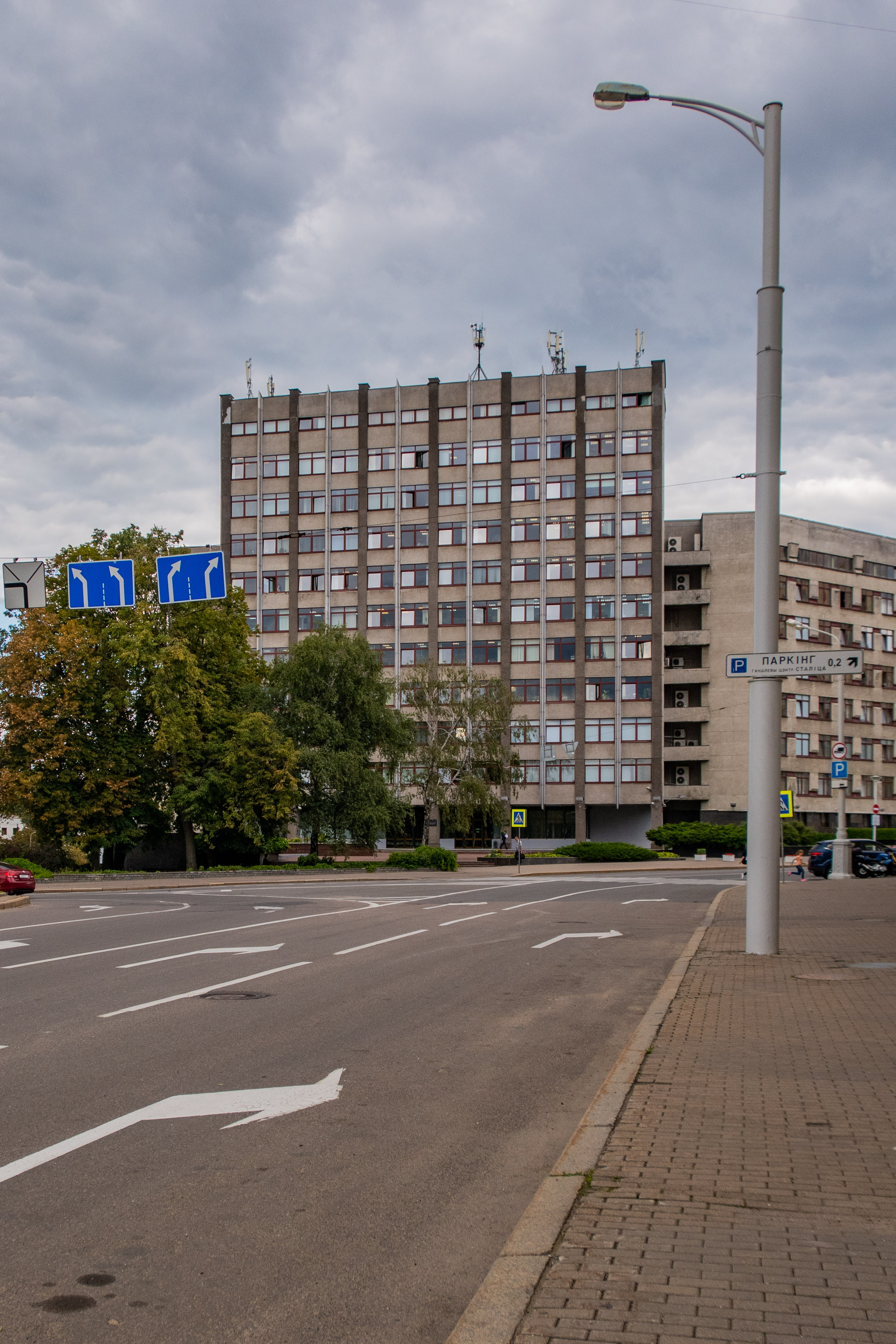
- Ministry headquarters

Agency overview
- Formed: 19 September 1991
- Jurisdiction: Government of Belarus
- Headquarters: 7 Sovetskaya Street, Minsk; 53.895231°N 27.540967°E
- Minister responsible: Yuri Seliverstov
- Child agencies: Belgosstrakh; Beleximgarant
- Website: minfin.gov.by

The Ministry of Finance of the Republic of Belarus (Belarusian: Міністэрства фінансаў Рэспублікі Беларусь, romanized: Ministerstva finansaŭ Respubliki Bielaruś; Russian: Министерство финансов Республики Беларусь) is the Belarusian government ministry which coordinates state financial policy and oversees the regulation of securities in Belarus.

The current Minister of Finance is Yuri Seliverstov.

== History ==
After the fall of the Russian Empire and the February and October revolutions, the financial service was also given a key role in the new power structure, and it inherited a number of functions from the tsarist Ministry of Finance. On January 7, 1919, the Commissariat of Finance was created in the Byelorussian Soviet Socialist Republic, which in February was transformed into the People's Commissariat of Finance (Narkomfin) of the Byelorussian Soviet Socialist Republic. The formation of new, Soviet financial bodies in the BSSR was complicated by difficult political and economic conditions: a series of wars, devastation, collectivization, etc. Due to the repeated occupation of the territory, the financial department of the republic and its employees had to change their location several times in the first years. In March 1919, the People's Commissariat was liquidated, its functions were transferred to the People's Commissariat of Finance of the Lithuanian-Belorussian SSR. The change of people's commissars of finance was also frequent, a number of them subsequently made a successful career at the all-Union level. Unfortunately, the lives of most of the leaders of the Belarusian People's Commissariat of Finance of the pre-war period were tragically cut short in the second half of the 1930s.

In July 1920, the Finance Department of the Minsk Provincial Revolutionary Committee was created. On August 1, it was transformed into the Finance Department of the Military Revolutionary Committee of the BSSR, on August 26 - into the Finance Commissariat of the Military Revolutionary Committee of the BSSR, in December - into the People's Commissariat of Finance of the BSSR. In 1921-1923 (according to other sources, until 1924), the post of People's Commissar of Finance of the BSSR was occupied by the authorized representative of the People's Commissariat of Finance of the RSFSR. In 1924 and 1932, the Regulations on the People's Commissariat of Finance were adopted.

=== BSSR (1941-1991) ===
In June 1941, the People's Commissariat of Finance of the BSSR temporarily ceased operations, but in 1942, an operational group of the People's Commissariat of Finance was created in Moscow, on the basis of which the activities of the People's Commissariat were restored. From December 1943 to July 1944, the People's Commissariat was based in Gomel, after which it returned to Minsk.

On March 26, 1946, the People's Commissariat of Finance was transformed into the Ministry of Finance, and on March 21, 1952, the Regulation on the Ministry of Finance of the BSSR and its local bodies was approved. The union-republican status of the ministry was secured, with subordination to the Council of Ministers of the Byelorussian SSR and the Ministry of Finance of the Soviet Union. In 1954, the Belarusian office of the State Bank of the USSR was separated from the Ministry of Finance of the BSSR. On August 7, 1972, a new Regulation on the Ministry of Finance was approved.

In 1990-1991, the structure of the ministry underwent a number of changes, which was associated with the need to restructure the management of the national economy. Thus, in 1990, the Main State Inspectorate (since 1994, the State Tax Committee of the Republic of Belarus) and state tax inspectorates for regions, cities, districts and city districts were created within the structure of the Ministry of Finance.

In 2006 it was merged with the Securities Committee of the Council of Ministers, which is now a department under the Ministry.

== Ministers of Finance ==
- Stepan Yanchuk, (1991-1994)
- Pawl Dzik, (1995-1997)
- Mikalay Korbut, (1997-2008)
- Andrey Kharkovets, (2008-2014)
- Vladimir Amarin, (2014-2018)
- Maxim Yermalovich, (2018-2020)
- Yury Seliverstov, (since 5 June 2020)
