= Abel Aganbegyan =

Leading Soviet and Russian economist (born 1932)

- Абел Аганбегян
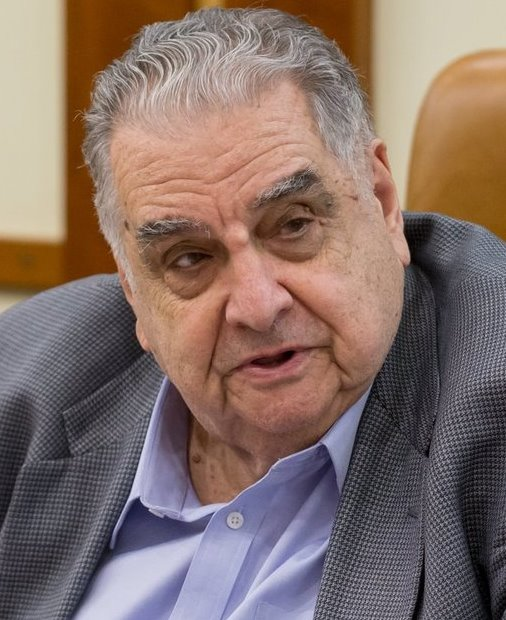
- Aganbegyan in 2018
- Born: 8 October 1932 (age 94); Tbilisi, Transcaucasian Socialist Federative Soviet Republic, Soviet Union (now Georgia)
- Occupation: Economist

Academic background
- Education: Moscow State University

Academic work
- Notable works: Economic reforms during Perestroika
- Awards: Order of the Red Banner of Labour; Order of Honour (Russia); Order of Friendship (Russia)

Abel Gezevich Aganbegyan (Armenian: Աբել Գյոզի Աղանբեկյան, romanized: Abel Gyozi Aghanbekyan; Russian: Абе́л Ге́зевич Аганбегя́н; born 8 October 1932) is a leading Soviet and Russian economist of Armenian descent, a full member of the Russian Academy of Sciences and an honorary doctor of business administration of Kingston University, the founder and first editor of the journal EKO.

== Biography ==
Aganbegyan was born on 8 October 1932 in Tiflis, Soviet Union (now Tbilisi, Georgia), the son of a senior CPSU official. Upon graduating from the Moscow State Economical Institute in 1956 he was employed by the Soviet government structure responsible for salary policy in the USSR. In 1961 he left the official work and started his scientific career. He became an employee of a new scientific institute in Novosibirsk which was quickly filled by young and ambitious persons from Moscow. An active member of the group of mathematical economists which emerged in the USSR in the 1960s, Aganbegyan became an Academy member in 1963 (full member in 1974) and the head of the institute in 1964. He was just 32 years old and had only one published book.

In the late 1980s he was one of Mikhail Gorbachev's chief economic advisers and among the first Soviet economists to voice the need for a restructuring of the economic and business infrastructure of the Soviet Union. His ideas were presented in a number of ideological books on perestroika. He also supported the movement for the reunion of Nagorno-Karabakh with Armenia.

From 1989 to 2002 he was the rector of the Academy of National Economy under the Government of the Russian Federation. He is a foreign member of the Bulgarian and the Hungarian Academies of Sciences, a corresponding member of the British Academy.

He is the father of Ruben Aganbegyan as well as Ekaterina Kouprianova.

On 26 June 2023, in an interview titled "There is no money, but there is plenty of it". He spoke of solutions to combat poverty to the Arguments and Facts newspaper, the main economic indicators of Russia, and how to improve the economy and the standard of living of Russians.

== Awards ==
- Soviet Union
  - Order of Lenin
  - Order of the Red Banner of Labour (two)
  - Medal "For Valiant Labor. To commemorate the 100th anniversary of the birth of Vladimir Ilyich Lenin"
- Russia
  - Order of Alexander Nevsky
  - Order of Friendship
  - Medal "In Commemoration of the 850th Anniversary of Moscow"

== Books ==
Aganbegyan is the author of more than 250 peer-reviewed publications and 20 monographs.

- Abel Aganbegyan, "Moving The Mountain Inside the Perestroika Revolution", Bantam Press 0593018184, 1989.
- Economics in a Changing World: System Transformation, Eastern and Western Assessments Volume 1-3, by Aganbegyan, Abel; Bogomolov, Oleg & Kaser, Michael, 1989.
- Economic Challenge of Perestroika, by Aganbegyan, Abel, Macmillan Press, London, 1994 ISBN 978-0-333-60123-5
