= Maxim Yermalovich =

Belarusian politician (born 1977)

- Максим Ермолович
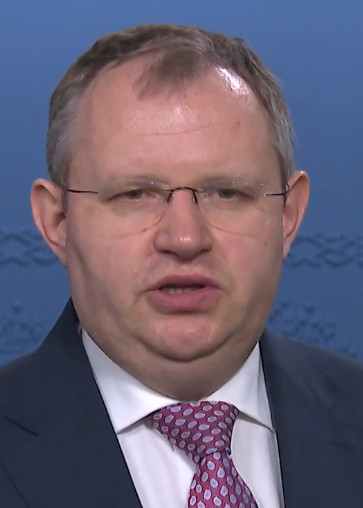
- Yermalovich in 2020

Ambassador of Belarus to the United Kingdom
- In office 21 August 2020 – 31 July 2022
- President: Alexander Lukashenko
- Prime Minister: Roman Golovchenko
- Preceded by: Sergei Aleinik

Minister of Finance
- In office 31 August 2018 – 3 June 2020
- President: Alexander Lukashenko
- Prime Minister: Syarhey Rumas
- Preceded by: Vladimir Amarin
- Succeeded by: Yury Seliverstov

Personal details
- Born: 26 June 1977 (age 49)

Maxim Leonidovich Yermalovich (Russian: Максим Леонидович Ермолович; born 26 June 1977) is a Belarusian politician serving as minister for competition and antitrust regulation of the Eurasian Economic Commission since 2024. From 2020 to 2022, he served as ambassador of Belarus to the United Kingdom. From 2018 to 2020, he served as minister of finance.
