= Varvara mine =

Gold mine in Kazakhstan

- Location: Kostanay Region, Kazakhstan
- Products: Gold

The Varvara mine is one of the largest gold mines in Kazakhstan and in the world. The mine is located in Kostanay Region. The mine has estimated reserves of 5.2 million oz of gold.
