= Soft water path =

The concept of the soft path was first used for energy resource management and was developed by Amory Lovins shortly after the shock of the 1973 energy crisis in the United States. This concept has now been refined and applied to water, most notably by water experts Peter Gleick and David Brooks. The soft path is often framed as a more integrated and effective alternative to supply-side water resource management. Supply-side water management focuses on meeting demands for water through centralized, large-scale physical infrastructure, and centralized water management systems. In the 20th century, this approach focused on constructing bigger dams and drilling deeper wells to access more water to meet projected demands of consumers. More recently, a focus on demand-side management has emerged in regions where water supply is increasingly constrained (see, for example, Peak water), and it focuses on managing demand and making current practices more efficient. The soft path integrates both supply and demand concepts but in a broader context by recognizing that water is a means to satisfy demands for goods and services and asking how much water, of what qualities, is actually required to satisfy those demands efficiently and sustainably. Soft path water planning also requires broader institutional approaches to water management including the application of smart economics, the potential for distributed rather than centralized water systems, and more democratic participation in water policy decisions. Others have described the soft path as "unleashing the full potential of demand-side management.",

== Publications ==
- The Soft Path for Water iPacific Instituten a Nutshell. 2005. Oliver M Brandes and David B Brooks. Friends of the Earth and POLIS Project on Ecological Governance. University of Victoria, Victoria, BC.
- G. Wolff and P.H. Gleick, "The Soft Path for Water" in The World's Water 2002-2003 (Island Press, Washington D.C., pp. 1-32.
- P.H. Gleick, 2003. Science, Volume 302, November 28, 2003, pp. 1524-1528.
- P.H. Gleick, 2002. Nature, Volume 418, pg. 373, July 25, 2002.
- Manitoba Water Soft Path 2006.
- The Energy Controversy: Soft Path Questions and Answers (1979) ISBN 978-0-913890-22-6
- A New Path to Water Sustainability for the Town of Oliver, BC - Soft Path Case Study by Oliver M Brandes Tony Maas Adam Mjolsness Ellen Reynolds. Uvic Printers. Feb 2008.

== See also ==
- Soft energy path
- Backcasting
- Ecological governance
