= Kyzyl mine =

- Location: East Kazakhstan Province, Kazakhstan
- Products: Gold

The Kyzyl mine is one of the largest gold mines in Kazakhstan and in the world. The mine is located in the east of the country in East Kazakhstan Province. The mine has estimated reserves of 10.37 million oz of gold.
