= Ruben Aganbegyan =

Russian economist

- Ռուբեն Աղանբեկյան
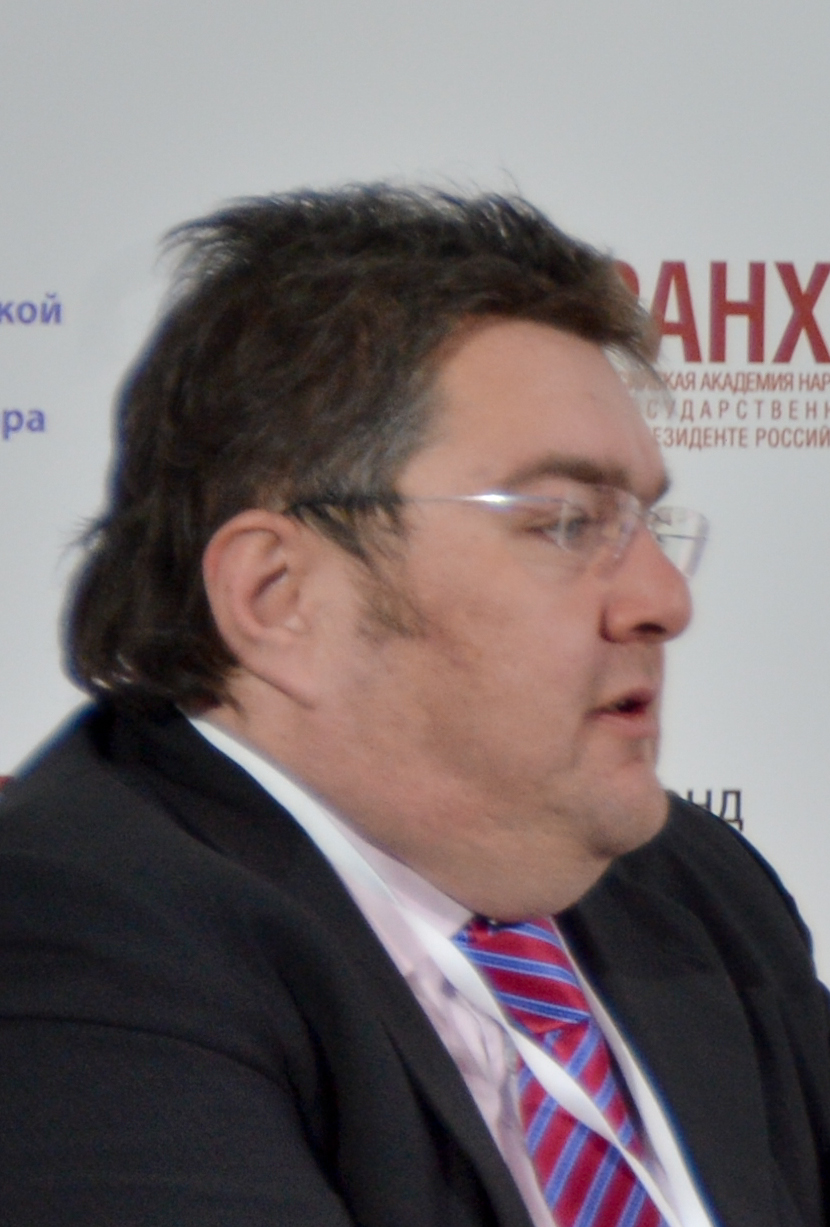
- Aganbegyan in 2014
- Born: 1972 (age 53–54); Novosibirsk, Russian SFSR, Soviet Union
- Education: Moscow State Law Academy
- Occupations: Economist, financier
- Known for: President of Renaissance Capital (2009–2010); President of the Moscow Interbank Currency Exchange (2010–2011); President of Otkritie Holding
- Parent: Abel Aganbegyan (father)

Ruben Aganbegyan (Armenian: Ռուբեն Աղանբեկյան; born 1972 in Novosibirsk) is a Russian economist.

== Life and career ==
He is the son of well-known economist Abel Aganbegyan.

Aganbegyan graduated from Moscow State Law Academy. In the 1990s and 2000s he worked in PricewaterhouseCoopers, Clifford Chance, Credit Suisse First Boston and Troika Dialog. In 2009 he became the president of Renaissance Capital, and in 2010 became president of the now-defunct Moscow Interbank Currency Exchange. He is also a former president of Otkritie Holding, which went bankrupt in 2022.
