= Otkritie FC Bank =

Russian bank

Bank Otkritie Financial Corporation

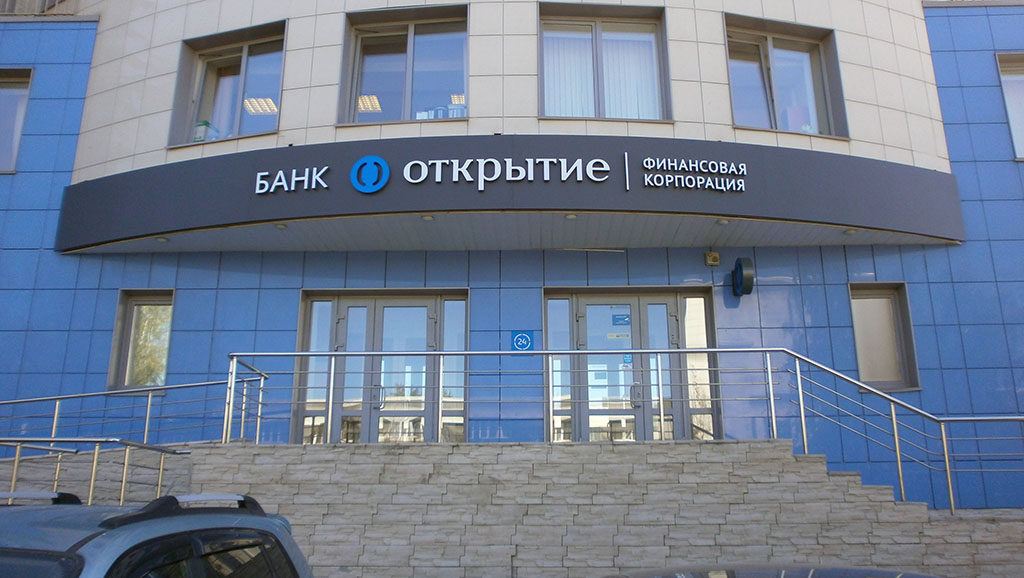
- Otkritie FC Bank office in Perm
- Native name: ПАО Банк «Финансовая Корпорация Открытие» (Банк «ФК Открытие»)
- Formerly: NOMOS-Bank
- Type: Public Joint-Stock Company
- Traded as: LSE: OFCB, MCX: OFCB
- Industry: Banking
- Founded: December 15, 1992; 33 years ago
- Defunct: 1 January 2025
- Headquarters: Moscow, Russia
- Key people: Mikhail Alekseev (CEO)
- Services: Financial services
- Revenue: $3.76 billion (2017)
- Operating income: $758 million (2016)
- Net income: $22.4 million (2016)
- Total assets: $40.3 billion (2016)
- Total equity: $3.46 billion (2016)
- Owner: VTB Bank
- Rating: Ba3 (Moody's), BB− (S&P) (2017)
- Website: open.ru

PJSC "Bank Otkritie Financial Corporation" or Otkritie FC Bank (Russian: Банк «ФК Открытие», translates as opening or discovery) was one of Russia's largest full-service commercial banks. It had more than 440 offices of different formats in Russia. It was co-founded by Igor Finogenov, now CEO of the Eurasian Development Bank.

Otkritie Bank was ranked 1st among privately owned banks and 4th by assets among banking groups in Russia. In August 2017, Otkritie was bailed out by the Central Bank of Russia, at a cost to the state of over $8 billion. The central bank later described Otkritie's capital as "largely fictitious". Effective January 1, 2025, the bank has been completely dissolved as an independent entity by VTB Group and closed due to its reorganization.

== History ==
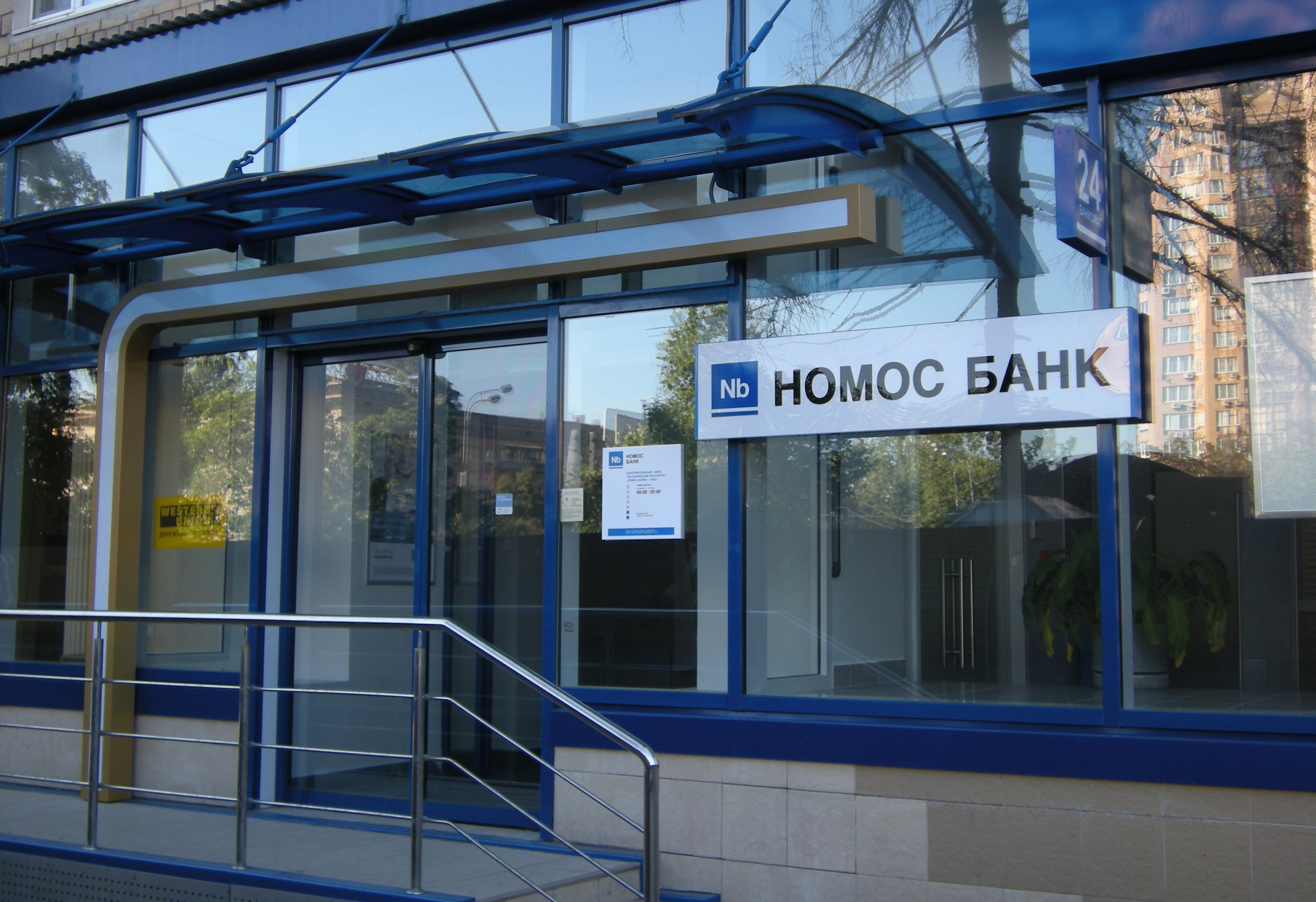
Nomos bank office in Moscow

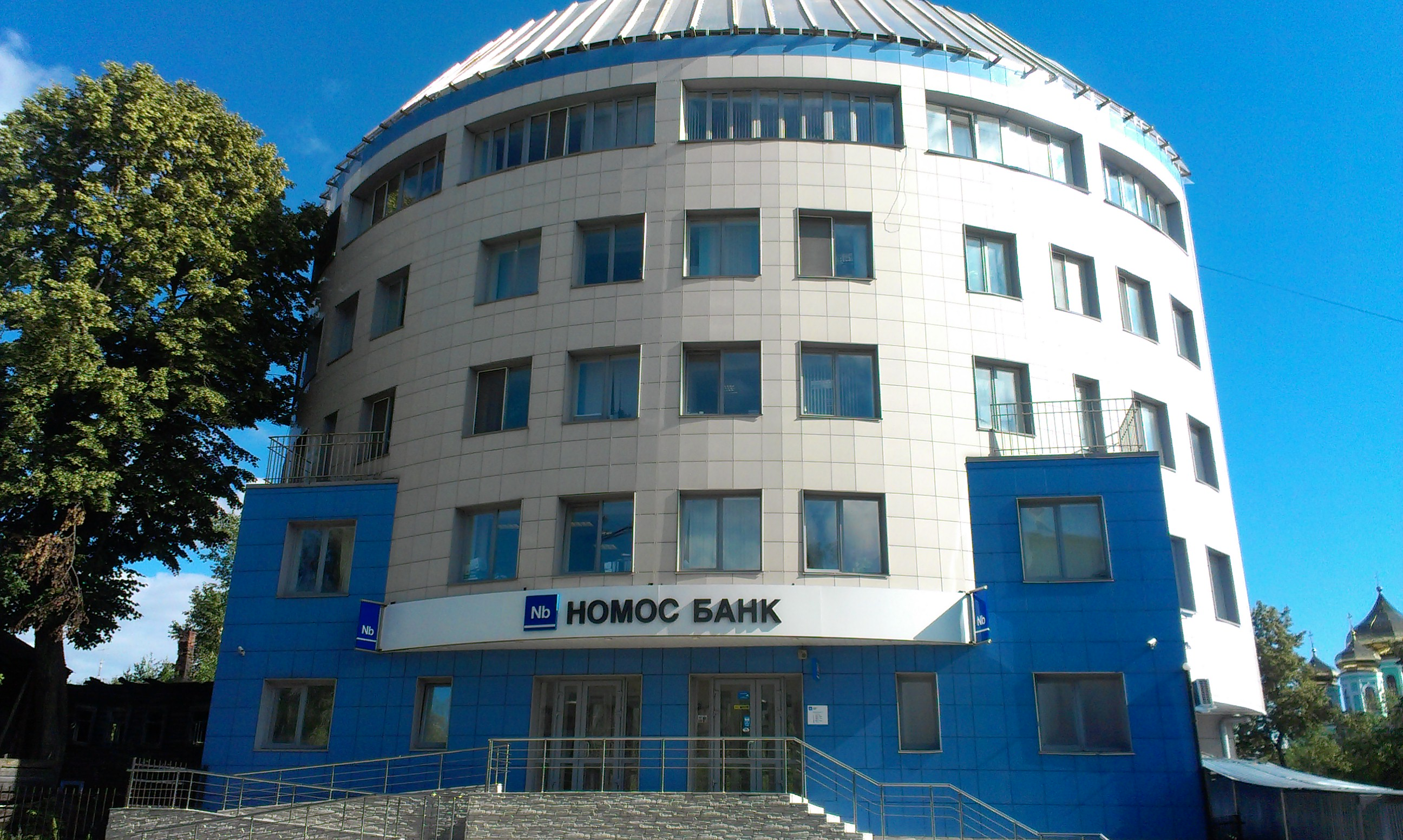
Nomos bank office in Perm

The lending institution was registered as TIPCO Venture Bank (Russian: ТИПКО Венчур Банк) in 1992. The bank was renamed in 1994 as joint stock investment commercial bank Novaya Moskva (Russian: Новая Москва, Russian for New Moscow), and Nomos-Bank (Russian: Номос-Банк) in 2007. ICT Group (Alexander Nesis is a co-owner) gathered a controlling stake in the bank in May 2006.

=== Otkritie Holding ===
In 2012, Otkritie took over NOMOS-Bank, using a $1bn loan from VTB Bank.

In 2014, NOMOS-Bank was renamed to Otkritie Financial Corporation Bank.

In 201,4 the Bank of Russia picked Bank FC Otkritie to rescue National Bank Trust.

Otkritie allegedly became Russia's largest private bank in late 2014 by buying 625 billion rubles in bonds from the state oil company Rosneft, using them as collateral to obtain reverse repo loans from the Central Bank of Russia, then passing on the dollars it received to Rosneft, which is not allowed access to international capital markets due to international sanctions. As repo funding had a 2.5% interest rate and the bond had a 7.5% coupon, Otkritie made billions from the trade.

In 2015, all in all, Otkritie Holding's banks lay claims to get a big share of government aid among all private banks (Rub 65.2 bln or 7.8% of the government program).

=== Acquisitions ===
In 2016, Financial group has completed the legal takeover of Khanty-Mansiysk Otkritie Bank by Otkritie FC Bank. As the financial group's press service reported, the merged bank would hold total assets of Rub 3.1 tln.

In December 2016, Otkritie Group and Rosgosstrakh Group (Russia's largest insurance company) agreed to merge.

=== Outflow of liquidity ===
Otkritie experienced a significant outflow of liquidity in July 2017, after it was assigned a BBB− rating by ACRA. According to the Financial Times, senior managers of Otkritie have removed their personal funds from the bank. By late August Oktrikie shares had fallen to a 20-month low.

On 29 August 2017, the Central Bank of Russia announced it would take over administration of Otkritie.

In August 2021, the Central Bank of Russia announced the launch of preparations for the sale of Otkritie FC Bank, as well as the dates for accepting applications from potential shareholders from 11 to 22 October of the same year. The regulator is studying options to sell Otkritie FC Bank shares through organized listing and alternate ways for selling its shares to a strategic investor.

== Links to VTB Bank ==
The state-owned VTB Bank had a 10% stake in Otkritie's parent company, later written off after the 2017 bailout. In 2018, it was revealed that Otkritie had amassed an undisclosed 20% stake in VTB Bank, making it the bank's largest shareholder after the Russian government. Otkritie's rapid rise had been aided by cheap loans from VTB.

The purchase of VTB stock cost Otkritie tens of billions of rubles, but helped boost VTB's stock price, which had lagged behind its domestic competitors. The stake in VTB was spread between Otkritie's various subsidiaries to avoid reaching the 5% threshold for mandatory holdings disclosure.

In December 2022, the Bank of Russia withdrew from the capital of Otkritie Bank, 100% of the shares were transferred to VTB.

== Ownership ==
- Bank of Russia (99.00% as of December 2017)

Before the bailout, owners included the Czech PPF Group (29.9%) owned by Petr Kellner, the Slovak businessman Roman Korbačka (20%), and the Russian ICT Group (50.1%) of which Alexander Nesis is President.

=== Lawsuit ===
Although Boris Mints, co-founder of the bank, had sold his shares in the bank in 2013, he allegedly still had a relationship with Otkritie. In a lawsuit in the High Court of the UK, the central bank alleged that Mints' company, O1, had sold bonds to the banks as a "fraudulent scheme" to pay off its debt just days before the collapse, according to a Financial Times report. An earlier report in February 2019 had stated that the banks were alleged to have sustained "losses from purchasing large amounts of O1 and Otkritie Holding assets".

In June 2018, Russia petitioned the UK court to freeze £470 million of Mints' assets, including a mansion in Perthshire, Scotland, known as the Tower of Lethendy. The court agreed only to an injunction prohibiting Mints and his three sons from disposing of assets, including the mansion. The Tower of Lethendy is only one of 140 of Mints' properties that the banks were attempting to confiscate. Ownership documents indicate that the mansion is owned by MFT Braveheart Ltd, a company registered in the Cayman Islands. According to the FT report, "Mr Mints and his sons deny committing fraud and are contesting the allegations in arbitration proceedings scheduled to be heard next April in London".

== Sanctions ==
On 24 February 2022, the U.S. Department of the Treasury’s Office of Foreign Assets Control (OFAC) sanctioned Otkritie FC Bank under E.O. 14024 for being owned or controlled by, or for having acted or purported to act for or on behalf of, directly or indirectly, the GoR, and for operating or having operated in the financial services sector of the Russian Federation economy. Subsidiary companies were also sanctioned. The UK first imposed an asset freeze sanction on 28 March 2022, increased in March 2023 to include trust services and in December 2023 increased them again to include a prohibition on correspondent banking relationships.

== Management Board ==
Mikhail Alekseyev has been the Board's Chairman since 1 January 2023.

== Currency exchange ==
In 2014, the bank offered a service called Client Bank, an online currency conversion service. Corporate customers can use Client Bank to exchange currency online.

On 21 October 2013, NOMOS-BANK has been admitted to trading on the Moscow Exchange.
