= Rosgosstrakh =

Russian insurance company

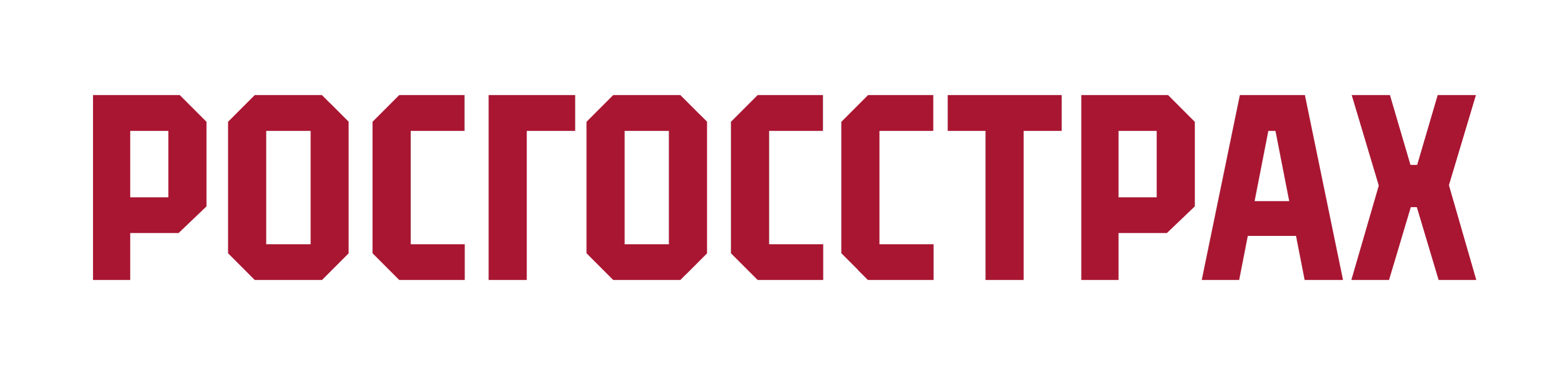

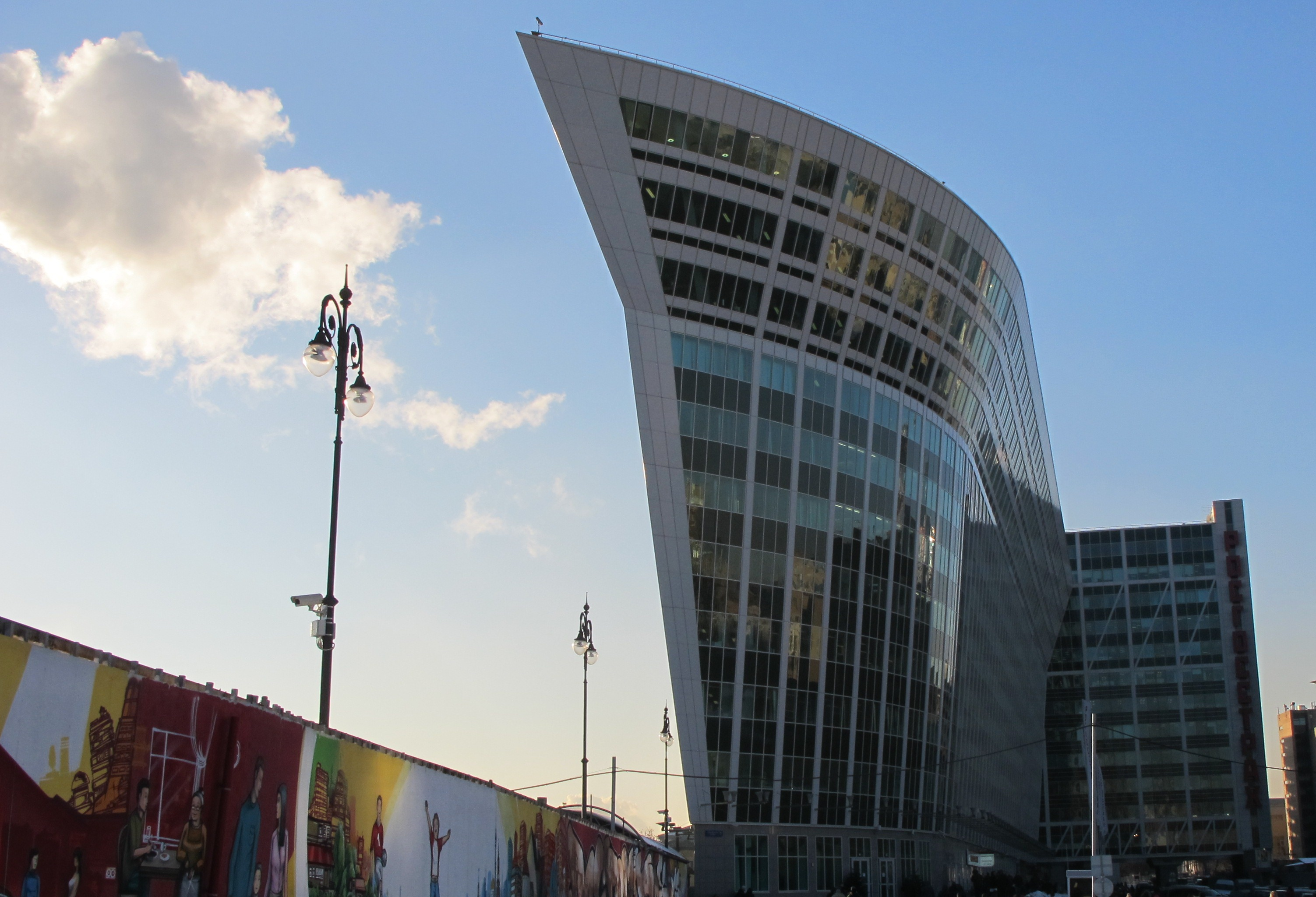
- Head office of "Rosgosstrakh" in Moscow
- Type: Open joint-stock company
- Traded as: MCX: RGSS
- Industry: Insurance
- Predecessor: Gosstrakh USSR
- Founded: 1992; 34 years ago
- Founder: Government of Russia
- Headquarters: Moscow, Russia
- Area served: Russia
- Revenue: 60,554,900,000 Russian ruble (2017)
- Website: rgs.ru

Rosgosstrakh (Russian: Росгосстрах) is a Russian insurance company. It was the largest insurance company in Russia for many years but as of 2016 it became the second largest, behind SOGAZ.

Rosgosstrakh was the main sponsor of the Russian National Football Championship.

As Russia began its 2022 invasion of Ukraine, Rosgosstrakh was sanctioned by the US on 24 February 2022.

== History ==
Rosgosstrakh is the successor of Gosstrakh USSR, which was founded in 1921 during the Russian Soviet Federative Socialist Republic. Gosstrakh was the Russian government-owned insurance monopoly until 1947, when Ingosstrakh was established as agency of foreign insurance. Rosgosstrakh became a state-owned joint stock company on 10 February 10 1992 by the Government Resolution of the Russian Cabinet №76 "On the establishment of the Russian State Insurance Company".

In July 2003, the controlling stake of 78%, minus four shares, was privatized. As of 2006, Rosgosstrakh was Russia's largest insurance company with US$1,528 billion in premiums per the Russian Federal Insurance Oversight Service (FIOS), a.k.a. Federal Service for Insurance Supervision (FSIS) or by the Russian acronym FSSN, the All-Russian Insurance Association (ARIA), Interfax, and public websites of the 20 leading Russian insurance companies. During 2007 and 2008 Rosgosstrakh bought the insurance company arm of the IFD Kapital Financial Group, consisting of Kapital Insurance, Kapital Reinsurance, Kapital Health Insurance and Kapital Life Insurance. They continue to do business under the name "Capital". On January 1, 2010 Rosgosstrakh restructured its ten regional insurance companies into the unified federal company "Group Rosgosstrakh".

Up until September 2010, Rosgosstrakh was the only insurance company with government shares. At that time the Russian government sold the remaining 13.1% stake in the company and hence lost its power, the golden share.

In 2018 Rosgosstrakh acquired Ergo Life, a Russian-based subsidiary of German insurance company Munich Re.
