= Tower of Lethendy =

17th-century L-plan tower house in Scotland

Coordinates: 56.5594°N 3.3999°W

Tower of Lethendy is a 17th-century L-plan tower house, about 3.5 miles (5.6 km) south west of Blairgowrie, Perth and Kinross, Scotland, and about 0.5 miles (0.8 km) east of Kirkton of Lethendy.

The property may also be known as Lethendy House or Lethendy Tower.

== History ==
The property was owned by the Herons.

There is a castellated mansion designed by Andrew Heiton, dated 1884.

== Structure ==
The tower house, of three storeys and a garrett has been greatly altered. The entrance, which is now enclosed by a modern building, is defended by a gunloop. The vaulted basement has a kitchen in it. There is a turnpike stair in the wing, above a pit-prison. The measurements of the L-plan tower are 11.3 metres (37 ft) (from east to west) by 7 metres (23 ft), with the wing being 12 metres (39 ft) (from north to south) by 5 metres (16 ft).

A 10th century Picto-Scottish slab carved in relief with an angel, clerics, musicians and a dog, which may well have stood in a nearby field until it was used to repair the staircase, {perhaps in 1678} is used as a lintel on the first flight of the staircase from the ground floor to the mezzanine.

== See also ==
- Castles in Great Britain and Ireland
- List of castles in Scotland
