= Titran-Express =

Coordinates: 59.61244°N 33.49333°E

Titran-Express (Russian: Титран-Экспресс) is a company based in Tikhvin in Leningrad Oblast, Russia. Throughout the plants history it has been associated with metal mechanical engineering, and manufacture of components for large-scale transportation equipment such as bogies for rail vehicles, tank tracks or tractor parts.

In 1963 the Centrolit (Центролит) casting plant was founded, further developments in the 1960s included a subsidiary supply factory of the Kirov factory; both concerns were merged as a subsidiary of the Kirov plant in the 1970s.

The company was privatised as JSC Transmash in 1993; after financial difficulties and severe jobs losses in the post-Soviet era, the whole site was acquired by the ICT Group in 2001, renamed Titran and redeveloped. Poor demand led to an end to tractor production in 2003.

The plant is collocated on the same industrial site as the Tikhvin Ferroalloy Plant (operational 2007) and the Tikhvin Freight Car Building Plant (opened 2012).

== History ==
=== 1963–2000 ===
An industrial plant was constructed in Tikhvin in the 1960s, an example of large-scale soviet projects of the time. Construction led to a substantial expansion of the town, with an influx of workers requiring the construction of new housing estates. The population of Tikhvin was expected to rise from about 20000 to ~50000 by 1970 according to the architects of the development.

In 1967 the first casting was made, starting production at the site which continued for another 30 years; in 1968 another factory was constructed at the site as a branch of the St. Petersburg Kirov Plant (Putilov factory) producing parts. In 1973 'Centrolit', the Kirov subsidiary, and Litprom were merged, becoming the Tikhvin branch of the Kirov works. In 1974 production of parts for the К-700Т tractor began.

In 1993 the entity was privatised as a closed corporation as the Transmash plant, and began production of railway parts; the Tikhvin plant produced ferrous and ferrous alloy castings, machinery, and rail transportation equipment and spare parts. In 1995 the complex employed over 22,000, a third of the Tkhvin population.

In the mid-1990s the plant was involved in the production of the prototypes of the indigenous Russian high-speed trainset "Sokol" (VSM-250), and was expected to manufacture the main series. Funding for the project was withdrawn in 2002.

After the collapse of the Soviet Union the plant was negatively affected, Reduced federal budgets and the inability to quickly change production to new products were both factors in the plants economic crisis. From 1998 to 1999 production fell by 25%; only production of rail vehicle parts was increased, jobs losses of 2000 had reduced the number of employees to 6000 in 1999; a plan to reorganise the entity's structure was not initially successful, and bankruptcy proceedings began in 2000.

=== Titran (2002-) ===
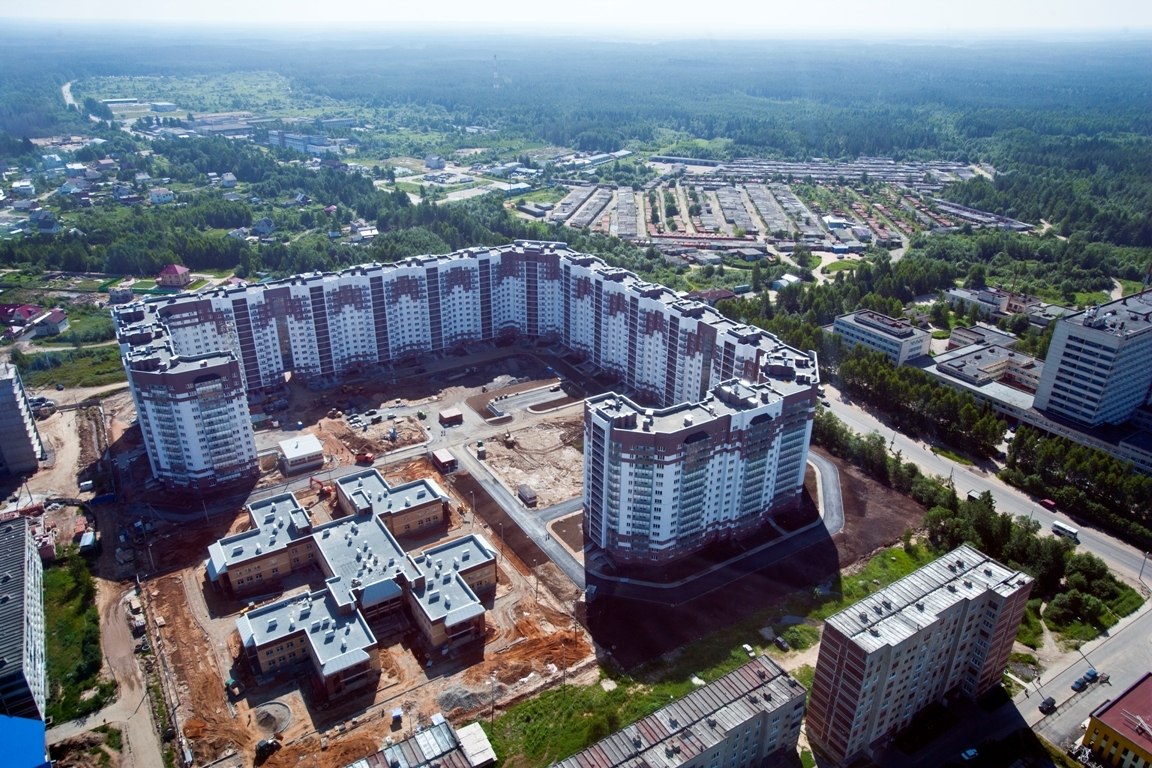
New housing development by ICT Group in Tikhvin for workers (2010). Source: ICT Group

In 2001 the assets of Transmash in Tikhvin were acquired by the ICT Group

The Titran (formerly 'Transmash') plant dated to the developments in the 1960s; it was acquired by ICT Group in 2001, and renamed in 2002. The Titran entity consisted of five subsidiary companies: JSC Titran-Centrolit (ЗАО Титран-Центролит), JSC Titran-Express, JSC Titran-Medokon, (ЗАО Титран-Медекон) and JSC Titran-Hammer (ЗАО Титран-Молот) and the 'Titran Tractor Works' (ЗАО «Тихвинский тракторный завод «Титран – Вепс» or ЗАО «ТЗТМ «Титран»). Combined facilities included manufacture of rail vehicle parts, caterpillar tracks, and tractor and tractor parts, as well as casting, forging, and other metal engineering. Before privatisation the plant had supplied 60% of its output to the Kirov Plant in Leningrad.

In 2002 Титран – Вепс began production of tractors type К-700Т. Although investment was made into the enterprise, the plants economic problems continued in 2003 – turnover was only $20million compared to $750million in the soviet period – with only 30% of the plant area actively utilised, job losses of over 800 were made from January to September; the enterprise made a significant loss in 2003 and a lack of demand for agricultural tractors caused the company to refocus on railway vehicle equipment as part of a three-year restructuring and modernisation plan – tractor production ceased in 2003.

2000 workers were laid off in June 2004, by 2005 the number of full-time employees remaining was reduced to 1000.

The Titran-Express (Титран-Экспресс) factory was restructured and modernised between 2007 and 2008, with manufacturing re-focused on rail vehicle components and caterpillar tracks. As of 2012 the factory produces tank tracks, bogies for electric trains and freight wagons, other railway vehicle components, and welded structures.

In 2016 United Wagon Company (ICT Group subsidiary) became the sole owner of Titran-Express.
