= ICT Group (Russia) =

ICT Group Группа ИСТ
- Type: Private
- Industry: Private equity, financial services, precious metals and mining, heavy engineering and logistics, Construction, industrial development
- Founded: 1991
- Founder: Alexander Nesis
- Headquarters: Moscow, Russia
- Website: www.ict-group.ru

The ICT Group (Russian: Группа ИСТ), also spelt IST Group, was an investment venture based and operated in Russia from 1991 until 2013.

The ICT ('Investments, Construction, Technologies') Group, founded by Alexander Nesis and his partners in the early 1990s, for years used to be one of the largest privately owned investment and industrial companies in Russia. It was headquartered in Moscow and in St. Petersburg. It invested in, developed and managed assets in wide range of industries, including the banking and financial industry, metals and mining, precious metal production, heavy engineering, logistics, construction and development.

The portfolio of assets under the Group's management included NOMOS-BANK, Khanty-Mansi Bank, Polymetal and United Wagon Company. From 2010 till 2013 the Group also held large equity stakes in the potash producer Uralkali and Baltic Leasing. The group's assets were located primarily in Russia, but it also had interests in Kazakhstan and developing markets. In 2013 ICT Group (Russia) ceased its operations. Following the restructuring of assets a new private equity firm ICT Holding Ltd (Cyprus) was founded. The company focuses on equity and venture investments in international public companies from the following industries: energy, metals and mining, autos and transportation, medtech.

Key shareholder of the ICT Holding Ltd is Alexander Nesis.

== Overview ==
ICT was founded as group of private investors by Alexander Nesis and five other colleagues. Nesis was president and major shareholder of the group until 2013.

=== Finance ===
The group established NOMOS-BANK in 1993, a 49.99% stake was sold to the Czech PPF Group and the Slovakian J&T in 2007/8. Khanty–Mansi Bank, an investment bank operating in the Khanty–Mansi Autonomous Area came under the groups control in 2009. In 2011 ICT Group completed an IPO at MICEX and LSE having offered 22% in NOMOS BANK's share capital In 2013 a controlling stake of NOMOS BANK Group was sold to Otkritie Financial Corporation.

The company acquired a stake in road vehicle and industrial equipment leasing company Balting Leasing Company in 2010, and sold it in 2012, a rail wagon leasing company "Rail1520" (ООО «Рейл1520») was formed in 2011 which received financial backing by Sberbank, a rail leasing joint venture with Mitsui was formed in 2012. Both companies were operating under the management of United Wagon Company.

=== Mining and extraction ===
Precious metal extraction company Polymetal was founded by the group in 1998, sold in 2005, and a controlling stake reacquired by ICT group together with Alexander Mamut and PPF Group in 2008. The ICT group increased its shareholding to 40% in 2009. In 2011 Polymetal completed IPO at LSE, as a result, free-float exceeded 50%.

In 2010 ICT group acquired a 13.2% stake in potash mining company Uralkali. In 2013 ICT Group sold its stake in Uralkali to a strategic investor.

=== Engineering ===
In 2001 the group acquired an engineering plant specialising in rail vehicle component and tank track manufacture based in Tikhvin, Leningrad Oblast, Russia. The ICT owned Titran-Express Assembly Plant (Титран-Экспресс) was formed.

ICM (Инвестиции Строительство Менеджмент Investment Construction Management) was founded as a joint venture in 2006 with Israeli civil and manufacturing engineering company Baran Group (in which ICT also acquired a 22% stake, 2006) to provide engineering services to the group.

In 2008 the group began construction of a rail wagon manufacturing plant Tikhvin Railway Car Building Plant (Тихвинский вагоностроительный завод TVSZ), at its Tikhvin manufacturing site, the plant, representing an investment of over $1billion (36billion rubles), became operational in 2012. TVSZ was managed by United Wagon Company. In 2015 United Wagon Company has completed an IPO at Moscow Exchange, the free-float exceeded 12%. By 2019 ICT completely exited from the asset by selling stakes of shares to the financial and strategic investors.

=== Other ===
The company were also involved in real-estate development in Moscow and St. Petersburg, as well as at the former Transmash site in Tikhvin.

In 2011 The group became majority shareholder in Italian national wireless communication company ARIA S.p.A. which later merged with Tiscali S.p.A.

ICT Group also owned 22.35% stake of a private equity fund EMMA Delta, which acquired 33% stake of OPAP, the Greeklottery. In 2015 the stake held by ICT was sold to KKCG, another investor of EMMA Delta.

=== Former investments ===
ICT acquired shares in Alexander Nesis's former employer "Baltic shipyards" (Baltiyskiy Zavod) in 1999 (15%) and 2000 (raised to 50%+1). (Nesis was also director of the plant from 1993 to 1997). ICT's stake in Baltic Shipyards was sold for ~$1billion by 2005.

In 2001 the group acquired a majority stake in the development company for the Tikhvin Ferroalloy Plant. The company was merged into vertically integrated ferroalloy producer Oriel Resources in 2006, and was sold to the Mechel Group in 2008 (re-sold to Yildirim Group in 2013).
