= John Sykes (disambiguation) =

John Sykes (1959–2025) was an English rock guitarist, vocalist and songwriter.

John Sykes may also refer to:

- John Sykes (composer) (1909–1962), composer and music teacher
- John Sykes (politician) (born 1956), British Conservative Member of Parliament for Scarborough, 1992–1997
- John H. Sykes, American businessman in Tampa Bay
- John Sykes (American businessman) (born 1955), co-founder of MTV, president of Entertainment Enterprises for Clear Channel Media Holdings
- John Sykes (footballer) (born 1950), English footballer
- John Sykes (American football) (born 1949), American football running back
