= Trams in Nizhny Novgorod =

Russian tram network

Trams in Nizhny Novgorod Trams in Gorky (1932-1990)

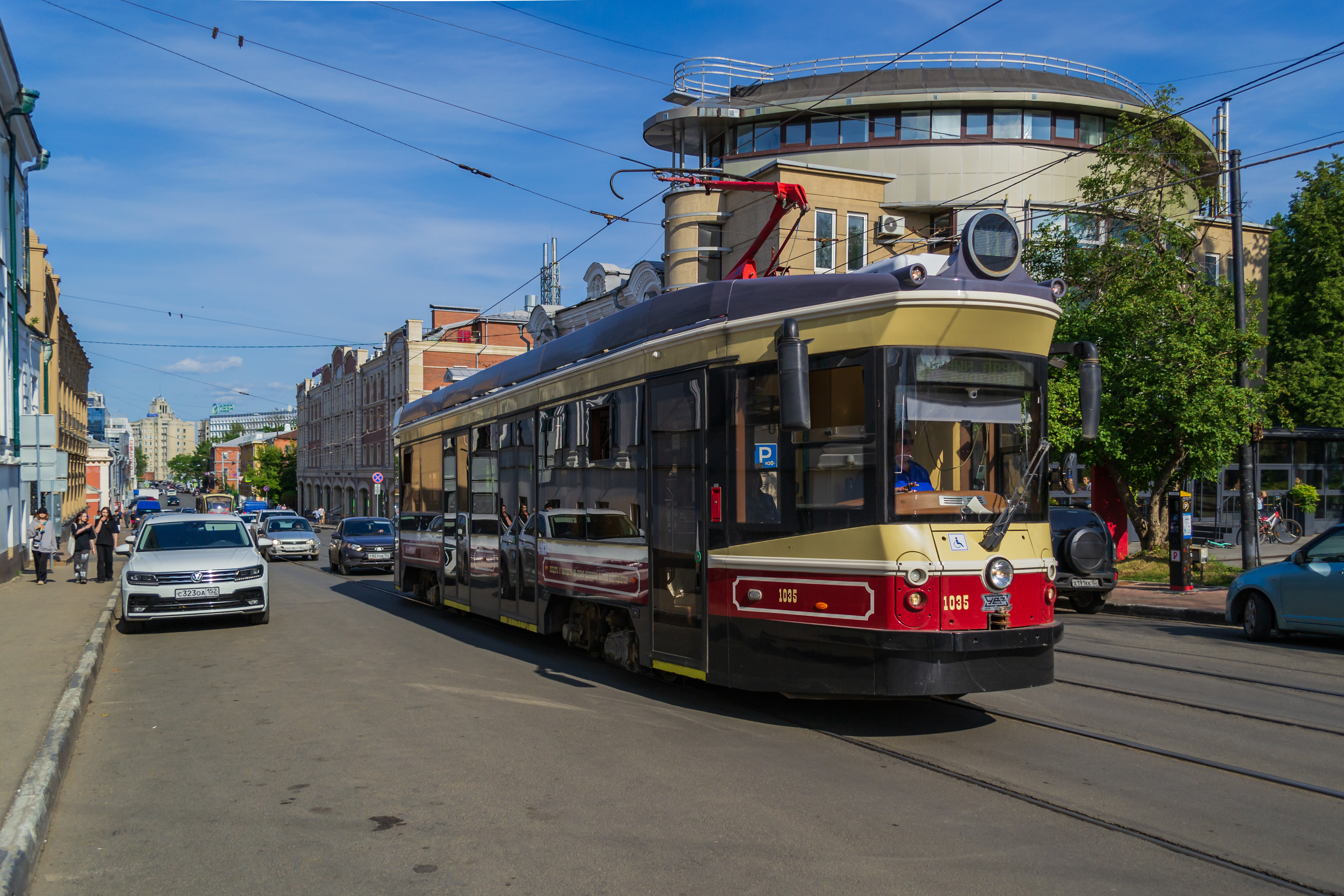
- Tram 71-415R № 1035 stylized like historical

Overview
- Locale: Nizhny Novgorod, Nizhny Novgorod Oblast, Russia
- Transit type: Tram line
- Number of lines: 14
- Website: https://ecopronn.ru/

Operation
- Began operation: 21 June 1896
- Operator: Ekologicheskie proekty (Экологические проекты)
- Number of vehicles: 314

Technical
- System length: 98.5 km (61.2 mi) (1935)
- Track gauge: 1,435 mm (4 ft 8 1/2 in); Broad gauge
- Electrification: 600 V DC overhead lines
System map
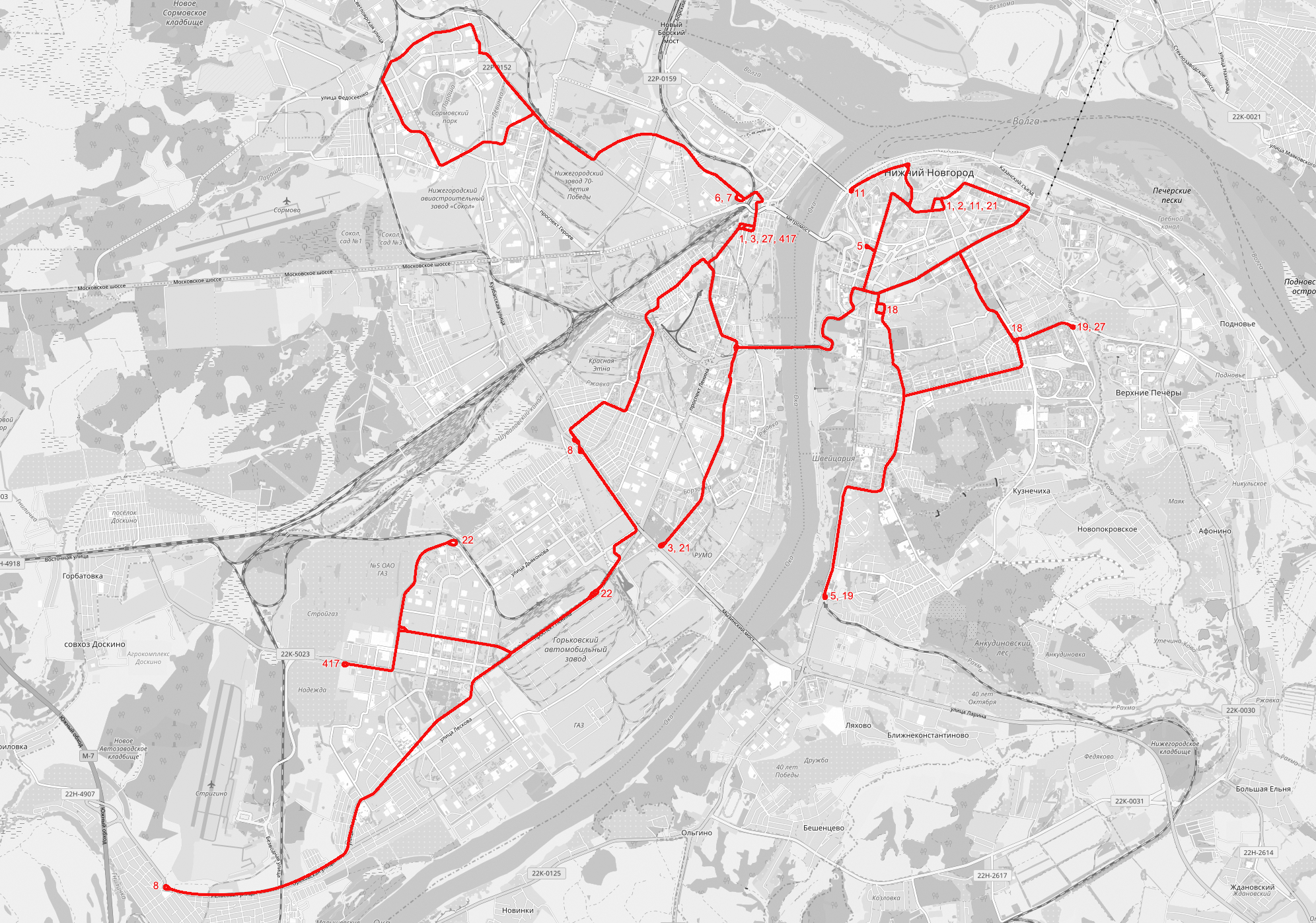

The Nizhny Novgorod tram network (Нижегородский трамвай) (formerly Gorky tram network) comprises 16 tramlines and uses a standard Russian broad gauge. Trams have been operating in Nizhny Novgorod since 1896, but services were interrupted for a few years following the 1917 Russian Revolution.

== History ==
=== Three tram companies ===
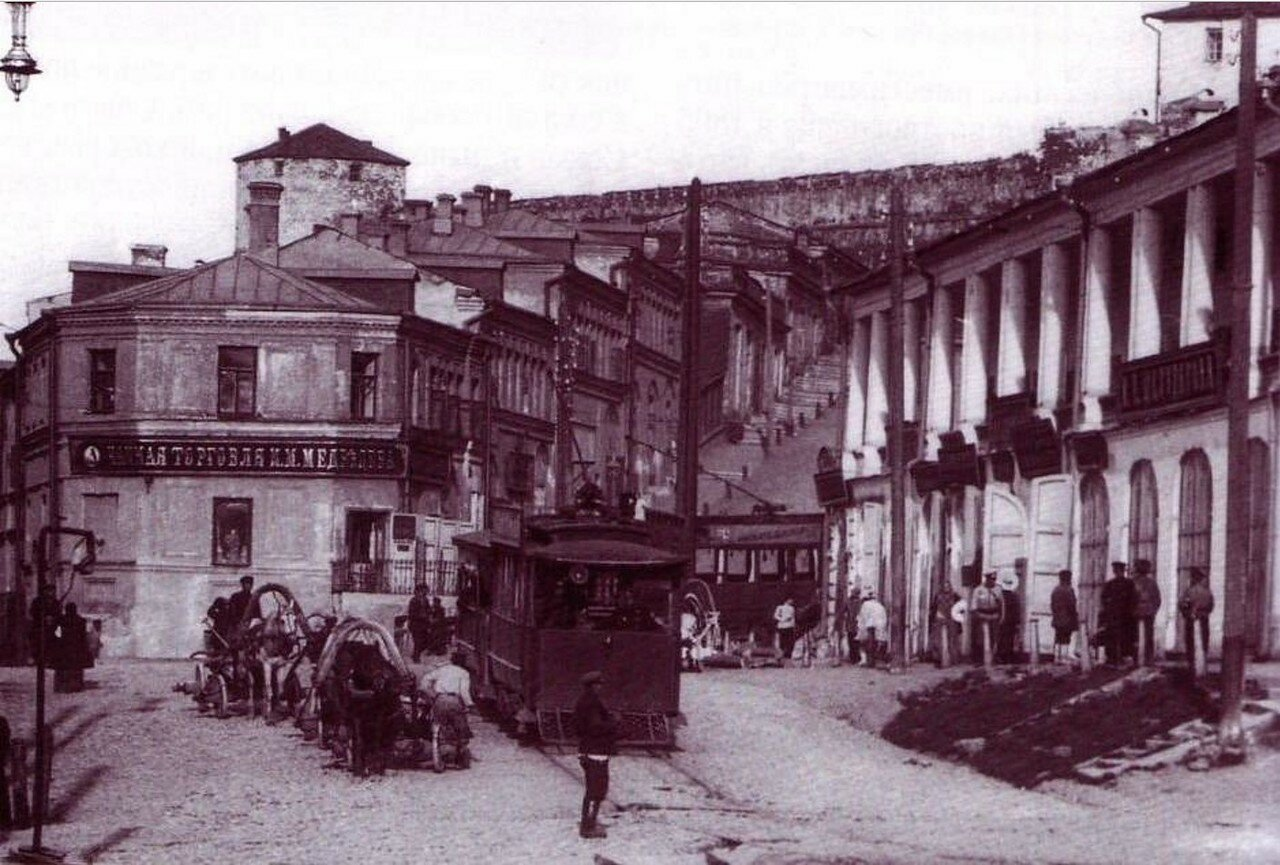
Lantern tram of the Putilov factory at the terminus "Skoba" in Nizhny Novgorod

The history of trams in Nizhny Novgorod begins with an informal competition involving three companies. On 15 May 1895 the firm Hartmann & Co signed a contract with the city to build two lines. Later in the summer of the same year Siemens & Halske also concluded a contract. A third company building a tramline, Podobedow & Co. Siemens, won the race, with a tramline ready for use on 20 May 1896 and formally opened on 21 June. This line, which led to the showground being used for the vast All-Russia Exhibition, was closed down again after the exhibition ended in October. However, a year later, after the tracks and overhead power lines had been removed, the line was reconstructed, except that it now stopped slightly short of the former exhibition site.

It was also on 21 June 1896 that Hartmann & Co opened their two Metre gauge lines both of which linked Minin-Pozharsky (Малой Покровским) Square with what has since been renamed Gorky Square. However, the two lines followed different routes. There was a 3.7 km (2.3 mi) line through the upper town (Grand Kremlin / citadel) and a 1.4 km (0.87 mi) line through the lower (river shore level) town. Together they therefore formed a closed "circle" tramline, except that at the end points the altitude differences were far too extreme for a continuous line: for passengers/pedestrians the terminus stations were therefore connected using large elaborate elevators (lifts), known as the Kremlewski Elevator and the Poklavinsky Elevator.

The third of the companies, Podobedov & Co., already had experience of constructing a temporary "on-ice" tram line at St. Petersburg, and they brought their expertise to Nizhny Novgorod for a 750 mm narrow gauge 3.7 km (2.3 mi) line serving the 1896 exhibition site itself. The vehicles included a special tramcar for the Royal family.

=== Crossing the river and an ownership changes in 1897 ===
The Nizhny Novgorod tram network in 1896 * red = Hartmann & Co * green=Siemens & Halske * ring line on exhibition site = Podobedow & Co.

It was not till 16 June 1897 that Siemens built the first tram crossing of the Oka River, using a pontoon bridge. This was as part of a 3.5 km (2.2 mi) broad gauge line linking the city's Moscow line terminus with what is today known as Skobe. Initially the Siemens line over the bridge was extended along the right bank of the Oka, but this ran parallel with the Hartmann & Co "lower town" line near the river shore and the Siemens extension was dismantled by order of the city authorities.

In 1897 the Hartmann & Co system was renamed "Russian Company for electric trams and lighting" ("Русскому обществу электрических дорог и электрического освещения", known today as Nizhegorodelektrotrans / Нижегородэлектротранс). The original contracts concluded in 1895 had always identified the city as the owner of any tramlines, but they had included the right for Hartmann to lease the concession to operate the trams for 35 years. The name change marked the point where Hartmann sold this concession back to the city. The next year the Siemens & Halske concession also passed to the Russian company, after which the "Russian Company for electric trams and lighting" became Nizhny Novgorod's monopoly tram operator till 1908.

=== Further expansion and a single gauge standard ===
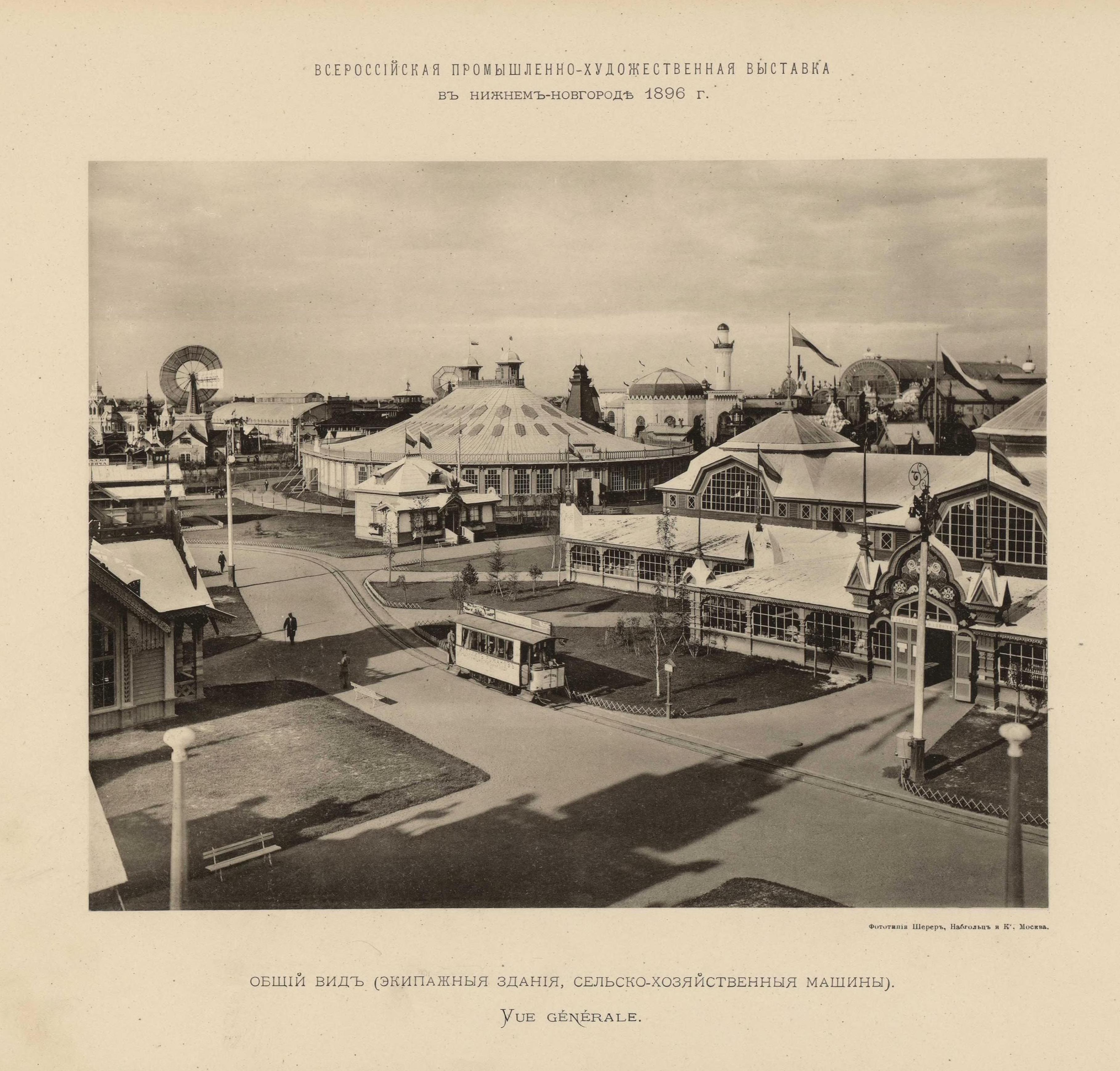
Narrow gauge (Podobedov & Co.) tramcar at the 1896 Exhibition

In 1901 the line connecting Pochvalinski und Ostrohnaya opened, followed in 1902 by the line between Kremlevsko and Monastyrnya. The line in the "upper town" was extended to 11.5 km (7.1 mi).

The decision was taken in 1910 to standardise the gauge, using the Broad gauge that had already become standard across most of the Russian rail network. The work was completed in 1923, and was also applied to the rails of the horse tram that had operated between 1908 and 1918.

=== Years of war and revolution ===
On 8 October 1914 the municipality purchased the "Russian Company for electric trams and lighting" ("Русскому обществу электрических дорог и электрического освещения" for 1.2 Million rubles. Disruption following the 1917 Russian Revolution and the Civil War led to the suspension of operations on 1 May 1919. The trams only started to run again on 3 August 1923.

=== Unified network, new trams and further expansion ===
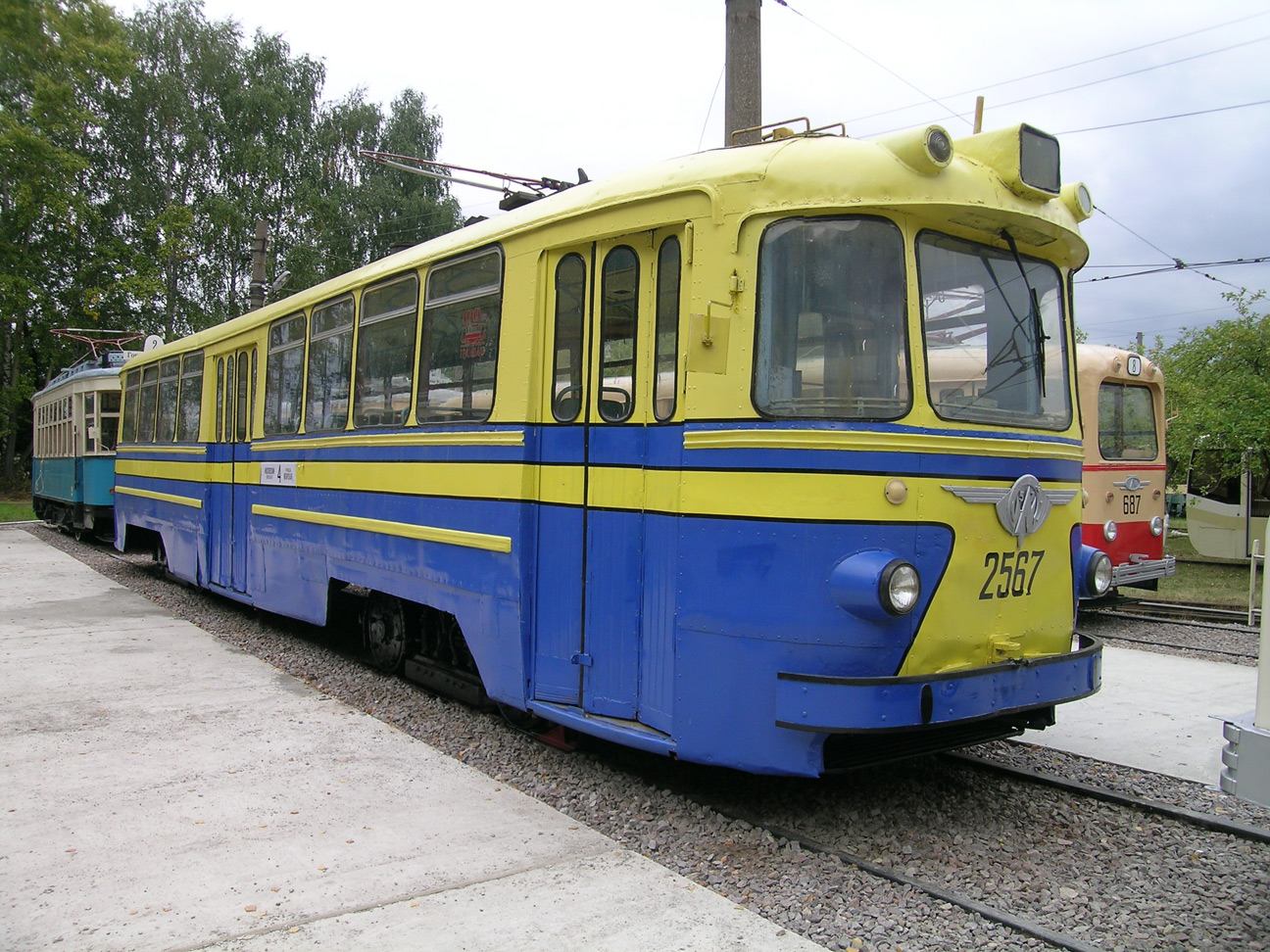
This Soviet era (1957 design) LM-57 tramcar can still be hired for Nizhny Novgorod city sightseeing

Four years later, on 10 October 1927, the "upper town" and "lower town" networks were finally linked up. This left the city with a connected tram network of 21.3 km (13.2 mi). At this stage, however, the tramcars themselves were still based on the original ones acquired when the system was set up. In 1930 the city purchased 30 new tramcars from the Mytishchi factory (today the Metrowagonmash company) on the north-eastern edge of Moscow. Another 24 tramcars followed in 1932.

1930 was also the year in which the city, in collaboration with the Michigan based Ford Motor Company, started work on what would become the giant GAZ Car plant, then known as the Nizhegorodsky Avtomobilny Zavod and later known for producing Volga cars as well as a huge number of commercial and military vehicles. In 1932 the plant produced its first passenger car, a Ford Model A according to western sources, and on 1 April 1933 the factory received its own 7 km (4.3 mi) (approx) tram connection with the rest of the city network. As a result of this and other projects, by 1935 the Gorky tram network had grown to 98.5 km (61.2 mi).

=== War ===
War returned, between the Soviet Union and Germany in June 1941, and most of the tram workers were conscripted into the army: their places were taken by women. Another feature of the period was a widespread shortage of fuel for heating and energy, and it was necessary to switch off heating in the tramcars. However, none of the nine significant air-raids that the city suffered during the German invasion damaged the tram network.

=== Postwar expansion followed by more choices for passengers ===
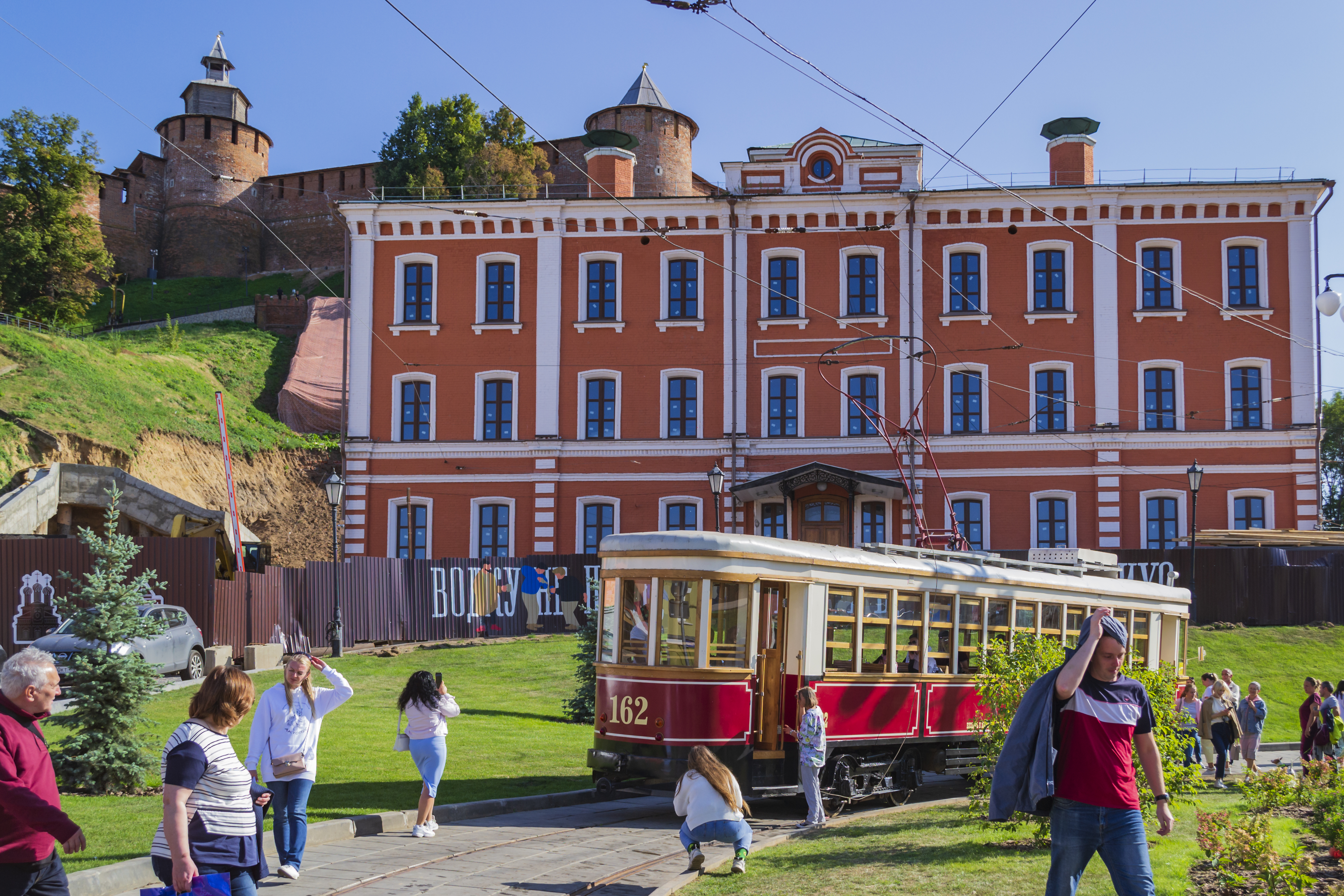
KM tram in the National Unity Square

The 1950s and 1960s were years of expansion. By 1960 a further 98.5 km (61.2 mi) of lines had been constructed, and the network was now organised into 18 routes. The total network in 1965 extended to 160.3 km (99.6 mi). The system was further enhanced in 1968 with a new larger tram depot.

Later in the 1960s competition from buses increased. Investment in new tramlines stopped, and a project already underway to build a new tram bridge across the Oka River was not completed. Competition for investment intensified in 1977 when work began on the city metro system, and competition for passengers on the busiest lines intensified further after 1985 when the first stretch of Metro line became operational. From the mid-1980s there was nevertheless a return to tram investment, but following the economic challenges posed by the Perestroika revolution, there was also an increased emphasis on efficiency. A reconfiguration of the network followed in 1992 which reduced the number of operational tramcars needed.

=== Modern usage ===
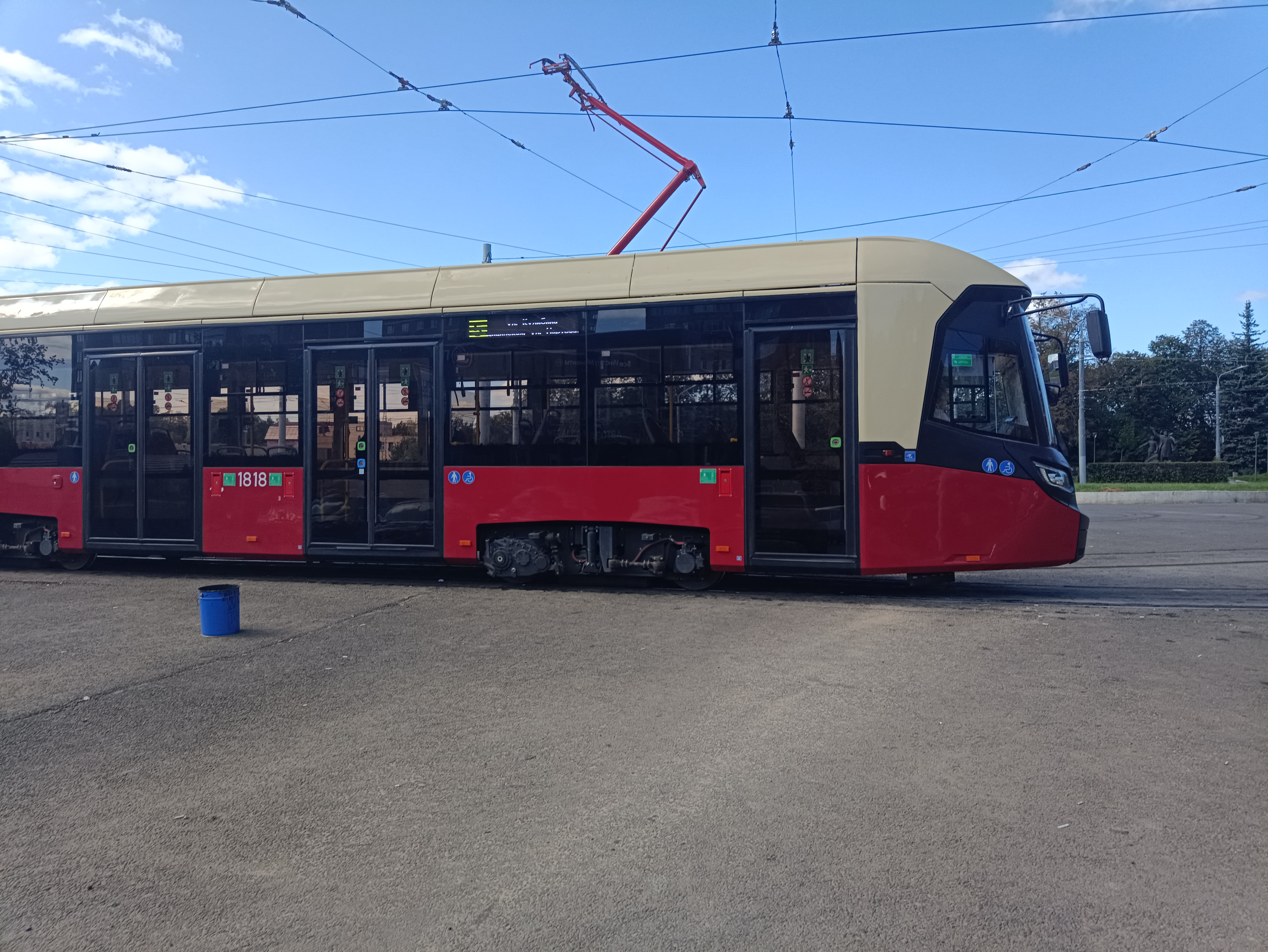
"MiNiN" tram at a Myza tram station.

Today the Nizhny Novgorod tram network employs around 5,000 people and 387 tramcars across a network of approximately 198 km (123 mi). Internet rumours that the city tram network was to be progressively run down surfaced a few years ago: they were emphatically and officially denied. From November 2022 a network is under reconstruction as a result of which 150 kilometers of rails will be modernized, 170 new trams will be bought and 3 depos will be reconstructed until the end of 2026. As of November 2024, 60 new "MiNiN" trams were already bought and 58 kilometers of rails modernized.

== See also ==
- Nizhny Novgorod Metro
- Nizhny Novgorod City Rail
- Gorky Railway
