= Solidcore Resources =

Precious metals mining company

Coordinates: 59.855°N 30.282°E

Solidcore Resources plc
- Type: Public limited company
- Industry: Mining
- Founded: 1998; 28 years ago
- Founder: Alexander Nesis (ICT Group)
- Headquarters: Kazakhstan
- Key people: Vitaly Nesis (CEO)
- Revenue: ▲US$ 1,328 million (2024)
- Operating income: ▲US$ 609 million (2024)
- Net income: ▼US$ (1,512) million (2024)
- Total assets: ▼US$ 2,069 million (2024)
- Total equity: ▼US$ 1,515 million (2024)
- Owner: Maaden International Investment (29.7%); Other Institutional Investors and individuals (69.6%); Management and Directors (0.7%)
- Number of employees: 3,600 (2024)
- Website: www.solidcore-resources.com/en/

Solidcore Resources plc, known as Polymetal International plc until June 2024, is a precious and base metals mining company registered in AIFC, Kazakhstan, and listed on Astana International Exchange. Solidcore operates two mines and one major development project in Kazakhstan. The Company's strategy aims to develop its own exploration projects, acquiring greenfield projects and leveraging its strong competencies in pressure oxidation processing technology that allows efficient treatment of refractory and double-refractory ores.

== History ==
Polymetal was founded in Saint Petersburg by Alexander Nesis of ICT Group in 1998.

The company acquired the Varvara gold and copper mine, near Kostanay in northern Kazakhstan, in June 2009.

In October 2011, Polymetal successfully completed the placing of £491m of shares on the London Stock Exchange, valuing the company at £3.55bn and making it the first Russian-founded company to obtain a premium listing at the LSE. In December 2011 Polymetal International became one of the first two Russian-originated companies to be included in the FTSE 100 Index.

Polymetal acquired another large gold mine, Kyzyl, in eastern Kazakhstan, where it could establish a processing plant, in May 2014.

In April 2019, Polymetal became the first foreign company to list on the Astana International Exchange.

In May 2023, the company announced the proposed redomiciliation of the company from Jersey to Astana (Kazakhstan) and delisting from the London Stock Exchange.

ICT Group sold its 23.9% stake in the company to a consortium led by the government of Oman in January 2024.

The company changed its name from Polymetal International to Solidcore Resources in June 2024.

== Operations ==
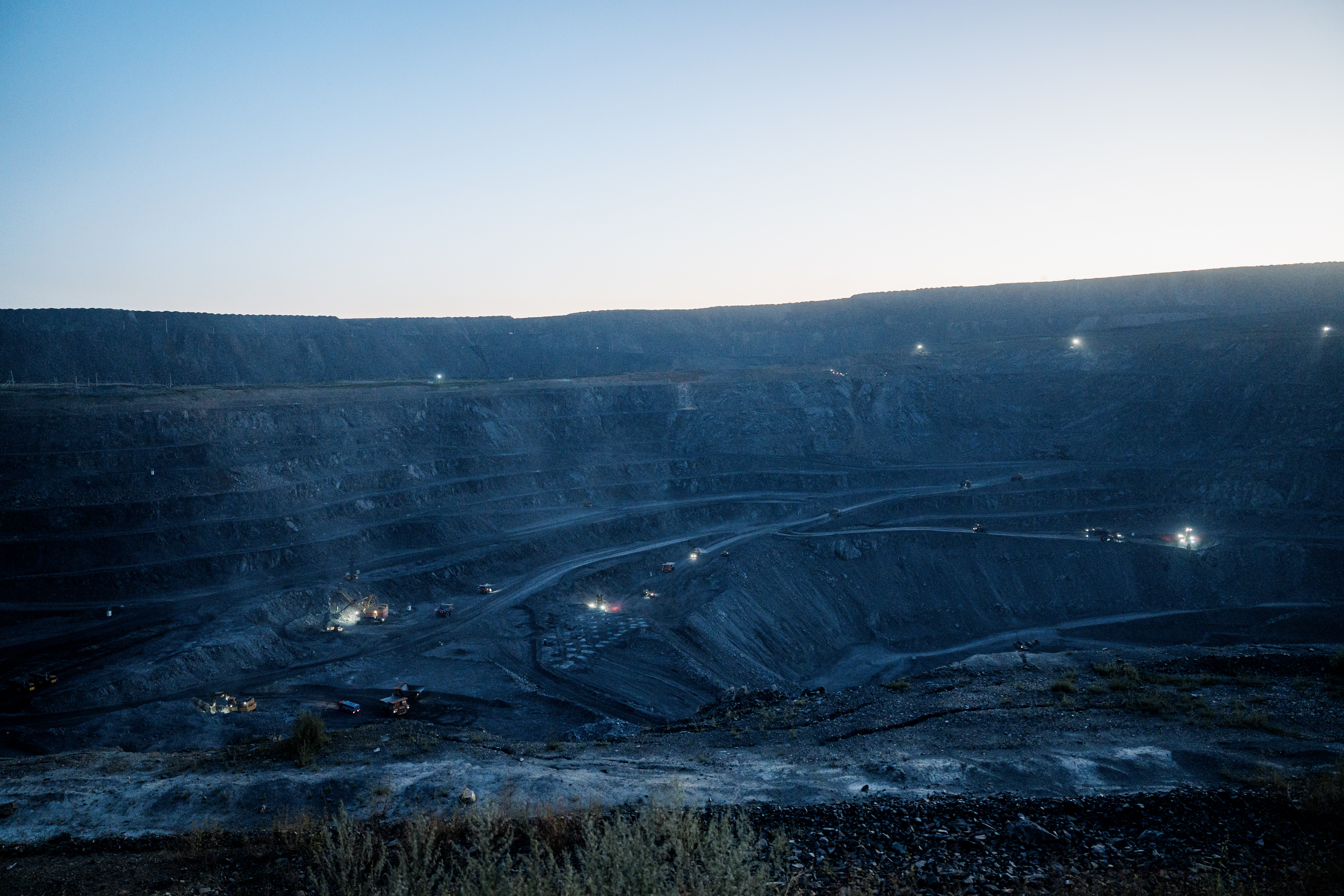
Solidcore's open pit mine in Abai Region, Kazakhstan. Image source: Solidcore Resources plc

In 2024, Solidcore produced 490 thousand ounces of gold.

Solidcore owns mines and carries out exploration activities in two regions of Kazakhstan.

Hubs:

- Varvara is Solidcore’s first operation in Kazakhstan that was acquired by the Company in 2009 as a standalone gold and copper mine with a modern 4.2 Mtpa processing plant. Today, Varvara comprises Varvara leaching and flotation facilities, Varvara open-pit mine, Komarovskoye open-pit gold deposit that was acquired in 2016 and Baksy JV. Varvara is located in Kostanai Region, Kazakhstan, 130 km south-west of the regional centre of Kostanai. At both Varvara and Komar, ore is mined via conventional open-pit truck-shovel and drill-and-blast methods. The current life-of-mine plan provides for open-pit mining until 2042, with further extensions anticipated as a result of pit enlargement and additional exploration activities, particularly at Komar.

Standalone mines:

- Kyzyl is the flagship Company’s asset and the second largest gold mine in Kazakhstan. It was acquired in 2014 for a total of US$ 618 million. The production facility combines the Bakyrchik gold deposit and 2.4 Mtpa flotation plant launched in 2018. Kyzyl is located in the Abai Region, Kazakhstan, 75 km west from Ust-Kamenogorsk. Bakyrchik gold deposit is planned to be developed via open-pit mining for more than 15 years and by underground mining starting from 2030 that can potentially last until 2054. Mined ore is processed via conventional flotation that delivers two types of concentrate — high and low carbon content.
