= K700 =

K700 may refer to:

- Sony Ericsson K700, a model of mobile phone
- Kirovets K-700, a model of heavy-duty tractor produced in former USSR and currently in Russia.
