= Alexander Nesis =

Russian businessperson

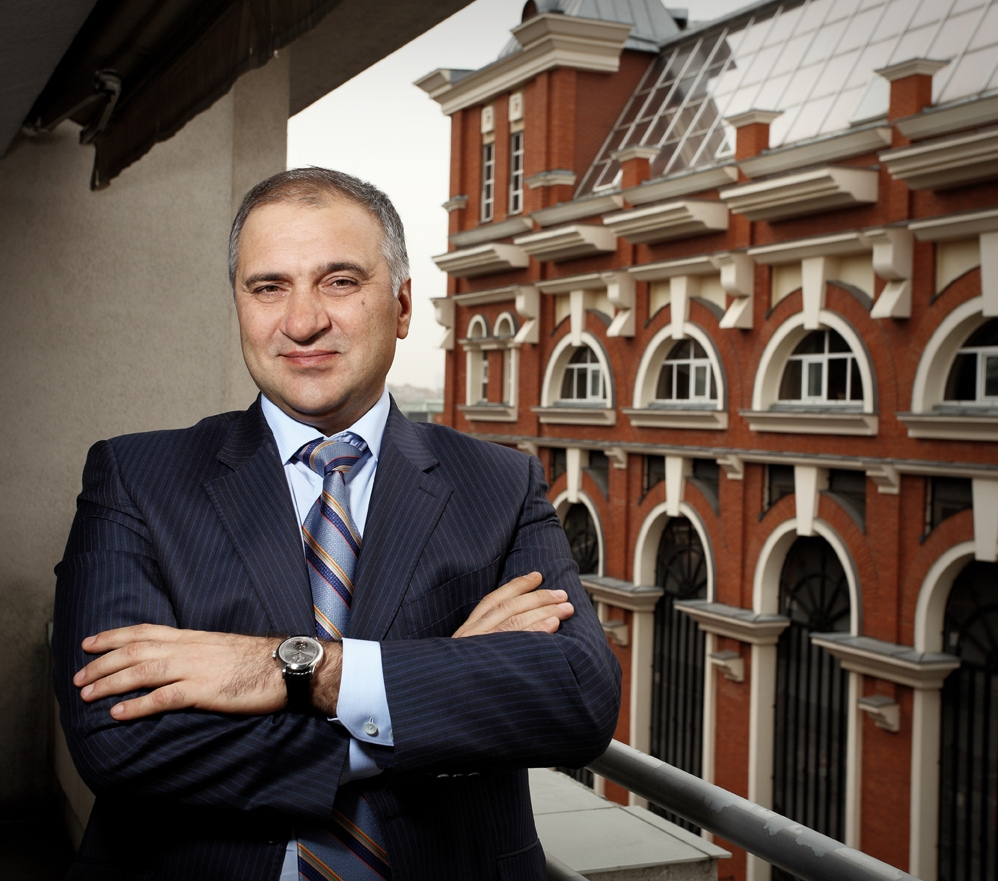
- Nesis in 2010
- Born: Александр Натанович Несис; December 19, 1962 (age 63); Leningrad, USSR
- Citizenship: Russia; Israel; Malta
- Education: Leningrad Institute of Technology
- Occupations: Founder and Сo-Owner of ICT Group

Alexander Nesis (born December 19, 1962) is a Russian entrepreneur and the largest stakeholder of a private equity firm ICT Holding Ltd. (Cyprus). He was the founder and the president of the ICT Group, a private equity entity based and operated in Russia from 1991 until 2013.

== Biography ==
Born in Leningrad in 1962, Nesis studied radiochemistry at the Lensovet Leningrad Institute of Technology. After graduation he worked as master supervisor at the Baltic Shipbuilding Yard (the largest and one of the oldest in Russia, est. 1856), which produced a variety of ships including nuclear icebreakers and submarines. In the early 1990s, Nesis left the shipyard to set out as an entrepreneur, opting to work for himself rather than for the state.

Together with a small group of business partners, he first concentrated on the production of materials derived from uranium deposits located in the deserts of Uzbekistan. In 1991, the same group of entrepreneurs embarked upon a new venture to invest in the shipbuilding and metals industries. In 1993, their company became known as the ICT Group. In the same year, Nesis returned to the Baltic Shipbuilding Yards as its controlling shareholder and Head of Board of Directors.

Chairman of the board of directors at OAO Baltiysky Zavod between 1993 and 1998 and 2002-2005.

Acted as general director and a member of the board of directors at Polymetal, 1998–2003.

Nesis is also an Israeli and Maltese citizen.

== ICT Group ==
The ICT ("Investments, Construction, Technologies") Group, founded by Nesis in the early 1990s, for years used to be one of the largest privately owned investment and industrial companies in Russia. It was headquartered in Moscow and in St. Petersburg. It invested in, developed and managed assets in wide range of industries, including the banking and financial industry, metals and mining, precious metal production, heavy engineering, logistics, construction and development.

The portfolio of assets under the Group's management included such recognized leaders in their respective industries as NOMOS-BANK, Khanty-Mansi Bank, Polymetal and United Wagon Company. From 2010 till 2013 the Group also held large equity stakes in the potash producer Uralkali and Baltic Leasing. The group's assets were located primarily in Russia, but it also had interests in Kazakhstan and developing markets.

In 2013 ICT Group (Russia) ceased its operations. Following the restructuring of assets a new private equity firm ICT Holding Ltd (Cyprus) was founded. The company focuses on equity and venture investments in international public companies from the following industries: energy, metals and mining, autos and transportation, medtech. Nesis is its largest stakeholder.

== Business Approach ==
Nesis and the ICT preferred business strategy was to set up a project and grow it until it can be run independently. ICT has been described as a kind of incubator, which holds on to investments while they are in the design or technical research stage before spinning them out separately when they have reached a critical mass. In terms of engineering, he places a strong emphasis on the design stage: "If you make a mistake at the design stage, that's very difficult to repair. If you make a mistake at the construction page, it's easier to repair [...] it's very important to find the right technology solution."

== Wealth ==
In the Forbes global ranking of "Billionaires of the World" in 2010 Nesis took 721st place, in 2012 — 367th place, in 2013 — 412th place.

In 2020 he took the 50th place in the list of the 200 richest businessmen in Russia (according to Forbes).

As of August 2022, Forbes put Nesis's personal wealth at approximately $1.9 billion, putting him at No.50 in its list of billionaires in Russia.
