= Tikhvin Freight Car Building Plant =

Russian railway freight car manufacturer

- Type: Joint-stock company
- Industry: Transport machine building
- Founded: 2011
- Headquarters: Tikhvin, Russia
- Key people: Timofey Khryapov (Chief Executive Officer at United Wagon Company, Managing Company of Tikhvin Freight Car Building Plant) Evgeny Kuzmenko (Managing Director at Tikhvin Freight Car Building Plant)
- Products: Freight cars
- Number of employees: 9,000 (2019)
- Website: www.tvsz.ru/en

Joint Stock Company “Tikhvin Freight Car Building Plant ” (TVSZ) is a Russian freight car manufacturer, the largest in the CIS. Launched in January 2012, Tikhvin Freight Car Building Plant is the main production facility of Research and production corporation “United Wagon Company”.

== History ==
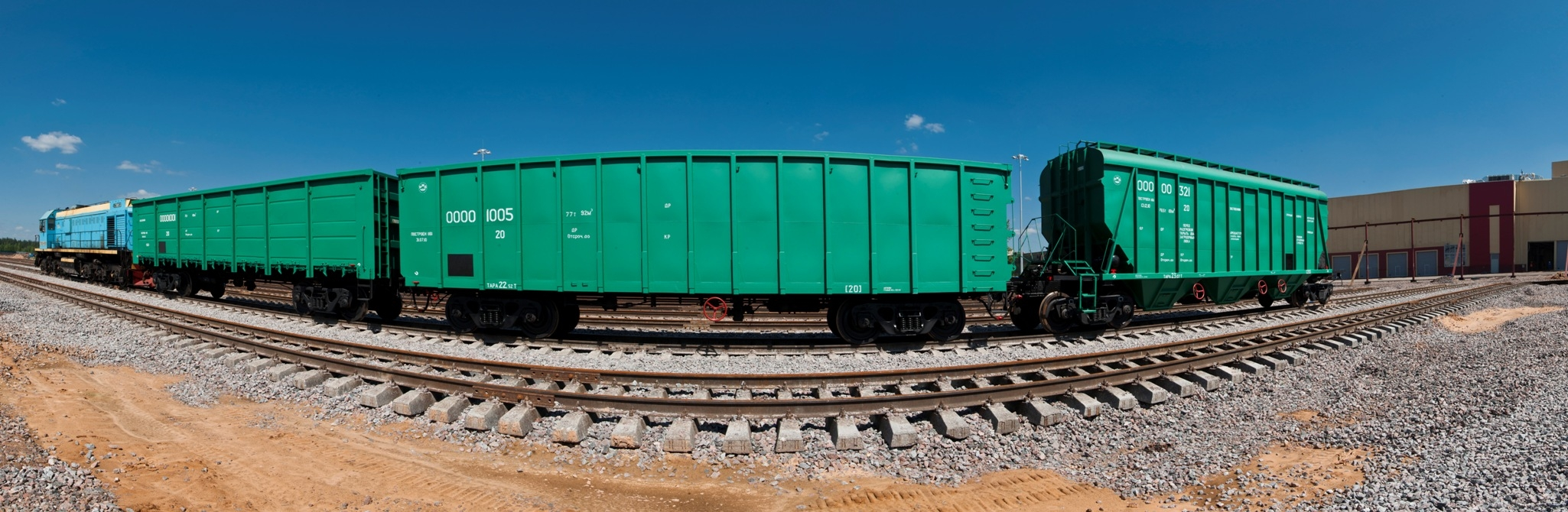
TVSZ freight wagons, 2011. Source: ICT Group

The plant was a greenfield project implemented at the site of Transmash, a former subsidiary of the manufacturing group Kirovsky Zavod and one of the USSR's most prominent industrial giants in the north-west.

The construction works commenced in January 2008. The project was co-financed by Vnesheconombank (VEB), which approval was issued by the supervisory board of Vnesheconombank, chaired by the Russian Prime Minister Vladimir Putin, in the same year.

The manufacturing facility rely on engineering developed by international companies based in Germany, Austria, UK, Slovenia, Canada, Spain, USA, the Czech Republic, Belgium and Finland. The plant's design, equipment, construction and commissioning were performed by ICM, an engineering company and a joint venture of the ICT Group and Israel-based Baran Group.

The foundry equipment and processes were advised by Krapohl-Wirth Foundry Consulting Group GmbH.

In July 2008, the plant launched pilot production at a capacity of 100 freight cars per year.

The first batch of industrial machinery was delivered to the facility in April 2010. In July the same year TVSZ started its first foundry line manufacturing 6,000 ton of railcar castings per year.

The plant's key product is the Barber bogie designed by Russian engineering centers jointly with US-based Standard Car Truck Company. The bogie's first prototype model made in Russia was tested at TVSZ in 2010.

In March 2011, Tikhvin Freight Car Building Plant sent the first batch of its freight hopper cars for test operation.

The facility was officially inaugurated on 30 January 2012. According to Vladimir Putin, “It is such state-of-the-art projects that are reshaping the national economy, reviving Russia’s manufacturing industries, and creating better employment opportunities: efficient and attractive jobs for engineers and skilled workers.”

In May 2012, United Wagon Company was founded to manage TVSZ's activities.

In June 2013, Tikhvin Freight Car Building Plant was awarded the title of the Best Industrial Project by Vnesheconombank.

In September 2013, Siberian Coal Energy Company (SUEK) and United Wagon Company signed a contract for the supply of up to 6,000 cars manufactured by Tikhvin Freight Car Building Plant. In 2015, SUEK announced its intention to purchase another 7,000 cars.

Tikhvin Freight Car Building Plant manufactured its 10,000th freight car in July 2014.

In August 2016, Tikhvin Freight Car Building Plant won the Enterprise of the Year 2016 award.

In October 2016, Tikhvin Freight Car Building Plant started to manufacture austempered ductile iron parts. The current production capacity stands at 30,000 car sets per year.

In June 2017, Tikhvin Freight Car Building Plant produced its 50,000th railcar.

In August 2017, gondola with unloading hatches of model 19-9853 manufactured by Tikhvin Freight Car Building Plant became the winner of the competition held by Russian Railways for the best quality of the rolling stock and complicated technical systems and won the first place in the nomination “Rolling stock”.

In September 2017, Tikhvin Freight Car Building Plant was awarded the AAR quality certificate by the Association of American Railroads. In the same month, the plant started to supply its heavy car castings to North America.

In December 2017, Tikhvin Freight Car Building Plant obtained a certificate of compliance with ISO/TS 22163:2017.

In August 2018, Tikhvin Freight Car Building Plant has passed a quality audit by Deutsche Bahn, the largest railway operator in the European Union. Also, in addition to the Deutsche Bahn audit, the Tikhvin Freight Car Building Plant has successfully passed certification to the EN 15085 Welding of Railway Vehicles and Components European standard.

In December 2019, Tikhvin Freight Car Building Plant has released the 100,000th freight car produced since the launch of the Tikhvin Freight Car Building Plant in January 2012.

== Specialization and products ==
The plant manufactures last- (fifth) generation freight cars mounted on bogies with an increased axle load of 25 tf. The current production capacities of Tikhvin Freight Car Building Plant are 18,400 freight cars, 67,000 wheel sets and 30,000 cast car sets per year. In 2017, the TVSZ made its first batch of 27-tf freight cars to be tested at the facilities of the Russian Railways.

== Staff ==
At the end of 2019, the number of people employed at Tikhvin Freight Car Building Plant exceeded 9,000.

== Finance ==
By the end of 2018, the turnover of Tikhvin Freight Car Building Plant amounted to RUB 57,697 billion.

== Management ==
Tikhvin Freight Car Building Plant is a subsidiary of Research and production corporation “United Wagon Company”. TVSZ's Managing Director is Evgeny Kuzmenko.
