= Foundever =

American contact center company

Foundever Group S.A.
- Type: Private
- Traded as: NYSE: SWW; Nasdaq: SITL
- Industry: Customer service and business process outsourcing
- Predecessor: HQ800; Sitel
- Founded: 1985; 41 years ago
- Founder: Laurent Uberti; Olivier Camino (Groupe Acticall founders)
- Headquarters: Luxembourg City, Luxembourg
- Number of locations: 100+
- Area served: Worldwide
- Key people: Laurent Uberti (CEO)
- Revenue: $4 billion (2023)
- Number of employees: 170,000
- Parent: Groupe Acticall
- Website: www.foundever.com

Foundever Group S.A. (previously known as Sitel Group) is a privately owned customer experience technology company headquartered in Luxembourg City. Foundever provides outsourced sales, technical support, customer service, and other business processes for large companies. The company has 170,000 employees and $4 billion in revenue.

Foundever started as a subsidiary of United Technologies called HQ800 before being bought by then-President James Lynch in 1985. Renamed to Sitel, it grew quickly and became the first telemarketing organization to go public in 1995. It expanded internationally in the 1990s and 2000s. Financial problems prompted layoffs and restructuring in 2001. In 2007, majority owner Onex Corporation de-listed Sitel from NASDAQ. Groupe Acticall SAS, the current owner and operator, acquired Sitel in 2015. In 2021, Sitel merged with Sykes Enterprises to form Foundever.

== History ==
=== Early history ===
Foundever started as a subsidiary of United Technologies called HQ800 and located in Omaha, Nebraska. Its then-President, James F. Lynch, bought the company for $165,000 in 1985. He renamed it "SITEL/Sitel," which stands for "System International TELemarketing." At the time, SITEL had about $100 million in annual revenue and 16 employees.

Sitel was listed on NASDAQ in 1995. Afterwards, it expanded internationally by opening new offices and acquiring other call center companies abroad. For example, in 1996 Sitel acquired London-based telemarketing company Mitre PLC for $230 million. Simultaneously, Sitel announced it bought a 69.2 percent interest in Teleaction, a Spanish-focused telemarketing company, for about $24 million. That same year, Sitel acquired Canadian Telephone Corporation.

In the 1990s, Sitel grew about twelve-fold to $600 million in revenues. Sitel had 24,000 employees and 70 call centers but was struggling to turn a profit. It had substantial debt from the cost of acquisitions and expenses related to closing unprofitable call centers it had acquired. In 2001, Sitel was restructured to reduce taxes and hundreds of middle-management positions were cut.

=== Ownership changes ===
By 2005, Sitel had $1 billion in annual revenue. The majority owner of Sitel Group, Onex Corporation, bought-out shareholders for $450 million in 2007, taking Sitel off NASDAQ and making it a privately owned company. Sitel was merged with Onex Corporation's subsidiary ClientLogic Corporation. Onex paid an additional $51 million in 2008 and $60 million in 2014 to buy preferred shares, bringing its ownership of Sitel to 86 percent.

France-based Group Acticall, which was founded in 1995 by Laurent Uberti and Olivier Camino, acquired Sitel in 2015, valuing the company at $850 million.

In June 2021, Sitel acquired a public customer service company Sykes Enterprises for $2.2 billion. In March 2023, Sitel and Sykes fully merged to form Foundever.

=== 2022 data breach ===
Okta, a large identity and access management company, had a security breach in early 2022 that it blamed on Sykes, one of many companies which provides customer support services for Okta. Documents leaked in May 2022 raised serious questions about Sitel/Sykes' security defenses, and gaps in Okta's response to being notified of the security breach by Sitel.

== Products and services ==
Foundever provides out-sourced call center services, as well as consulting, analytics, and support for other business processes. The company operates out of large buildings with employees that speak different languages. Its call centers are used for things like sales, customer service, collections, and back-office work. For example, employees might take a phone order for a consumer product or troubleshoot problems with a bank account. It also operates sub-brands for things like training and IT software. It also develops customer service chatbots.

Initially, Sitel primarily did sales calls for insurance and credit card companies. It started specializing in different industries and services in 1990. Sitel started doing inbound calls in 1990 tech support in 1997 and customer relationship management in 2001.
