= Sykes Enterprises =

Defunct business process outsourcing company based in Florida

Sykes Enterprises, Inc.

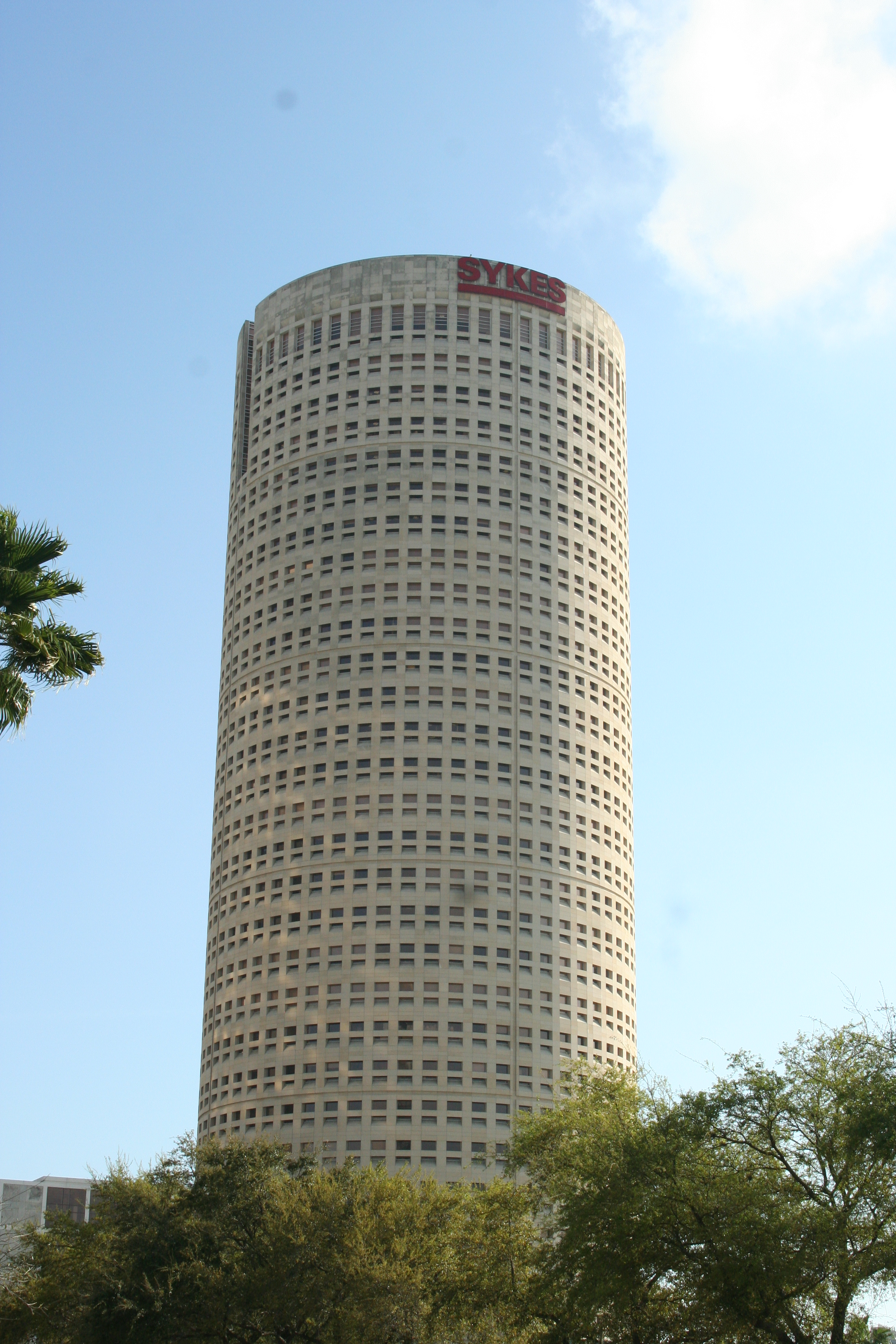
- Industry: Business process outsourcing, Offshoring
- Founded: 1977
- Founder: John H. Sykes
- Defunct: 2021
- Headquarters: Tampa, Florida, United States
- Number of locations: 66
- Key people: Charles E. Sykes (President & CEO)
- Services: Customer service; Technical support; Order fulfillment
- Revenue: ▲US$ 1,710 million (2020)
- Operating income: ▼US$ 81.78 million (2020)
- Net income: ▼US$ 56 million (2020)
- Total assets: ▲US$ 948 million (2016)
- Total equity: ▲US$ 893 million (2020)
- Number of employees: 61,100 (2020)

Sykes Enterprises, Inc. (stylized as SYKES) was an American multinational business process outsourcing provider headquartered in Tampa, Florida. The company provided business process outsourcing (BPO) services, IT consulting, and IT-enabled services, such as technical support and customer service.

In 2021, Sitel Group acquired Sykes for $2.2 billion. In March 2023, Sitel and Sykes fully merged to form Foundever.

== History ==
Sykes was founded in 1977 by John H. Sykes in Charlotte, North Carolina, to provide engineering and design services to large corporations. Companies such as IBM, AT&T, and Texas Instruments were among Sykes' first clients.

In 1992, the company moved into the customer service business by purchasing Jones Technologies, a call center company based in Sterling, Colorado.

In 1993, Sykes relocated its corporate headquarters from Charlotte to Tampa, Florida.

Sykes became a publicly traded company in 1996. The company was listed on NASDAQ under the stock symbol SYKE.

David Grimes, a former AT&T executive, was named president of Sykes in 1998. John Sykes remained CEO and chairman. In 2000, Grimes became president and CEO. However, after 3 months, Grimes resigned and Sykes returned as president and CEO.

Charles Sykes, John Sykes' son, became president and CEO of the company in 2004. Charles had been with the company 17 years before assuming his father's position.

On June 18, 2021, a Sitel Group subsidiary acquired all outstanding shares of Sykes in a cash transaction valued at approximately $2.2 billion, removing the company from Nasdaq's publicly traded companies. The Sitel Group, in its new combination, brings together 160,000 employees in 40 countries, serving more than 700 customers and in more than 50 languages.

=== Acquisitions ===
In 1992, Sykes purchased Jones Technologies, Inc. in Sterling, Colorado and entered into the customer support business. Four years later, Sykes acquired Datasvar Support AB of Sweden and Diagsoft Inc. of Scotts Valley, California; one year after this, they purchased both McQueen International Limited and the German company Telcare. In 2006, Sykes acquired Argentina-based Apex America; in 2010, they acquired ICT Group. In 2012, Sykes purchased Alpine Access and three years later a company called Qelp. In 2016, Sykes acquired Clearlink from Utah and two years later the Robotic process automation service provider Symphony Ventures. In 2020, Sykes carried out its last acquisition before being acquired by the Sitel Group in 2021. It purchased Taylor Media Corp. (TMC), a personal finance digital media company and owner of The Penny Hoarder.
