= Tikhvin Ferroalloy Plant =

Tikhvin Ferroalloy Plant (Russian: ЗАО "Тихвинский ферросплавный завод" - ТФЗ) is a company based in Tikhvin, Russia.

== History ==
In 1994, a company was established to construct a $110 million manufacturing plant capable of producing 140,000 tonnes of ferrochromium and 150,000 tonnes of crushed residue per year. A 1997 referendum in Tikhvin opposed the establishment of the plant, but after acquiring the unfinished project in 2001, ICT Group announced its intention to complete its construction. The opening of the plant remains contentious. It is seen as an example of government collusion with big business.

The Tikhvin Ferroalloy Plant finally began production in 2007. A low world demand for ferrochromium delayed the factory's ramp-up to full production, with two furnaces started in 2007 and another two in 2008. The company began production from concentrated chrome ore from the Mechel-held Voskhod chrome processing plant (ГОКа "Восход-Хром") in Kazakhstan in early 2009. The plant's four furnaces have a maximum power of 22.5 MW. In 2009 production was 53,900t (chromium equivalent) with a typical chromium content of 69-70% in the ferroalloys. In 2010, it employed 720 people.

In April 2008, the plant's owner, Oriel Resources, was acquired by Mechel. In 2013, Mechel sold its ferroalloy holdings, including the Tikhvin plant, to Yildirim (Turkey).
