= John H. Sykes =

American business man

John H. Sykes is an American businessman who is the founder of Sykes Enterprises Incorporated. Sykes was born in Charlotte, North Carolina and attended High Point University and Queens University of Charlotte, as well as Rollins College. He serves a Chairman Emeritus of Sykes Inc. and remains active in the Tampa Business community.

== Career ==
Sykes founded Sykes Enterprises in 1977 in Charlotte and later moved the company to its present headquarters in Tampa, Florida in 1993. Prior to founding Sykes Enterprises, Sykes served as Senior Vice President in charge of Corporate Development for the CDI Corporation.

Sykes has also branched out into the thoroughbred horse breeding business. He purchased Clover Leaf Farms II in Ocala, Florida in 1997. The farm was outfitted as a facility designed for the breeding, development and training of thoroughbreds. It also focuses specifically on sale preparation and resale. The farm made headlines for selling I'll Get Along, the dam of the thoroughbred champion Smarty Jones.

== University of Tampa ==
Sykes made his permanent mark on the city of Tampa when, in 1997, he made a 10 million dollar donation to the University of Tampa. He topped this gift in 2000 by donating an additional 28 million dollars, thought to be the largest gift ever given to a Florida University as of that time. In honor of his generous contributions and in recognition of his achievements, the University of Tampa renamed its College of Business the John H. Sykes College of Business. He also holds two honorary doctorates from the University of Tampa one in Business Administration and another in Humane Letters.
