= Trams of Putilov plant =

Trams of Putilov plant - wagons of series F (Fonarniy), MS (Motorny Stalnoy) and PS (Pritsepnoy Stalnoy), made by Putilov plant in Saint Petersburg.

== Models ==
=== F ===
Full motor wagon. There were six rectangular windows of conventional type. Headlamps absent, they replace a pair of searchlights, suspended from the bottom to the roof of the two sites wagon.

=== MS-1 ===
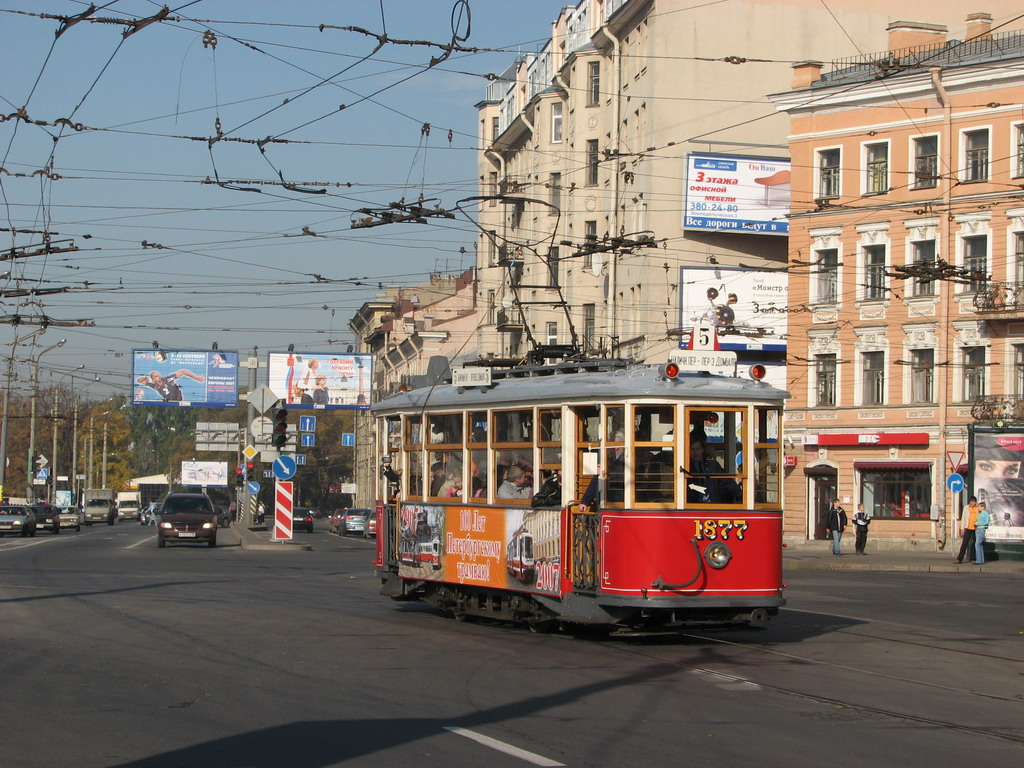
MS-1 tram at Dobrolyubova prospect in Saint Petersburg.

Bilateral wagon with two cabins. Head-sheets have rounded forms. Number of seats - 24. Available in 1927.

=== PS ===
Wagon on a bilateral free axles without bogies. The diameter wheels smaller than MS. Venue shorter than that of MS. Available in 1929.

=== MS-2 ===
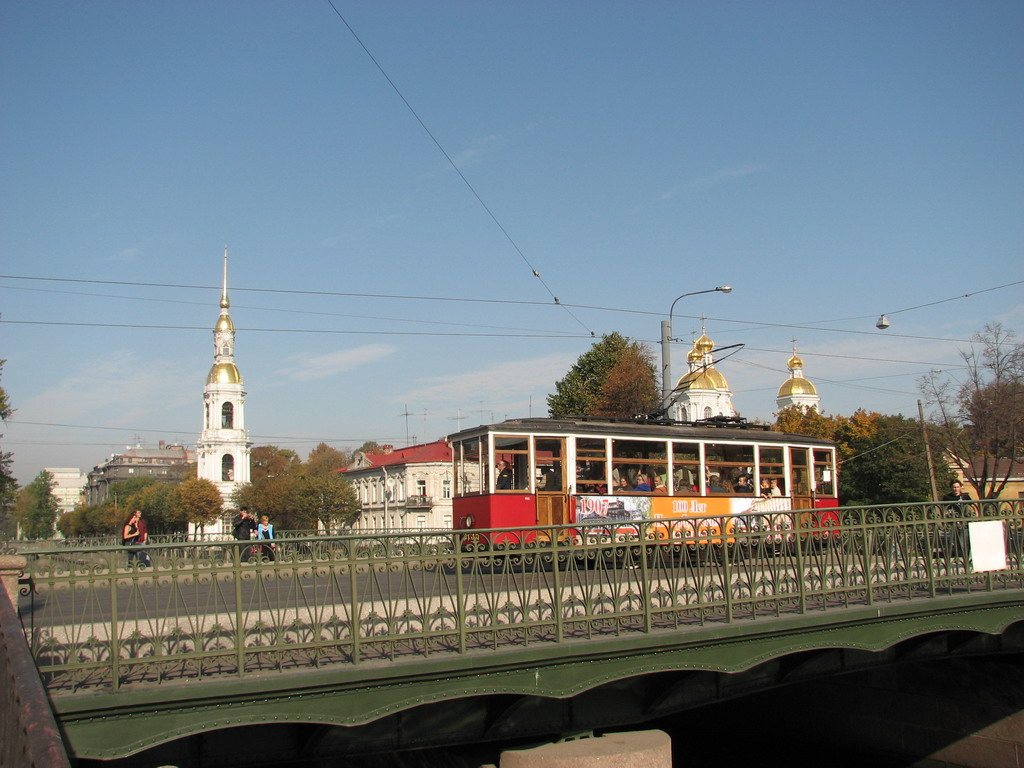
MS-2 tram at Staro-Nikolksy bridge in Saint Petersburg.

Tram MS-2 at Staro-Nicholas Bridge in St. Petersburg.

Bilateral wagon with two cabins. Handrails at the entrance to the salon (no doors), open platform. Head-sheets have a flat shape.

=== MS-3 ===
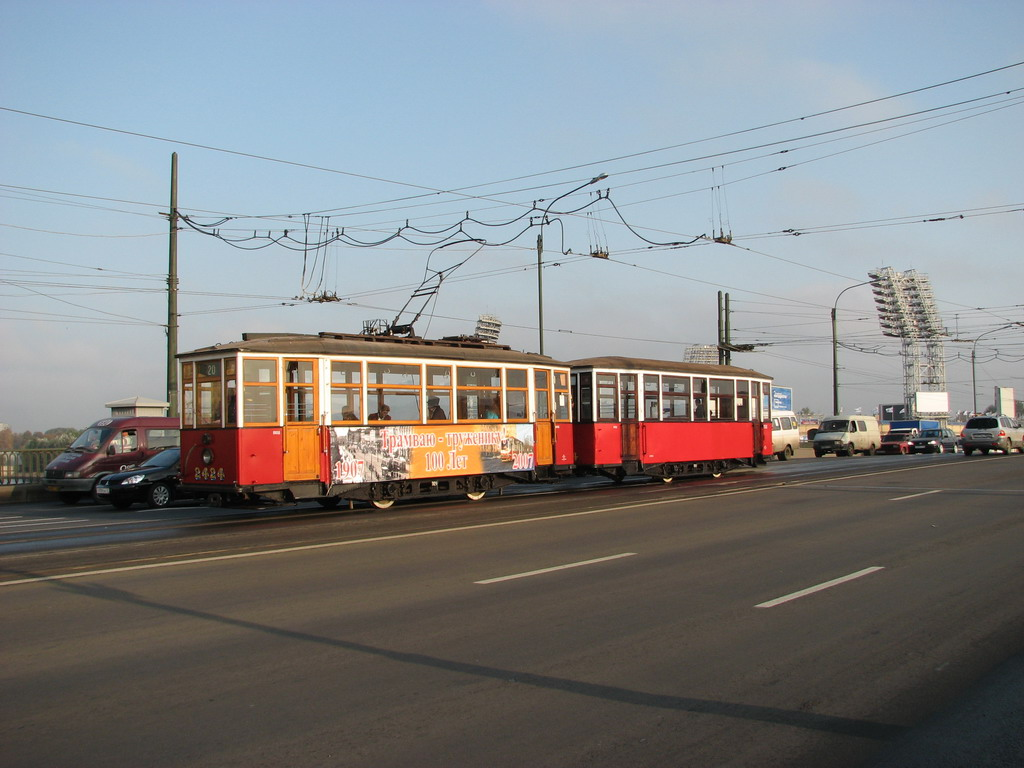
MS-3 and MSP-3 tram at Tuchkov bridge in Saint Petersburg.

Bilateral wagon with two cabins. Closed sites, indoor saloon. Head-sheets have a flat shape. Number of seats - 24.

=== MSP-3 ===
Bilateral wagon with two cabins. Closed sites, indoor saloon. Head-sheets have a flat shape. Number of seats - 24.

=== MS-4 ===
Bilateral wagon with two cabins. Closed sites, indoor saloon. Head-sheets have a flat shape. Number of seats - 24.

=== MSO-4 ===
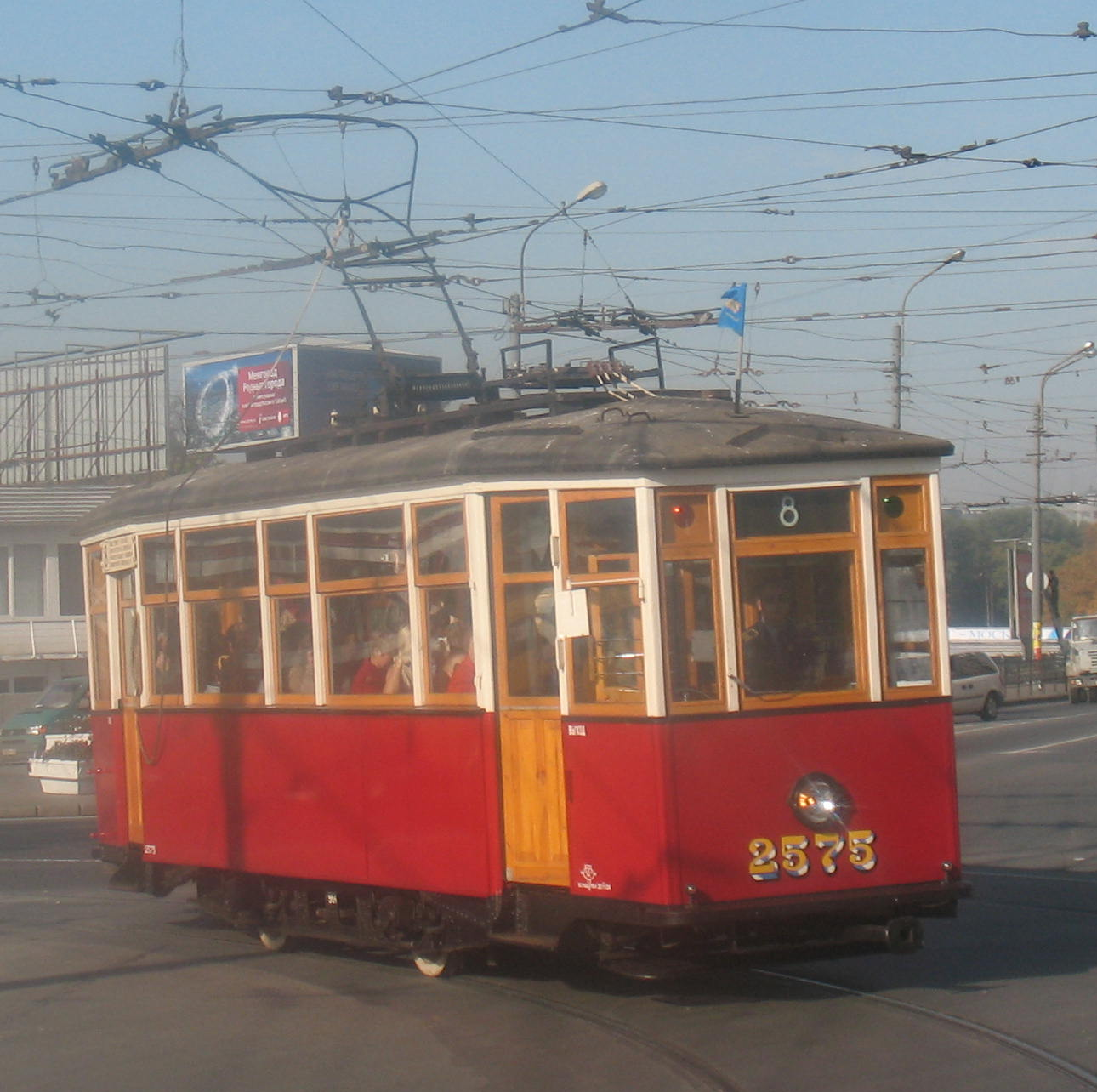
MSO-4 tram in Saint Petersburg.

Unilateral wagon with one cabin. Closed sites, indoor saloon. Head-sheets have a flat shape. Number of seats - 27.

=== MSP-4 ===
Bilateral wagon with two cabins without a motor. Closed sites, indoor saloon. Head-sheets have a flat shape.

== Geographical Spread ==
Putilov plant's trams were used in Almaty, Astrakhan, Biysk, Vladikavkaz, Zaporozhye, Irkutsk, Izhevsk, Kalinin, Kirovabad, Krasnodar, Kuybyshev, Kursk, Lipetsk, Leningrad, Minsk, Nizhny Novgorod, Nizhny Tagil, Novokuznetsk, Novorossiysk, Sverdlovsk, Simferopol, Taganrog, Temirtau and Ufa.

== Current state ==
So far, the museum electrical transport in Saint Petersburg survived several copies of MS-1, MS-2, an MSP-3, several MS-4 and an MSO-4. Several cars MS has been used in Saint Petersburg as an official.
