= John Sykes (footballer) =

English footballer

Personal information
- Full name: John Sykes
- Date of birth: 2 November 1950 (age 75)
- Place of birth: Huddersfield, England
- Position: Inside forward

Senior career*
Years	Team	Apps	(Gls)
1968–1969	Bradford Park Avenue	1	(0)
1969	Wrexham	1	(0)
- * Club domestic league appearances and goals

John Sykes (born 2 November 1950) is an English former professional footballer who played as a forward. He made appearances in the English football league with Bradford Park Avenue and Wrexham before emigrating to Australia.
