= Kirovets K-700 =

Russian heavy duty tractor

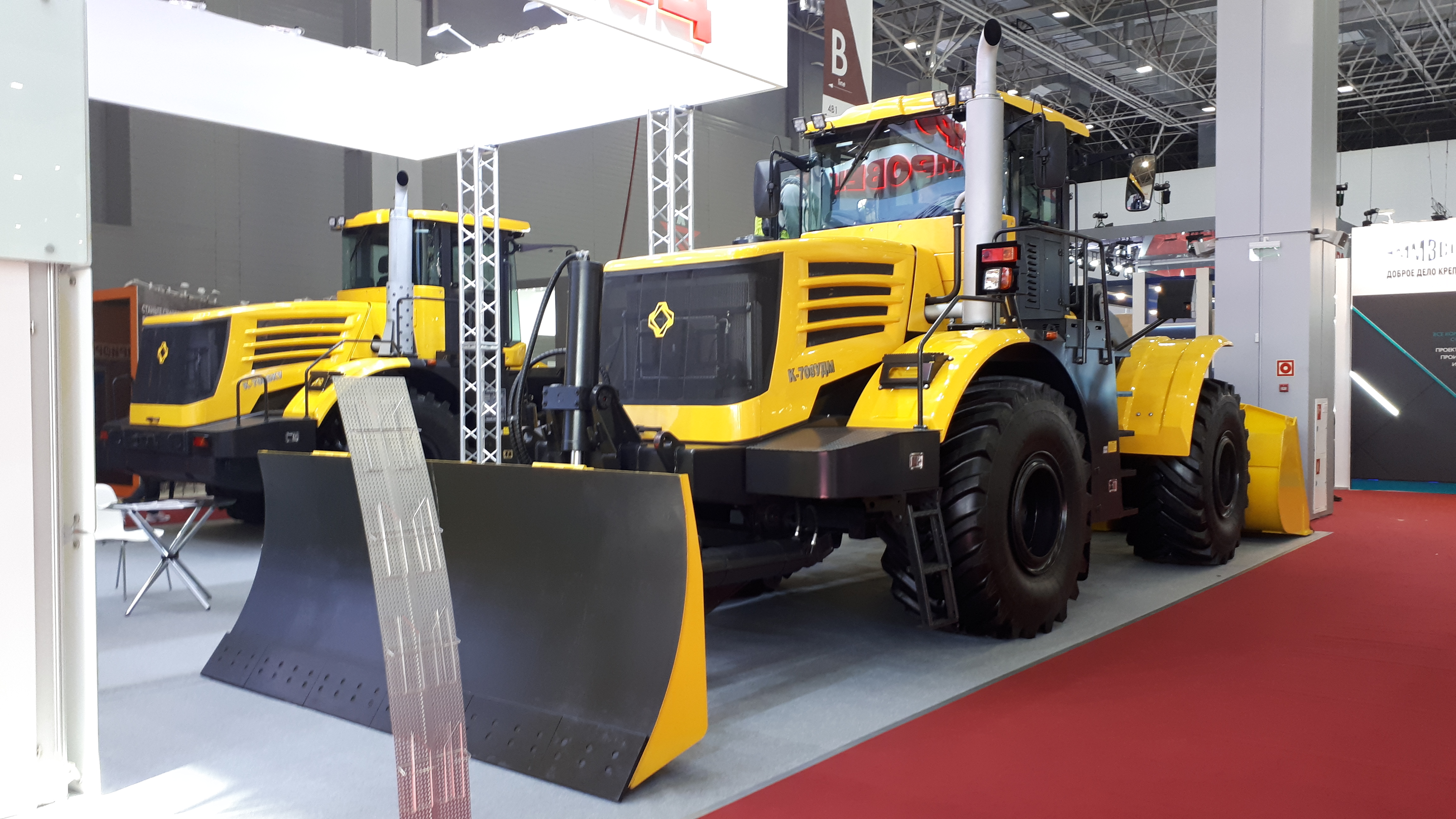
- A K-708 tractor during the "Armiya 2020" exhibition
- Type: agricultural, heavy duty
- Manufacturer: Kirov Plant
- Production: 13 July 1962 - 1 February 2002
- Length: 7400 mm
- Width: 2880 mm
- Height: 3950 mm
- Weight: 12.8 tonnes. (K-700 A); 13.4 tonnes (K-701)
- Propulsion: wheels

The K-700 (Russian: К-700) is a four-wheel drive, heavy duty tractor from the former USSR and current Russian manufacturer of Kirov Plant (Russian: Кировец).

== History ==
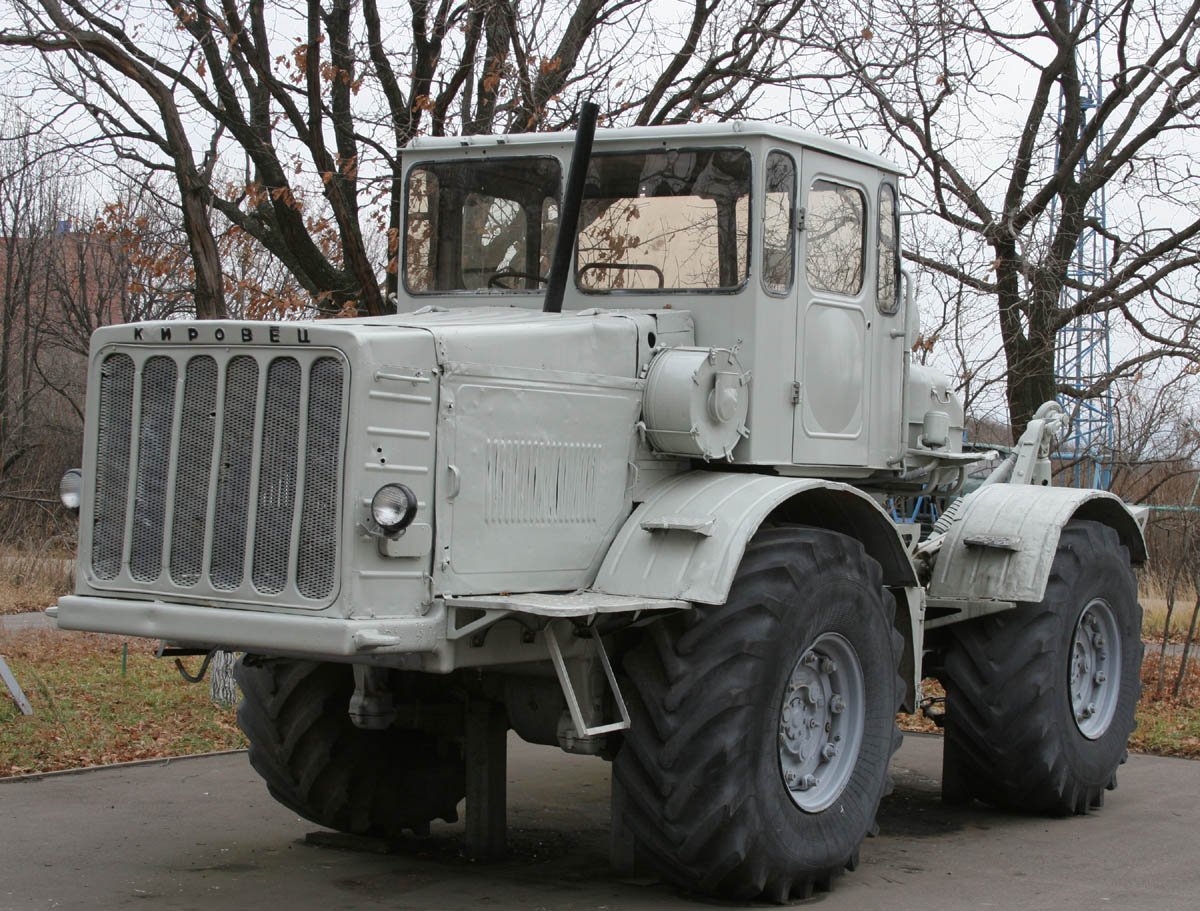
A K-700 tractor in Saratov on the mountain of Sokolova

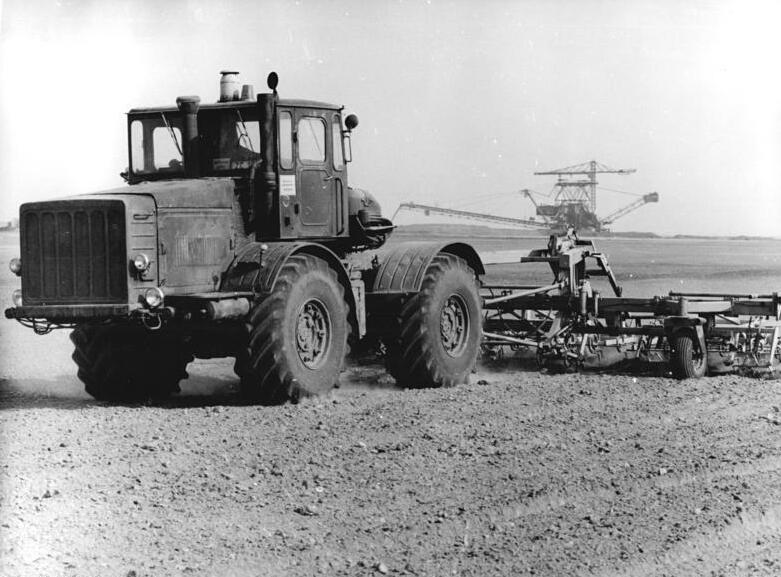
A K-700 plowing on the fields of East Germany, November 1986

The tractor was manufactured in 1962, its basic design has been adopted in several subsequent models. The K-700s were also exported to the Comecon member—GDR imported K-700s starting from year 1968. The K-700 is a heavy four-wheel drive tractor-pulling force of 50 kN-class articulated and disconnectable rear wheel drive. The connecting piece of the front and rear frame part is movable about the vertical and the longitudinal axis, the steering takes place by lateral bending by means of hydraulic. It is powered by a turbo diesel V8 engine with 215 HP. The K-700 1975 was the further development of K-700A, including the disposal of the next larger fuel tanks (two tanks of 320 liter capacity) due to larger tires for better traction. The K-700A provided only a temporary solution. Also in 1975, a successor of K-700 appeared: the K-701. The K-701 has a naturally aspirated 12-cylinder diesel engine with 300 HP. The K-700 tractors were particularly large sized, handling well although the noise and vibration load on the driver was relatively high. In the GDR, its size in off-field operations was sometimes cumbersome. Furthermore, the tractor's sheer size often resulted in soil degradation.

Kirovets tractors were imported to the United States and Canada for a time under the Belarus brand. They have recently been reintroduced under the MTZ brand.

K-700s and its variants are still used today in former east bloc countries. They are mostly referred as "Ka", because of the model prefix K.

== Models and Variants ==
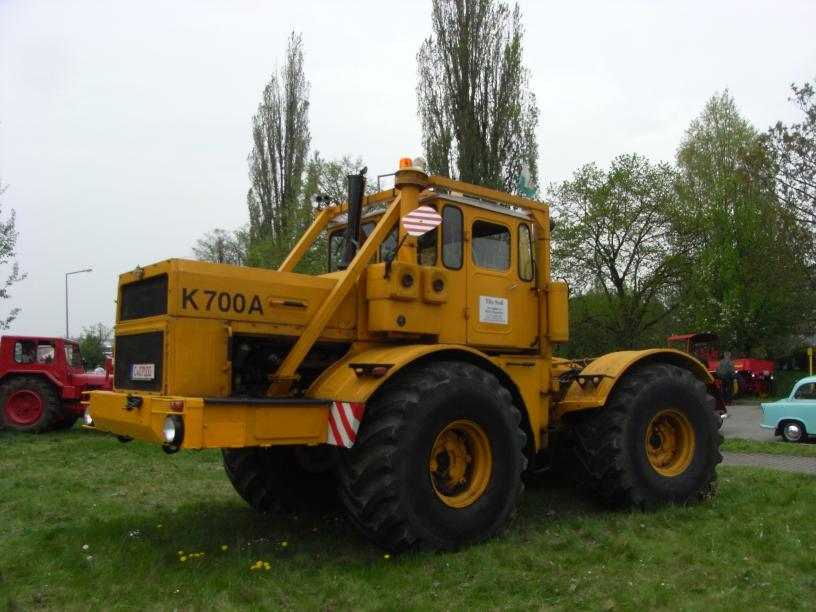
A K-700A model

K-701 at work on a field in Estonia

- K-700 - the base model.
- K-700A - Next model (with a unified K-701, the engine YaMZ-YaMZ-238NDZ (Russian: ЯМЗ-238НД3) turbo).
- K-701 - Next model (unified with R-700A, YaMZ-240 (Russian: ЯМЗ-240)).
- K-701M - engine power increased to 300 HP
- K-701 Truck 6X6 V12 All wheel driven truck model for all kinds of roles based on the K701 model.
- K-702 - Industrial modification for use as a base machine for loaders, bulldozers, rollers, scrapers: the system changed portions, only the hydromechanical transmission, suspension rigid.
- K-703 - Industrial modification. The tractor has a reversing control station, allowing the driver to work in a normal position as in the course of the tractor forward, and in the course of the tractor back..
- K-704 - Industrial modification for use as truck crane.
- K-710 - Prototype of tractor with increased engine power to 500 HP

== Specifications ==
Dimensions

- Length: 7400 mm
- Width: 2880 mm
- Height (in cockpit): 3950 mm
- Minimum turning radius: 7200 mm
- Track width: 2115 mm
- Weight of K-700 A: 12.8 tonnes
- Weight of K-701: 13.4 tonnes

Speed

- forward 2,9-33,8 km/h
- backwards 5,1-24,3 km/h

Powertrain

- Power of YaMZ-240 B (Russian: ЯМЗ-240 Б) V12 300 horsepower (224 kW) at 1900 rev/min. Maximum torque of 1240 Nm.
- Power of YaMZ-238 NB (Russian: ЯМЗ-238 НБ) V8 turbo 230 horsepower (172 kW) at 1700 rev/min. Maximum torque of 950 Nm.
