= United Wagon Company =

Russian freight car manufacturer

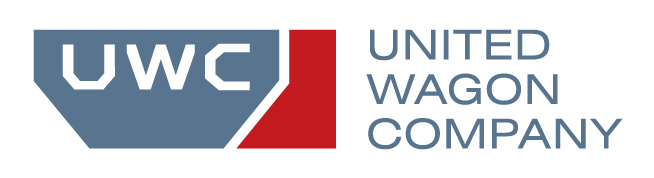

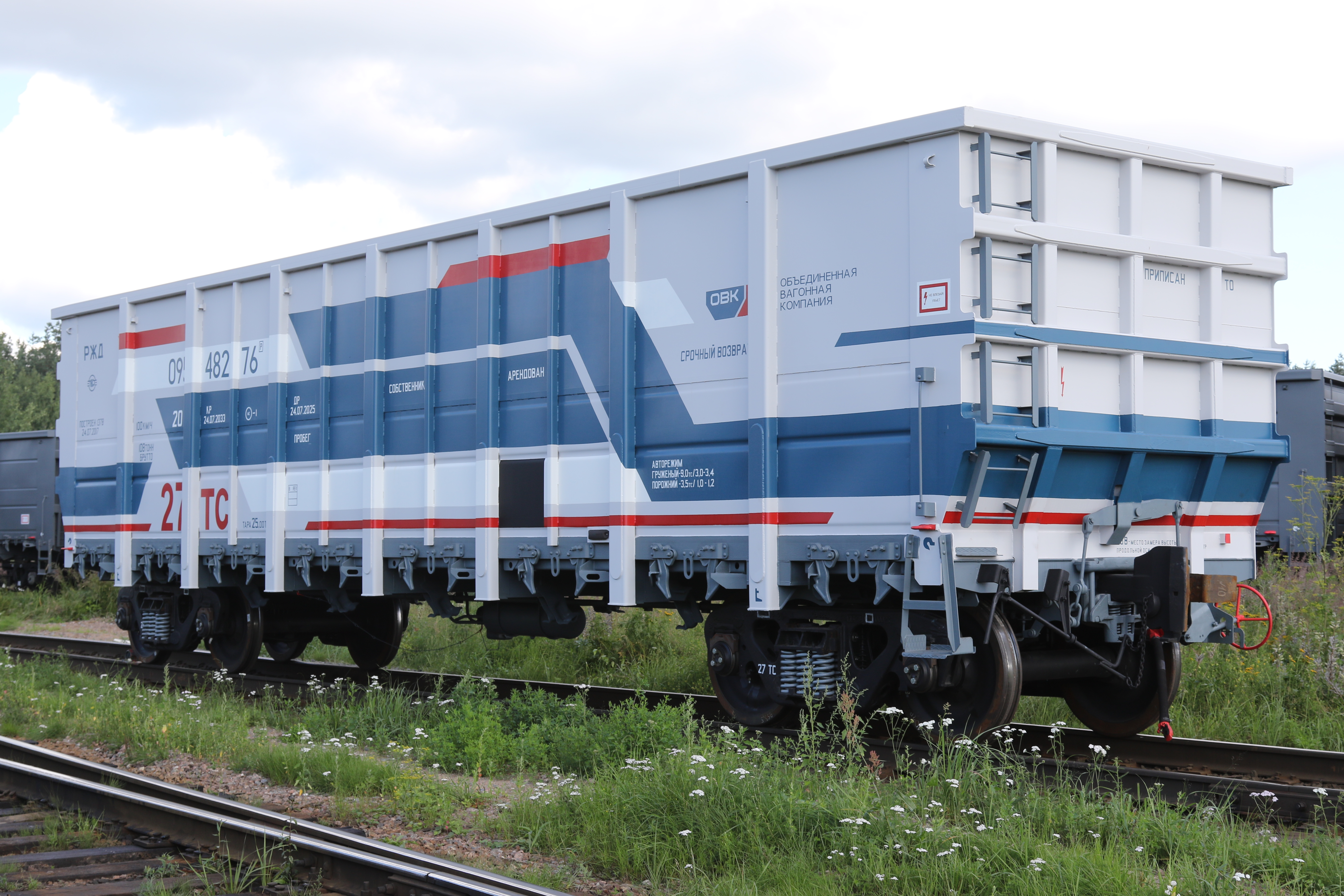
- A railway wagon built by the United Wagon Company
- Native name: ПАО «Научно-производственная корпорация «Объединенная Вагонная Компания», PJSC
- Type: PJSC
- Traded as: MCX: UWGN
- Industry: Transport machine building
- Founded: 2012; 14 years ago
- Headquarters: Moscow, Russia
- Key people: Timofey Khryapov (CEO)
- Products: Freight cars
- Revenue: 64,470 billion Russian ruble (2019)
- Operating income: 7,515,000,000 Russian ruble (2019)
- Net income: 3,135 billion Russian ruble (2019)
- Total assets: 160,474 billion Russian ruble (2019)
- Total equity: 10,63 billion Russian ruble (2019)
- Number of employees: >11,000 (2018)
- Website: www.uniwagon.com/en

United Wagon Company (Russian: ПАО «Научно-производственная корпорация «Объединенная Вагонная Компания») is a major Russian manufacturers of railway freight cars that is headquartered in Moscow.

The company is on the Russian Ministry for Economic Development list of strategically important organizations. The railway holding Research and Production Corporation "United Wagon Company" is engaged in design, manufacturing, leasing and maintenance of freight cars as well as transportation services.

United Wagon Company operates a railway holding comprising a few enterprises located in Leningrad and Udmurtiya region – Tikhvin Freight Car Building Plant, TikhvinChemMash, TikhvinSpetsMash, NPC "Springs", as well as the transport company UNICON 1520, leasing companies under the RAIL1520 brand and the car-repair enterprise TAP "Titran-Express". UWC also oversees its own research & development Center

== History ==
United Wagon Company was established in 2012 to run the activities of Tikhvin Freight Car Building Plant and the leasing company RAIL1520.

The official launch of Tikhvin Freight Car Building Plan took place in January 2012. In July 2014, the plant produced its 10,000th freight car

The freight car leasing company RAIL 1520 was founded in 2011. In January 2012, RAIL1520 started a car leasing joint venture with the Japanese Mitsui – MRC1520. RAIL1520 is in the TOP-10 largest leasing companies of Russia

In September 2013, United Wagon Company and US-based Wabtec signed a joint venture agreement. Several months prior to that, a similar agreement had been signed with Amsted Rail.

In March 2014, UWC and Timken Company (U.S.) announced a joint venture to manufacture cassette bearings.

In April 2014, United Wagon Company set up its own R&D engineering center.

In June 2014, UWC acquired a 100% stake in NPC "Springs" (Izhevsk, Udmurtiya) producer of transport springs.

In the same month, UWC launched a new transport company named Vostok1520 for heavy haul. In November 2016, United Wagon Company sold a 100% stake in Vostok1520 to First Heavyweight Company.

In 2015, UWC and the global supplier of hi-tech products for railways Wabtec (USA) signed a contract for the supply of large car casting to the US market.

In December 2015, UWC launched TikhvinChemMash plant to produce tank cars.

In March 2016, United Wagon Company acquired Tikhvin Assembly Plant "Titran-Express" specialized in maintenance and repair of the rolling stock.

In September 2016, United Wagon Company opened a representative office in the United States Uniwagon North America Corp. (New Jersey).

In October 2016, UWC launched the manufacture of parts made of high-strength isothermally hardened cast iron with the capacity of 30,000 car sets a year.

Late in 2016, the first batch of specialized cars was manufactured at a new plant of the railway holding TikhvinSpetsMash. The facility specializes in the output of various small-scale rolling stock types, including platforms for timber and metal transportation, isothermal cars and dumpcars.

In March 2017, United Wagon Company established UNICON 1520, a transport start-up for container and tank container.

In September 2017, Tikhvin Freight Car Building Plant passed the AAR quality certification procedure at the Association of American Railroads and launched the export shipment of large car casting for North American freight cars.

In August 2018, United Wagon Company won status as supplier to Deutsche Bahn (DB), and in November UWC won DB tender for delivery of flat cars.

In March 2019, United Wagon Company and the TEXOL group, one of Kazakhstan's largest railway operators and freight car fleet owners, have signed a contract on the supply of 400 articulated tank cars for the transportation of liquefied petroleum gas (LPG).

In December 2019, UWC has released the 100,000th freight car produced since the launch of the Tikhvin Freight Car Building Plant in January 2012.

== Finances ==
By the end of 2019, the turnover (earnings) of United Wagon Company amounted to RUB 64,470 billion.

In April 2017 UWC additionally placed 2.2% of shares on the Moscow Stock Exchange in the amount of 1.9 billion rubles. According to the results of the SPO, the company's free float increased to 21.05%.

According to the results of the first half of 2023, UWC revenue increased by 24% year-on-year, and gross profit amounted to 2 billion rubles against a gross loss of 0.3 billion rubles in 2022.

== Membership in national and international associations ==
In 2013, Tikhvin Freight Car Building Plant joined the Union of Car Builders Association, whereas United Wagon Company joined the Association of American Railroads.

Since 2015, United Wagon Company has been a member of the American Society of Mechanical Engineers.

== Owners and management ==
In 2019 the main shareholders were FC Otkritie (24.3%), NPF Future (19.9%), Safmar Group structures (10.4%), Otkritie Holding (7.9%), strategic investors owned 0.7%, 12.5% of shares were in free circulation.

In September 2023 UWC held an additional issue of shares. As a result of the repurchase of new shares, the controlling stake of the company passed to Trust Bank (93.6%).

At the end of 2023 Trust Bank sold a controlling stake (93.6%) in the United Wagon Company to profile investors.

=== General Directors ===
- 2012-2018 Savushkin Roman Alexandrovich
- 2018-2022 Khryapov Timofey Vladimirovich
- 2022-2023 Olyunin Dmitry Yuryevich
- 2023-2024 Limarenko Sergey Vladislavovich
- from February 2024 — Olkhovskaya Irina Vladimirovna
