= Kirov Plant =

Factory in St Petersburg, Russia

Coordinates: 59.878655°N 30.258429°E

Kirov Zavod

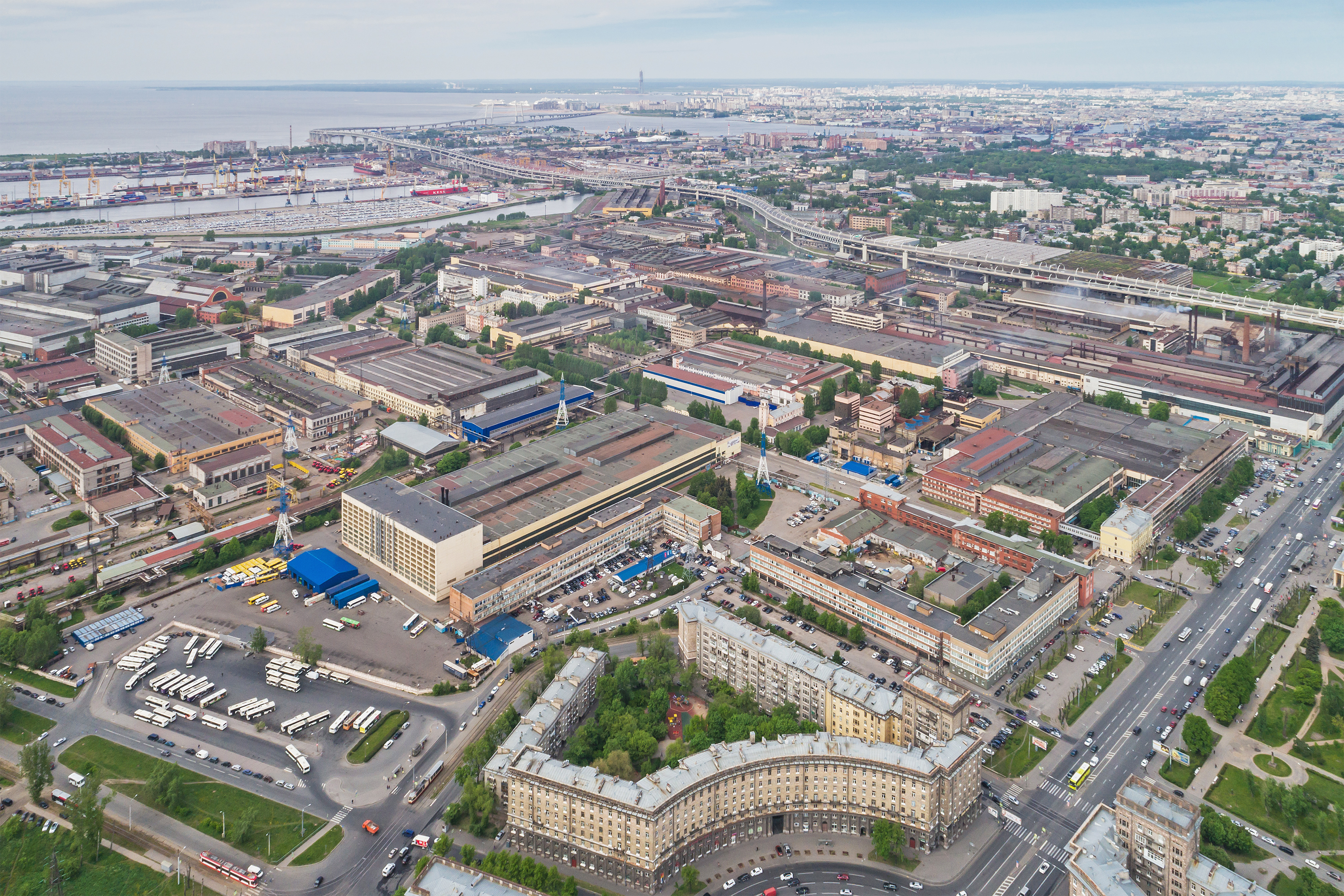
- Aerial view of the Kirov Plant in 2017
- Native name: Кировский завод
- Type: Joint-stock company
- Industry: Mechanical engineering Defense industry Agricultural machinery
- Founded: February 28, 1801
- Founder: Under the decree of emperor Paul I
- Headquarters: Saint Petersburg, Russia
- Area served: Coast Gulf of Finland
- Key people: General director George Semenenko
- Products: Tractors, escalators, artillery etc
- Revenue: $90.9 million (1994)
- Number of employees: 5,900

The Kirov Plant, Kirov Factory, or Leningrad Kirov Plant (LKZ) (Russian: Кировский завод, romanized: Kirovskiy zavod) is a major Russian mechanical engineering and agricultural machinery manufacturing plant in St. Petersburg, Russia. It was established in 1789, then moved to its present site in 1801 as a foundry for cannonballs. The Kirov Plant is sometimes confused with another Leningrad heavy weapons manufacturer, Factory No. 185 (S.M. Kirov). Recently the main production of the company is Kirovets heavy tractors.

In 1917, the factory was an important center of the Red Guards formations.

== History ==
=== Putilov works ===
In 1868, Nikolay Putilov (1820–1880) purchased the bankrupt plant. At the Putilov works, the Putilov Company (a joint-stock holding company from 1873) initially produced rolling stock for railways. The establishment boomed during the Russian industrialization of the 1890s, with the workforce quadrupling in a decade, reaching 12,400 in 1900. The factory traditionally produced goods for the Russian government, with railway products accounting for more than half of its total output. Starting in 1900, it also produced artillery, eventually becoming a major supplier of it to the Imperial Russian Army alongside the state arsenals. By 1917, it grew into a giant enterprise that was by far the largest in the city of Saint Petersburg.

In December 1904, four workers at the plant, then called 'Putilov Ironworks', were fired because of their membership in "Assembly of the Russian Factory and Mill Workers of the City of St. Petersburg" headed by Father Georgy Gapon. However, the plant manager asserted that they were fired for unrelated reasons. Virtually the entire workforce of the Putilov Ironworks went on strike when the plant manager refused to accede to their requests that the workers be rehired. Sympathy strikes in other parts of the city raised the number of strikers up to 150,000 workers in 382 factories. By 21 January [O.S. 8 January] 1905, the city had no electricity and no newspapers whatsoever and all public areas were declared closed. This was the beginning of the series of events which culminated on Sunday, 22 January [O.S. 9 January] 1905 in Saint Petersburg, Russia, when demonstrators, led by Father Georgy Gapon, were fired upon by soldiers of the Imperial Guard as they marched towards the Winter Palace to present a petition to Tsar Nicholas II (Bloody Sunday). The massacre on Bloody Sunday is considered to be the start of the active phase of the Revolution of 1905.

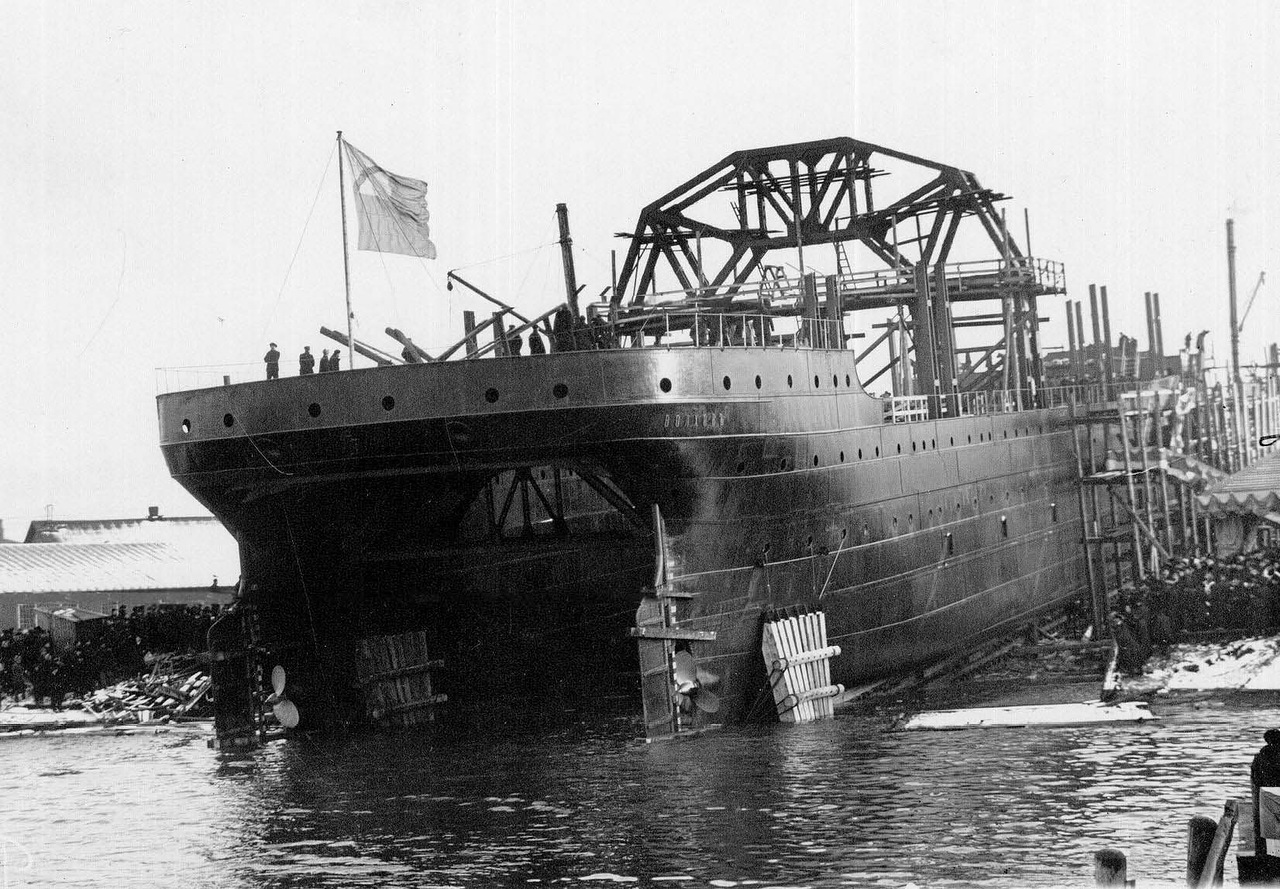
Launch of Volkhov at the Putilov works in November 1913

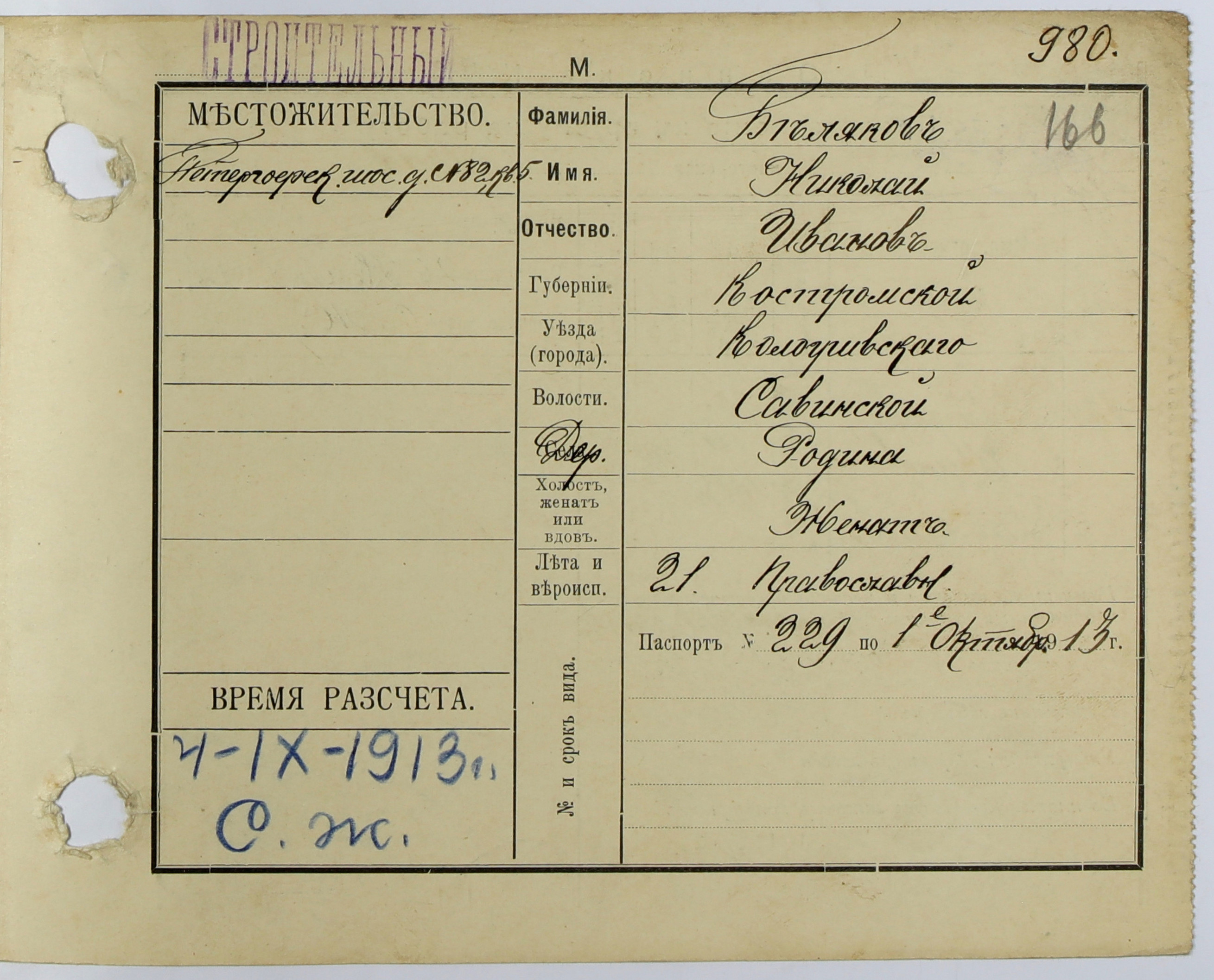
Putilov locomotive-building, machine-building, mechanical and foundry plant of the Joint-Stock Company of Putilov Plants. Personal card of Nikolai Ivanovich Belyakov from Kostroma Governorate, 1913. Front side. CGA SPb

Ships were built at the Putilov works in the early 20th century. The submarine tender Volkhov (later renamed Kommuna), built 1911–1915 at Putilov for the Imperial Russian Navy, remained in service of the Russian Navy in the 2010s.

In February 1917, strikes at the factory contributed to setting in motion the chain of events which led to the February Revolution.

=== Red Putilovite plant ===
After the October Revolution of November 1917, the establishment was renamed Red Putilovite plant (zavod Krasny Putilovets) and became famous for its manufacture of the first Soviet tractors, Fordzon-Putilovets, based on the Fordson tractor.

=== Kirov factory ===
In the wake of the December 1934 assassination of Sergey Kirov, the Leningrad Communist Party head, the plant was renamed Kirov Factory No. 100.

During World War II, the plant manufactured the KV-1 tank.

In 1962, the factory produced the Kirovets K-700 tractor.

The Kirov Plant was de-listed from the Moscow Exchange in 2011.

== Directors of Kirov Plant ==
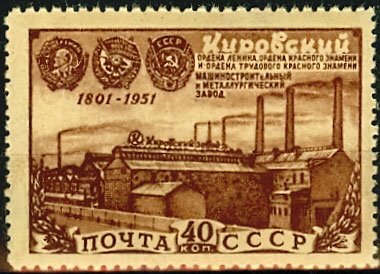
Soviet postage stamp of 1951, commemorating 150 years in operation

- 1917-1919 - Vasilyev, Anton Efimovich, the first "red" director
- 1930-1936 - Ots, Karl Martovich
- 1938-1941 - Zaltsman, Isaac Moiseevich
- 1941-1943 - Dlugach, Moisey Abramovich
- 1945-1948 - Kizima, Alexander Leontyevich
- 1950-1954 - Smirnov, Nikolai Ivanovich
- 1954-1964 - Isaev, Ivan Sergeevich
- 1964-1972 - Lyubchenko, Alexander Alexandrovich
- 1972-1975 - Ulybin, Vasily Ivanovich
- 1975-1976 - Belt, Oleg Nikolaevich
- 1976-1984 - Muranov, Boris Alexandrovich
- 1984-1987 - Chernov, Stanislav Pavlovich
- 1987-2005 - Semenenko, Pyotr Georgievich
- 2005-2022 - Semenenko, Georgy Petrovich
- from 2022 - Serebryako, Sergey Alexandrovich

== See also ==
- List of Soviet tank factories
- Trams of Putilov plant
