= ICT Group =

Call center and outsourcing company

ICT Group, Inc.
- Company type: Public
- Traded as: Nasdaq: ICTG
- Industry: Business process outsourcing
- Founded: 1983; 43 years ago
- Defunct: 2010; 16 years ago
- Headquarters: Newtown, Pennsylvania, United States
- Number of locations: 40 centers (2009)
- Area served: Worldwide
- Services: Call centers
- Revenue: ▲US$453,621,000 (2007)
- Operating income: ▼US$-$7,053,000 (2007)
- Net income: ▼US$-11,809,000 (2007)
- Total assets: ▲US$225,600,000 (2007)
- Total equity: ▲US$167,189,000
- Number of employees: 18,000 (2009)

ICT Group, Inc. was a multinational call center and outsourcing company based in the Philadelphia suburb of Newtown.

During the Great Recession, ICT closed call centers in the United States and Canada; it also reduced staff numbers in the United Kingdom, Ireland and Australia, as part of a plan to move its operations to lower-wage countries.

On February 2, 2010, ICT was acquired by Sykes Enterprises, Inc., a Tampa-based company.
