= Yacht tender =

Boat used for servicing larger racing or cruising pleasure craft

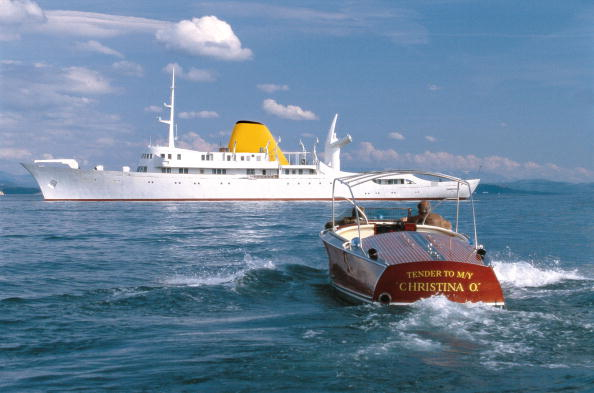
A classic Hacker-Craft, tender to Christina O

A yacht tender is a vessel used for servicing and providing support and entertainment to a private or charter yacht. They include utilitarian craft, powered by oar or outboard motor, and high-speed luxury craft, supporting superyachts, powered by inboard engines, some using water-jets. Some superyachts have a support vessel that follows them with bulky items that are not conveniently stowed aboard the main yacht, such as a helicopter, automobile or larger watercraft.

== History ==
In the early 20th century multiple builders were developing wooden powered yacht tenders, equipped with naphtha steam engines or gasoline motors. By 1929 Chris Craft was building mahogany tenders with powerful inboard engines.

== Types ==
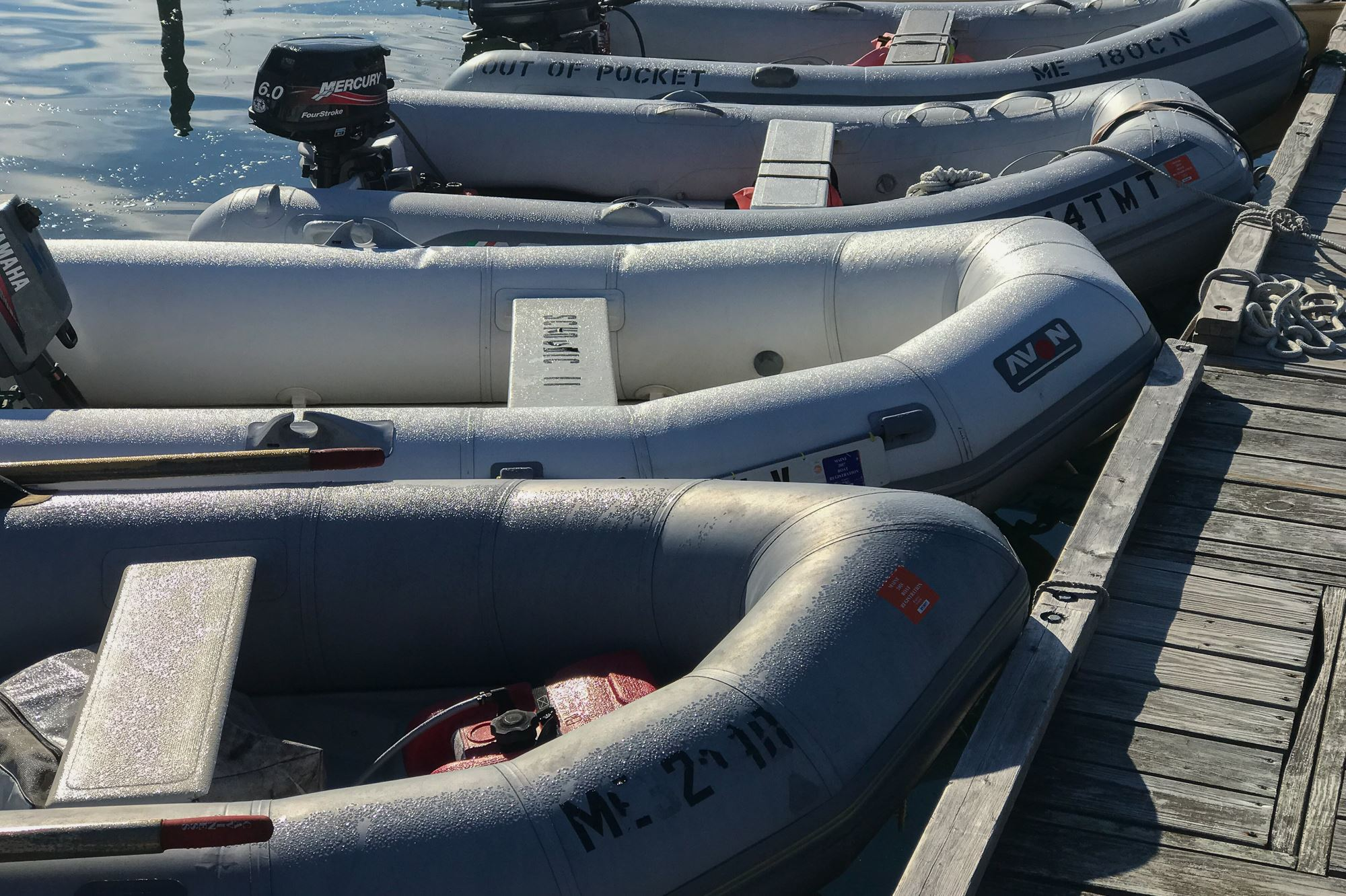
Inflatable yacht tenders tied to a finger dock.

Tenders may be towed behind a yacht, if they are light and towed at a low speed, or lifted on board, if they are heavy enough to cause damage in a collision or when the vessel cruises at too high a speed for towing. The type of tender varies, according to the size of the yacht served, although yachts of all sizes are may have one or more rigid-hulled inflatable boats (RIBs). Yacht tenders like other types of ship's tender, may transport supplies and personnel or be used for the entertainment and pleasure of a yacht's passengers.

The smallest sailing yachts—7 metres (23 ft) and below—must tow their tenders, which are typically dinghies. Larger yachts may have davits to lift the tender out of the water, typically above the transom; this would be a typical approach for a motor yacht, which cannot tow a tender at its cruise speed. Other storage schemes are storage on the deck or on the cabin. Bigger tenders of small yachts may be a gig or a dory. Multifunction dinghies have recently become available as yacht tenders. These unsinkable dinghies can be rowed, motored, or sailed, and they also function as proactive lifeboats. Tenders are usually motor powered by outboard motor engines or inboard engines burning either petrol/gasoline or diesel.

=== For superyachts ===
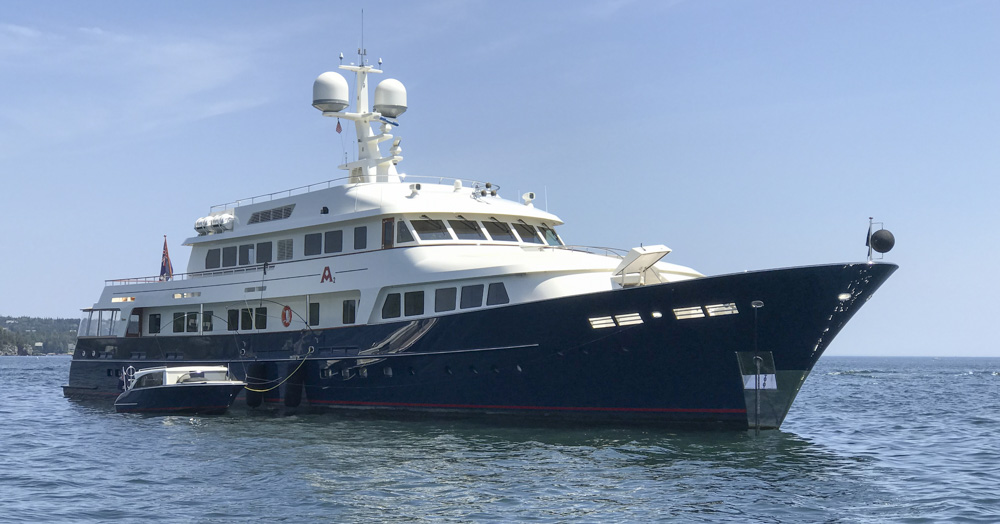
Feadship yacht, A2, with Hodgdon Yachts Venetian-style limo tender

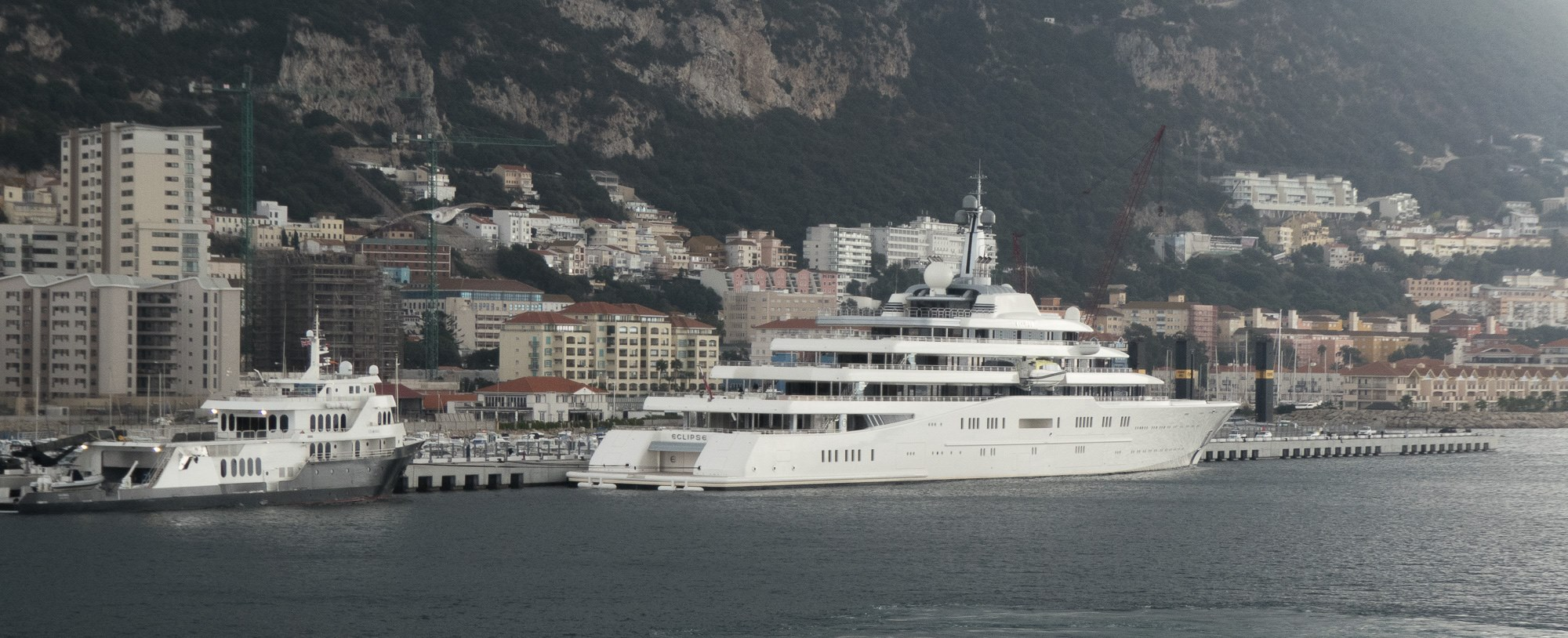
Superyacht, Eclipse, with a support vessel

Superyachts exceed 24 metres (79 ft) in length. Their tenders come in a variety of styles that include classic, modern, sedan, and RIB. Many are capable of speeds of up to 60 knots (110 km/h). Superyachts often feature stern garages, which house the tender and other water toys. Superyacht tenders include classic-influenced boats (such as mahogany runabouts), custom made luxury tenders, and support vessels that follow (shadow) the yacht.

Superyachts may have one or more large custom tenders in one of an assortment of styles with inboard engines and driven either by propellers or jetboat impellers. Long established custom builders such as Hodgdon Yachts and Vikal International, have developed high-end limousine tenders and specialized multi purpose tenders. Tenders may serve as pleasure craft or speed boats to drag bananas and for waterskiing, wakeboarding and also to transport and service leisure scuba set diving.

Superyacht tender variants include the small personal hovercraft, such as the Hov Pod, or the amphibious boat, such as Iguana Yachts "Commuter", which can also drive onto beaches or up ramps, to carry passengers on land.

Superyacht owners who elect to tow their tenders weigh the convenience of the tender not occupying space in the yacht against the risk of loss of the towed vessel. Towing also allows for more elaborate and larger tenders than those stowed internally or on davits. Rigging a tow requires specialized expertise. Insurers require a tracking system, in case a towing rig fails.

==== Support vessel ====
Superyachts may be accompanied by a support (or shadow) vessel that carries such items as watercraft, helicopters or other large items that the yacht, itself, cannot readily accommodate. Such vessels range in length from 20 to 100 metres (66 to 328 ft). There are at least four manufacturers that specialize in building such vessels. One 67-metre (220 ft) example included the following amenities: a helicopter deck, six guest rooms, two-story helicopter hangar with sound system, movie theater, freshwater pool, a landing craft, four each of: jet skis, kayaks, sailboats, diving and fishing gear, and water skis. For use ashore there were reportedly a two-seater automobile, two motor scooters and two bicycles. The vessel also featured a 35-short-ton (32,000 kg) crane.

== See also ==
- Ship's tender
