= North Haven Dinghy =

Sailboat class

The North Haven Dinghy is the oldest continually raced one-design sailboat class in America. Originally designed around 1885–1887, its creation marked the birth of the "one-design" racing concept, where all boats are constructed to identical specifications. This shift ensured that a race's outcome was decided purely by the skipper's sailing skill rather than expensive gadgetry or hull modifications. The fleet remains active around Penobscot Bay, Maine. Summer racing series are overseen by the North Haven yacht club. The class national championship culminates in the Mill River Race, famous for fickle breezes, tight rocky channels, and spectacular island backdrops. Preservation and public accessibility to the fleet are actively managed by the North Haven Dinghy Foundation.

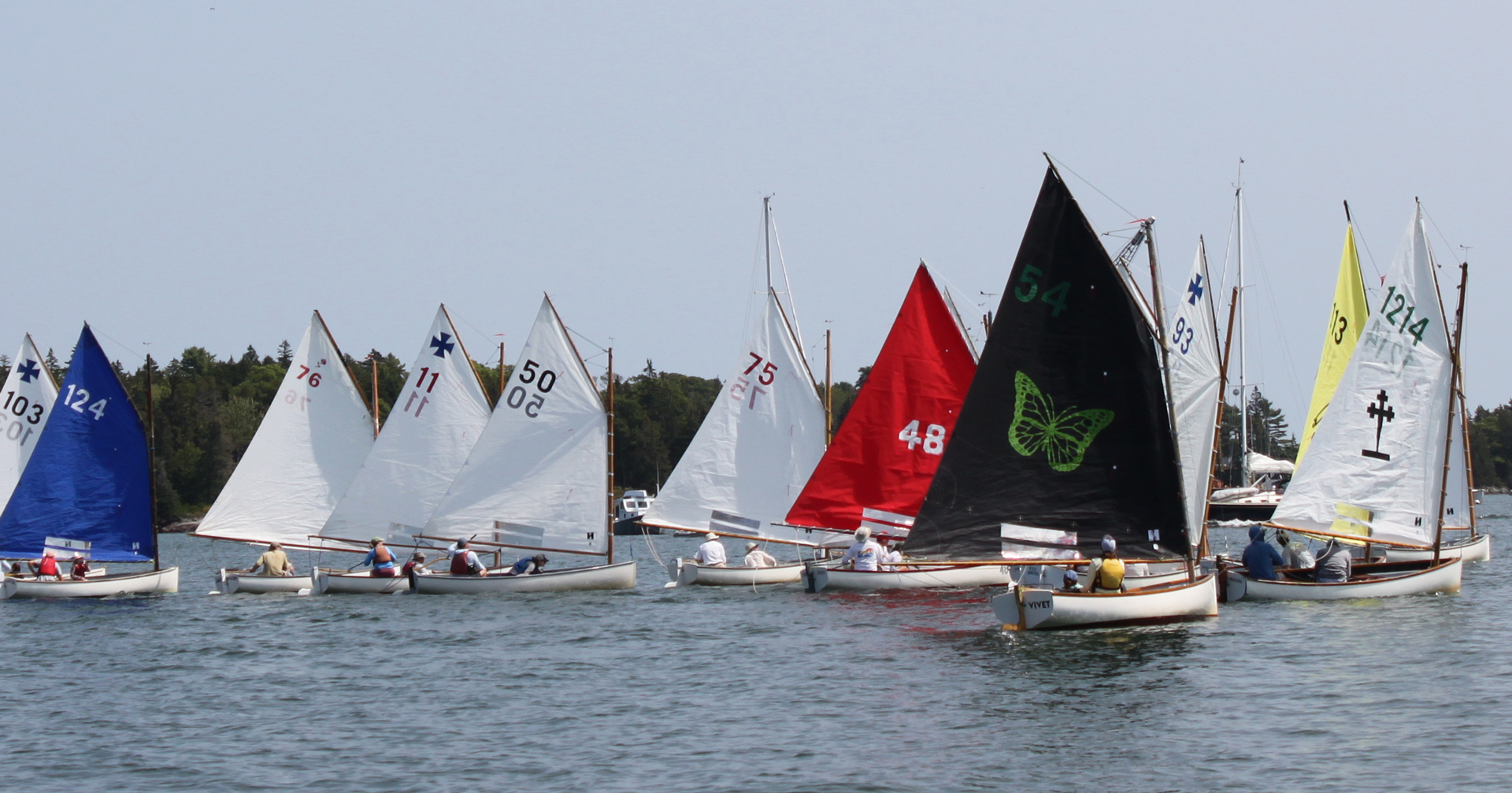

== Design and specifications ==
The boat was originally adapted from a yacht tender carried by William Weld's schooner, Gitana, and refined by North Haven, Maine, boatbuilder James O. Brown. Despite its small footprint, it handles with the heft of a much larger vessel due to integrated heavy ballast.

- Hull Type: Gaff-rigged catboat featuring a distinct wineglass stern and an oversized rudder.
- Length: 14 feet, 5 inches.
- Beam: 4 feet, 10 inches.
- Draft: 1 foot, 3 inches (board up) to 3 feet, 4 inches (board down).
- Construction: Traditionally built with cedar planking over oak frames. Modern class rules permit fiberglass hulls, provided they carry internal ballast to match the exact weight, center of gravity, and performance characteristics of the traditional hulls.
- Ballast: The boat carries approximately 350 lb (159 kg) of inside lead ballast and a heavy, lead-weighted oak centerboard. This significant ballast gives the small dinghy the momentum and handling characteristics of a much larger keelboat.

== Legacy ==
The North Haven Dinghy holds a unique space in maritime lore, dating back to the first "Grand Dinghy Race" held in August 1887. In that debut, an inexperienced sailor named Ellen Hayward defeated two seasoned male competitors, establishing a 140-year legacy of inclusive local racing.
