= Byrds of Paradise Isle =

Comic

The Byrds of Paradise Isle was a story appearing regularly in Buster comic from 1 July 1978 to 29 March 1980. It was drawn in a 'realistic' comic style by Andrew Wilson.

== Premise ==
The Byrd family, Tom, and Ethel, and their two boys, Richard 'Dickie' and Basil, and Grannie, live in Birmingham, and are facing eviction. On the day of their eviction, they receive a letter saying that Tom's long-lost cousin has died in Australia, and has left them an Island in the South Pacific to live on. They fly to Australia, then take a banana boat to the island, to discover it's not the paradise they expected.
