= Iguana Yachts =

French boat manufacturer

- Type: Société par actions simplifiée
- Industry: Shipyard
- Founded: 15 July 2008
- Founder: Antoine Brugidou
- Headquarters: Bréhal, France
- Area served: Worldwide
- Key people: Antoine Brugidou
- Products: Luxury amphibious boats
- Website: Iguana Yachts website

Iguana Yachts is a French company created in 2008, specialized in design and manufacturing of boats. The main facilities and shipyards are located in Normandy, France. The company produces amphibious motorboats featuring all-terrain tracks.

== History ==
The shipyard was created in 2008 by Antoine Brugidou, former Vice President of Accenture, in association with the naval architect Tanguy Le Bihan and the designers (Fritsch & associés). Antoine Brugidou wanted to create a well-performing luxury boat with all-terrain capabilities. To fit these requirements, Antoine Fritsch designed the Iguana Mobility System which enables the hull to carry the mobility system. In marine conditions, the track system is integrated in the hull and deployed (via a 90° rotation) on the ground. The tracks (which are adapted to sand and mud and built from an internal material resistant to corrosion), enable the boat to land on most of the surfaces from slopes (up to 12° angle), to sand, mud, or rocky beaches. After three years of development and two prototypes, Iguana Yachts launched the serial production in Caen using local expertise. The project was funded by several business angel networks (Arts et Métiers Business Angels, ESSEC Business Angels, Paris Business Angels, XMP Business Angels) and, with their help, the first 24 ft boat was launched 2012. At the same time, production lines were designed and the company ran a stand in the international boat shows. The serial production was launched right after the show and the first luxury boat was sold in 2013, in Bahrain. The amphibious boat also attracts investors specialized in military and professional endeavors (e.g. firemen).

== Iguana Yachts today ==
Today, Iguana Yachts production is made up of 29 ft boats, equipped with 300 HP outboard motors . They can reach 35 knots on sea and 7 km/h on earth.

The aluminum landing gear connected to the carbon fiber hull can provide fatigue resistance and has the purpose of improving performance. The Iguana 29 are used as tender yachts and as day boats for owners of beach villas. The last fundraising (end of 2013) brought 1.2 million Euros from several private investors to ensure the further development of the Plan.
