= Runabout (boat) =

Boat type

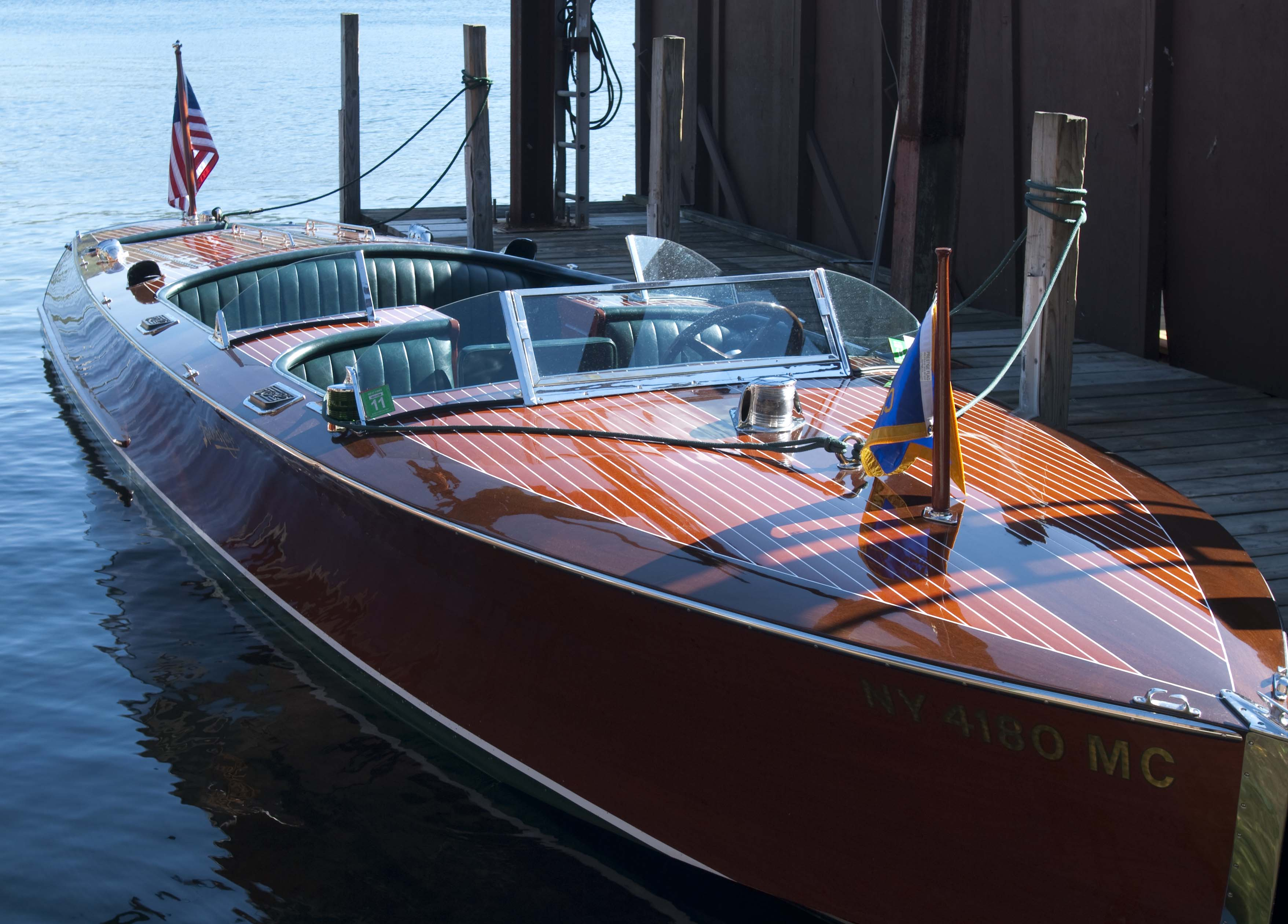
A 2010 Hacker-Craft triple cockpit runabout

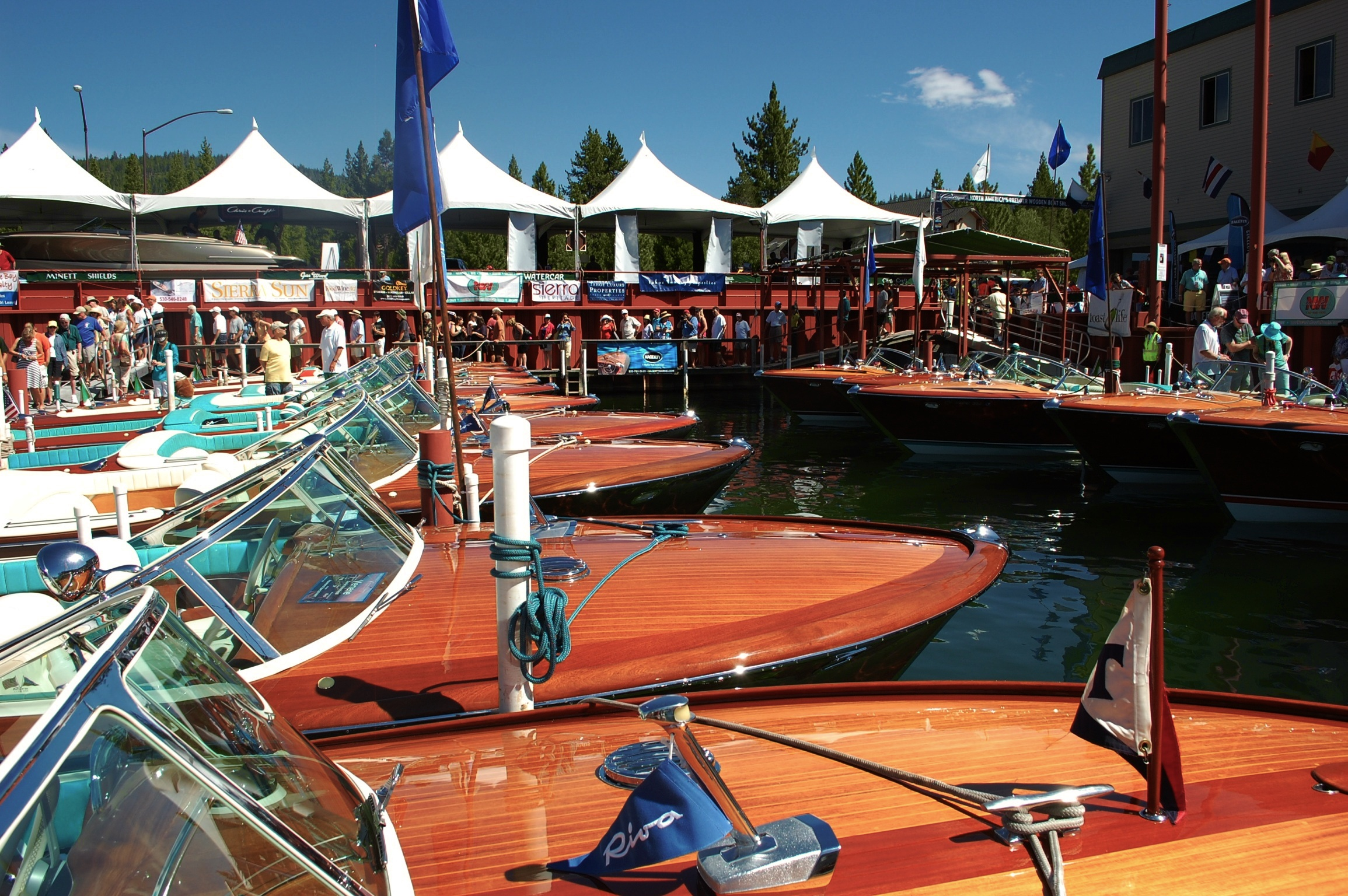
The bows of several Riva Aquaramas and Aristans, an Aquarama in center

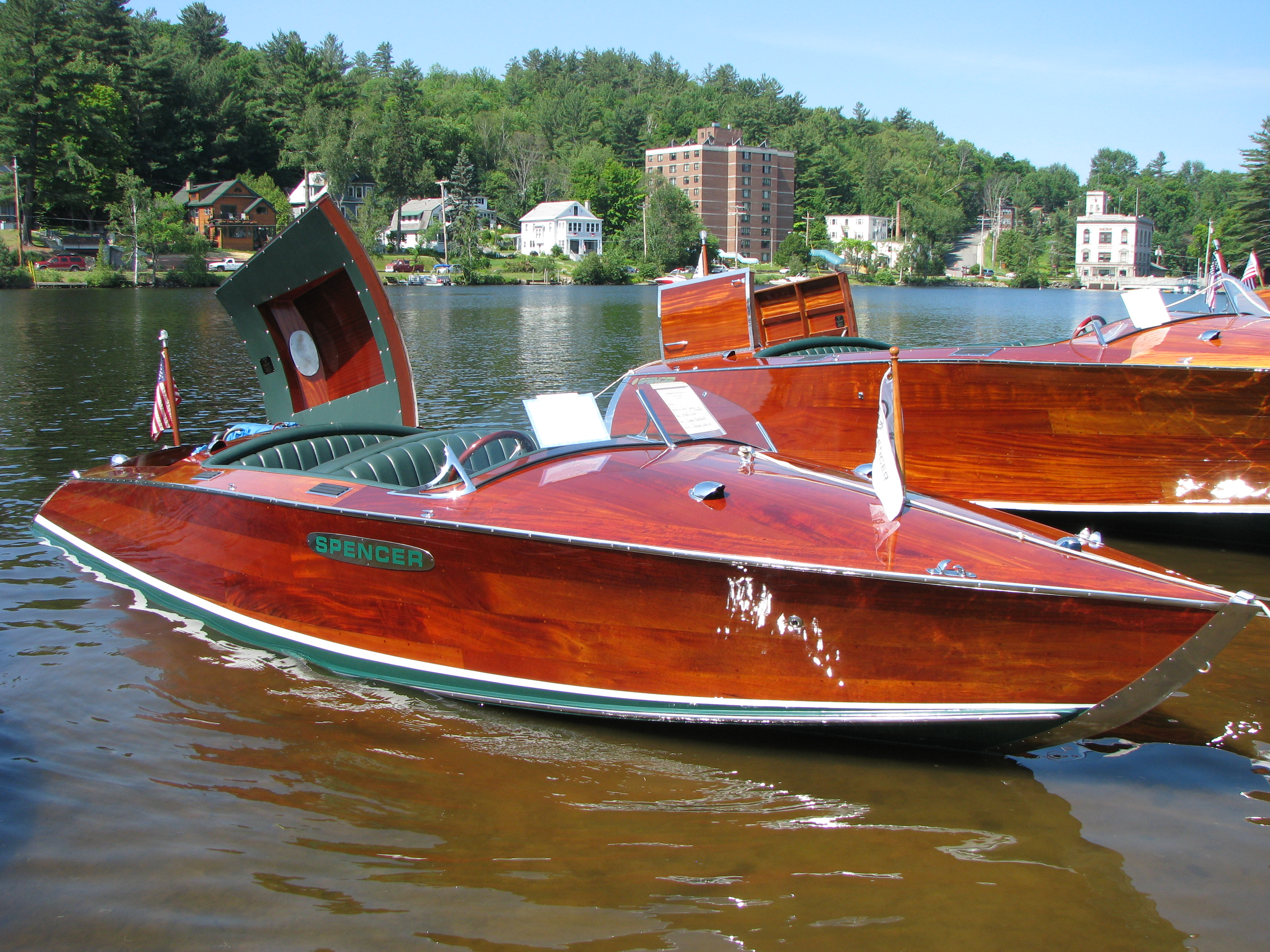
2004, 22-foot (6.7 m) Spencer Runabout, 380 hp Crusader engine, Spencer Boatworks, Saranac Lake, New York

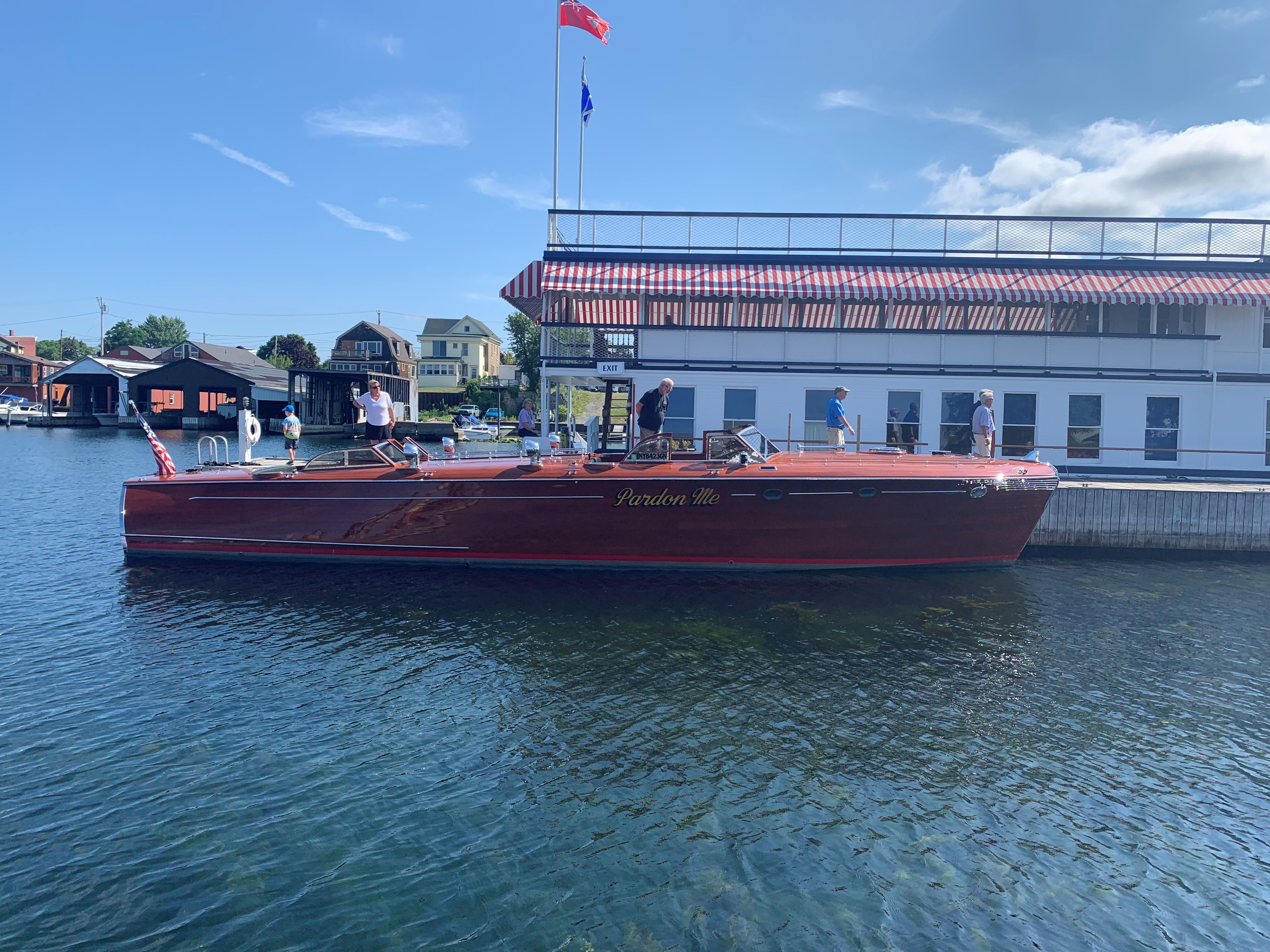
The 48-foot (15 m) Hackercraft Pardon Me built by Hutchinson Boat Works of Alexandria Bay, New York

A runabout is any small motorboat holding between four and eight people, well suited to moving about on the water. Characteristically between 6 metres (20 ft) and 11 metres (36 ft) in length, runabouts are used for pleasure activities like boating, fishing, and water skiing, as a ship's tender for larger vessels, or in racing. Some common runabout types are bow rider, center console, cuddy boat and walkaround. The world's largest runabout, Pardon Me, is slightly less than 15 metres (49 ft) long and owned by the Antique Boat Museum in Clayton, New York.

== History ==
The first runabouts date back to the 1920s and were originally small, fast, powerful, varnished, wooden boats created to take advantage of the power of outboard motors such as the first Evinrude, introduced in 1909.

In order to gain speed, the hull shape had to be designed to take advantage of hydroplaning; a hydrofoil-like design would allow the boat to skim atop the water's surface at high speed instead of needing to push aside large quantities of water to move forward. Another design change which followed soon after was the replacement of the tiller and rudder control with a rudder controlled by a steering wheel, allowing the operator a comfortable forward-facing position. A remote lever to allow the engines to be placed into a reverse gear was another early innovation.

Among the leading builders of 1920s runabouts was John L. Hacker, who founded the Hacker Boat Company in 1908. Hacker was a pioneering naval architect who developed many design innovations, like the 'V-bottom'. His designs became the model upon which virtually all subsequent runabouts were based.

Shortly, similar upscale varnished-wood runabouts by Gar Wood and Chris-Craft and were also available, fitted with windshields to protect the cockpits and up to 400 hp (300 kW) Liberty V-12 marinized surplus World War I aero engines built for speed.

But by the late 1940s, Gar Wood had stopped producing boats, and by the 1960s Chris-Craft was moving to the more modern materials of plastic and fiberglass. Hackercraft, with multiple changes in ownership, continued on.

The mahogany runabouts built by Italian builder Carlo Riva in the late 1950s and the 1960s are considered by many to be premier European examples of the type. The most famous Riva of all time was the Carlo Riva design called the Aquarama Special.

== Construction and materials ==
Originally, runabouts were made entirely of wood, with mahogany used for hulls and planking and oak for framing. The use of aluminium in small boat construction came soon after World War II because of availability of aircraft materials as war surplus. Fiberglass was then introduced as another way to reduce the maintenance, cost and weight of watercraft. Given the cost benefits and personal enjoyment of boat building, do-it-yourself ′Kit Boats′ were also introduced using plywood material. In 1955, Chris-Craft created The Plywood Boat Division which marketed both Kit and pre-built plywood craft.

By 1960, wooden powerboats had become rare since most new vessels used fiberglass or other lightweight materials, including fiber reinforced plastic materials to reduce weight and maximize speed, particularly in racing craft. The art of boatbuilding in wood has been largely lost since it requires a level of craftsmanship impossible in large scale production boat building. One exception is the Hacker Boat Company, which continues to produce mahogany boats on the shores of Lake George, New York. Other wooden boatbuilders include Graf, J-Craft, and Boesch.

== Propulsion ==
Runabouts can be powered by inboard engines, outboards, jet drives, or inboard-outboard (I/O) drives. Engines can be gasoline or diesel systems.

Inboards have the engine block permanently mounted within the hull of the boat, with a drive shaft and a propeller to drive the craft underneath the hull, and a separate rudder to steer the craft.

Outboards are steerable external drive motors containing the engine block, linkage gears, and propeller within a single unit, taking the place of a rudder. Outboard drives are mounted to the transom and steered by a remote system leading to a wheel mounted on the boat's console.

Inboard-Outboard (or stern drives) are a hybrid, with an engine block mounted within the hull linked to a pivotable lower drive unit which steers the craft, similar to an outboard motor.

Jet Drives have a propeller enclosed in a pump-jet that draws water from underneath the hull and expels it through a swiveling nozzle in the stern. They are highly maneuverable and tolerant of shallow water, but need larger engines and use more fuel than the other alternatives.
