= Carlo Riva =

Italian motorboat designer

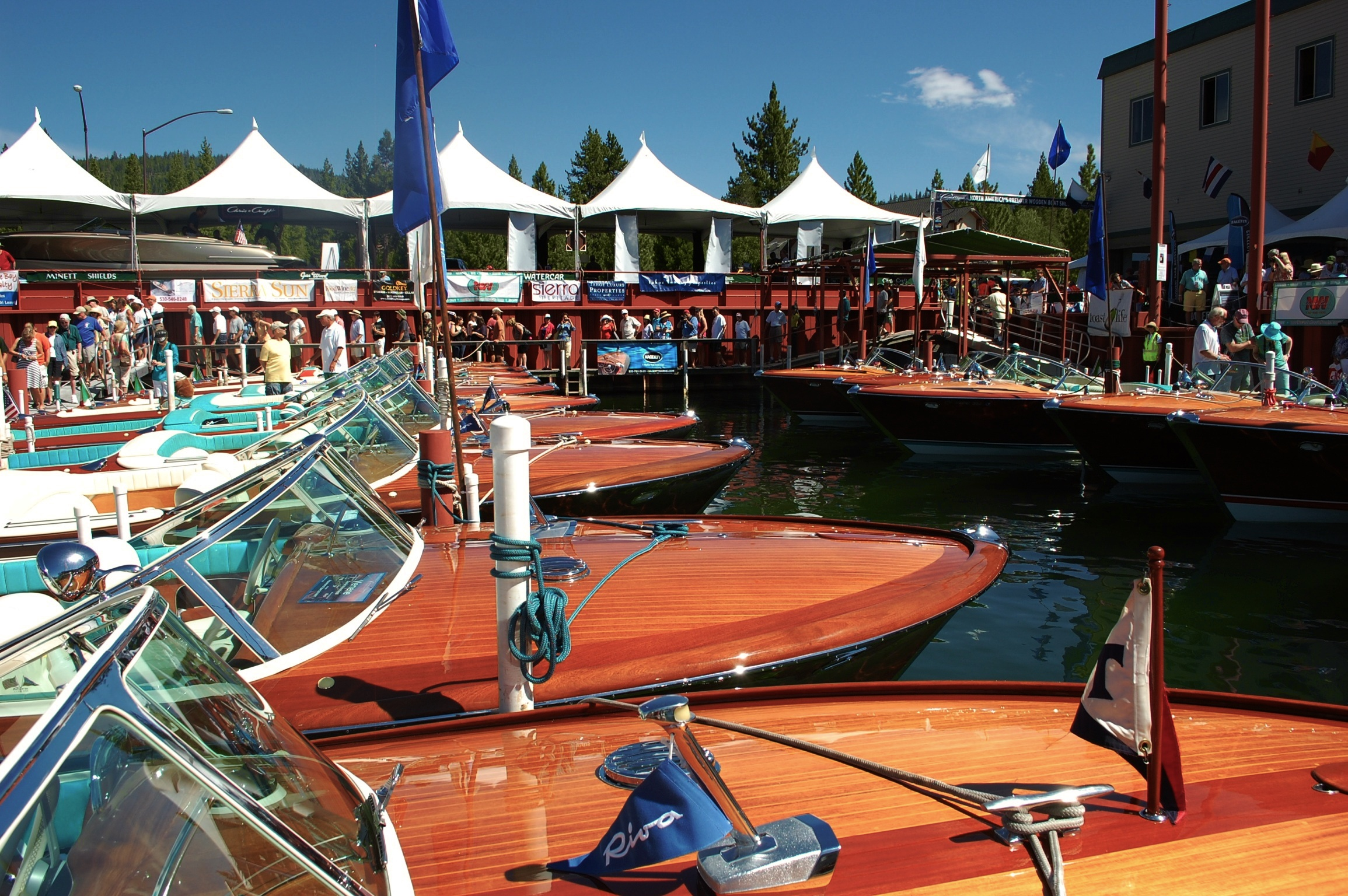
The bows of several Riva Aquaramas and Aristans, an Aquarama in center

Carlo Riva (24 February 1922 – 10 April 2017) was an Italian motorboat designer and builder, famed for his luxurious runabouts.

The runabouts built by Italian builder Carlo Riva are considered by many to be premier European examples of the type. The most famous Riva of all time was the Carlo Riva design called the Aquarama Special.

Riva's history dates back to 1842, when Pietro Riva began building boats at Sarnico, a small northern Italian town on the shores of Lago d’Iseo. By the 1930s the business was managed by Pietro's grandson, Serafino, and the company had become a leading manufacturer of small racing boats, many of which he raced himself. At the same time it began building pleasure boats. In the 1950s Serafino's son Carlo transformed the business, and in due course the Riva brand became a worldwide legend sought out by screen stars, royalty and businessmen alike. Famous customers included Shah of Iran, Brigitte Bardot, Sophia Loren, Peter Sellers and many more besides. A succession of owners have owned the company since Carlo Riva sold it in the early 1970s, and today the firm is owned by the Ferretti Group.

== Monte Carlo Offshorer ==
After selling the Riva yard, Carlo Riva was part of the creation of the "Monte Carlo Offshorer" brand. Developed together with Bob Hopps and Cal Connell, the Monte Carlo Offshorer 27 (70s), 30 (80s) and 32 (early 90s) was the first production runabout with a "stepped" hull to improve ride and stability. The boats were built by RAM - the maintenance part of the former Riva company, still owned by the Riva family.

The Monte Carlo Superfast Offshorer 27 (1970s), 30 (1980s) and 32 (early 1990s) was built out of fibre glass and was the first production runabout with a "stepped" hull to improve ride and stability. Its engines were centreline mounted with heavy duty chain drives transmitting torque to port or starboard mounted marine gearboxes. The V drives were mounted well forward and powered shallow angle propeller shafts using Radice props. This drive arrangement helped keep the boat's centre of gravity much lower than conventional side-by-side-mounted engines, which contributed to its handling efficiency. Cal Connell was responsible for this system's engineering, and Bob Hobbs developed the hull form with assistance from Connell. The engines and fittings were mostly by Crusader, the same as those used on Rivas at the time. Most of the Monte Carlo 30 Offshorer used 2 Crusader 454s, which allowed them to reach 55 knots in standard configuration. The boats were built by RAM – the maintenance operation of the former Riva company, still owned by the Riva family.

About 400 Monte Carlo 30s were built—they mostly replaced Aquarama Specials on the Riviera or were used as yacht tenders.

A Monte Carlo 30 Offshorer driven by James Bond appears in the movie GoldenEye.

== Riva Aquariva ==
Aquariva continues the Aquarama heritage into the 2000s with elegant sinuous lines, the use of precious woods, and all-around attention to detail. Performance, however, is no longer on a par with luxury, the model being offered solely with diesel engines that leave it significantly slower than its predecessors.
