= Bow rider =

Boat type

Example bow rider boat

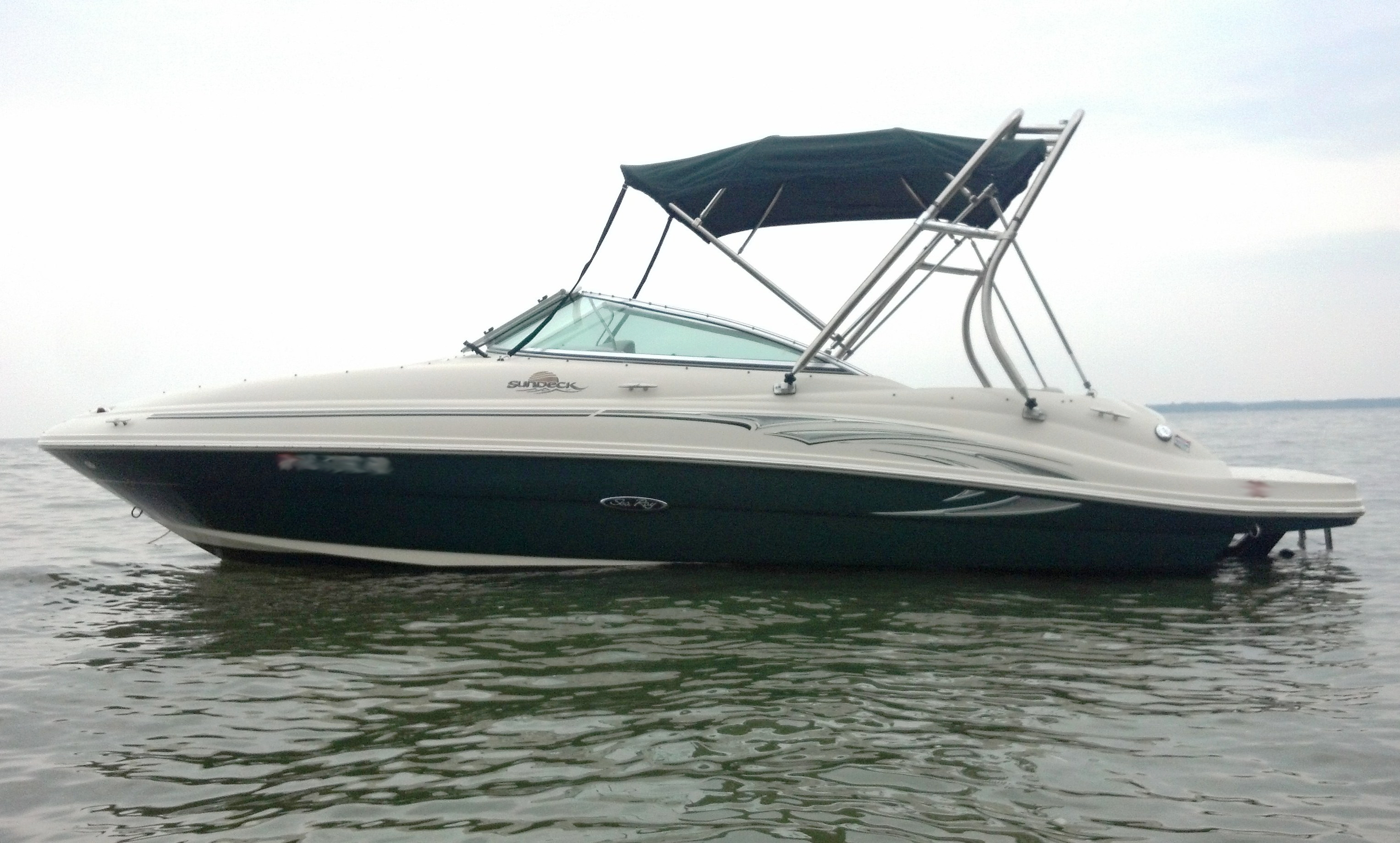
2005 Sea Ray 220 Sundeck, a large bow rider designed for use on inland waterways

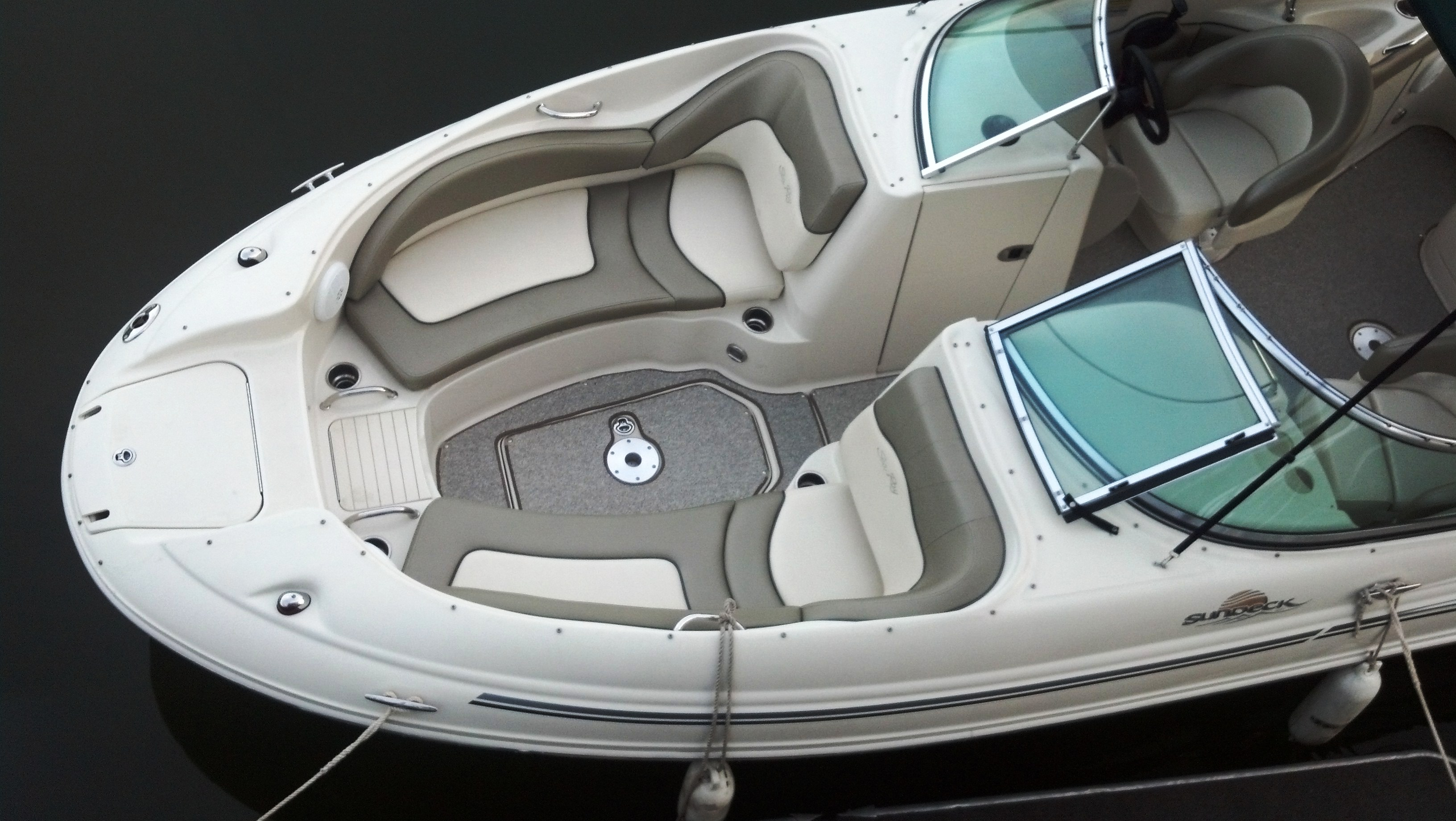
Bow rider area of the 2005 Sea Ray 220 Sundeck

A bow rider is a kind of runabout boat with an offset helm and extra forward seating. They are between 17 and 35 feet (5 and 11 m), use stern drive or outboard engines, and hold between six and ten people. Its open bow area distinguishes it from a cuddy boat.

This term can be confused with bow riding, a dangerous and often illegal activity involving sitting or standing on the bow while the boat is underway.

They are well suited for many recreational water sports such as tubing, water skiing, and swimming; however, a center console or walkaround type boat is more practical for fishing. Bow riders are well suited for lakes and inland water. In heavy seas, the open bow and lower gunwales may cause heavy spray, and the boat can take on water.

== Characteristics ==
A bow rider or bowrider is a type of boat which has a seating area in the bow, the forward part of the vessel. Bow riders are generally designed for recreational use such as day cruising or water skiing, and come in a variety of styles and features.

On a bow rider, the area in front of the helm can be used for seating or lounging. Protective rails designed to prevent falls are installed, along with seats which may include seat belts, depending on the boat design. A flat deck is designed with a nonslip surface so that people can walk comfortably, and some bow riders have enough space for people to stretch out and lie down, with people using the area as a sun pad.

This type of runabout boat is powered by a variety of types of engine, depending on the size of the boat and the style. The design is best suited to inland waterways and calm lakes. Like other runabouts, a bow rider lacks accommodations such as sleeping berths, a galley, and a bathroom, since it is intended for short day use only.
