= Hacker-Craft =

Boat manufacturing company

Hacker Boat Co.
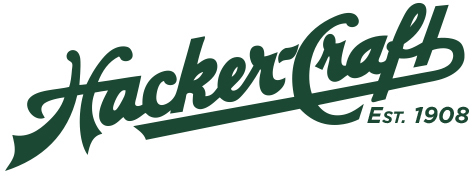

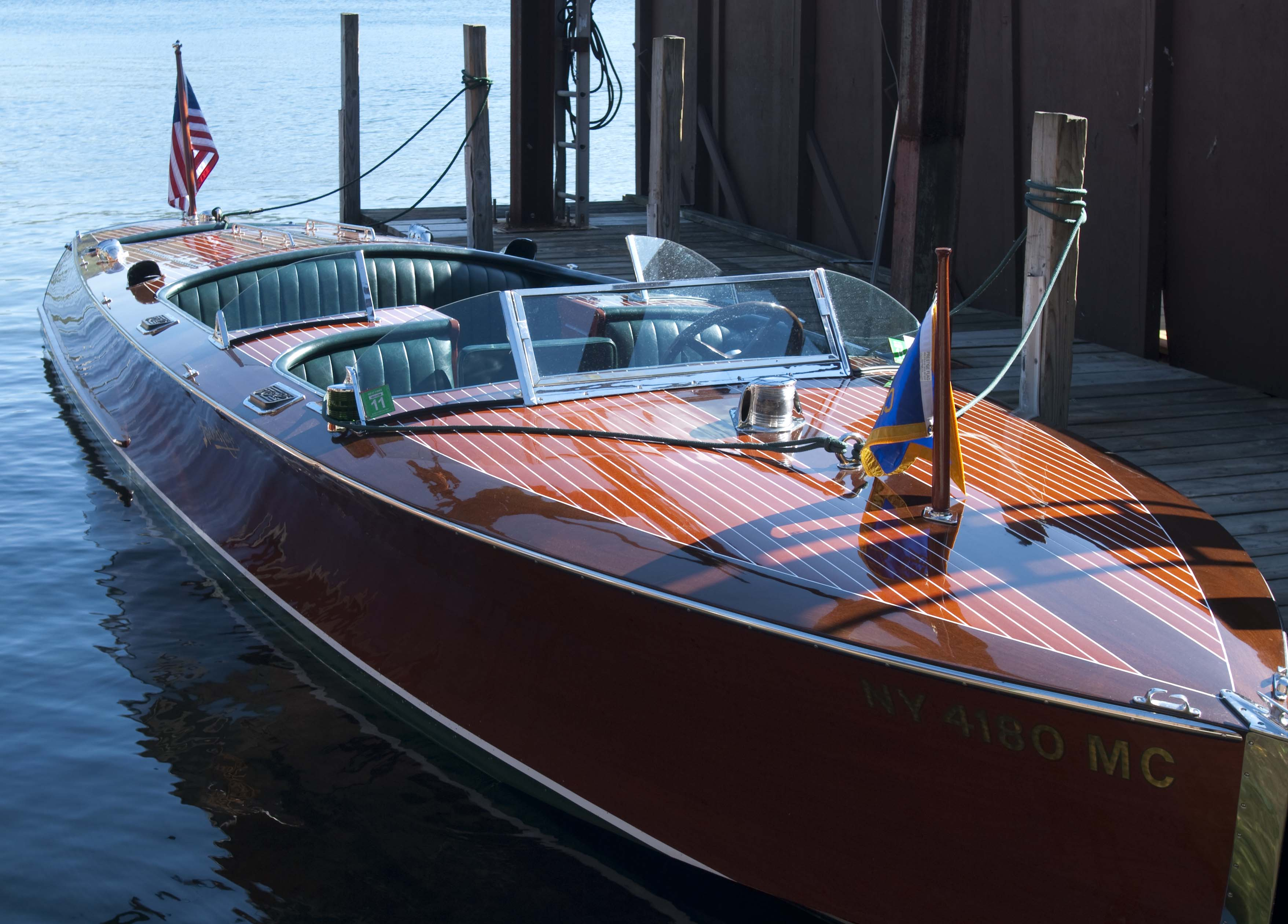
- Hacker-Craft triple cockpit runabout (2004)
- Type: Private company
- Industry: Boatbuilder
- Founded: 1908
- Founder: John L. Hacker
- Headquarters: Queensbury, New York, United States
- Area served: Worldwide
- Products: Motor Boats, Runabouts, Tenders, Racers
- Website: www.hackerboat.com

Hacker-Craft is the name given to boats built by The Hacker Boat Co., an American manufacturer founded in Detroit, Michigan, in 1908 by John L. Hacker (1877–1961). It is one of the oldest constructors of wooden motor boats in the world. The company moved operations to New York State in the 1970s and continues to produce hand-built boats.

Hacker was a naval architect and American motorboat designer. His major design and engineering accomplishments include the invention of the "V"-hull design and the floating biplane for the Wright brothers. The company was known for its runabouts, utilities, commuters, and tenders.

== John L. Hacker, the early years ==
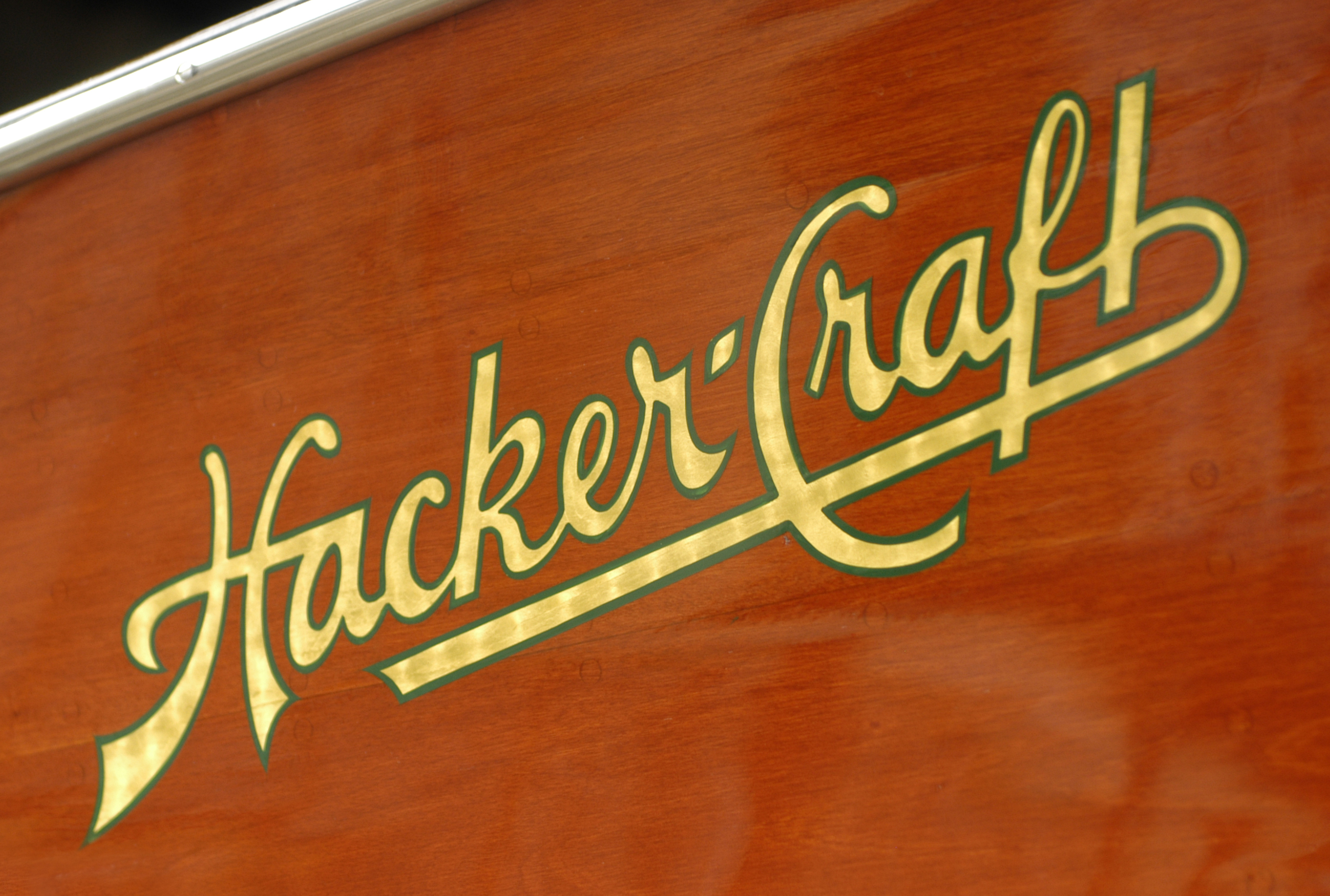
Hacker-Craft's logo, hand-painted in gold leaf on the side of a mahogany runabout

Hacker was born in Detroit, Michigan on May 24, 1877. For four years, while working at his father's business as a bookkeeper, he attended night school and took a correspondence course in order to become an accredited marine designer. Once qualified (at the age of 22) he set about solving a number of problems that inhibited speed and performance in motor boats. Pleasure boats of the 1900 era were narrow, round bottomed launches that plowed through the water instead of planing over it as boats do nowadays. Hacker's first major task in boat design was to try to solve the problem of "squatting", which occurred with all the canoe-stern shaped powerboats of the 1900s. His theory was that if his boats were going to go fast, they would have to "plane" rather than plow through the water, but the tendency to plane was considered an unsafe mode that was to be avoided. Nonetheless, he built a test craft to prove his new theories—a 30-foot (9.1 m) runabout. The boat's propeller and rudder were mounted under the transom and a strut was used to position the propeller shaft. The boat also featured Hacker's revolutionary "V"-hull design, which produced stunning speed and efficiency at low horsepower.

In 1904, he designed Au Revoir, the fastest boat in the world at the time, and on August 12, 1908, building on this success, he founded the Hacker Boat Company in Detroit, upon purchasing and renaming an existing firm, the Detroit Launch and Power Company. Coincidentally, this was the same day on which the first ever Model T Ford automobile was produced by his friend, Henry Ford.

Hacker's designs led to many advances that today's boat owners take for granted. His combination of design flair and engineering brilliance led him to create the shape and style that was to become the signature look of American speedboats. The names of his designs include Pardon Me, the Minute Man, Thunderbird, El Lagarto, Bootlegger, Peerless, Dolphin, Kitty Hawk, Tempo VI, the Belle Isle Bear Cats, Lockpat II, and My Sweetie.

== The birth of speed ==
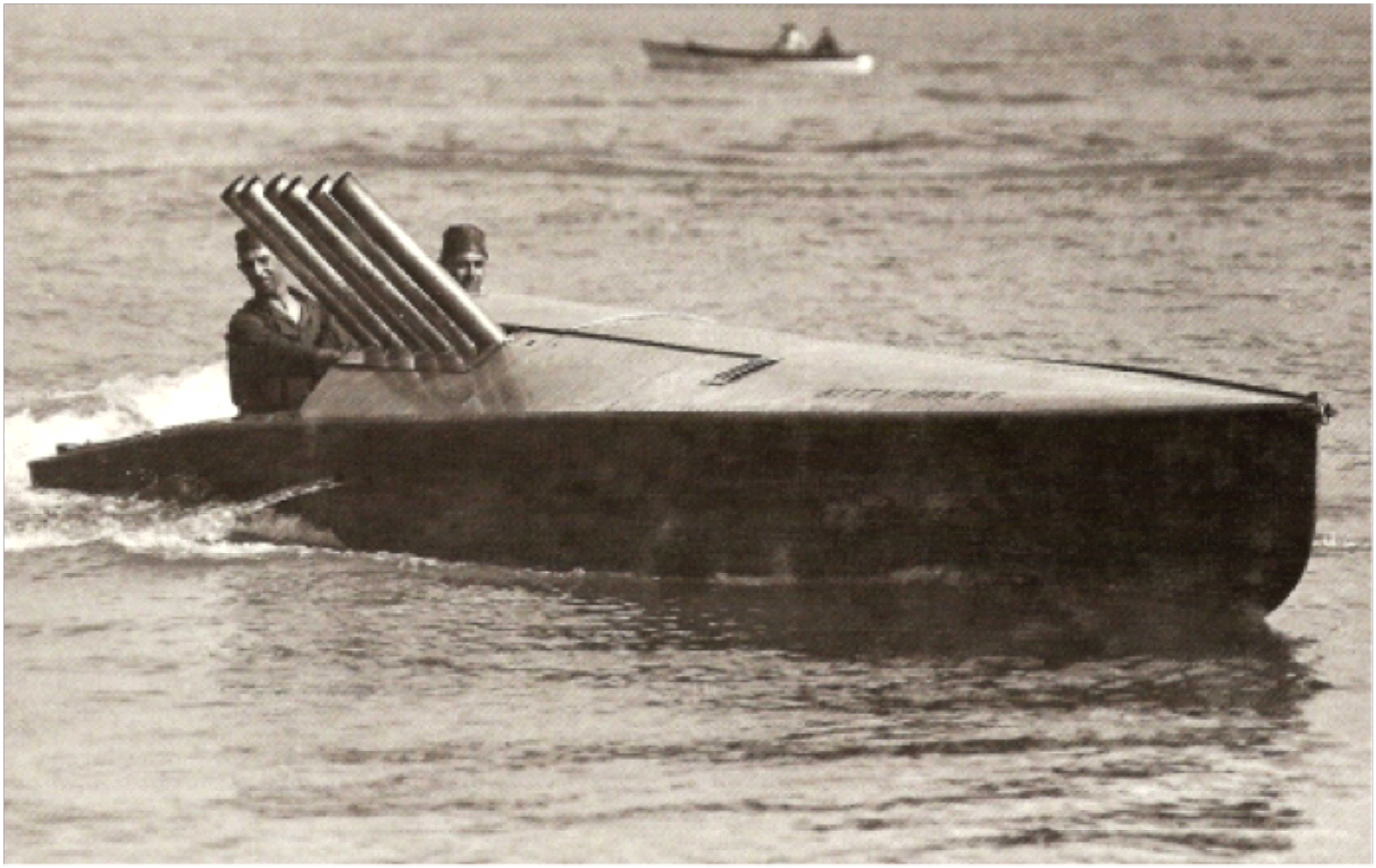
John Hacker's 1911 Kitty Hawk, the fastest boat in the world between 1911 and 1915

In 1911, Hacker designed and installed two floats on the Wright Brothers' biplane so that it could take off and land on water. This was the first use of twin floats on an aircraft.

In the same year he designed Kitty Hawk, the first successful step hydroplane that exceeded the then-unthinkable speed of over 50 mph (80 km/h) and was then the fastest boat in the world. There followed a succession of Kitty Hawks, each building on the success of its predecessor and in the process breaking four sea-speed records.

In 1914, Hacker moved to Detroit and the Hacker Boat Company opened at 323 Crane Avenue. His runabout designs for Gregory's Belle Isle Boat & Engine Company were soon to bring success to the firm. The boats, called Belle Isle Bear Cats, proved popular with prominent owners like J.W. Packard and Henry Ford. The company was thriving and in 1921, Hacker decided it was time to open a satellite facility in Mount Clemens, Michigan. Two years later, he moved the entire boat building operation from Detroit to Mount Clemens.

== Hacker Boat Company flourishes ==
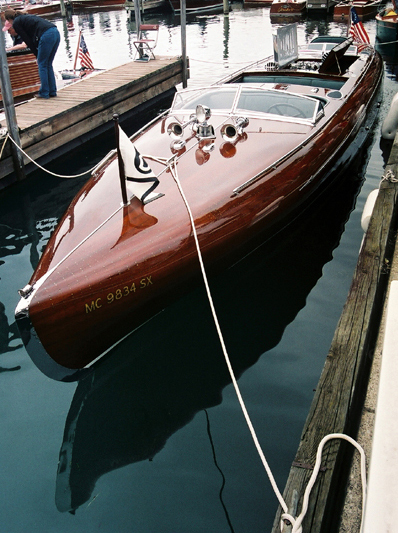
The 1931 Lockpat II, capable of a then-incredible 60 mph

The boat works on the Clinton River in Mount Clemens continued to expand, and by 1928 they provided 35,000 sq ft (3,300 m^{2}) of floor space for the handcrafting of fine mahogany runabouts. That year the "Pageant of Progress" reported that the Hacker Boat Company employed sixty-eight men with demand growing rapidly. Sales for that year were $450,000 (about $5,000,000 2009 USD). Along with a handful of others, such as Gar Woods and Chris-Crafts, Hacker's mahogany runabouts captured the public imagination with their elegant design and breakneck speed and in the process quickly became a must-have play thing for the wealthy.

In 1930 the King of Siam ordered a custom-built 40-foot (12 m) Landau-top runabout powered with an 800 horsepower (600 kW) Packard engine. Only four authorized dealers offered Hacker boats to the public during this period. The company did most of its business through factory direct orders from the customer, and excelled in custom-built craft.

== 1930–1960 ==
The Great Depression had a devastating effect on the pleasure-boat market. In 1935 Hacker took on a business partner, S. Dudley McCready, who quickly assumed day-to-day control of the company. Meanwhile, Hacker focused on designing boats in what was to become his golden period: he was responsible for a remarkable number of racing winners including El Lagarto (which won the Gold Cup in 1933, 1934 and 1935), Scotty, Scotty Too, My Sweetie, Miss Pepsi —all record breakers.

In all, Hacker was responsible for over twenty water speed records, five Gold Cup winners, four President's Race winners and numerous other speed trials and racing victories.

In Mount Clemens, Hacker Boat Company rebounded from the Depression with popular "utility" Hacker-Craft runabouts priced for the ordinary consumer. In 1935, the 17-foot (5.2 m) utility could be purchased for $975 ($13,000 2009 USD).

In 1939 Hacker was commissioned by property tycoon George Whitell to build what was to be one of his masterpieces and is now a national historic treasure, a 55 ft (17 m) commuter called Thunderbird, which was commemorated on a postage stamp in 2007 by the U.S. Postal Service .

In 1952, Hacker Boat was awarded a government contract for the construction of 25 ocean-going picket boats for the U.S. Navy and 112 40-foot-plus (12 m) crash boats, 20 ft (6.1 m) sedan utility boats, and target boats. Hacker's designs included patrol boats, air-sea rescue boats, and cruisers.

== Hacker Boat Company revitalized, 1959-1983 ==
In 1959 William Morgan of Morgan Marine, a boat-builder from Silver Bay, on Lake George, New York, acquired the Hacker-Craft name with the aim of revitalizing the company's historic legacy.

Morgan Marine made significant structural and engineering modifications. The use of new technologies, unavailable to Hacker, allowed for improvements of the boats in a few subtle but important ways. Where Hacker had used 110 hp (82 kW) engines, Morgan Marine was able to power these hulls with 350 hp (260 kW) or 454 hp (339 kW) Crusader engines that could exceed 50 miles per hour. To accommodate these improved engines, Morgan Marine had to make the supports stronger than those used in the original designs. Morgan's biggest accomplishment, however, was improving the handling of the Hacker Crafts. If the old Hackers were run at top speeds, the bow could rise and block the driver's view. By reworking the bottom design, Morgan ensured that the boat would remain more level in the water.

== Modern Classics: 1983 - Present ==
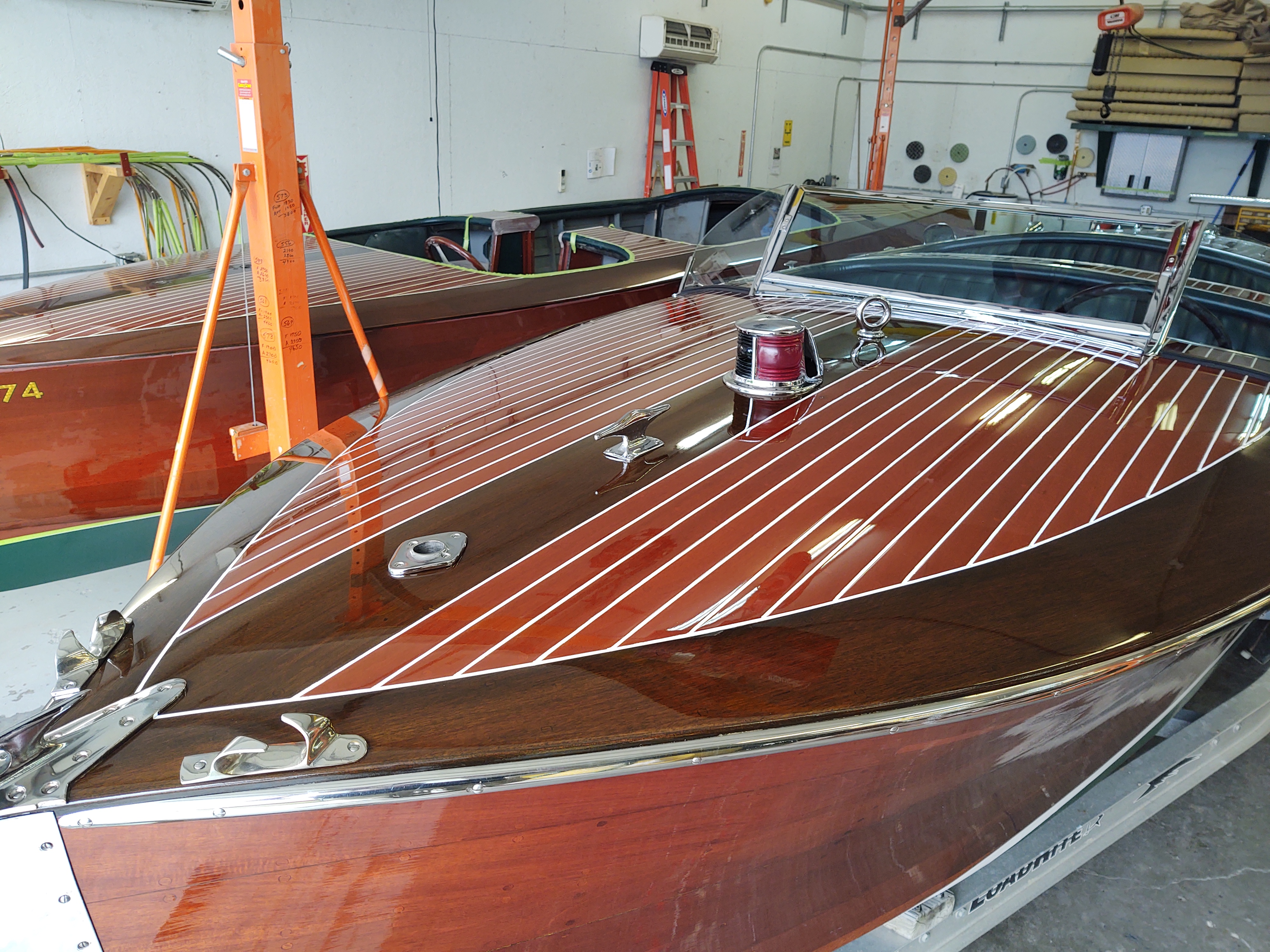
1983 Hacker Craft, hull 7, the first “Modern Classic” 26’ Triple Cockpit Runabout built, shown after full refurb in 2021 (boat name “007”).

In 1983, (the relaunch of the "Modern Classics" and reset of hull numbers starting at 000), significant additional improvements were made to modernize the boats while retaining their classic look. Many of the original jigs had been lost, and, where necessary, they made new sand castings for the hardware. While retaining most of the traditional craftsmanship, Morgan made several significant improvements over the old plans, as concessions to the advancement of technology: dual exhausts, rather than the original single exhaust, for enhanced engine performance; the use of stainless steel fittings and hardware throughout so that pitting was no longer a problem; state-of-the-art epoxy encapsulation and bonding techniques; triple planked bottoms completely encased in epoxy; double planked sides and deck saturated in epoxy; 25% more frames; double the number of floor timbers; up to 18 coats of varnish; the use of renewable-resourced Honduras mahogany; new improved steering for more maneuverability; and laminated windshields with either blue or green tints. The product line consisted of three models: 26 foot Gentleman's Racer; 26 foot and 30 foot triple-cockpit Runabout. Each could be customized to the buyer’s wishes.

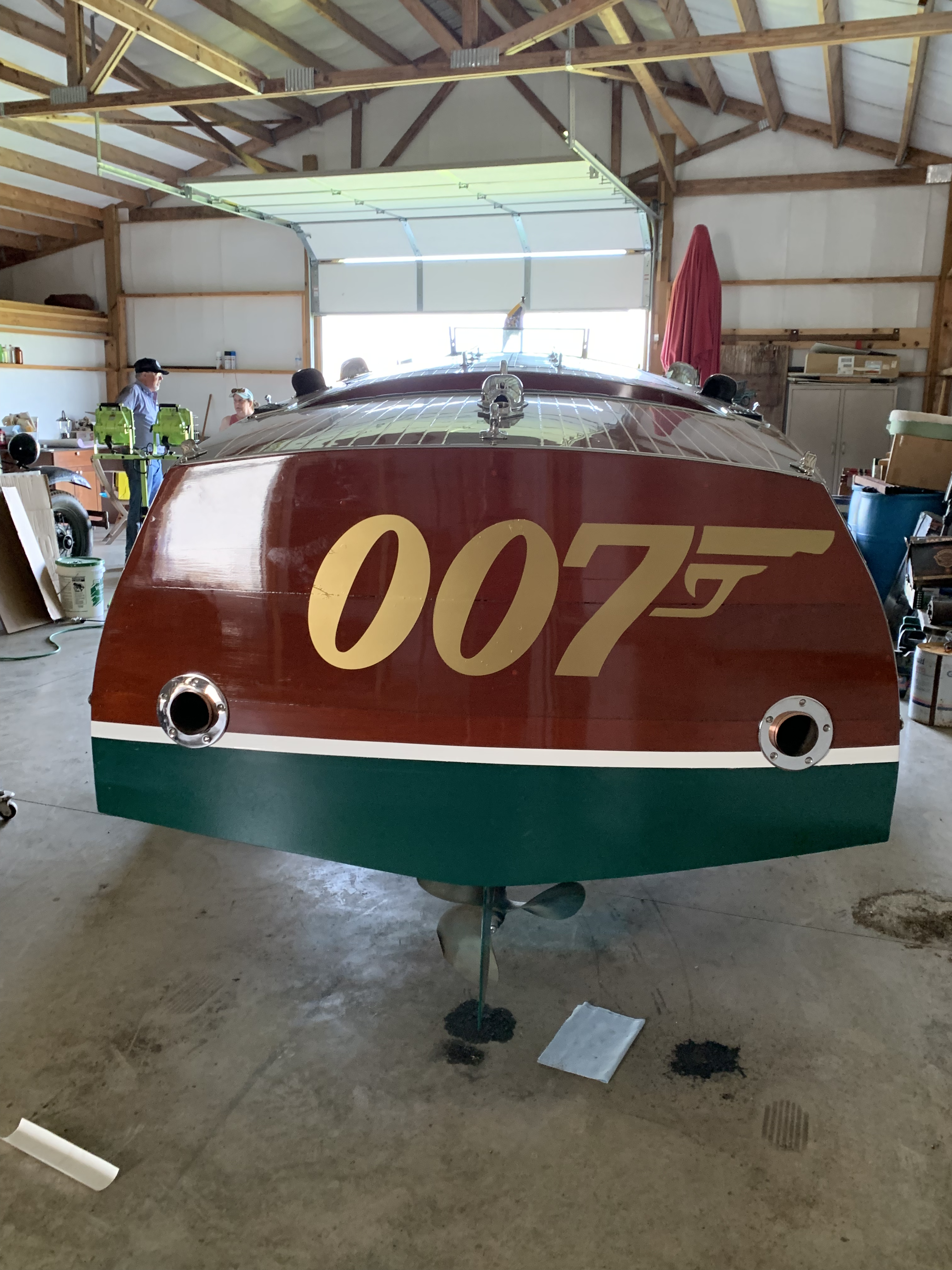
Stern View of First Modern Triple, Hull 7

In 2004 Robert Wagemann bought the company from William Morgan. In 2008 George Badcock's Erin Investments acquired a majority interest in the company from Robert Wagemann. Subsequently, the company opened a 32,000-square-foot production facility in Ticonderoga, moving production there from Silver Bay in order to increase capacity. In 2011 Erin Investments attained complete ownership of the company.

In addition to the new production facility, the company's headquarters campus on Lake George, also the site of a full service marina, was upgraded, with a new showroom capable of displaying four boats. The headquarters offices and all storage and service buildings were repaired/refurbished. The campus was landscaped and parking areas upgraded.

In 2011 Hacker-Craft were seen in TV and catalog shoots for Marks & Spencer (UK), Tommy Hilfiger and Nautica.

In 2011 the custom designed Neiman Marcus Edition Hacker-Craft was selected as a “fantasy gift” in the legendary Neiman Marcus Christmas Book catalog.

In 2012 a partnership with Tommy Bahama resulted in a custom designed model, the Tommy Bahama Edition Hacker-Craft (TBE).

In 2015 the company introduced a limousine yacht tender, and appointed the Sierra Boat Company, on Lake Tahoe, Nevada, and Wawasee Boat Company, of Syracuse, Indiana, as an authorized representative.

In 2017 the company appointed Thailand-based Classic Boats Lifestyle, Ltd. (CBL) as an official stocking dealer.

In 2019, a Hacker Craft boat appeared in a season two episode of Netflix's Ozark.

In 2021 the company appointed Maryland-based Tomes Landing Marina and Wisconsin-based Pandora Boat Company as official stocking dealers.

In 2021 the company relocated its corporate offices, production and restoration operations from Ticonderoga to Queensbury, NY.
