= Riva Aquarama =

Luxury wooden speedboat

The Riva Aquarama is a luxury wooden runabout built by Italian yachtbuilder Riva. Production of it and its derivatives (the Lungo, Super, and Special) ran from 1962 until 1996. The hull was based on the Riva Tritone, an earlier model speedboat by Riva, which in turn was inspired by the American mahogany Chris-Craft runabouts. The boat's speed, beauty, and craftsmanship earned it praise as the Ferrari of the boat world. The company was founded by Pietro Riva in 1842, and run by Carlo Riva through its 1969 sale to the American Whittaker Corporation.

== Description ==
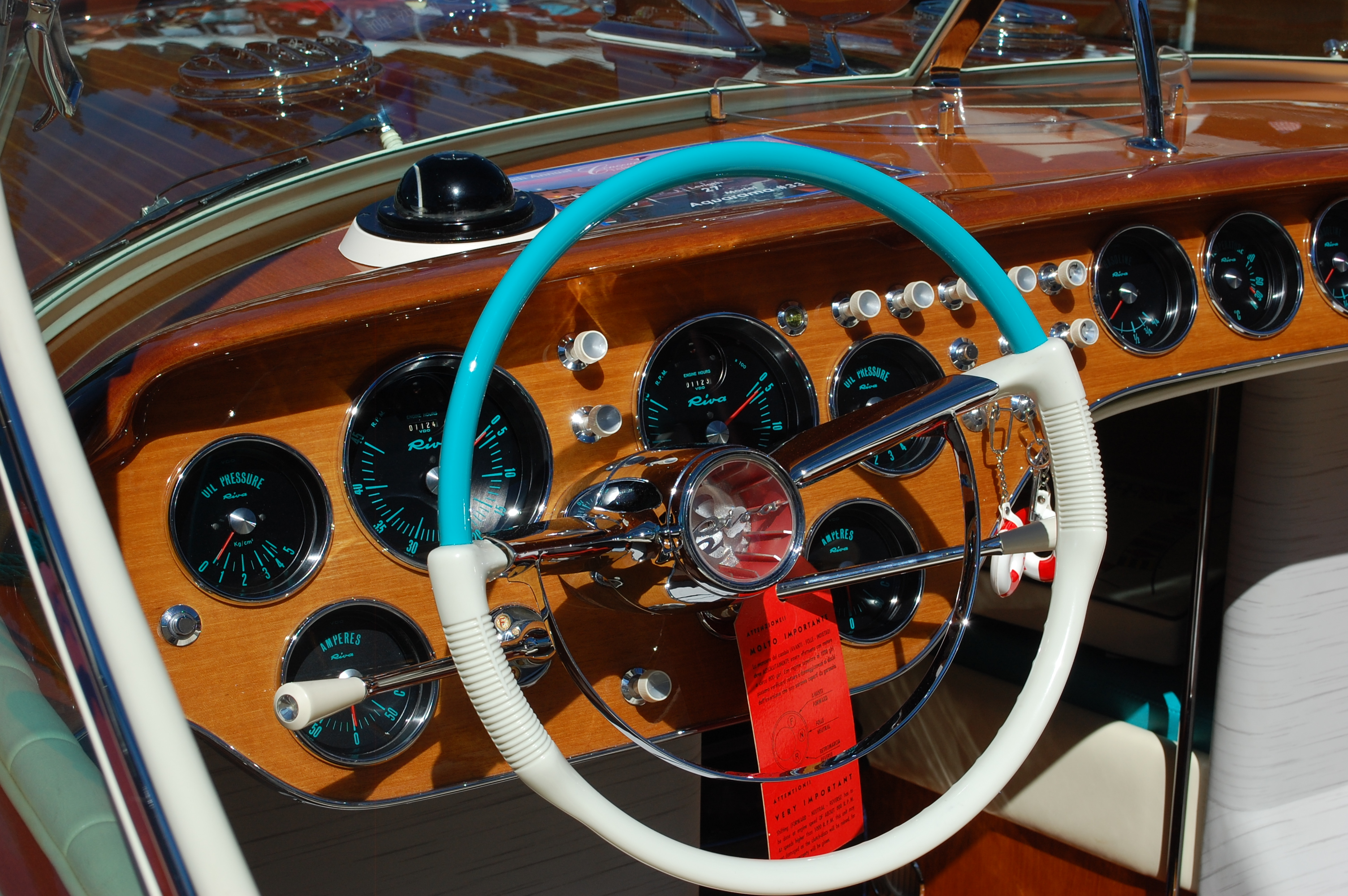
The steering wheel of a Super Aquarama

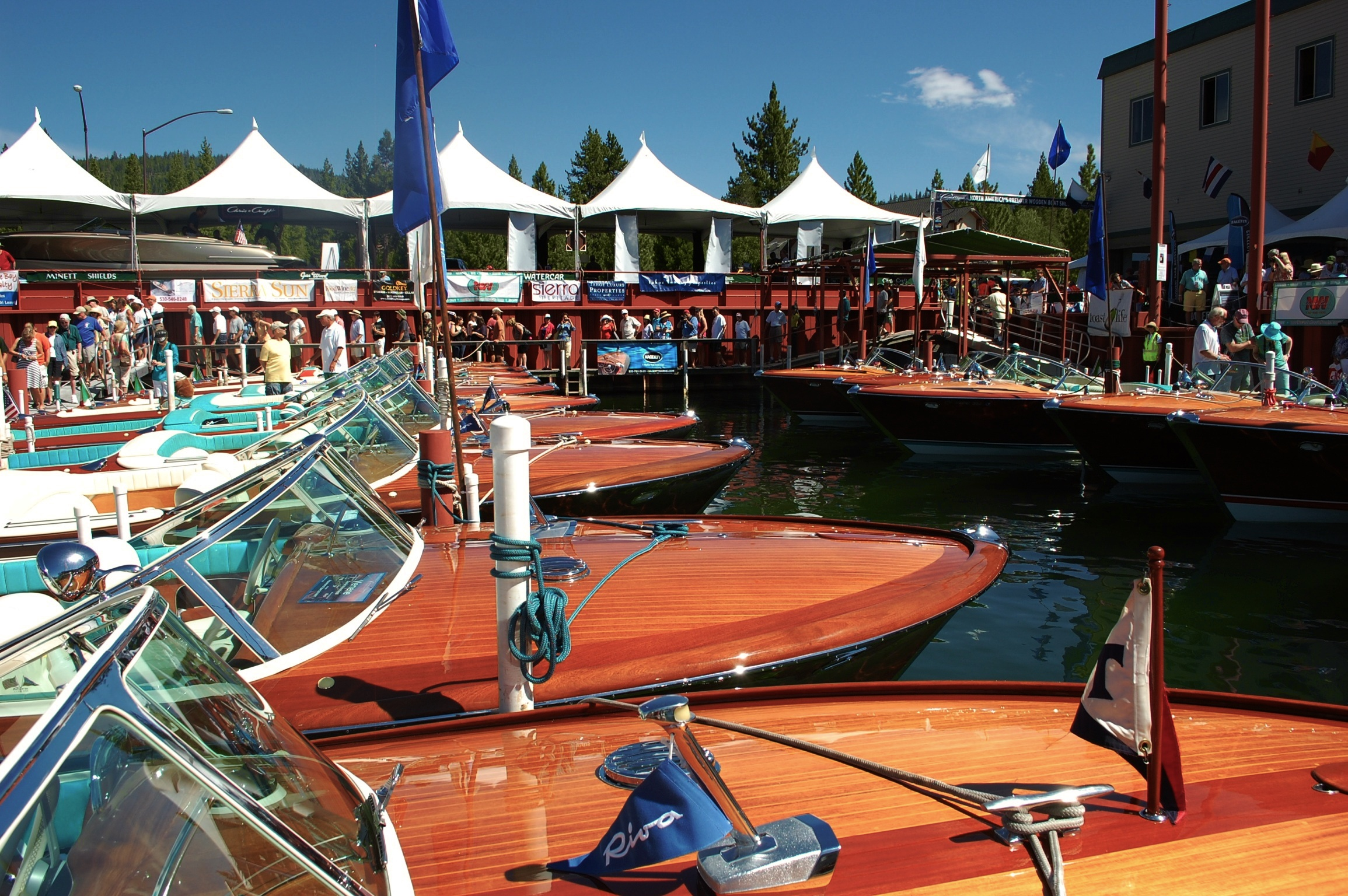
The bows of several Riva Aquaramas and Aristons, an Aquarama in center

The most famous of Carlo Riva's designs, the Aquarama has gained over the decades a legendary nautical reputation. Its evocative name, derived in part from the widescreen Cinerama movie format popular in the early 1960s, echoed in its sweeping wrap-around windshield, conjures images from another time.

The Riva Aquarama's 8.02 - 8.78 metre hull was sheathed in mahogany and varnished to accentuate the beauty of its natural wood grain. All versions were twin engined, with top speeds of 45/50 knots depending on engine choice. Power varied from 185 hp to 400 hp per engine, delivered by Riva 'tuned' Cadillac and Chrysler models, among others. On top of the engine compartment was a cushioned sundeck. The boats also carried a convertible roof which retracted behind the rear seat and cockpit. A swim ladder was often mounted in the stern.

== Model variants: 1960s and 1970s ==
- Aquarama (1962–1972) Total built 281
- Aquarama Lungo (1972) Total built 7
- Super Aquarama (1963–1971) Total built 203
- Aquarama Special (1972–1996) Total built 277
- Riva Lamborghini (1968) - one-off, powered by two Lamborghini V12 engines

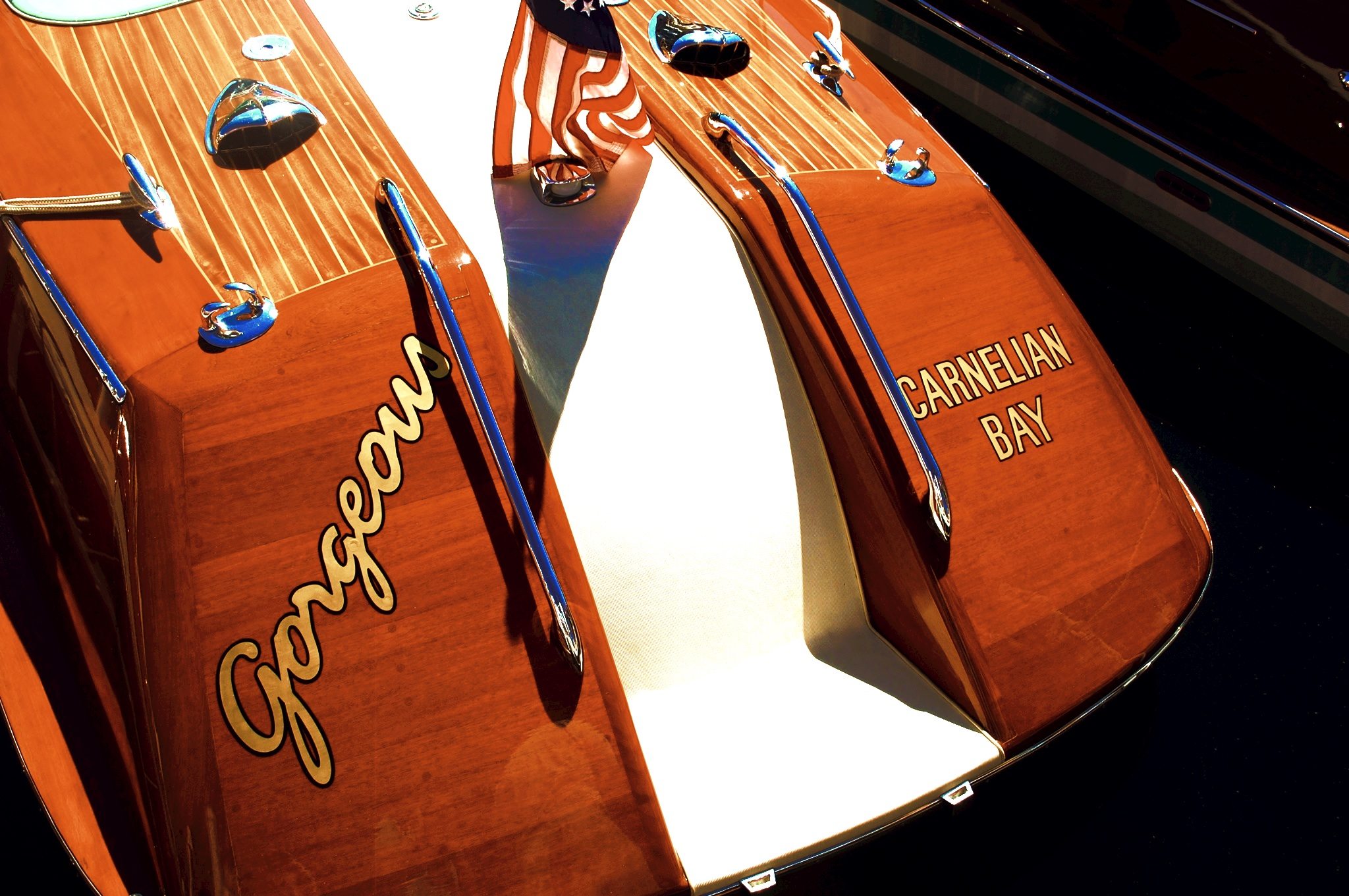
The stern of a 1979 Aquarama Special, with swim step for easy access

The Aquarama is a direct descendant of the Tritone, upon whose hull it was based. First built in 1962, it incorporated the open sunbathing area of the Tritone Aperto together with new features, including separate front seats and a central non-slip gangway which allowed easier water access at the stern.

== Legacy ==
Jeremy Clarkson looked at the history of the Aquarama in his TV programme Jeremy Clarkson's Extreme Machines, and later mentioned it in his book I Know You Got Soul. The boat also featured in the Top Gear 2013 DVD special The Perfect Road Trip in which presenter Jeremy Clarkson, whilst piloting the boat in Venice, described it as "the most beautiful thing ever made". The actress Charlize Theron piloted an Aquarama Super in 1993 in a spot for Martini & Rossi. Another Special piloted by Xenia Onatopp appears in the movie GoldenEye, and a Special is piloted by Vincent Cassel in the movie Ocean's Twelve. In 2011 the actor Jude Law piloted an Aquarama Special for the Dior 2011 campaign.

== Monte Carlo Offshorer ==
Carlo Riva sold the shipyard to the American firm Whittaker, having produced more than 4,000 watercraft over the years. He appointed his brother-in-law Gino Gervasoni as CEO in 1971. The Riva family's history with the company ended in 1989 when Gervasoni left the business.

After selling the Riva yard, Carlo Riva took part in the creation of the "Monte Carlo Offshorer" brand. In the 1970s, American raceboat designer Bob Hobbs, an advocate of stepped bottoms for offshore boats, and engine expert Cal Connell designed a three-plane, two-step boat hull to show Riva. The function of the steps was to lower the speed at which the boat begins to plane, increasing its speed and efficiency. The cold-molded wooden prototype was built by a small boatyard in Miami, but it had serious problems with stability. After being shipped to Monaco, Riva modified the hull to improve its handling and then put the new model into production as the first stepped-hull speedboat series.

The goal was to develop runabouts with the same strengths as the Super Aquarama in build quality, power and livability on board while handling better at sea.

== Riva Aquariva ==
Aquariva continues the Aquarama heritage into the 2000s.
