= Walkaround (boat) =

A Walkaround boat is a cross between a center console and a cuddy boat or express. Like a center console, it is mostly used for fishing and has a full length primary deck or cockpit but also a small cabin (cuddy) for berths and a head in the center in front of the console.

Most walkarounds are production craft, which have steps leading to the bow with a low gunnel giving more interior room. Custom & Semi-custom walkarounds are more fishing oriented and have full gunnel depth all round without stairs.

Most production walkarounds boats are outboard powered, while the majority of custom and semi-custom are powered by inboard diesel engines.
