= Banana boat (boat) =

Inflatable recreational boat

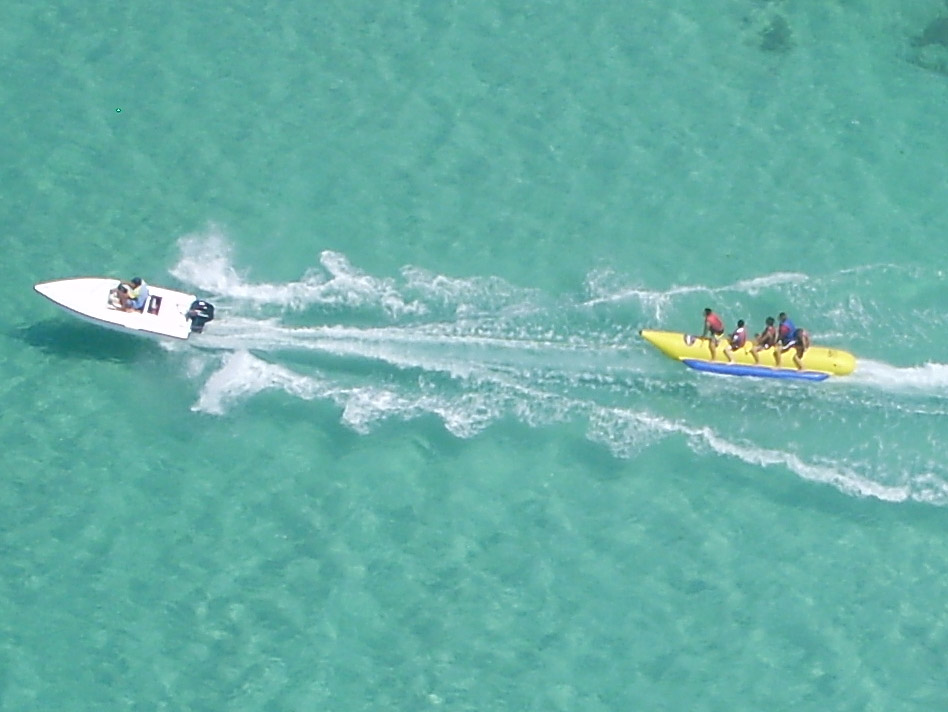
Banana boat, Varadero, Cuba

A banana boat (or water sled), is an unpowered, inflatable recreational boat meant to be towed. Different models usually accommodate three to ten riders sitting on a larger, main tube and resting their feet on two laterally flanking tubes which stabilize the boat. The main tube is often yellow, resembling a banana. Some models have two main tubes.

== See also ==
- List of boat types
