= Motorboat =

Boat which is powered by an engine

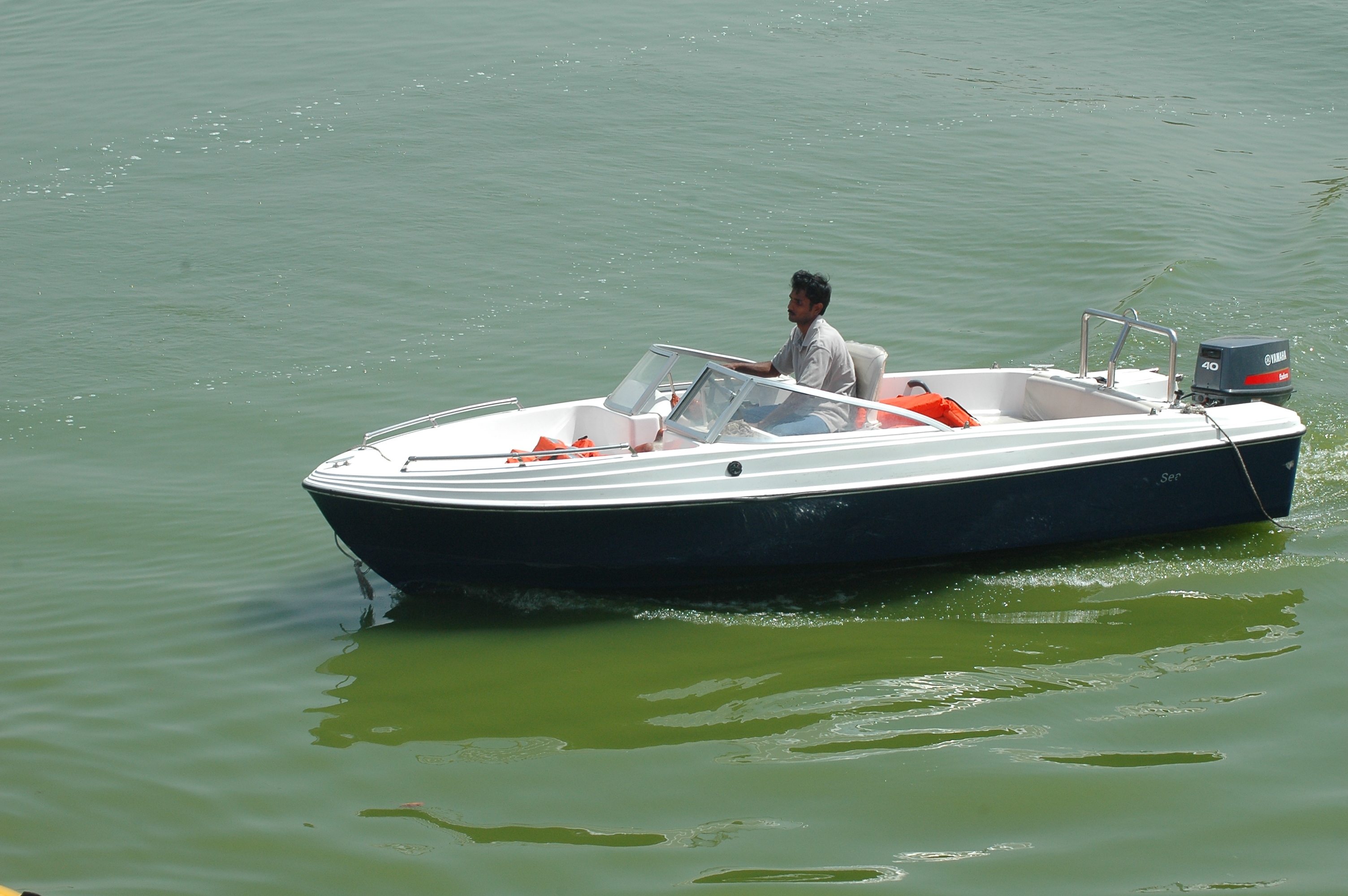
A motorboat with an outboard motor

A motorboat or powerboat is a boat whose propulsion is exclusively provided by a motor, not by wind power (e.g. sail or power kite) or human power. A motorboat capable of cruising at a much faster speed is also called a speedboat.

Some larger motorboats (such as motor yachts) are fitted with inboard motors, while most other motorboats have one or more outboard motors installed at the stern. Most boat motors are internal combustion engine driving a single propeller, with the gearbox, drivetrain and sometimes also the rudder and even the steering handle (i.e. "tie bar") all assembled into one portable unit, although in recent times there are also some that use electric motors (i.e. electric boats). An inboard-outboard contains a hybrid of an inboard and an outboard, where the internal combustion engine is installed inside the boat, and the gearbox and propeller are outside. There are also motorboats utilizing a pump-jet propulsion instead of propellers, although those are rare.

There are two configurations of an inboard, V-drive and direct drive. A direct drive has the powerplant mounted near the middle of the boat with the propeller shaft straight out the back, where a V-drive has the powerplant mounted in the back of the boat facing backwards having the shaft go towards the front of the boat then making a V towards the rear.

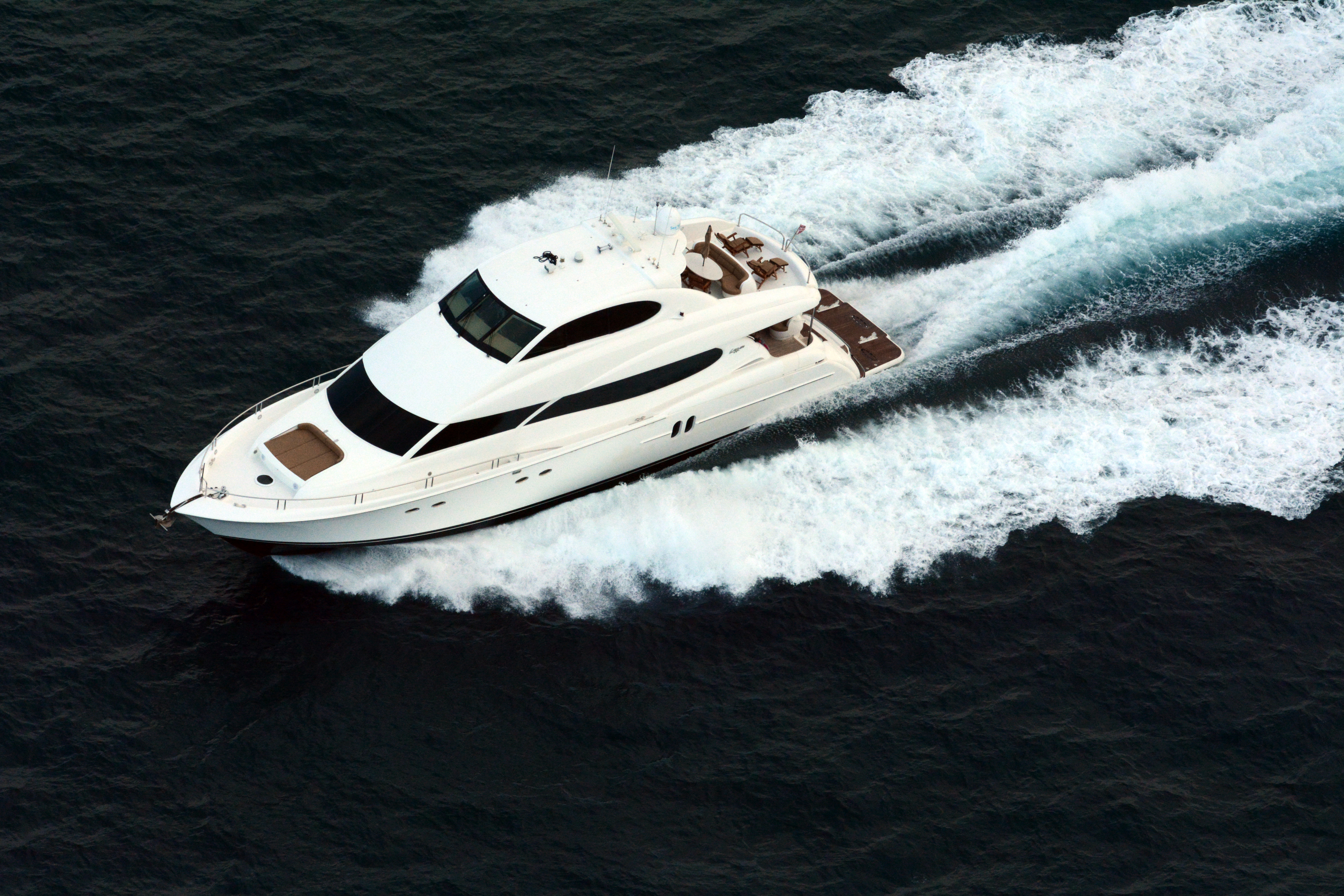
Lazzara 80 Sky Lounge enclosed bridge

== Overview ==
A motorboat is a small craft with one or more engines for propulsion. Motorboats are commonly used for work, recreation, sport, or racing.

Boat engines vary in shape, size, and type. These include inboard, outboard (integrating, the engine, gearbox, and propeller in one portable unit mounted in the rear), and inboard-outboard (or “sterndrive”, which mounts the engine inboard and the rest outboard).

Fuel types include gasoline, diesel, gas turbine, rotary combustion or steam.

High performance speedboats can reach speeds of over 50 knots. Their high speed and performance can be attributed to their hull technology and engine. With a more powerful and heavier engine, an appropriate hull shape is needed. High performance boats include yachts, HSIC (high speed interceptor craft) and racing powerboats.

A V-type hull helps a boat cut through the water. A deep V-hull helps keep the boat's bow down at low speeds, improving visibility. V-hulls also improve a boat's speed and maneuvering capabilities. They stabilize a boat in rough conditions.

== History ==
=== Invention ===
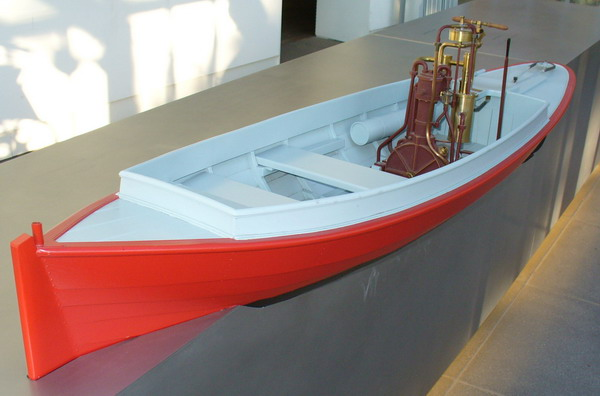
Model of the first motor boat constructed by Gottlieb Daimler and Wilhelm Maybach in 1886

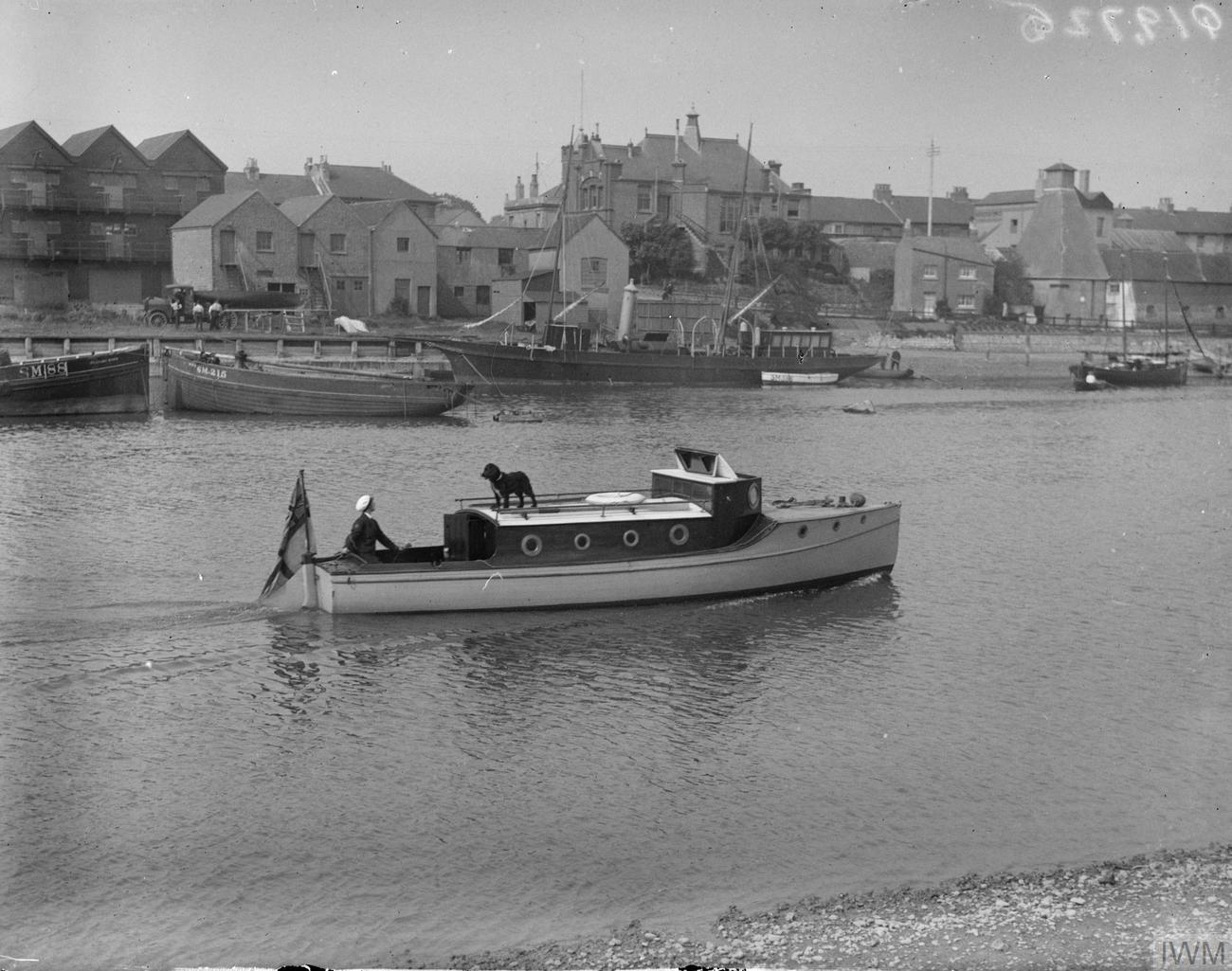
A motorboat on patrol in Southwick, West Sussex during World War I

Although the screw propeller had been added to an engine (steam engine) as early as the 18th century in Birmingham, England, by James Watt, boats powered by a petrol engine only came about in the later part of the 19th century with the invention of the internal combustion engine.

The earliest boat to be powered by a petrol engine was tested on the Neckar River by Gottlieb Daimler and Wilhelm Maybach in 1886, when they tested their new "longcase clock" engine. It had been constructed in the former greenhouse (converted into a workshop) in Daimler's back yard. The first public display took place on the Waldsee in Cannstatt, today a suburb of Stuttgart, at the end of that year. The engine of this boat had a single cylinder of 1 horse power. Daimler's second launch in 1887 had a second cylinder positioned at an angle of 15 degrees to the first one, and was known as the "V-type".

The first successful motor boat was designed by the Priestman Brothers in Hull, England, under the direction of William Dent Priestman. The company began trials of their first motorboat in 1888. The engine was powered with kerosene and used an innovative high-tension (high voltage) ignition system. The company was the first to begin large scale production of the motor boat, and by 1890, Priestman's boats were successfully being used for towing goods along canals.

Another early pioneer was Mr. J. D. Roots, who in 1891 fitted a launch with an internal combustion engine and operated a ferry service between Richmond and Wandsworth along the River Thames during the seasons of 1891 and 1892.

The eminent inventor Frederick William Lanchester recognized the potential of the motorboat and over the following 15 years, in collaboration with his brother George, perfected the modern motorboat, or powerboat. Working in the garden of their home in Olton, Warwickshire, they designed and built a river flat-bottomed launch with an advanced high-revving engine that drove via a stern paddle wheel in 1893. In 1897, he produced a second engine similar in design to his previous one but running on benzene at 800 r.p.m. The engine drove a reversible propeller. An important part of his new engine was the revolutionary carburettor, for mixing the fuel and air correctly. His invention was known as a "wick carburetor", because fuel was drawn into a series of wicks, from where it was vaporized. He patented this invention in 1905.

The Daimler Company began production of motor boats in 1897 from its manufacturing base in Coventry. The engines had two cylinders and the explosive charge of petroleum and air was ignited by compression into a heated platinum tube. The engine gave about six horse-power. The petrol was fed by air pressure to a large surface carburettor and also an auxiliary tank which supplied the burners for heating the ignition tubes. Reversal of the propeller was effected by means of two bevel friction wheels which engaged with two larger bevel friction wheels, the intermediate shaft being temporarily disconnected for this purpose. It was not until 1901 that a safer apparatus for igniting the fuel with an electric spark was used in motor boats.

=== Expansion ===
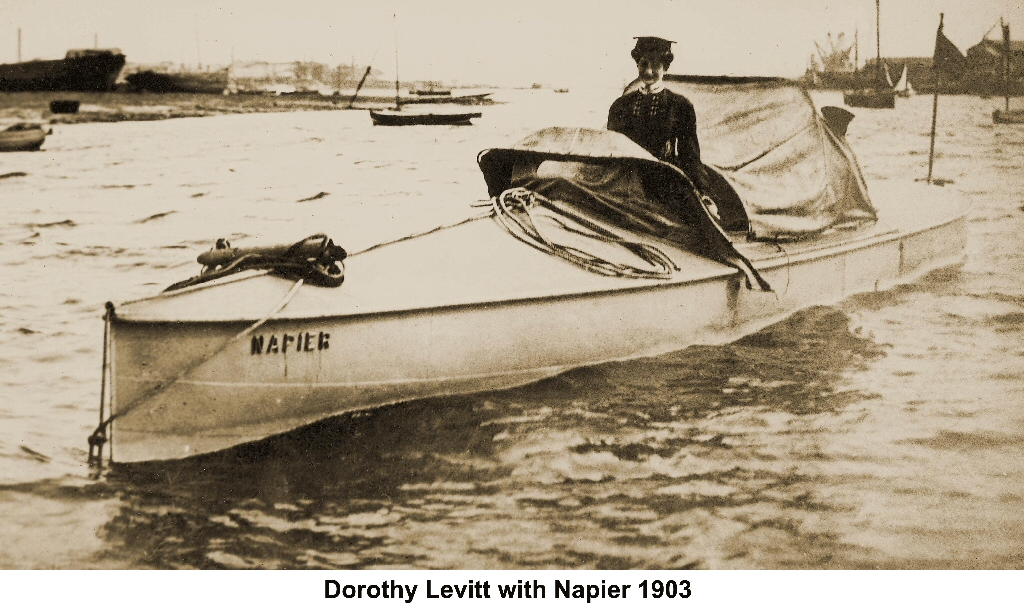
Dorothy Levitt won the first Harmsworth Cup, driving the Napier motor yacht in 1903.

Interest in fast motorboats grew rapidly in the early years of the 20th century. The Marine Motor Association was formed in 1903 as an offshoot of the Royal Automobile Club. Motor Boat & Yachting was the first magazine to address technical developments in the field and was brought out by Temple Press, London from 1904. Large manufacturing companies, including Napier & Son and Thornycroft began producing motorboats.

=== Early racing ===
The first motorboating competition was established by Alfred Charles William Harmsworth in 1903. The Harmsworth Cup was envisioned as a contest between nations, rather than between boats or individuals. The boats were originally to be designed and built entirely by residents of the country represented, using materials and units built wholly within that country.

The first competition, held in July 1903, at Cork Harbour in Ireland, and officiated by the Automobile Club of Great Britain and Ireland and the Royal Victoria Yacht Club, was a very primitive affair, with many boats failing even to start. The competition was won by Dorothy Levitt in a Napier launch designed to the specifications of Selwyn Edge. This motorboat was the first proper motorboat designed for high speed. She set the world's first water speed record when she achieved 19.3 mph (31.1 km/h) in a 40-foot (12 m) steel-hulled, 75-horsepower Napier speedboat fitted with a three-blade propeller. As both the owner and entrant of the boat, "S. F. Edge" was engraved on the trophy as the winner.

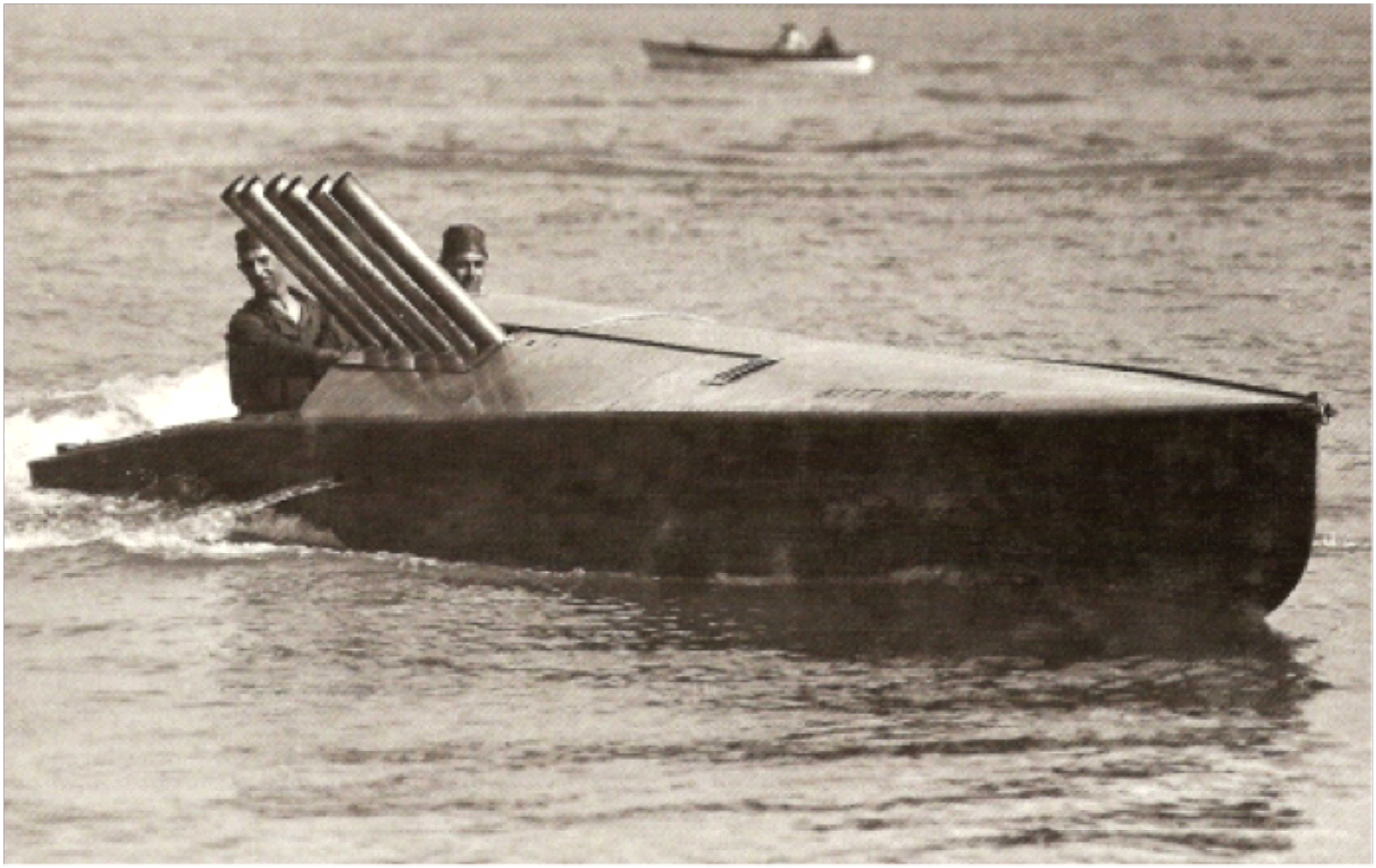
John Hacker's 1911 Kitty Hawk was the fastest boat in the world between 1911 and 1915.

An article in the Cork Constitution on 13 July reported "A large number of spectators viewed the first mile from the promenade of the Yacht Club, and at Cork several thousand people collected at both sides of the river to see the finishes." Levitt was then commanded to the Royal yacht of King Edward VII where he congratulated her on her pluck and skill, and they discussed the performance of the motorboat and its potential for British government despatch work.

France won the race in 1904, and the boat Napier II set a new world water speed record for a mile at almost 30 knots (56 km/h), winning the race in 1905.

The acknowledged genius of motor boat design in America was the naval architect John L. Hacker. His pioneering work, including the invention of the V-hull and the use of dedicated petrol engines revolutionized boat design from as early as 1908, when he founded the Hacker Boat Co. In 1911, Hacker designed the Kitty Hawk, the first successful step hydroplane which exceeded the then-unthinkable speed of 50 mph (80 km/h) and was at that time the fastest boat in the world. The Harmsworth Cup was first won by Americans in 1907. The US and England traded it back and forth until 1920. From 1920 to 1933, Americans had an unbroken winning streak. Gar Wood won this race eight times as a driver and nine times as an owner between 1920 and 1933.

== Hull type ==
From a design point of view, a boat’s hull type reflects its use and the waters where it will be used. These include displacement hulls, vee-bottom hulls, modified vee-bottom hulls, deep-vee hulls and trim tabs for vee-bottom hulls. The three main hull materials are wood, reinforced fiberglass and metal. Wood hulls may be made of planks or plywood. Fiberglass hulls are reinforced with balsa wood. Metal hulls are either aluminum or steel. Some gross configurations of motorboats include skiff, day cruiser, bow rider, pilothouse and cabin cruiser. These vary by such considerations as size, whether they have a deck, cabin, head, is sail, helm position, and additional seating.

== Gallery ==
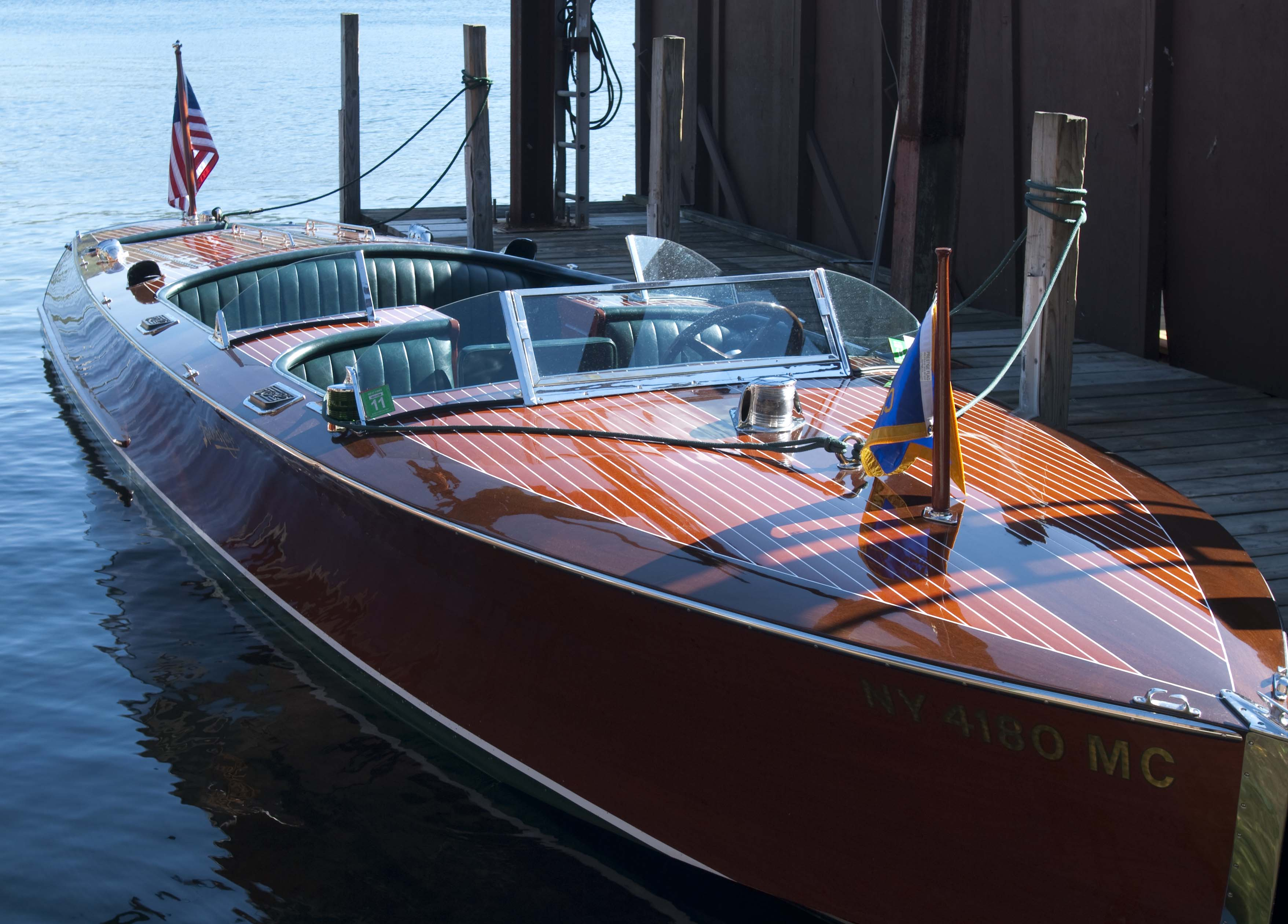
A 2010 Hacker-Craft triple cockpit runabout

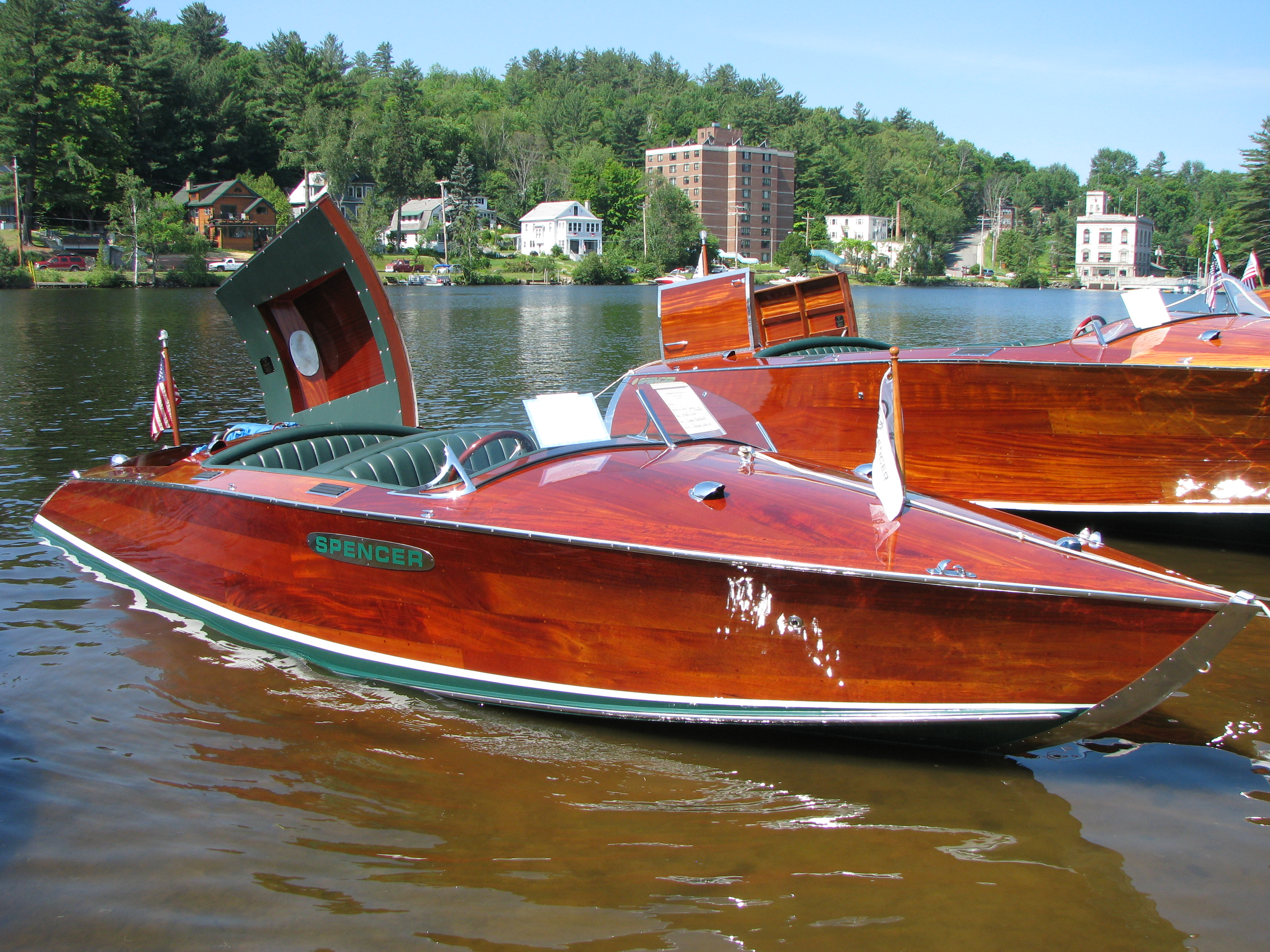
2004, 22 ft Spencer runabout

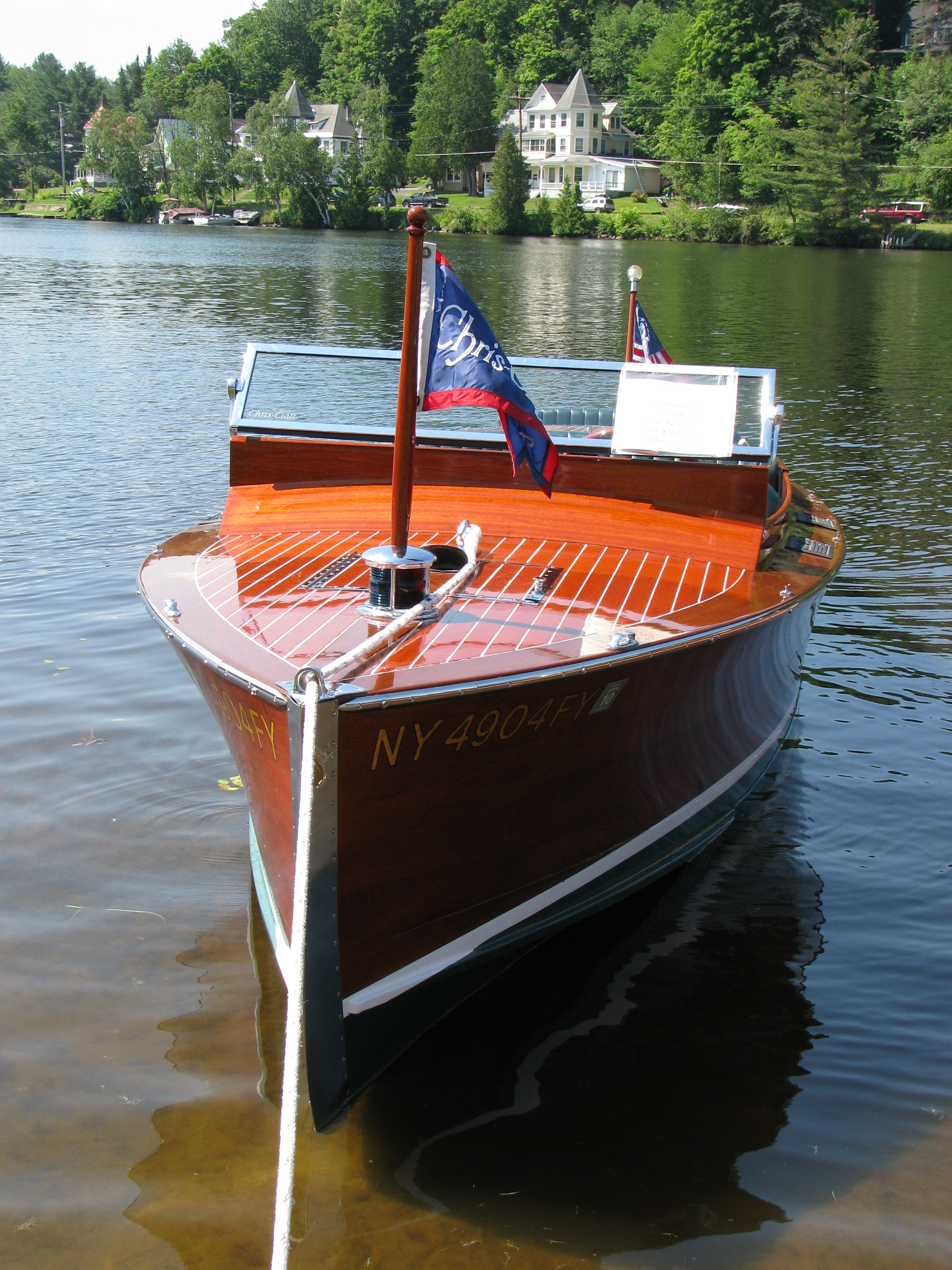
1928 Chris Craft Cadet

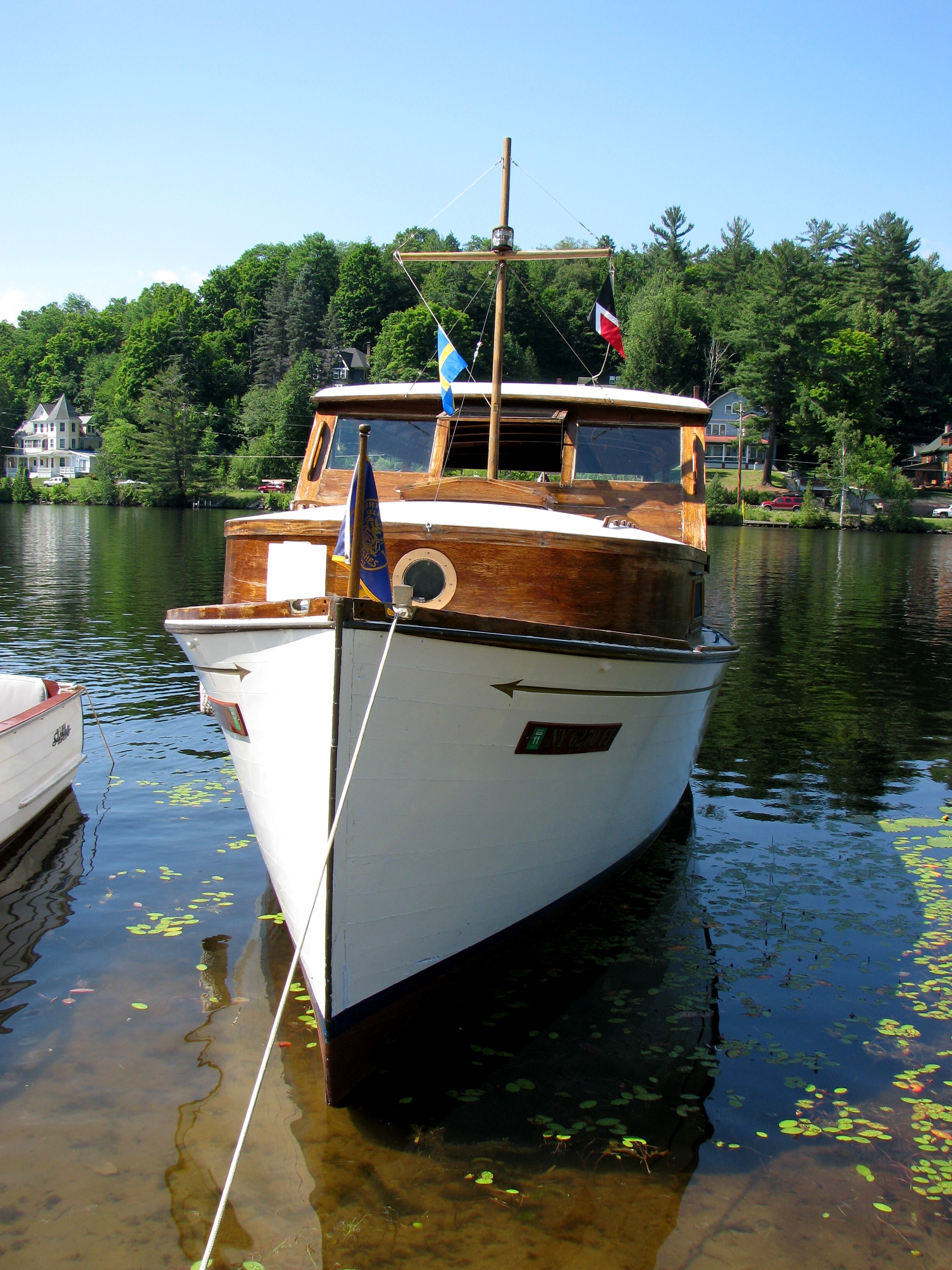
1929 Richardson Croisette, 29 foot, Chrysler Ace engine

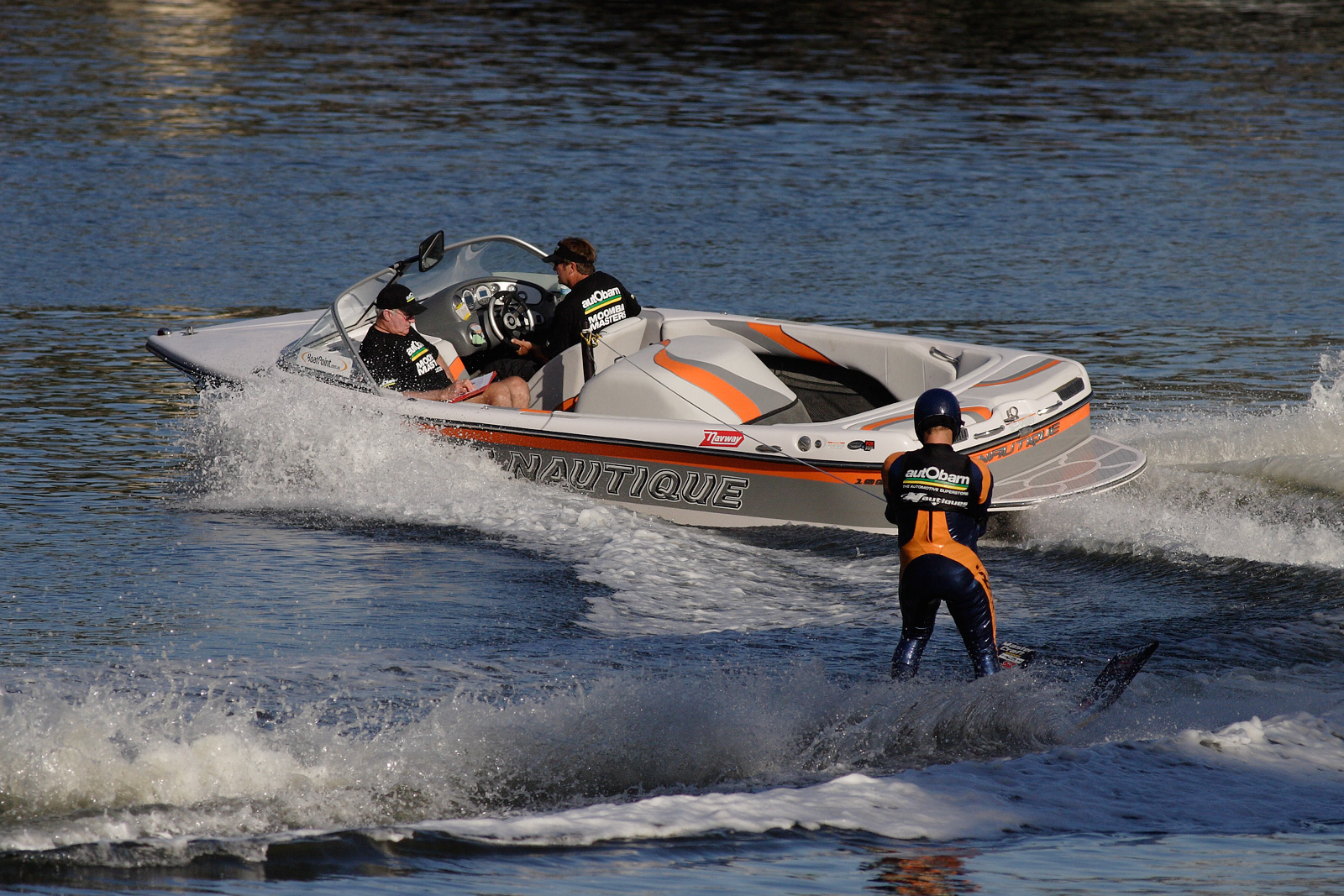
A motorboat pulling a waterskier

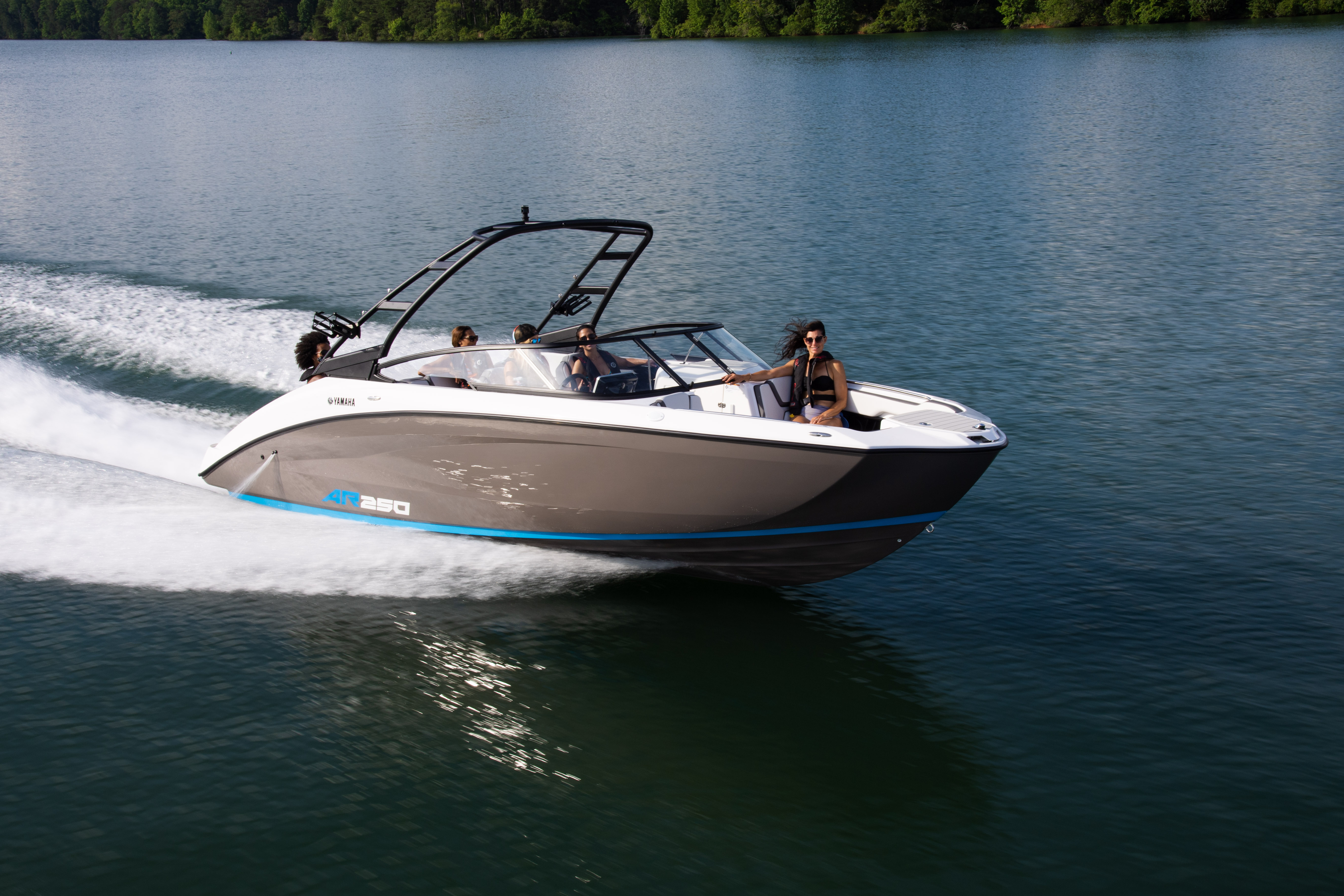
2021 Yamaha FRP motorboat

== See also ==
- Electric boat
- Go-fast boat
- Launch (boat)
- Motorboat racing
- Motor launch
- Motorsailer
- Sterndrive
- Circle of death (boating)
