= List of yacht support vessels by length =

Yacht support vessels are an increasingly popular way of extending the yachting experience. They can be used as a floating helipad, tender garage or accommodation for crew and specialist staff.

== Table ==
Rank	Year	Length overall in meters	Name	Shipyard	Photo	Mothership	Notes	Reference
1	2016	164	Fulk Al Salamah	Mariotti Yachts		Al Said		
2	1987	136.33	Al Dhaferah	Bremer Vulkan		Al Said		
3	2002	133	M2	Severnav Shipyard		A+	Acquired in 2016. Refit 2016 - 2018 Singapore.	
4	1973	79	Dubai Shadow	Mitsubishi Heavy Industries Ltd.		Dubai		
5	1975	77.34	Khozam	Schichau Unterwesser AG			Sister ship of the converted superyachts Arctic P & Sea Ranger	
6	2023	75	Abeona	Damen Group		Koru		
7	2018	73.60	Sherpa	Feadship		Hampshire II		
8	2017	72	Game Changer	Damen Group			Second 69m Sea Axe Fast Yacht Support Vessel. During a refit in 2020 Game Changer was lengthened with 2.85 meters.	
9	2018	71.50	Umm Alhoul	Damen Group			Originally planned for 2016. Built as part of the Nakilat Damen group.	
10	2018	71.50	Daloob	Damen Group			Originally planned for 2017. Built as part of the Nakilat Damen group.	
11	2016	69	Intrepid	Damen Group		Infinity	First 69m Sea Axe Fast Yacht Support Vessel.	
12	2021	68.2	Wayfinder	Astilleros Armon			Shadow Cat	
13	1980	67.28	Explorer	Candies Shipbuilders (Formerly Houma)				
14	2012	67.15	Garcon	Damen Group		Ace	First 67m Sea Axe Fast Yacht Support Vessel.	
15	2014	67.15	Dapple	Damen Group		Flying Fox	Second 67m Sea Axe Fast Yacht Support Vessel.	
16	1982	67.06	Global	Bender Shipbuilding & Repair Co.				
17	1994	66.75	Golden Shadow	Campbell Shipyard		Golden Odyssey	Part of the Golden fleet of Khalid bin Sultan.	
18	2018	66.2	Hodor	Astilleros Armon		Lonian	Shadow Cat	
19	1978	63.40	Suri	Halter Marine				
20	2016	60	Sputnik	Boustead Naval Shipyard		Queen K	Sputnik was built as an offshore supply vessel. She was then converted at Fincantieri Yachts.	
21	1978	58	Afthonia V	Scheepswerf De Waal				
22	2019	57	B3	Damen Group		Erica	Seventh YS 5009.	
23	1980	56.62	Al Shoua	Rockport Yacht & Supply Co		Constellation	Built as the offshore service vessel Interceptor. Converted to superyacht support vessel in 2008	
24	1973	56.40	Quattroelle Shadow	Mitsubishi Heavy Industries Ltd.		Quattroelle		
25	2020	55.50	Gene Chaser	Damen Group		Gene Machine	Eighth YS 5009. Originally named Blue Ocean, later sold and renamed Gene Chaser.	
26	2021	55.50	Better Space	Damen Group		Better Place	Ninth YS 5009. Originally named Time Off, later sold and renamed Better Space.	
27	2016	55.30	Axis	Damen Group		Gigi	Fourth YS 5009. Originally named Fast & Furious, later sold and renamed Axis.	
28	2017	55.30	Shadow	Damen Group		Spectre	Fifth YS 5009. Originally named New Frontiers, later sold and renamed Shadow.	
29	2018	55.30	Power Play	Damen Group		Mogambo	Sixth YS 5009.	
30	2010	54	Umbra	Damen Group		Alucia		
31	2012	53.25	Ad-Vantage	Damen Group		Vantage	Ad-Vantage started out as a firefighting and fast crew support vessel servicing offshore platforms.	
32	2009	51.30	Pursuit	Damen Group			First purpose built Sea Axe Fast Yacht Support vessel.	
33	2010	51.25	Transit	Damen Group				
34	1976	50.20	Perfect Life	Rockport Yacht & Supply Co.				
35	1981	49.70	Mystrere Shadow	Candies Shipbuilders (Formerly Houma)		Istranka		
36	2006	48.77	Etoile de la Mer	Breaux's Bay Craft				
37	1978	48.76	Pacific Provider	Blount Marine				
38	2017	46	Charley	Echo Yachts		White Rabbit		
39	2019	45.60	Pink Shadow	Damen Group		Pink Gin VI	First YS 4508. Originally launched as Joy Rider.	
40	2010	43.59	Solution	Westport Yachts				
41	2006	42.18	Bystander	JFA Yachts		Velsheda	Named after the original America's Cup support tender.	
42	1930	37.19	Atlantide	Philip & Sons		Hanuman	After being launched in 1930, she also was the tender for another J-class yacht, Shamrock V.	
43	2021	36	Phantom Phi	Alia Yachts		PHI		
44	2012	35.82	Ghost	Damen Group				
45	1967	35.69	Lujah 2704	Scheepswerf De Industrie			Originally built in 1967 and last refitted in 2016.	
46	2001	33.50	Al-Noores	Damen Group				
47	1996	28.66	Viking Legacy	Damen Group				
48	2018	27.30	Playa	Lynx Yachts			First YXT 24.	
49	2020	27.30	Roe Shadow	Lynx Yachts		Roe	Second YXT 24.	
50	2016	25	Al Makher	Abeking & Rasmussen				
51	2001	24	U Boat Navigator	Rena Umut Kocali				
52	2014	23.98	YXT One	Lynx Yachts				
53	2016	21.45	YXT 20	Lynx Yachts				

== Under construction ==
Year	Length overall in meters	Name	Shipyard	Reference
2019	62	Project YSV62	RMK Marine	
2022	75	Project YS 7512	Damen	
TBA	54	Hull H179/20	Grandweld Shipyards	

== See also ==
- List of motor yachts by length
- List of yachts built by Amels BV
- Luxury yacht
