= Yacht support vessel =

Type of specialized ship

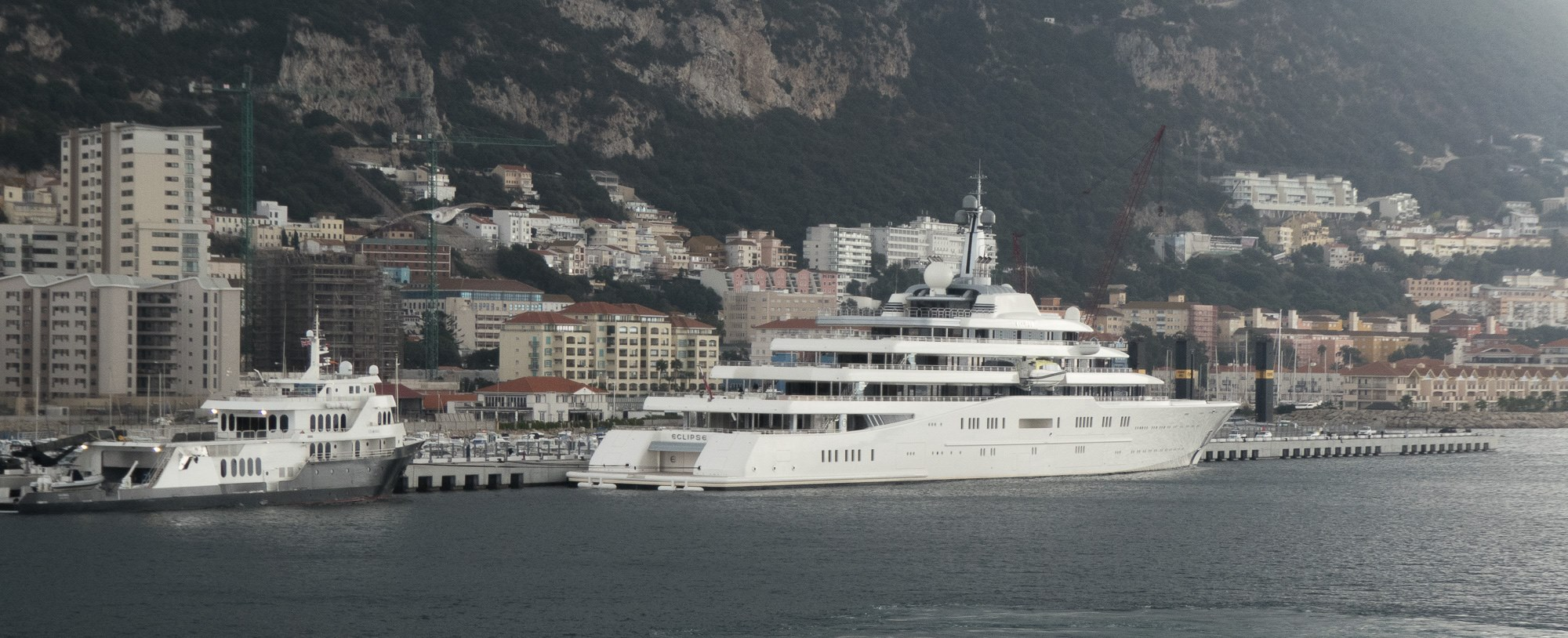
Superyacht, Eclipse, with a support vessel

Yacht support vessels, also known as a shadow yacht or shadow vessel, are specialized ships which provide support and auxiliary functions for large sailing and motor yachts.

== Design features ==
In general yacht support vessel are outfitted to support a specific megayacht mothership with their own features tailored to complement or match those of the main vessel. Support yachts are normally intended to carry the "toys" of the super rich, whether they be a rigid inflatable boat, a fishing boat, luxury yacht tender, jet-ski or submersible.

A helipad is a common feature, especially when supporting sailing yachts which do not have their own landing pad.

Some yacht support vessels are designed to support their owner's scientific research.

== Market ==
Incat Crowther and the Damen Group are major builders of yacht support vessels. Florida based Shadow Marine converts offshore supply vessels into yacht support vessels.

== See also ==
- List of yacht support vessels by length
- Wayfinder (2021 yacht)
- Fulk Al Salamah (2016 yacht)
