= Dubai (yacht) =

Superyacht owned by the Ruler of Dubai

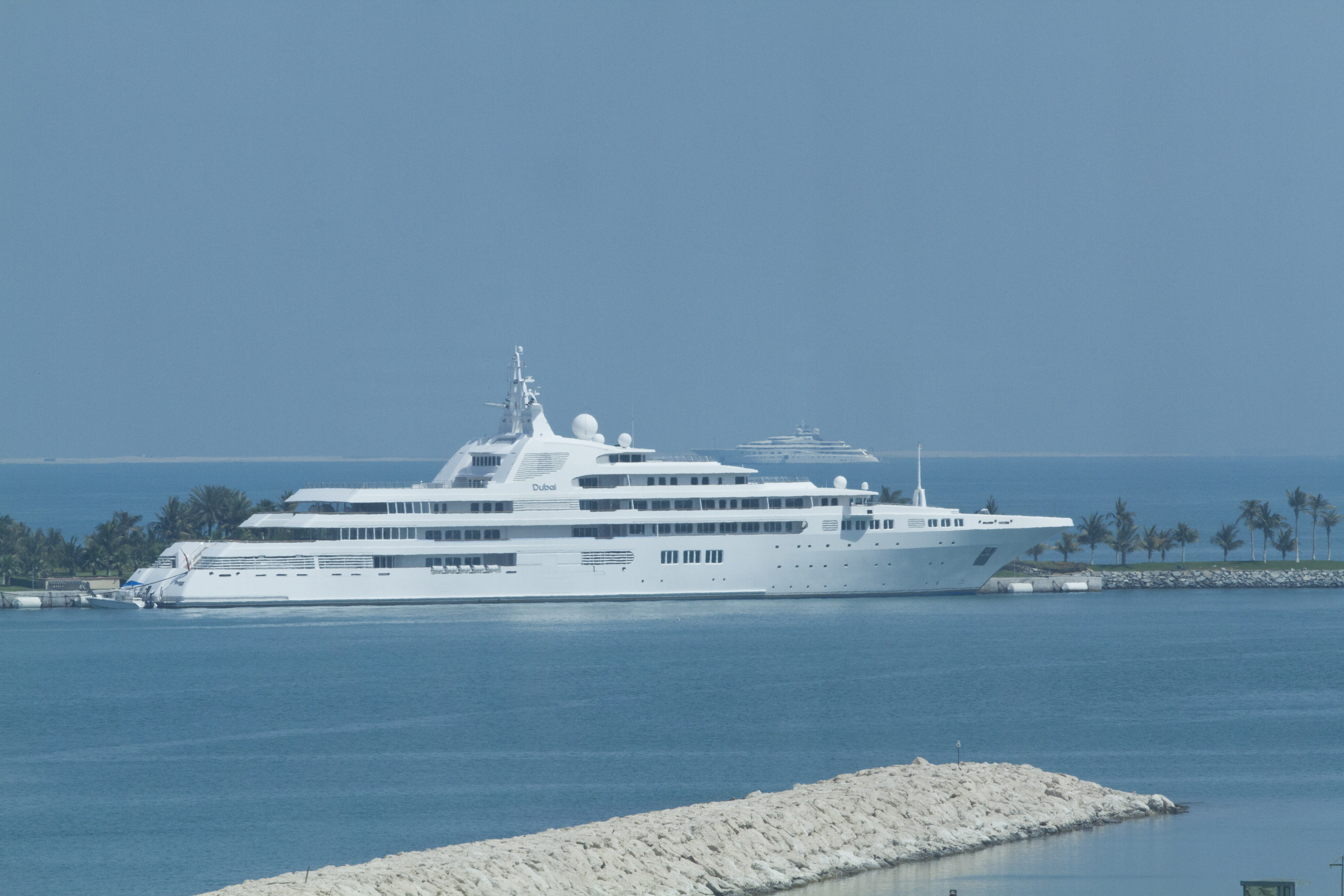
- Dubai (March 2013)

History

Emirate of Dubai
- Name: Dubai
- Namesake: Emirate of Dubai
- Owner: Sheikh Mohammed bin Rashid Al Maktoum
- Builder: Blohm+Voss
- Cost: US$400 million
- Launched: 15 June 1998
- Completed: 26 October 2006
- Status: in active service

General characteristics
- Class & type: Motor yacht
- Tonnage: 13,470 GT
- Displacement: 9,150 t (9,005 long tons)
- Length: 162 m (531 ft 6 in)
- Beam: 22 m (72 ft 2 in)
- Height: 9.26 m (30 ft 5 in)
- Draft: 5 m (16 ft 5 in)
- Propulsion: Dual shaft of 2 MTU 20V1163TB93 6,323 kW (8,479 hp)
- Speed: 26 knots (48 km/h; 30 mph)
- Range: 8,500 nmi (15,700 km)
- Crew: 88

Dubai is a 162-metre (531 ft 6 in) superyacht owned by Sheikh Mohammed bin Rashid Al Maktoum, the current ruler of Dubai, who serves as the vice president, prime minister, and minister of defense of the United Arab Emirates (UAE).

== History ==
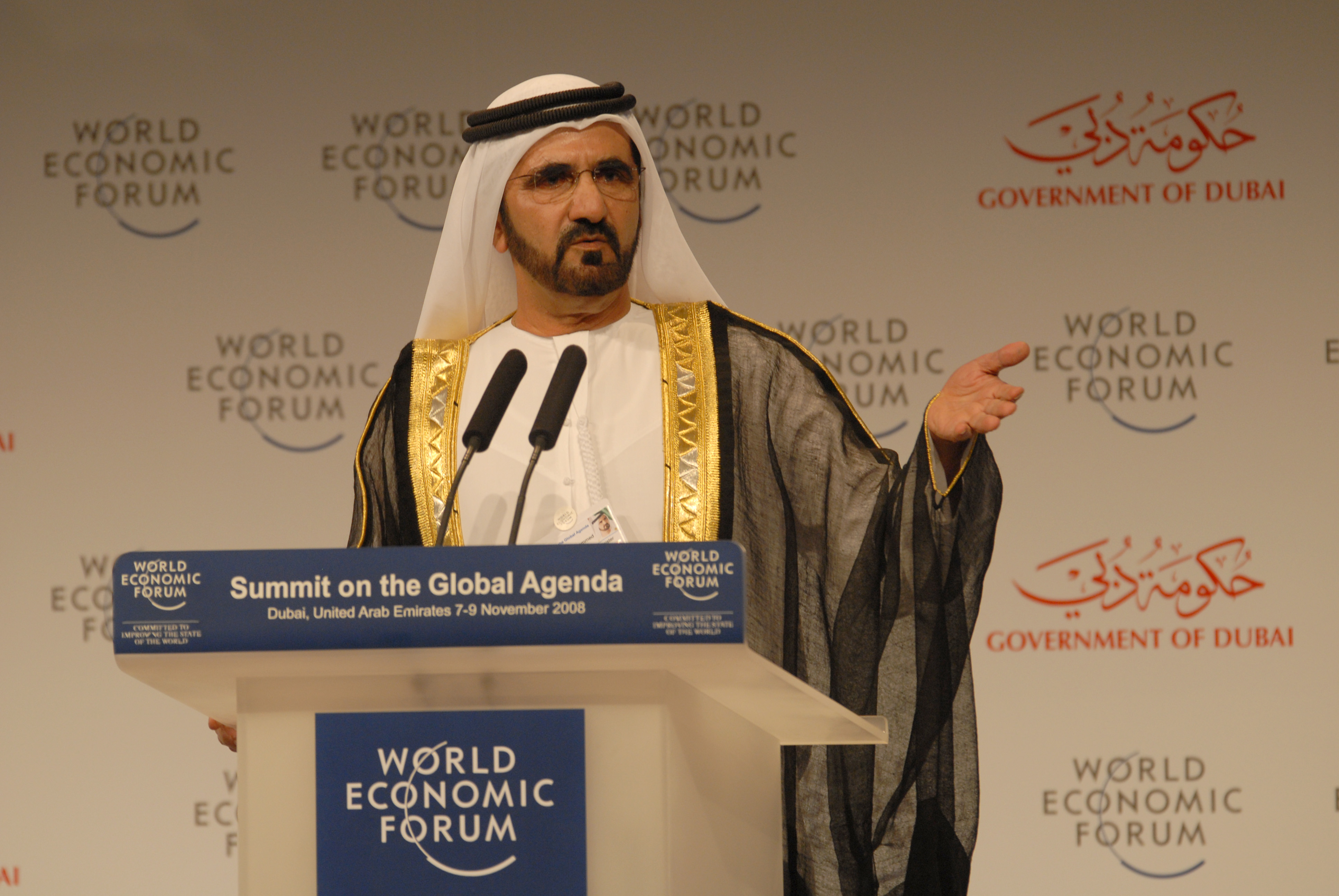
Mohammed Bin Rashid Al Maktoum at the World Economic Forum Summit on the Global Agenda in 2008.

Dubai was commissioned in 1995 under various project names (Panhandle, Platinum, Golden Star) and was built in cooperation with the German shipyards Blohm+Voss and Lürssen.

The yacht was initially built for Prince Jefri Bolkiah of Brunei before 1996, but the client stopped the purchase contract the next year.

In 2001, she went to the current owner, Mohammed bin Rashid Al Maktoum. The yacht was designed by Andrew Winch, with interior design by Platinum Yachts. She cost approximately $400 million U.S. dollars.

The ship including the floating dock was transported by the MV Blue Marlin via Turkey to Dubai. The Dubai-based Platinum Yachts FZCO shipyard continued to build the yacht under the former project name Platinum and handed her over to the owner in 2006.

The yacht is kept in front of the northern of the two artificial islands, the private island of Mohammed bin Rashid Al Maktoum.

From 2006 to 2009, the yacht was the largest yacht in the world with a length of 162 meters, but was replaced by Eclipse and Azzam.

== Equipment ==
The equipment includes a helipad up to a maximum of 9.5 tons, two 10 m long motor boats, a dining room for 90 guests and a 10 m swimming pool. The yacht also has a disco, a cinema, 20 water bikes, a submarine, a lobster tank and a squash court. Dubai is divided into eight decks and she provides space for up to 88 crew members and 115 guests.

The four MTU-20V diesel engines can each deliver 6,301 kW and can give the ship a speed of up to 26 knots. With the 1.2 million litre diesel tanks, Dubai is able to travel 8,500 nautical miles.

== See also ==
- List of motor yachts by length
