= Quintessentially One =

Quintessentially One is a 220-meter superyacht being built by the concierge firm Quintessentially, at a cost of about the €250 million.

When complete, it will be 40 metres longer than Azzam, the world's largest private yacht, owned by Sheikh Khalifa bin Zayed Al Nahyan. Debt financing from Norway and Italy has been secured, where the yacht itself will be built and fitted out.
