= Oman Royal Yacht Squadron =

- Royal Standard of the Sultan of Oman
- Country: Sultanate of Oman
- Allegiance: Oman
- Role: Luxury Seagoing VIP Transport
- Part of: The Diwan of Royal Court Affairs
- Main operating base: Muscat and Muttrah ports, Oman
- Paint scheme on major vessels: All over cream with blue highlights

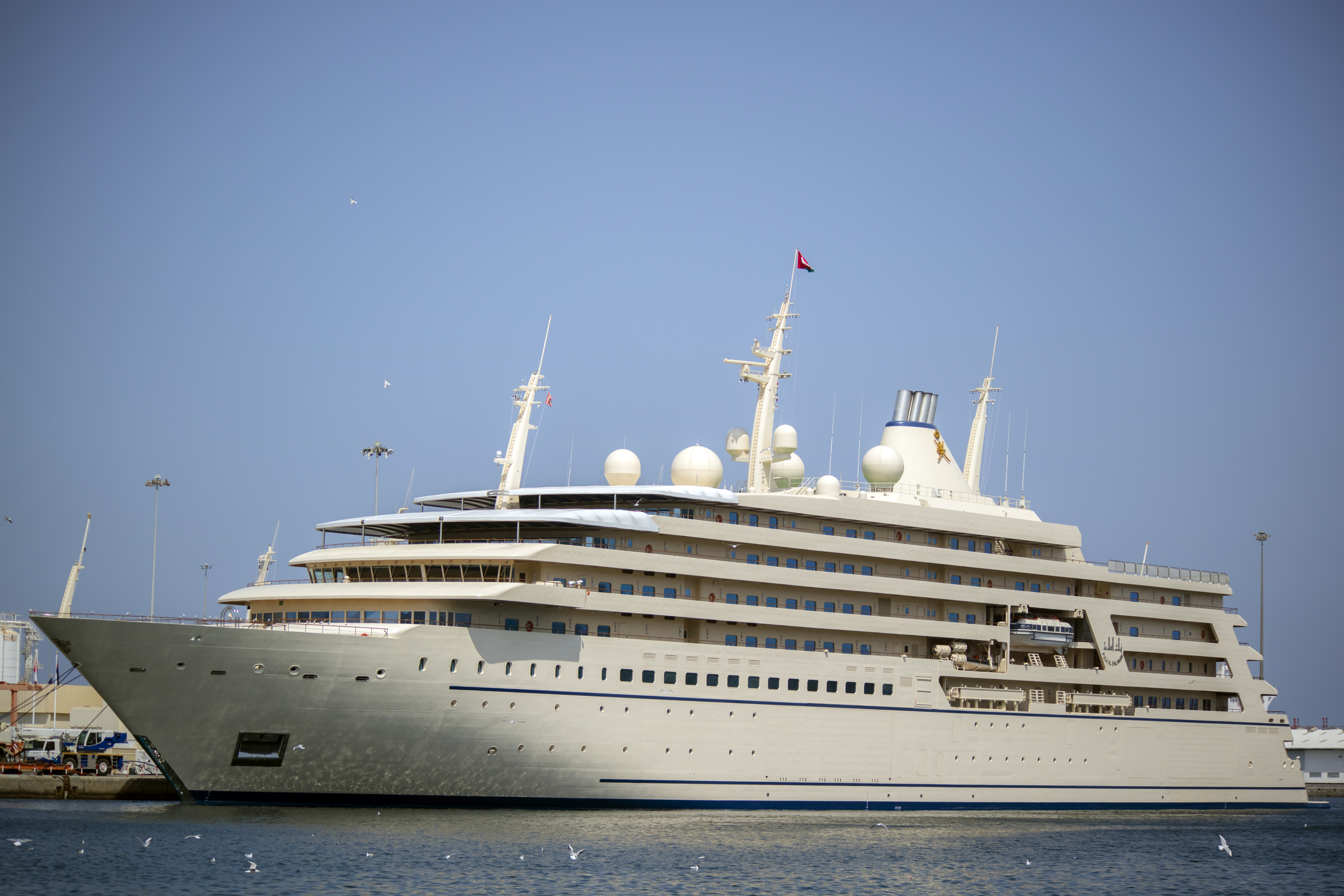
The Fulk al Salamah, the Sultan's secondary yacht, moored at the docks at Mina Qaboos, Muttrah

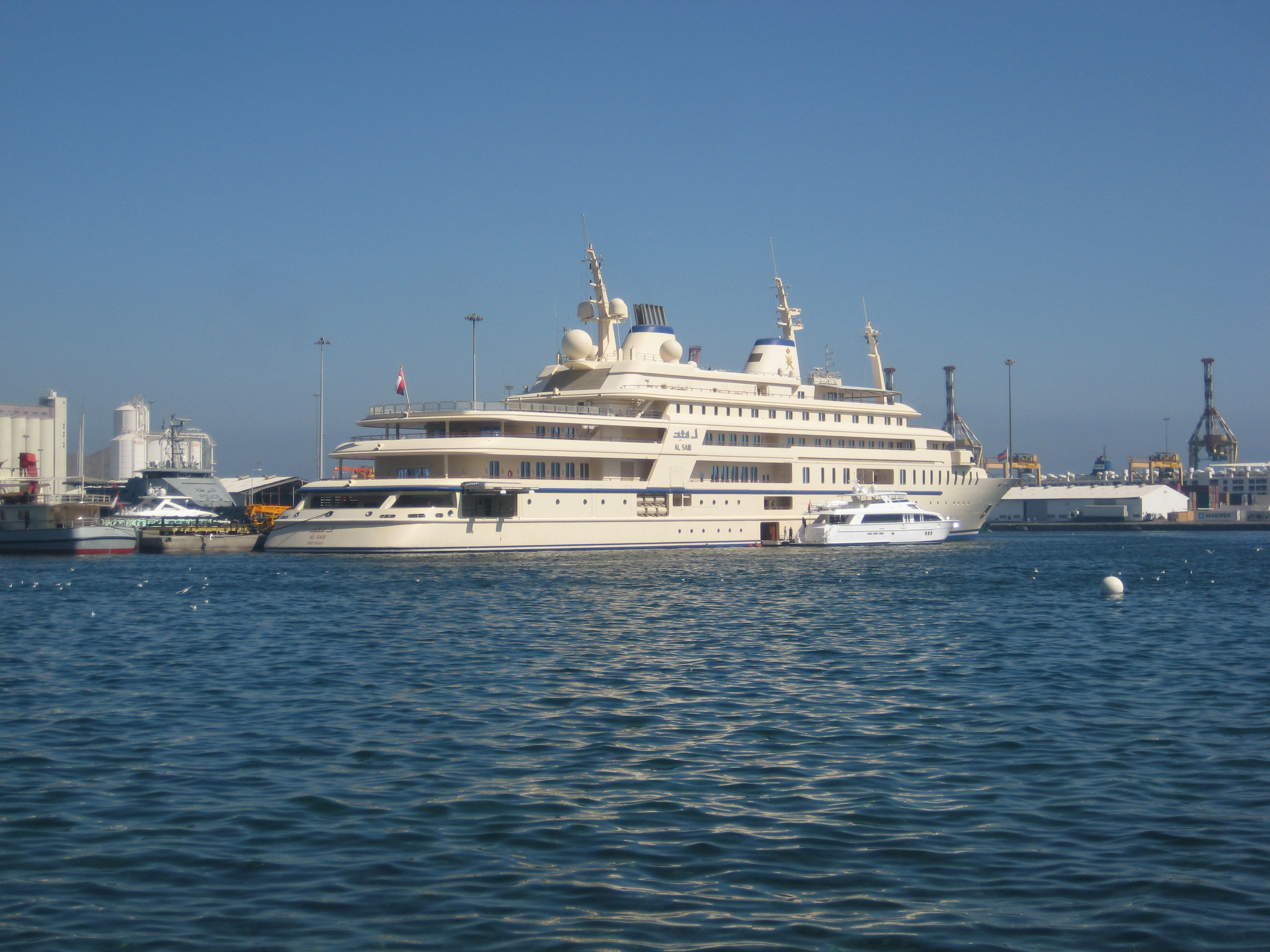
Al Said from the stern, moored at Mina Qaboos

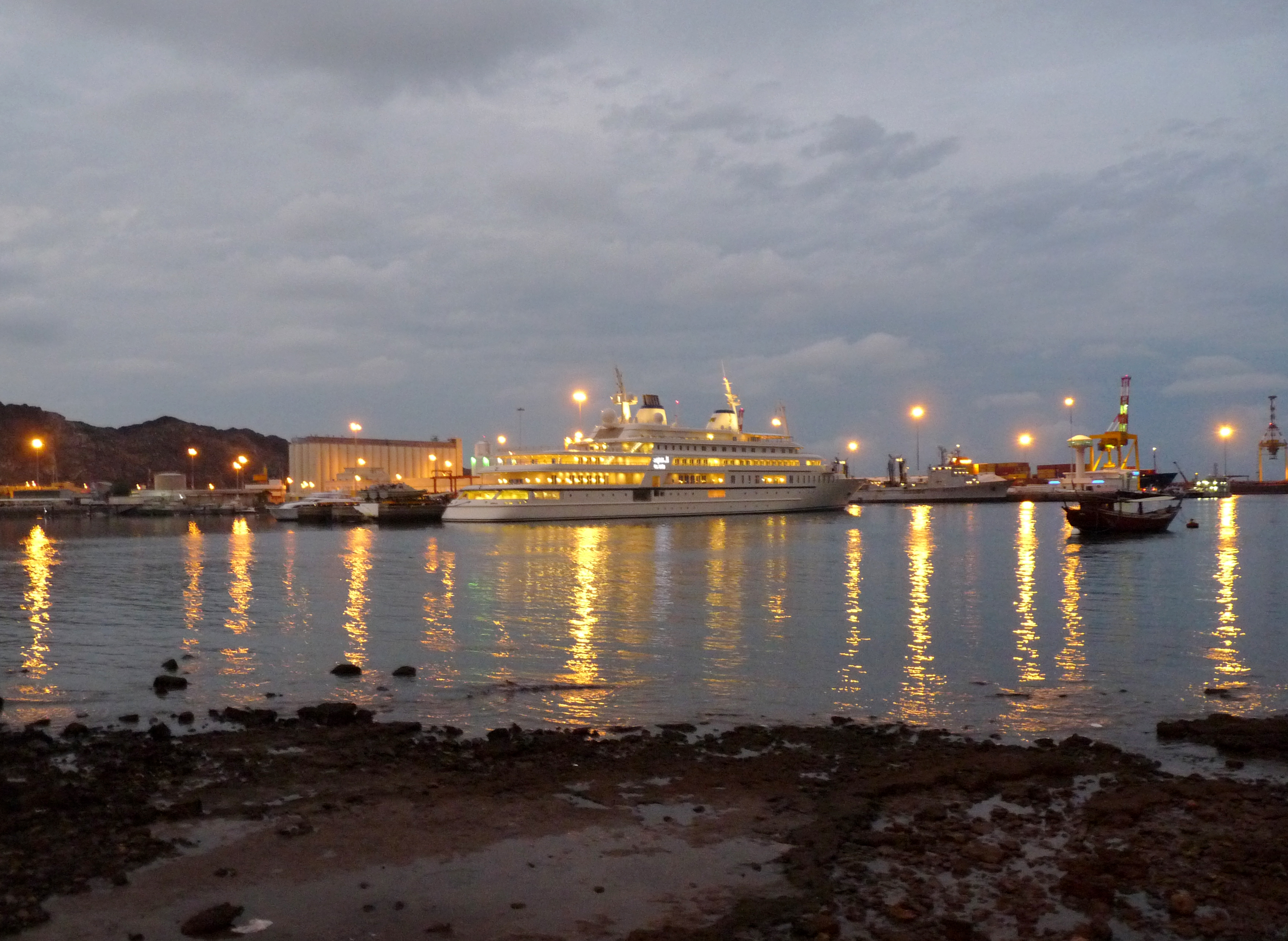
The Oman Royal Yacht Squadron moorings at Mina Qaboos at dusk

The Oman Royal Yacht Squadron is the Sultan of Oman's personal fleet of pleasure craft ranging from the grand Al Said through to the traditional wooden-hulled sailing vessel Zinat al Bihaar.

The Squadron is totally independent of the Royal Navy of Oman and the Royal Guard of Oman and is administered by the Diwan of Royal Court Affairs.

The Squadron's personnel strength is 150.

== Bases ==
The Oman Royal Yacht Squadron has two permanent operating bases:

- Muscat Harbor adjacent to Fort Mirani: offices, maintenance areas and a slipway
- Muttrah Harbor: specifically dedicated moorings at Port Sultan Qaboos (Mina Sultan Qaboos)

The port of Raysut (near Salalah) will also be a temporary berthing location for the Squadron's vessels when required.

== Current inventory ==
The Squadron operates the following vessels:

Vessel Name	Builder & Country of Origin	Type	Length	IMO number	Notes
Major Vessels
Al Said	Lürssen Werft, Bremen Germany	Principal Royal Yacht	155m	9463774	Delivered 2008
Fulk al Salamah	Mariotti Yachts, Genoa Italy	Secondary Royal Yacht & support vessel	164m	9714460	Delivered 2016
Al Noores	Damen Shipyard, Hardinxveld-Giessendam Netherlands	Ocean-going tug and fire tender vessel		9234240	Delivered 2001
Zinat al Bihaar	Port Qaboos, Muttrah Oman	large sailing yacht (Royal Baghlah)		1004572	Delivered 1988
Smaller Vessels
Al Murrih		Luxury short haul coastal cruiser		NA	Seen at Mina Qaboos in 2016
Shafaq al Fajar	Sunseeker, United Kingdom	Luxury short haul 27 meter Sports Yacht		NA	Seen at Mina Qaboos and under power in 2016

== Former inventory ==
Vessel Name	Builder & Country of Origin	Type	Length	IMO number	Notes
Major Vessels
Al Dhaferah	Bremer Vulkan, Bremen-Vegesack Germany	Logistics and helicopter support vessel	125m	8509026	Previously named Fulk Al Salamah. Delivered 1987 Scrapped in 2024

== See also ==
- List of motor yachts by length
