= Gulf of Oman =

Arabian Sea link to the Indian Ocean

- خليج عمان (Arabic)
- Interactive map of Gulf of Oman
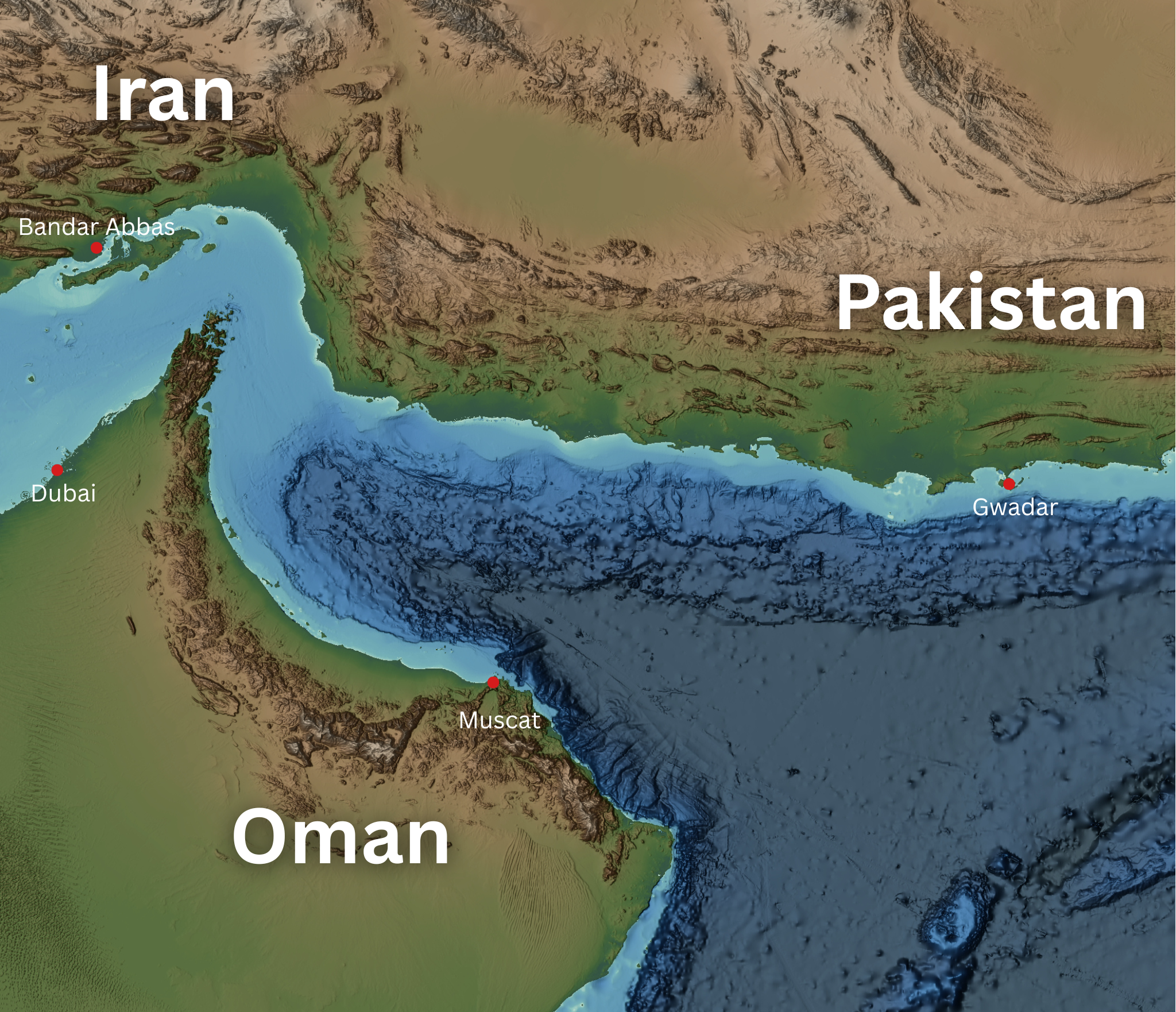
- Bathymetry of the Gulf of Oman
- Location: West Asia and South Asia
- Coordinates: 25°N 58°E
- Type: Sea
- Ocean/sea sources: Indian Ocean, Arabian Sea
- Basin countries: List: Oman Pakistan Iran United Arab Emirates
- Max. width: 340 km (210 mi)
- Surface area: 115,000 km^{2} (44,000 sq mi)
- Max. depth: 3,700 m (12,100 ft)

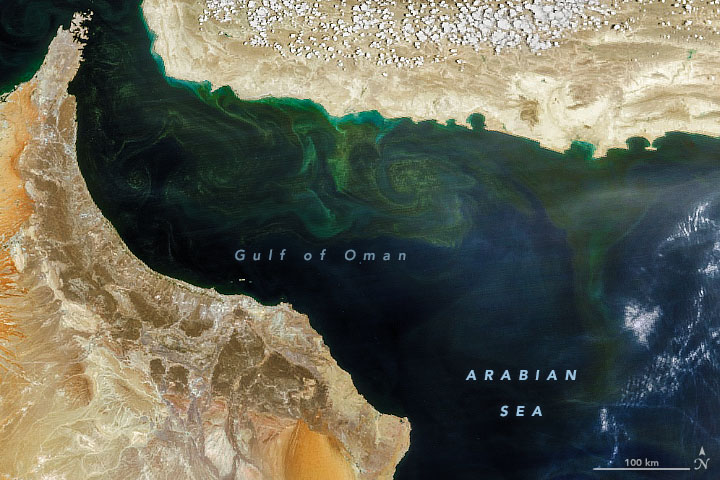
A satellite view of Iran, Pakistan and the Gulf of Oman.

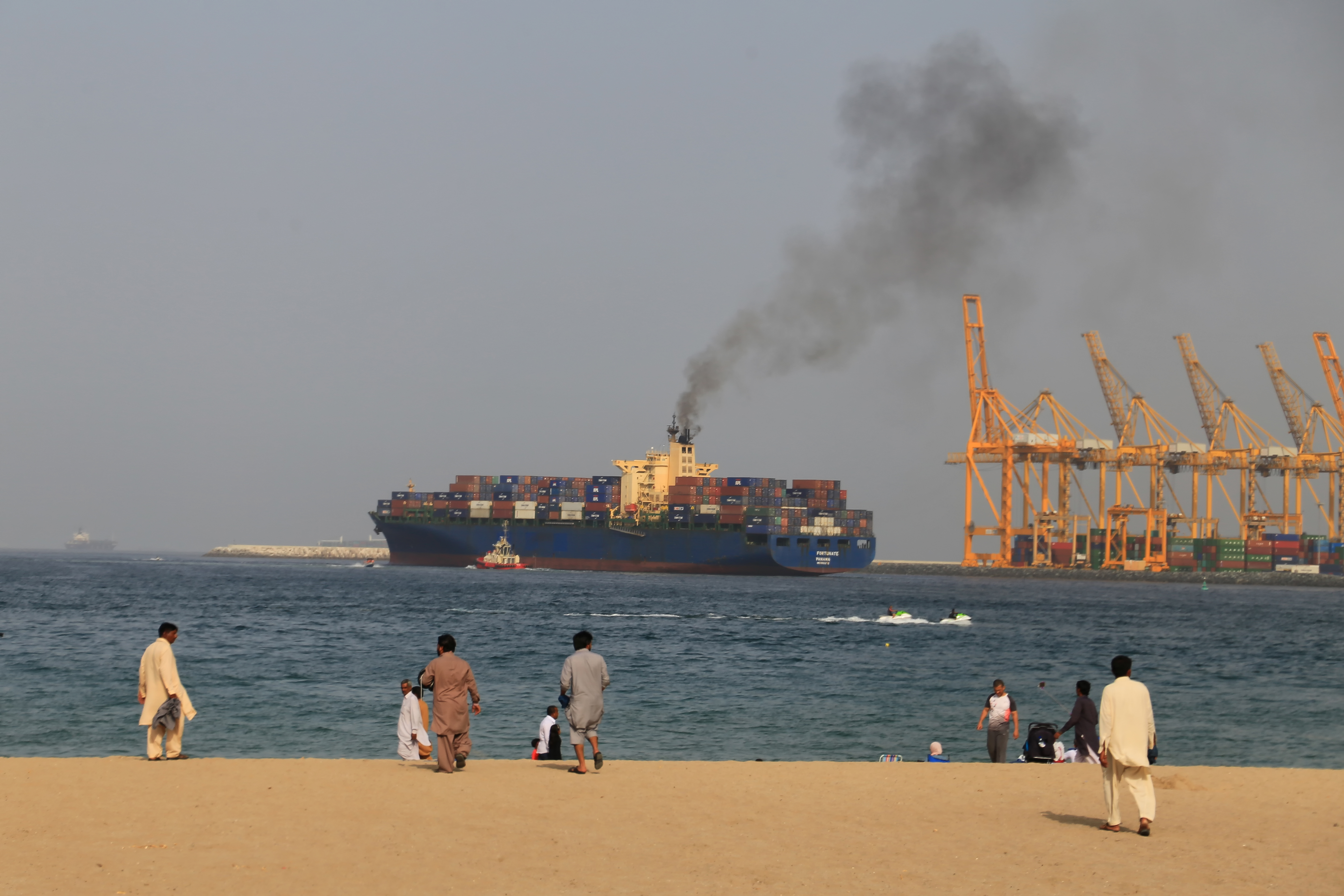
Khor Fakkan, a city in the Emirate of Sharjah, has one of the major container ports in the eastern seaboard of the United Arab Emirates.

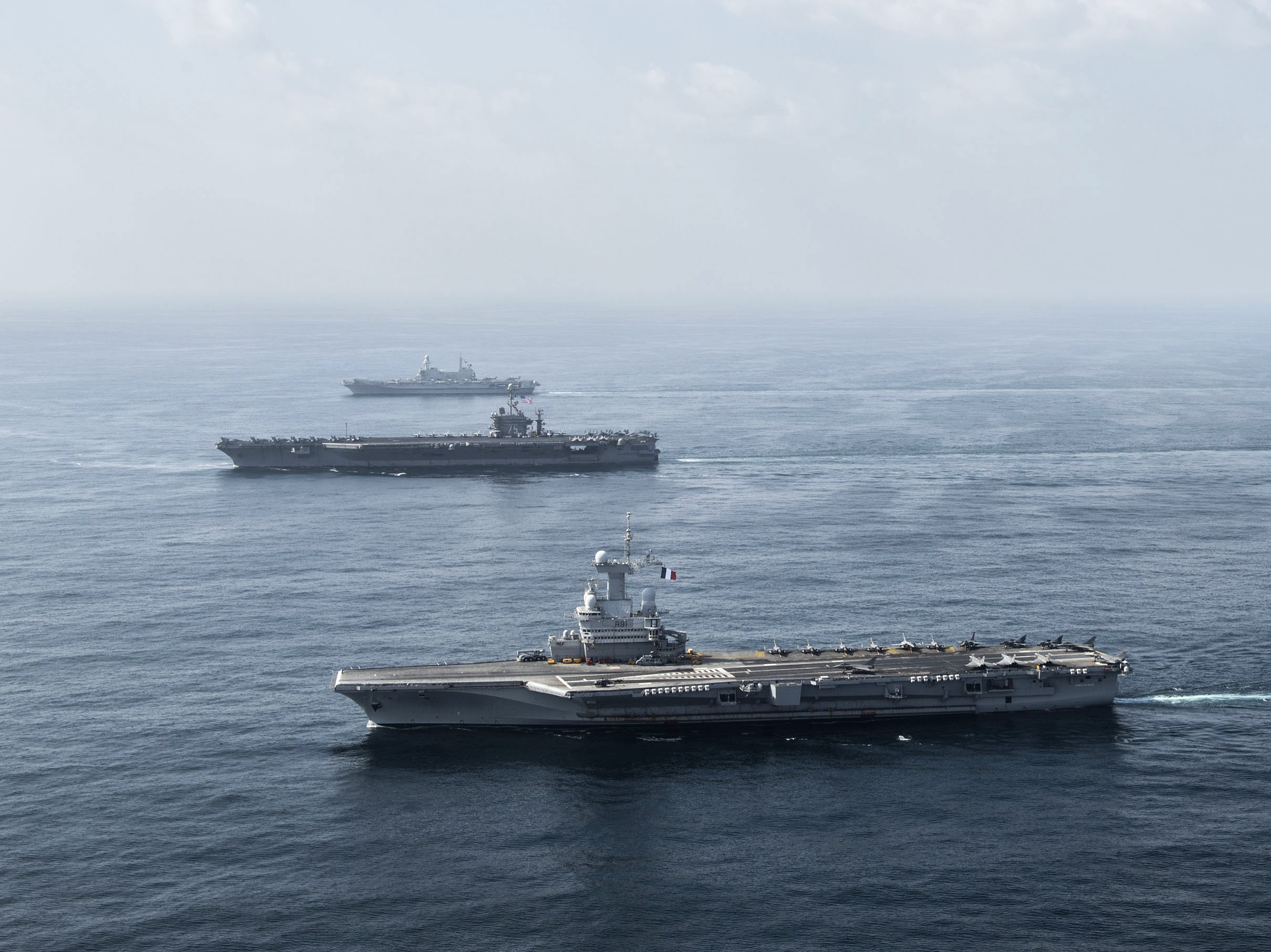
U.S. Navy, French Navy, and Italian Navy aircraft carriers conduct operations in the U.S. 5th Fleet area of responsibility in the Gulf of Oman.

The Gulf of Oman or Sea of Oman, (Note: Arabic: خليج عمان khalīj ʿumān; Persian: دریای عمان daryâ-ye omân)) also known as Gulf of Makran or Sea of Makran, (Note: (Arabic: خلیج مکران khalīj makrān; Persian: دریای مکران daryâ-ye makrān)) is a gulf in the Indian Ocean that connects the Arabian Sea with the Strait of Hormuz, which then runs to the Persian Gulf. It borders Iran and Pakistan on the north, Oman on the south, and the United Arab Emirates on the west.

== Extent ==
The International Hydrographic Organization defines the limits of the Gulf of Oman as follows:

- On the Northwest: A line joining Ràs Limah (25°57′N) on the coast of Arabia and Ràs al Kuh (25°48′N) on the coast of Iran (Persia).
- On the Southeast: The Northern limit of the Arabian Sea [A line joining Ràs al Hadd, East point of Arabia (22°32'N) and Ràs Jiyùni (61°43'E) on the coast of Pakistan].

== Exclusive economic zone ==
Exclusive economic zones in Gulf of Oman:

| Number | Country | Area (Km^{2}) |
|---|---|---|
| 1 | Oman | 108,779 |
| 2 | Iran | 65,850 |
| 3 | United Arab Emirates | 4,371 |
| 4 | Pakistan | 2,000 |
| Total | Gulf of Oman | 181,000 |

== Bordering countries ==
Coastline length of bordering countries:

1. Iran: 850 km (530 mi)
2. Oman: 750 km (470 mi)
3. United Arab Emirates: 50 km (31 mi)
4. Pakistan: 50 km (31 mi)

== Alternative names ==
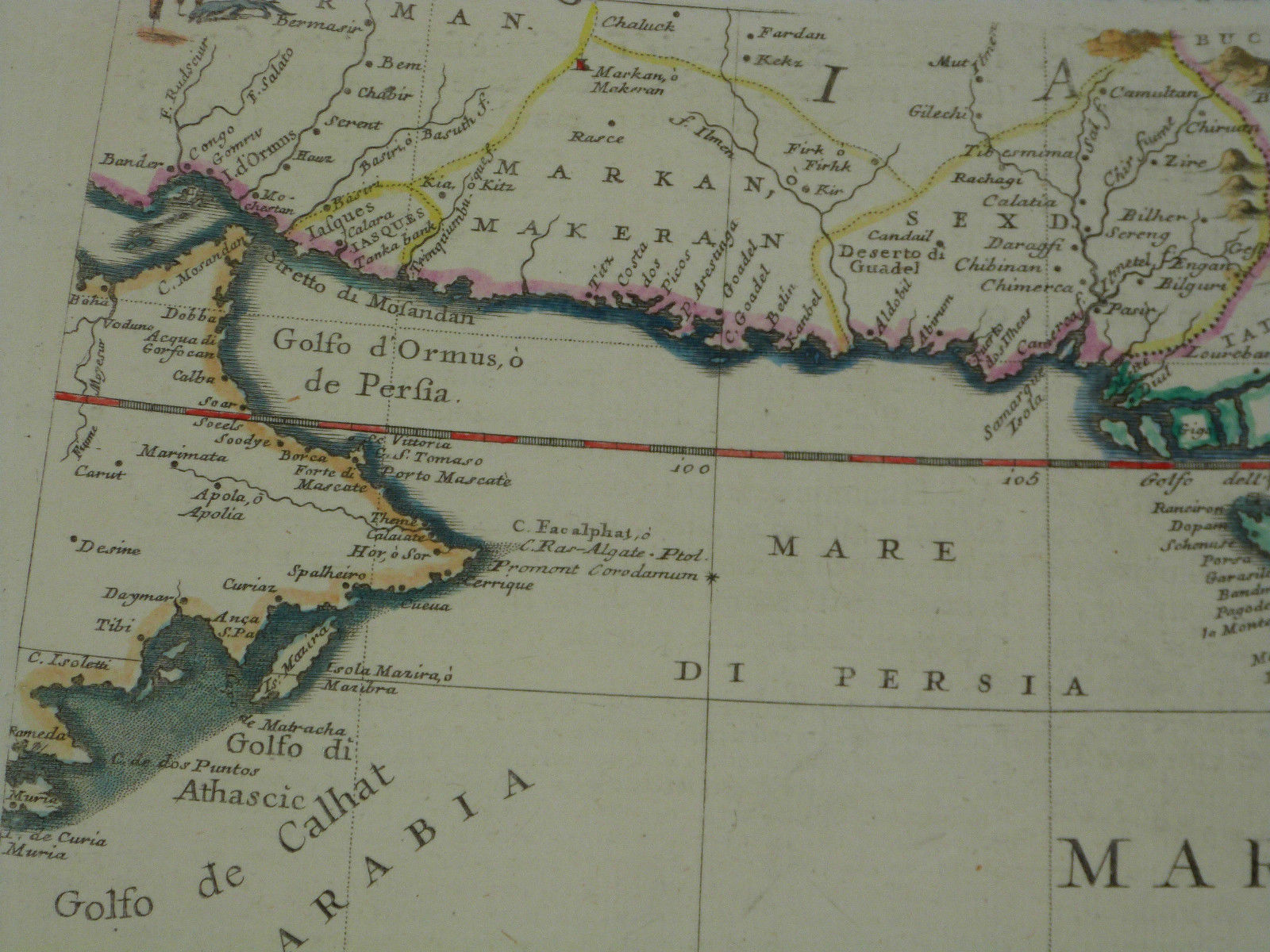
The western part of the Indian Ocean, by Vincenzo Maria Coronelli, 1693 from his system of global gores the Makran coast

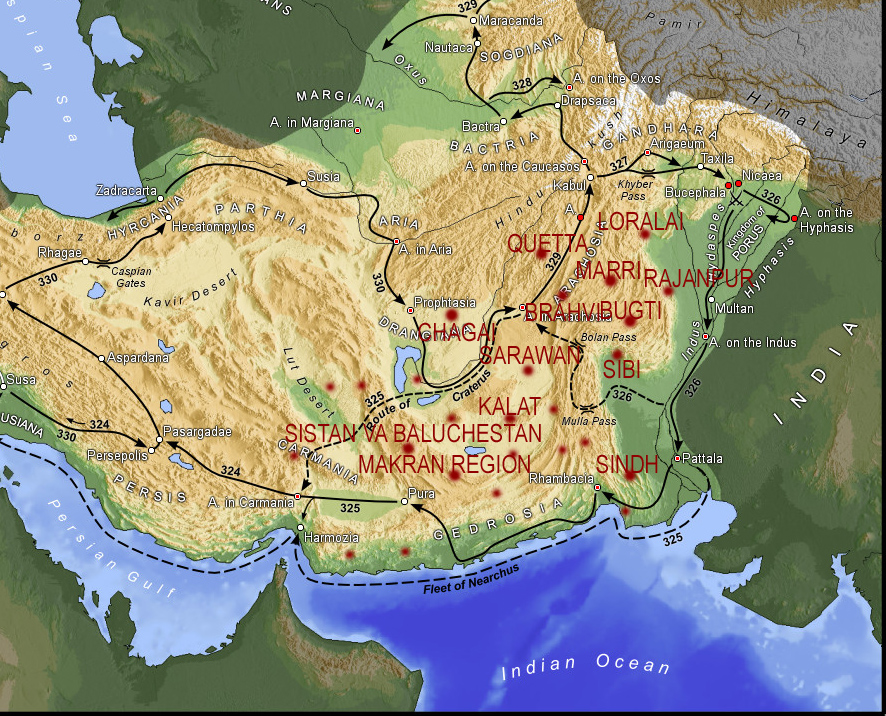
Paths that Alexander the Great took

The Gulf of Oman historically and geographically has been referred to by different names by Arabian, Iranian, Indian, Pakistani, and European geographers and travelers, including Makran Sea and Akhzar Sea.

1. Makran Sea
2. Akhzar Sea
3. Persian Sea (consists of the whole of the Persian Gulf and Gulf of Oman)

Until the 18th century, it was known as Makran Sea and is also visible on historical maps and museums.

== Major ports ==
- Port of Fujairah, Fujairah, United Arab Emirates
- Khor Fakkan Container Terminal, Khor Fakkan, United Arab Emirates
- Port of Chabahar, Chabahar, Iran
- Port Sultan Qaboos, Muttrah, Oman

== International trade ==
The Western side of the gulf connects to the Strait of Hormuz, a strategic route through which a third of the world's liquefied natural gas and 20% of global oil consumption passes from Middle East producers.

== Ecology ==
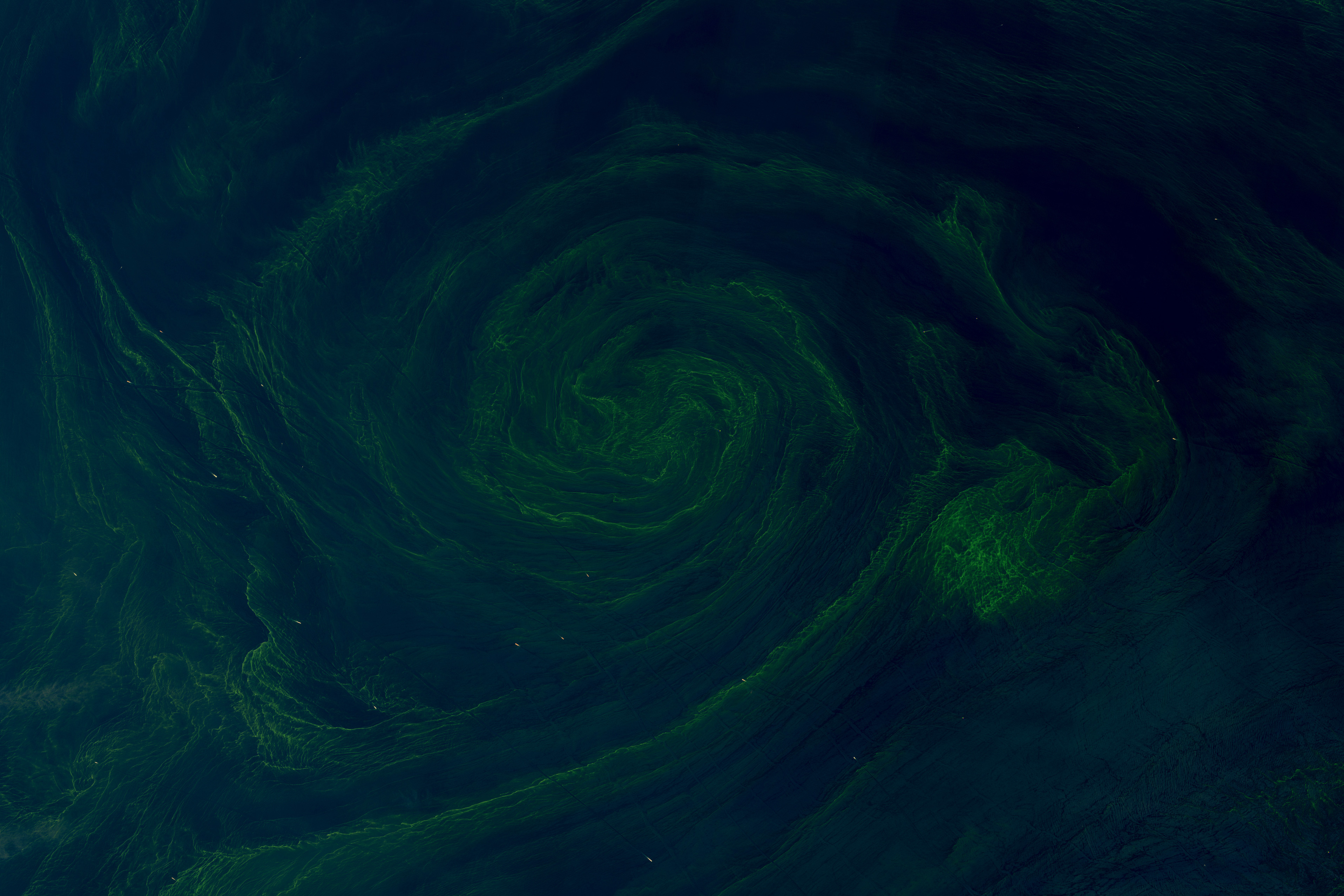
A bloom of phytoplankton in the Gulf of Oman, seen on 8 March 2025

In 2018, scientists confirmed the Gulf of Oman contains one of the world's largest marine dead zones, where the ocean contains little or no oxygen and marine wildlife cannot exist. The dead zone encompasses nearly the entire 165,000-square-kilometre (63,700 sq mi) Gulf of Oman and equivalent to the size of Florida, United States of America. The cause is a combination of increased ocean warming and increased runoff of nitrogen and phosphorus from fertilizers.

== International underwater rail tunnel ==
In 2018, a rail tunnel under the sea was suggested to link the UAE with the western coast of India. The bullet train tunnel would be supported by pontoons and be nearly 2,000 kilometres (1,200 mi) in length.

== See also ==
- Eastern Arabia
- General Maritime Treaty of 1820
- History of the United Arab Emirates#Pearling and the subsequent section
- Musandam Peninsula
- Saeed bin Butti#Perpetual Maritime Truce
- Sultan bin Saqr Al Qasimi#Perpetual Maritime Truce of 1853
- Incidents:
  - Persian Gulf campaign of 1809
  - Persian Gulf campaign of 1819
  - May 2019 Gulf of Oman incident
  - June 2019 Gulf of Oman incident
