= Wayfinder (2021 yacht) =

2021 Supply yacht

Wayfinder is a luxury supply yacht or auxiliary boat, of a type often referred as a supply vessel, shadow cat, shadow boat or yacht support vessel; ultimately, it is a yacht tender. Its task is to supply a pleasure yacht. A catamaran, its length is 68 metres, with a beam of 14 metres. Its main function is to provide its mothership with fossil fuel, foodstores, parts, and maintenance employees; it also serves as its heliport. Its fuel capacity is 200,000 litres, equivalent to 52,834 US gallons, to power its Diesel engines. In 2021, it sailed under the flag of the Cayman Islands.

== Build ==
The yacht is a multihull, specifically, a catamaran, built in aluminium and featuring four decks. It was built by Astilleros Armón Burela, of Navia, Asturias, at is Burela shipyard, in La Mariña Central, Galicia; it was the largest boat built there to date. Its designer is Incat Crowther, an Australian company, and the technical advisor is YCTS, a U.S. company. Interior design is by Oliver Design, a Basque firm. The catamaran's dimensions are 68.2 metres of length, 14 of beam, and a draught of 2.40 metres. It features a heliport. An internal hangar stores helicopter and lifeboat. In addition, it transports several pleasure boats, including fast launches, diving equipment, quads, motorcycles, and a minisubmarine. It can hold up to three 12-metre auxiliary boats each inside the hangar, plus two smaller ones on deck.

Due to its dimensions, Wayfinder is considered a megayacht. It is crewed by 18 employees.

The yacht's maximum speed is 21 knots, which is equivalent to 39 kilometers per hour, on account of to two engines of 3,850 horsepower each (CV), which consume diesel fuel.

The boat was launched on December 10, 2020, and it is only the second megayacht supply ship built as a catamaran. Unusually, the vessel was launched without being baptized, in order to maintain confidentiality about the true name of the yacht.

== Functions ==
The main function of the yacht is to furnish, maintain, support, or assist the owner's main yacht. In fact, apart from the crew, Wayfinder has built-in space for 14 passenger employees, who are part of the primary yacht's technical team. The boat features ample warehouse space that can be repurposed for multiple uses. In late 2021, it was reported that Wayfinder may have carried a 30-member security detail.

Like any other modern vessel, it has an internal garbage dump, so that solid waste is deposited in harbour. Additionally, it features the laundry, pantries, workshops and spare parts warehouses.

== Ownership ==
Some sources attribute ownership to Bill Gates. Nonetheless, other sources report Gates has denied such ownership. During construction it was impossible to reveal the owner, due to strict contract "shielded confidentiality"; however, it was revealed that it was one of the top ranked in wealth according to Forbes magazine's list.

Gates was said to have put Wayfinder up for sale in 2024.
