= Eclipse (yacht) =

Superyacht owned by Roman Abramovich

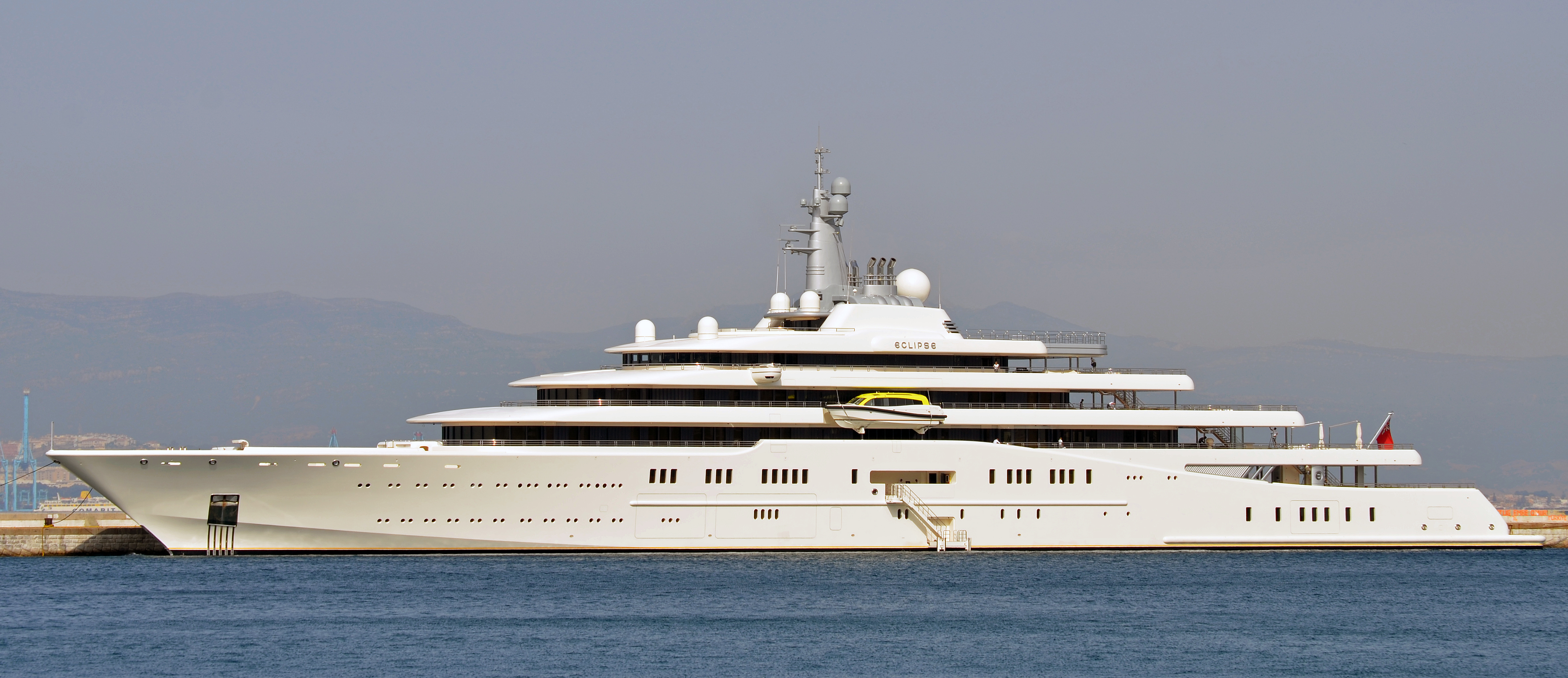
- Eclipse docked in Gibraltar in August 2012

History
- Name: Eclipse
- Owner: Roman Abramovich
- Port of registry: Hamilton, Bermuda
- Builder: Blohm+Voss
- Cost: $590 million (as of September 2011)
- Launched: 12 June 2009
- In service: 9 December 2010
- Identification: IMO number: 1009613; MMSI number: 310593000; Callsign: ZCDX4
- Status: In use

General characteristics
- Type: Motor yacht
- Tonnage: 13,000 GT
- Length: 162.5 m (533 ft)
- Beam: 22.00 m (72 ft 2 in)
- Draft: 5.90 m (19 ft 4 in)
- Installed power: 29.6 MW (39,700 hp)
- Propulsion: 4× MTU 20V 1163 TB93 diesel engines, triple screw propellers
- Speed: 40.74 km/h (22.00 kn)
- Boats & landing craft carried: 1 mini-submarine, 3 landing boats
- Crew: 70 crew members
- Aviation facilities: 2 helicopter pads

M/Y Eclipse is a superyacht built by Blohm+Voss of Hamburg, Germany, the third longest private yacht afloat. Her exterior and interior were designed by Terence Disdale. The yacht is owned by Russian businessman Roman Abramovich, and was delivered on 9 December 2010. At 162.5 metres (533 ft 2 in) long Eclipse was the world's longest private yacht until Azzam was launched in April 2013, which is 17.3 metres (56 ft 9 in) longer. The yacht's cost has been estimated at €340 million.

== Features ==
Eclipse has two helicopter pads, 24 guest cabins, two swimming pools, several hot tubs, and a disco hall. She is also equipped with three launch boats and a mini-submarine that is capable of submerging to 50 metres (160 ft). Approximately 70 crew members are needed to operate the yacht and serve the guests.

For security, Eclipse is fitted with a missile detection system and self-defense systems.

By 2009, Eclipse was also the largest vessel employing a rotor-based stabilization system against roll motion at anchor and at low cruise speeds, based on the Magnus effect.

== History ==
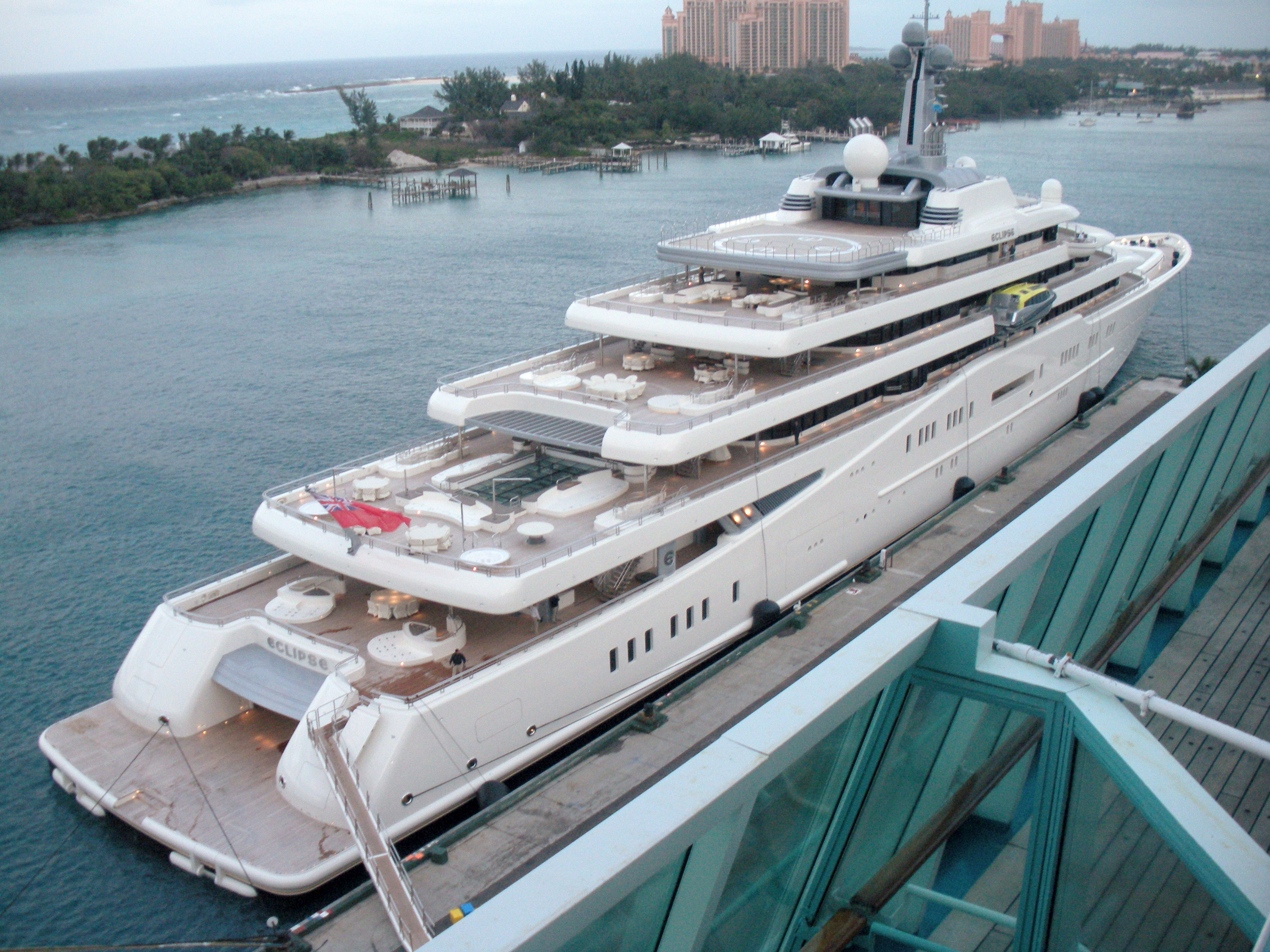
Eclipse docked in Nassau in January 2011

Eclipse was launched on 12 June 2009. She arrived in Frederikshavn, Denmark, on 18 September 2009, for sea trials, and was delivered to Abramovich on 9 December 2010. First pictures of the completed yacht were taken at Kristiansand, Norway, during her refuelling.

In February 2011 Eclipse was made available for charter through SuperYachtsMonaco, a Monaco-based yacht brokerage company.

Eclipse travels to St. Martin in the Caribbean each winter to pick up guests who fly in to St. Martin's airport. The yacht then travels to Abramovich's home on nearby St. Barts. In March 2022 Forbes reported that Eclipse was still owned by Abramovich. Since the Russian invasion of Ukraine, the yacht has anchored in Turkish territorial waters on the South Aegean coast of Muğla Province. She has been seen at Bodrum and Marmaris, and was still registered in Bermuda with value of $438 million.
