= Port Sultan Qaboos =

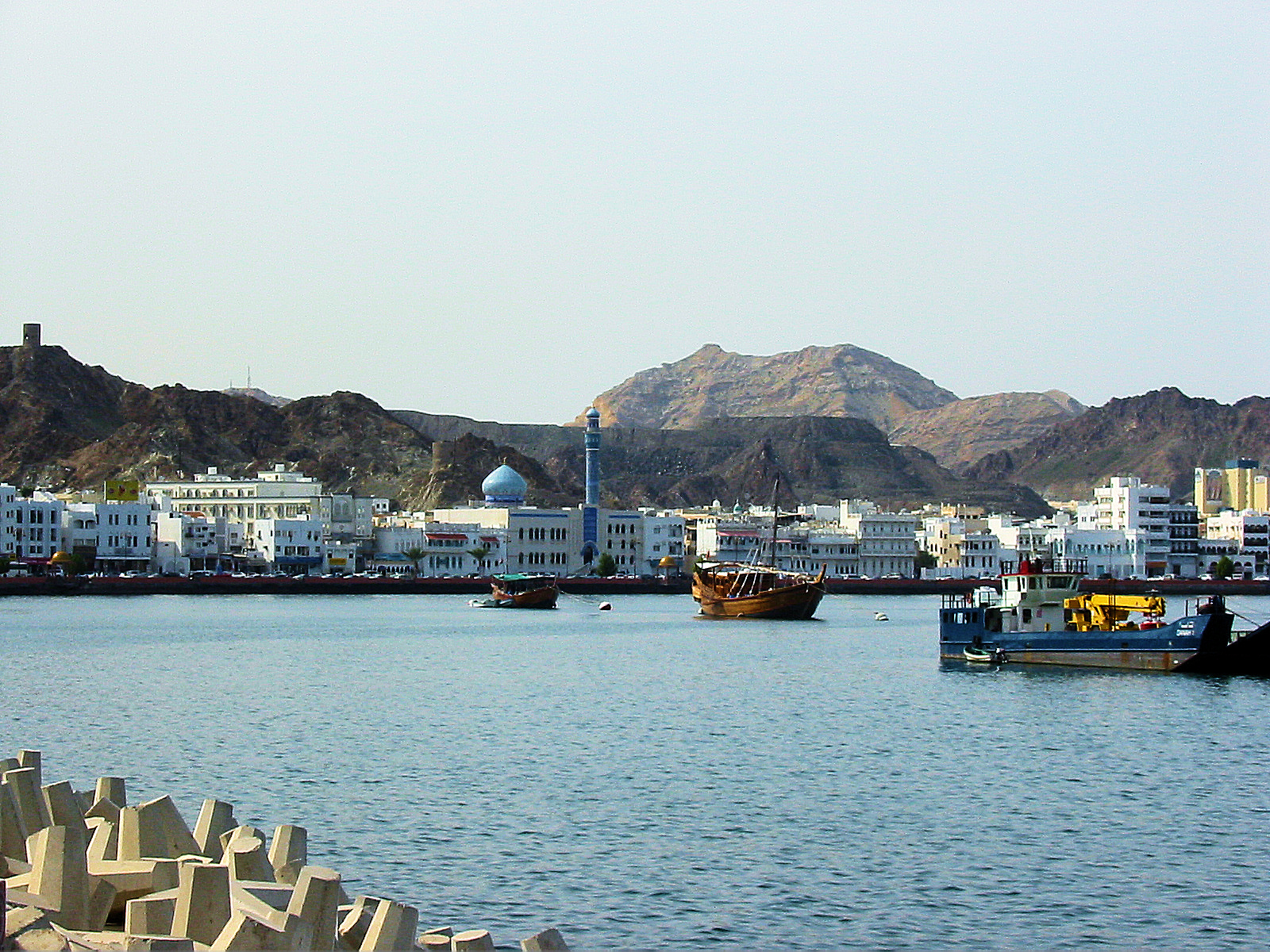
- Click on the map for a fullscreen view
- Port Sultan Qaboos (Oman)

Location
- Country: Oman
- Location: Muttrah, Muscat Governorate
- Coordinates: 23°37′41″N 58°34′4″E

Details
- Opened: 1974
- Operated by: Port Services Corporation S.A.O.G.
- Owned by: Port Services Corporation S.A.O.G.
- Type of harbour: Seaport
- No. of berths: 14
- Employees: 700 plus

Port Sultan Qaboos (previously known as Mina Qaboos) is the largest port in Muscat, Oman. Originally developed as part of a "Greater Muttrah" plan initiated by Qaboos bin Said al Said's predecessor, Said bin Taimur, the port’s construction was completed in the 1970s. It is operated and managed by Port Services Corporation S.A.O.G..

On 31 August 2014, the Ministry of Transport and Communications announced that the port would cease commercial operations in preparation for its transformation into a dedicated cruise ship port. Cargo operations have since been relocated to Sohar Industrial Port in Sohar. The government has cited congested road traffic in Muscat as a reason for the move.

Port Sultan Qaboos also serves as the home port for the Oman Royal Yacht Squadron.

== See also ==
- Old Muscat
