= Fulk Al Salamah (2016 yacht) =

Luxury yacht launched in 2016

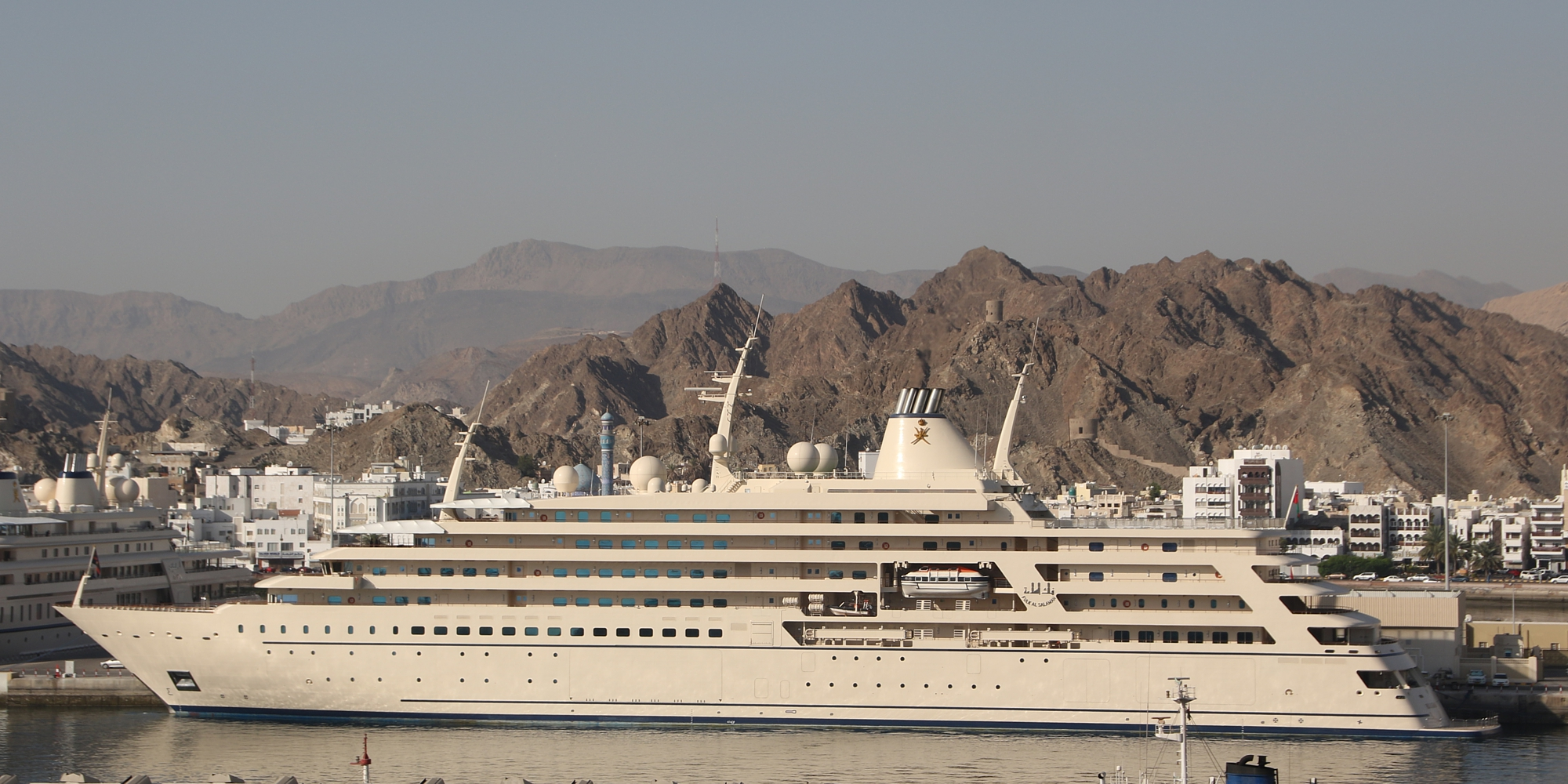
- Fulk al Salamah docked at Mina Sultan Qaboos in Muscat, Sultanate of Oman

History

Oman
- Name: Fulk Al Salamah (فلك السلامة)
- Owner: Omani Royal Family
- Ordered: 2014
- Builder: Mariotti Yachts
- Completed: July 2016
- Acquired: 28 July 2016
- Identification: IMO number: 9714460; MMSI number: 461002000; Callsign: A4JD
- Fate: in active service

General characteristics
- Type: Yacht
- Tonnage: 20,361 GT
- Length: 164 m (538 ft 1 in)
- Beam: 24 m (78 ft 9 in)
- Draught: 9.3 m (30 ft 6 in)
- Propulsion: Diesel-electric, producing 27.373 MW (36,708 bhp)

Fulk Al Salamah ('Ship of Peace') is a superyacht in service with the Oman Royal Yacht Squadron since her completion in 2016. She was first announced in 2014 as project Saffron. She joined the Lürssen superyacht Al Said in the capital Muscat as part of the royal fleet. At 164 metres (538 ft 1 in), Fulk Al Salamah is the second longest yacht in the world as of 2022. She replaced a previous ship called Fulk Al Salamah which was renamed Al Dhaferah.

== See also ==
- Oman Royal Yacht Squadron
- List of motor yachts by length
