= Azzam (2013 yacht) =

Private superyacht

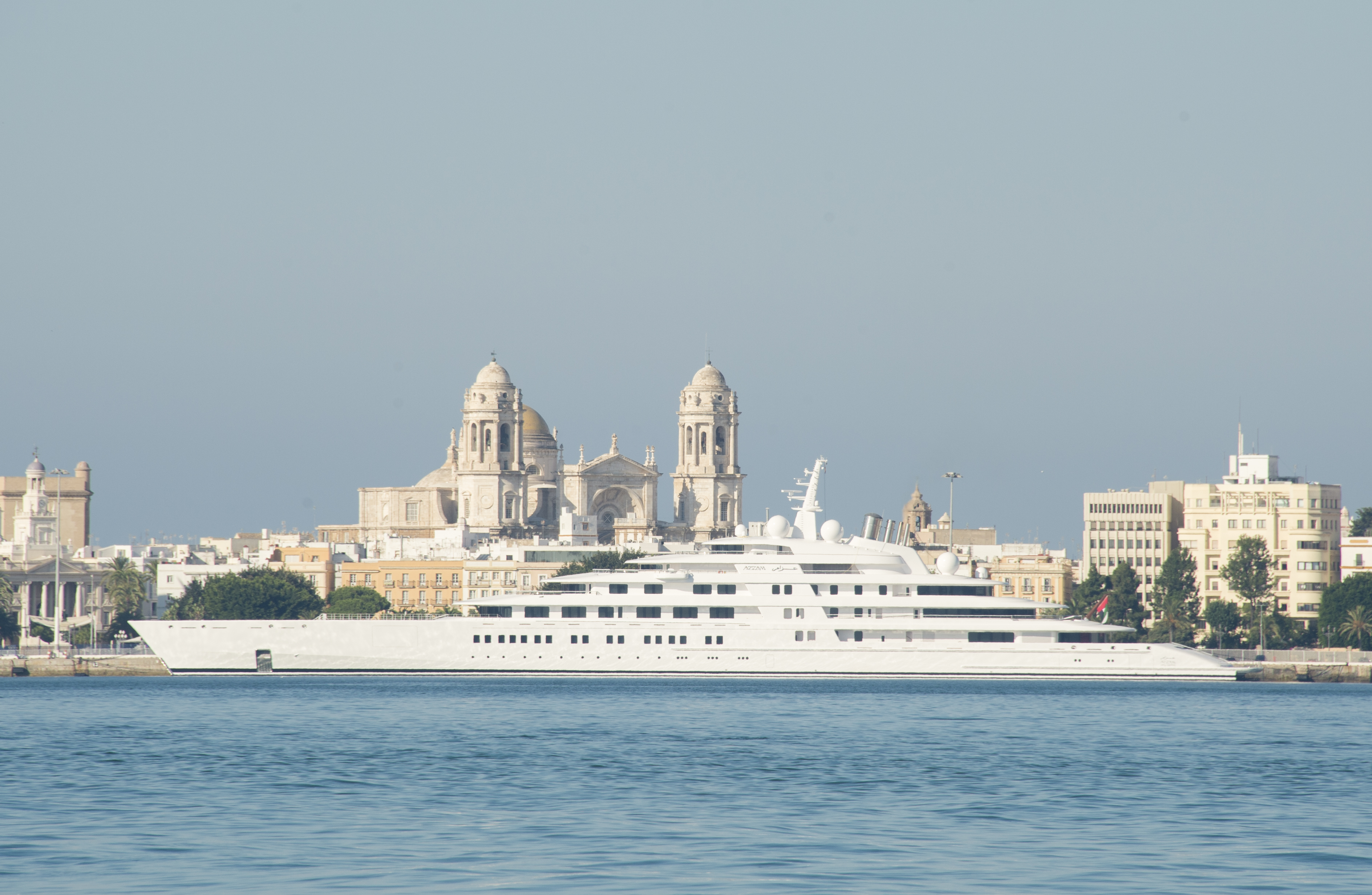
- Azzam docked at the port of Cádiz, Spain (2020)

History

Abu Dhabi
- Name: Azzam
- Owner: Sheikh Khalifa bin Zayed Al Nahyan (until 2022)
- Builder: Lürssen Yachts
- Cost: US$600 million
- Launched: 5 April 2013
- In service: 2013
- Identification: IMO number: 9693367; MMSI number: 470992000; Callsign: A6KZ
- Status: Active

General characteristics
- Type: Super yacht
- Tonnage: 13,136 GT
- Length: 180 m (590 ft)
- Beam: 20.8 m (68 ft)
- Draft: 4.3 m (14 ft 1 in)
- Propulsion: 2 diesel 17,524 kW (23,500 hp); 2 gas turbine 17,524 kW (23,500 hp)
- Speed: 32 knots (59 km/h; 37 mph)
- Boats & landing craft carried: 1 mini-submarine

Azzam (Arabic: عزام, literally "Resolute") is a private superyacht built by German shipyard Lürssen Yachts. Azzam was launched on 5 April 2013. At 180 metres (590 ft) in length, it is the longest private motor yacht in the world. It has a beam of 20.8 metres (68 ft) and an unusually shallow draft of 4.3 m (14 ft 1 in). The yacht was delivered on 9 September 2013.

== Engineering ==
Mubarak Saad al Ahbabi directed the construction of Azzam, with technical engineering by Lürssen Yachts, design by Nauta Yachts, and interior design by Christophe Leoni. Following a year of engineering, the yacht was built in only three years, a record for a ship of this size. Azzam can travel at high speed in shallow waters.

== Features ==
Its main salon is 29 m (95 ft) long, it has a beam of 18 m (59 ft), an open plan, and no pillars. Its top speed is over 32 knots (59 km/h; 37 mph), powered by a combination of two gas turbines and two diesel engines with a total power output of 35,048 kW (47,000 hp) through four pump-jets. Two of the pump-jets are nonmovable round water outlets in the middle of the stern, while the other two feature movable duct water outlets that provide thrust vectoring capabilities.

At an estimated cost of $605 million, the ship cost approximately $100 million more than the third-largest private motor yacht, Eclipse.

== Ownership and use ==
Azzam was commissioned by Khalifa bin Zayed Al Nahyan, president of the United Arab Emirates (until his death in 2022). The yacht is listed for charter without a price. However, according to Motor Boat & Yacht magazine, it is not available for charter; the charter listing, similar to Roman Abramovich's Eclipse, is aimed to avoid European taxation, as charter yachts are exempt from property tax.
