= Al Said (yacht) =

Yacht owned by the Sultan of Oman

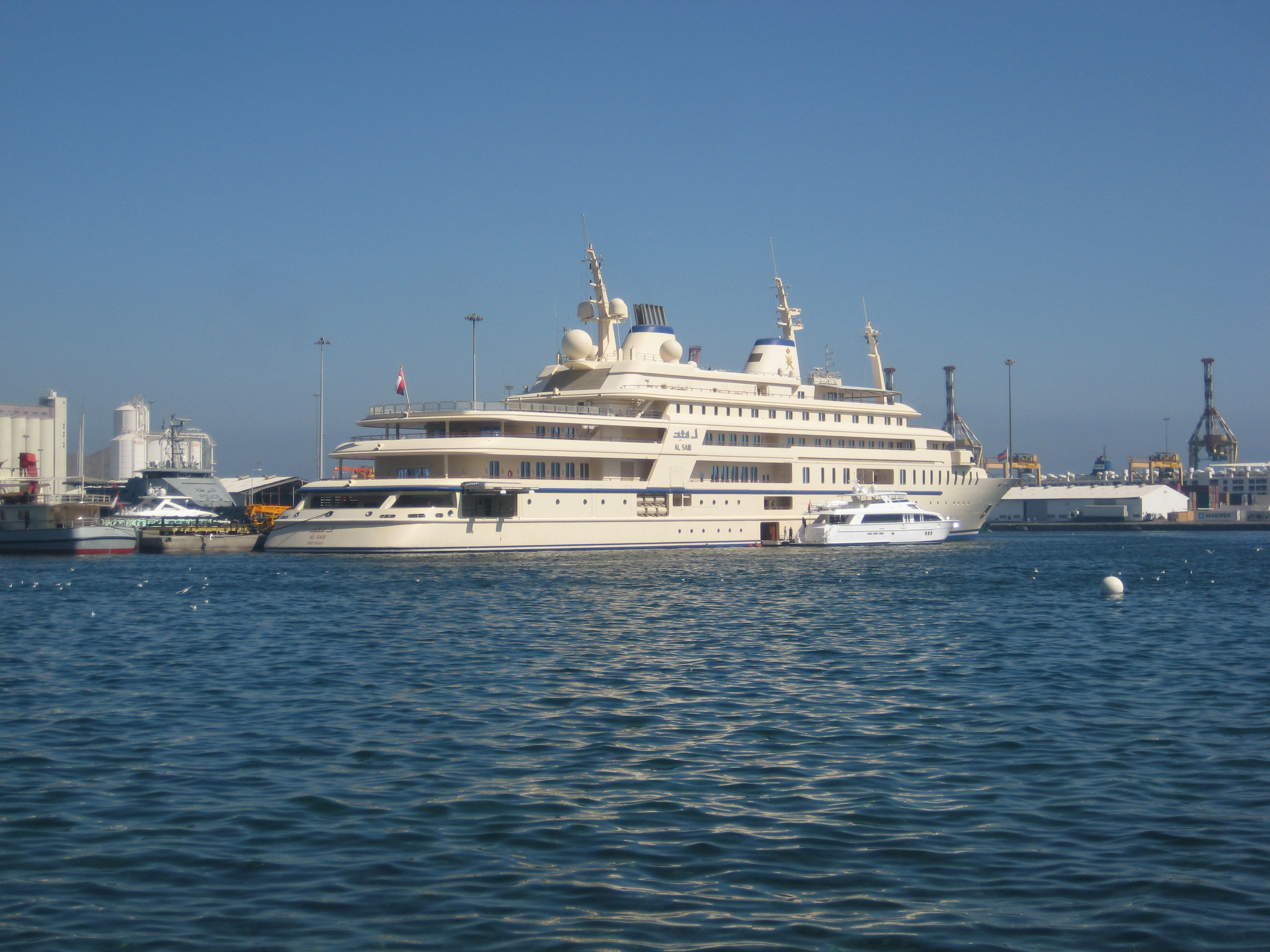
- Al-Said docked at Muttrah Harbor, Muscat

History

Oman
- Name: Al Said
- Operator: Sultan of Oman
- Ordered: 2006
- Builder: Lürssen
- Launched: 10 September 2007
- Notes: Call sign: A4DE; IMO number: 9463774; MMSI number: 461001000

General characteristics
- Class & type: Yacht
- Tonnage: 15,850 GT
- Length: 155.00 m (508.53 ft)
- Beam: 24.00 m (78.74 ft)
- Draft: 5.20 m (17.1 ft)
- Propulsion: Diesel 16,500kW (21,992hp)
- Speed: 25.2 knots (47 km/h) (maximum); 14.5 knots (27 km/h) (cruising)

Al Said is a luxury yacht owned by the Sultan of Oman. The yacht was ordered to be made in 2006, by Lürssen. The ship was code named Project Sunflower during its construction. Al Said was launched by the Lürssen Shipyard in September 2007 and at the time of her launch she was the world's second longest yacht. The yacht was completed in the following months and delivered to her owners in 2008.

== See also ==
- Oman Royal Yacht Squadron
- List of motor yachts by length
