= Superyacht =

Large and luxurious pleasure vessel

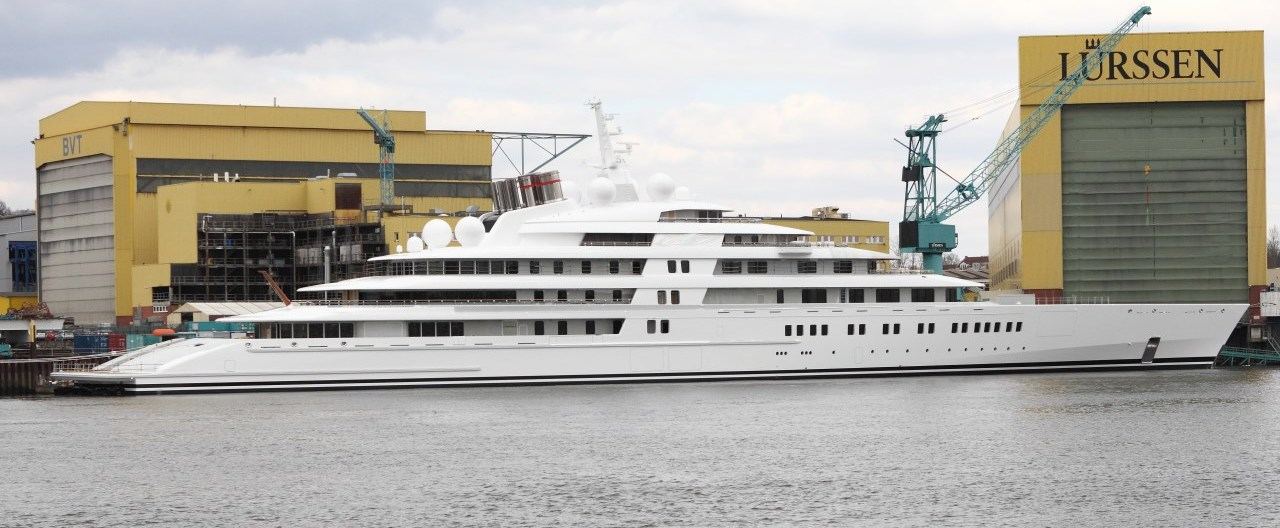
Azzam, at 180.6 metres (592.5 ft) the longest superyacht as of 2020

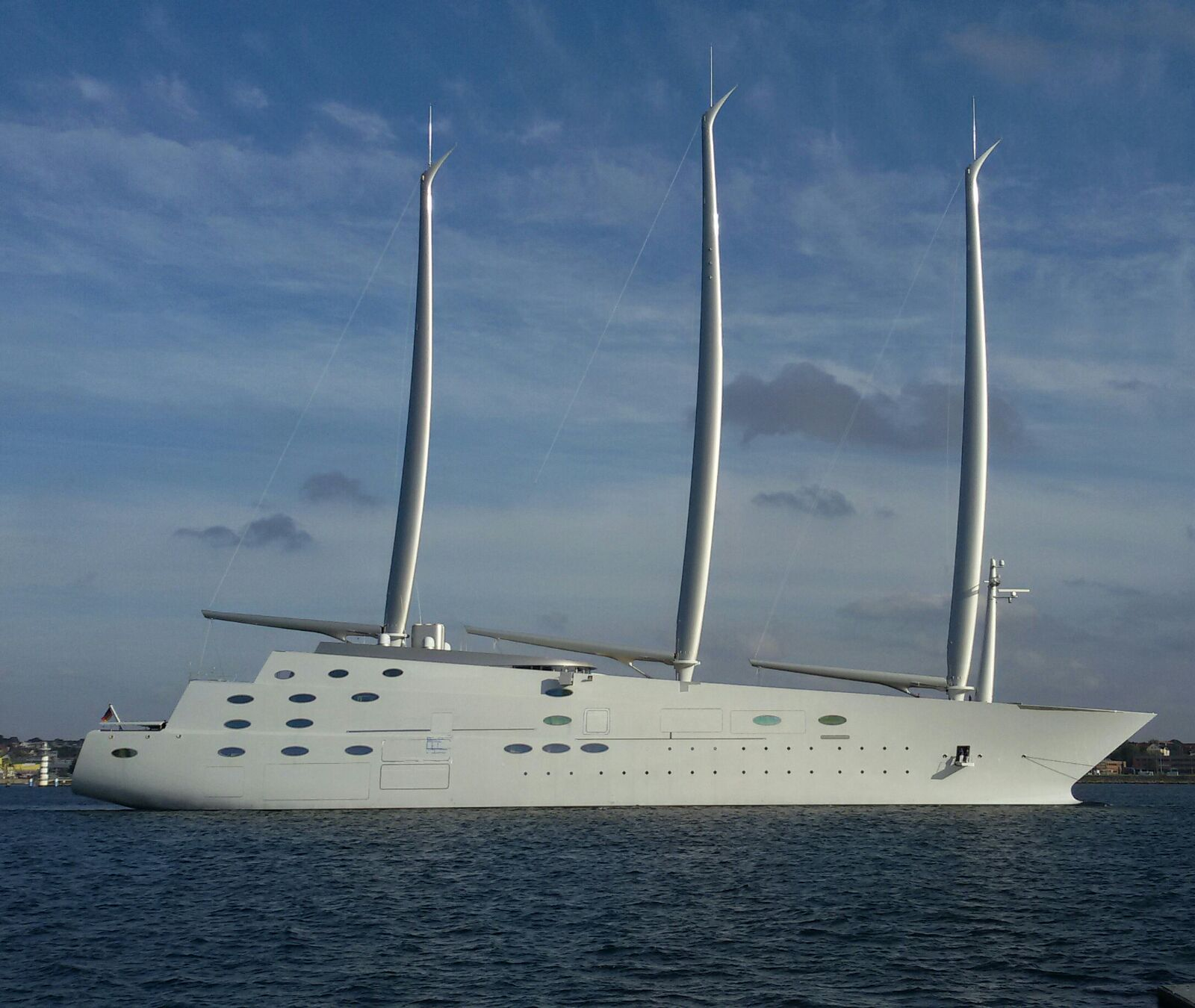
A, at 142.8 metres (468.5 ft) the largest "sail-assisted" motor yacht as of 2018

A superyacht or megayacht is a large and luxurious pleasure vessel. There are no official or agreed upon definitions for such yachts, but these terms are regularly used to describe professionally crewed motor or sailing yachts, ranging from 40 metres (130 ft) to more than 180 metres (590 ft) in length, and sometimes include yachts as small as 24 metres (79 ft).

Superyachts are often available for charter with a staff that caters to guests at a high standard of comfort. They may be designed to emphasize comfort, speed, or expedition capability. Depending on the season, superyachts may be most frequently found in the Mediterranean or the Caribbean. Many are available for charter; prices may far exceed €100,000 per week. Larger examples may have more than one swimming pool; they may carry a variety of water toys, other boats, and some have helipads to receive guests from helicopters.

Characterized as symbols "of great wealth and excessive consumption", superyachts have been criticized for the harm they do to the environment. According to one estimate, a superyacht is the single most polluting object a person can own, more so than a private jet aircraft. A superyacht large enough for a helicopter pad, submarine and a permanent crew emits 1,500 times more carbon in a year than a typical family car.

== History ==
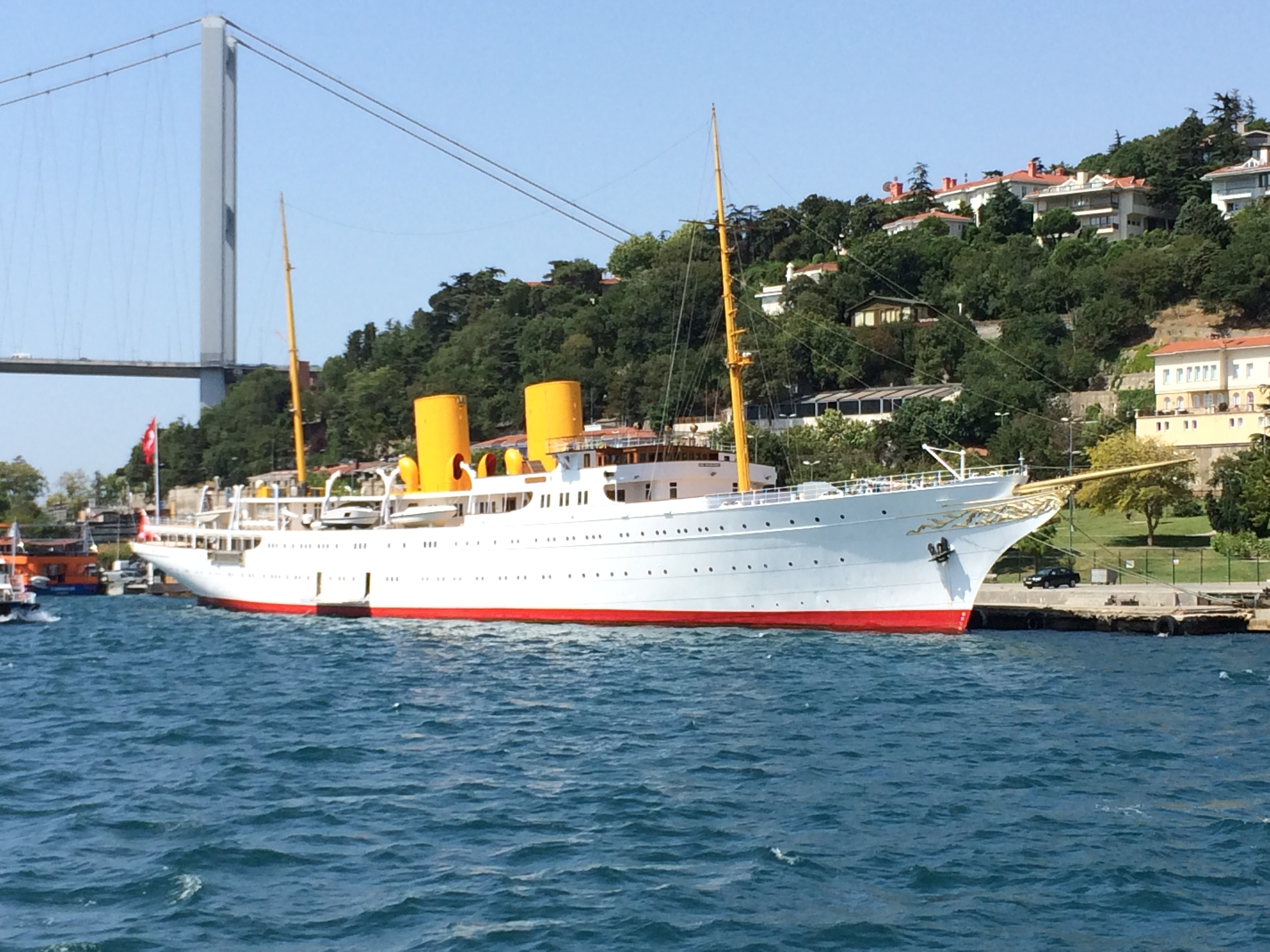
Built in 1931, the Savarona (136 metres (446 ft)) was the 20th-largest yacht as of 2018

At the beginning of the 20th century, when wealthy men ordered large private yachts for personal use, some manufacturers, such as Cox & King and Charles L. Seabury and Company, were noted for their large steam yachts. The first half of the 20th century saw the first large motor yachts, including Charles Henry Fletcher's Jemima F. III (1908) at 34 metres (111 ft), Savarona (1931) at 136 metres (446 ft), and Christina O (1947 conversion) at 99 metres (325 ft).

== Overview ==
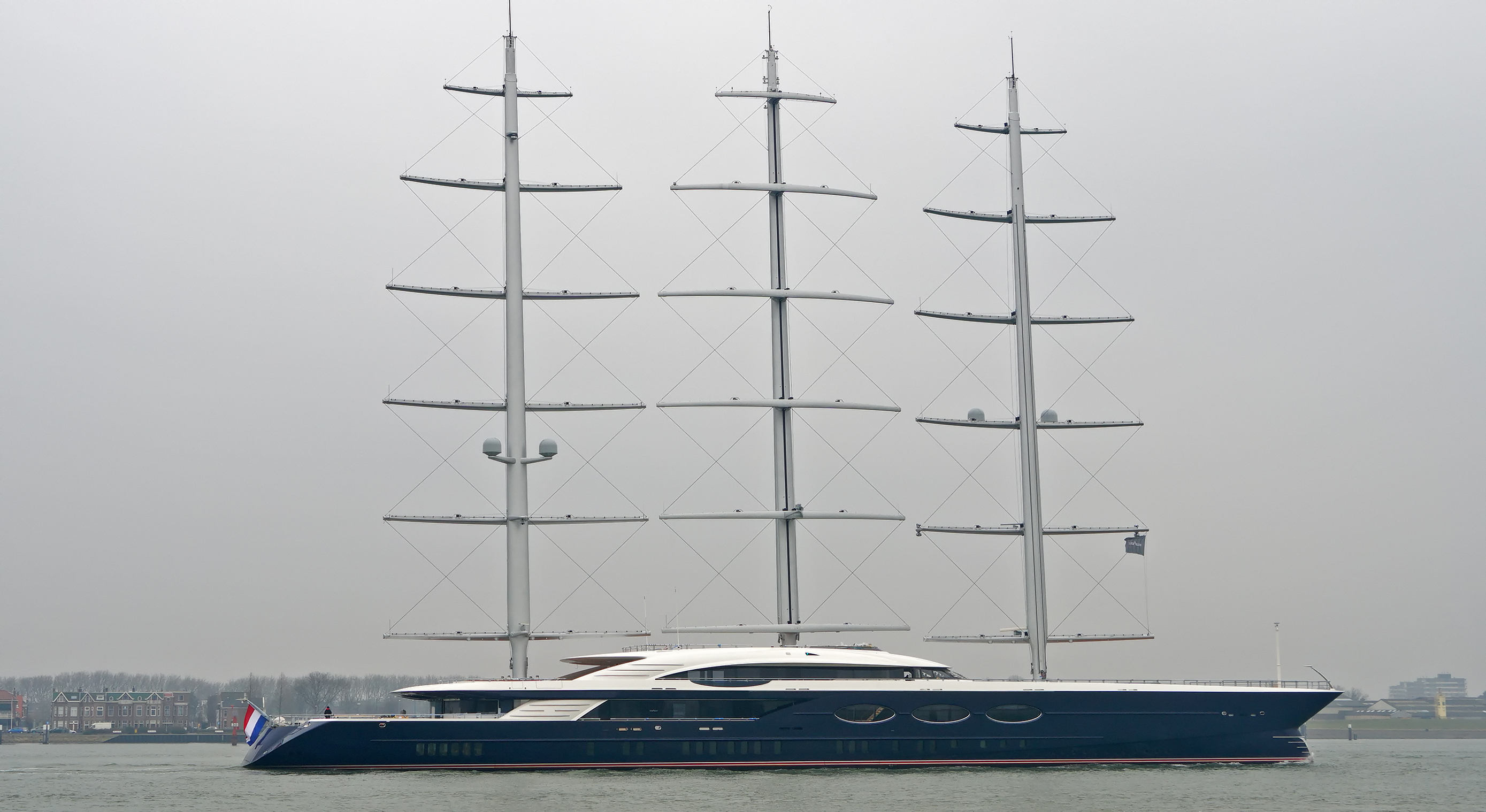
Black Pearl, at 106.7 metres (350.1 ft) the largest sailing yacht as of 2018

The "Large Commercial Yacht Code (LY2)" of the United Kingdom and its relevant overseas territories defines a "large yacht" as one that is 24 metres (79 ft) or more at the waterline and is in commercial use for sport or pleasure, while not carrying cargo or more than 12 passengers, and carrying a professional crew. The code regulates the equipping of such vessels, both at sea and in port—including such matters as crew duty times and the presence of a helicopter on board. The code has different levels of standard for vessels above and below 500 gross tons. Other countries have standards similar to LY2. Whereas yachts of 24 metres and below may be constructed of fiberglass, larger yachts are more likely to be constructed of steel, aluminum or composite fiber-reinforced plastic. Such yachts may be considered "superyachts" and are more commonly at 40 metres (130 ft) or more in length.

Whereas "commercial" large yachts may carry no more than 12 passengers, "private" yachts are solely for the pleasure of the owner and guests do not carry the passenger restriction. Yachts may be identified by flag—the country under which a yacht is registered. An industry publication categorizes superyachts by size, by speed, as "explorer" yachts, as sailing yachts, and classic yachts.

As of 2016, there were about 10,000 superyachts over 24 metres in length, worldwide. Of these about 80% were power yachts. The annual production rate was reported to be around 150. As of 2018, the 200 largest yachts ranged in length from 70 metres (230 ft) to 181 metres (594 ft)—the Azzam. The largest yacht by displacement was the 20,361 gross ton Fulk Al Salamah. At 143 metres (469 ft), the largest sail-assisted motor yacht was Sailing Yacht A. As of 2018, the top 50 sailing yachts ranged in size from 53 metres (174 ft) to 107 metres (351 ft)—the Black Pearl. The 20 fastest superyachts ranged in speed from 50 knots (93 km/h) with 7,290-horsepower (5.44 MW) engines to 67 knots (124 km/h) with 20,600-horsepower (15.4 MW) engines for the motor yacht, World is not Enough. In 2022 1,024 new superyachts were built or on order around the world, and 1,203 in 2023. Half of them are built in Italy.

As superyachts have increased in size, so have the informal terms that describe their size evolved to include "megayacht", "gigayacht" and (speculatively) "terayacht".

== Businesses ==
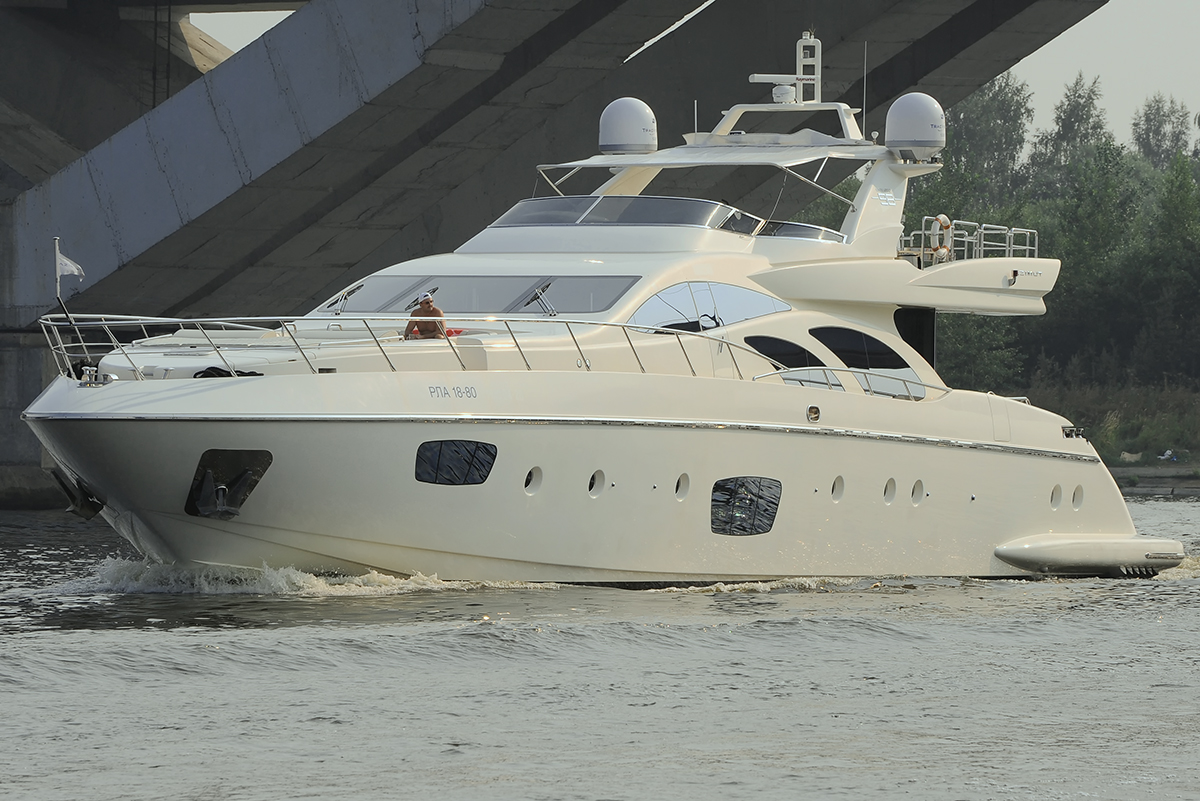
By 2019, Azimut and its Benetti subsidiary had made more than 800 superyachts

Between 1998 and 2008, European production of superyachts grew by 228%, ending the period with a total production of 916 units and $10 billion in orders. In January 2020, Boat International listed 4,621 professionals connected to the superyacht industry since 1856, including 1,806 builders.

Superyacht builders and yacht charter companies are predominantly based in Western Europe and the United States but are also found in Australia, New Zealand, Asia, and Eastern Europe.

== Distribution ==
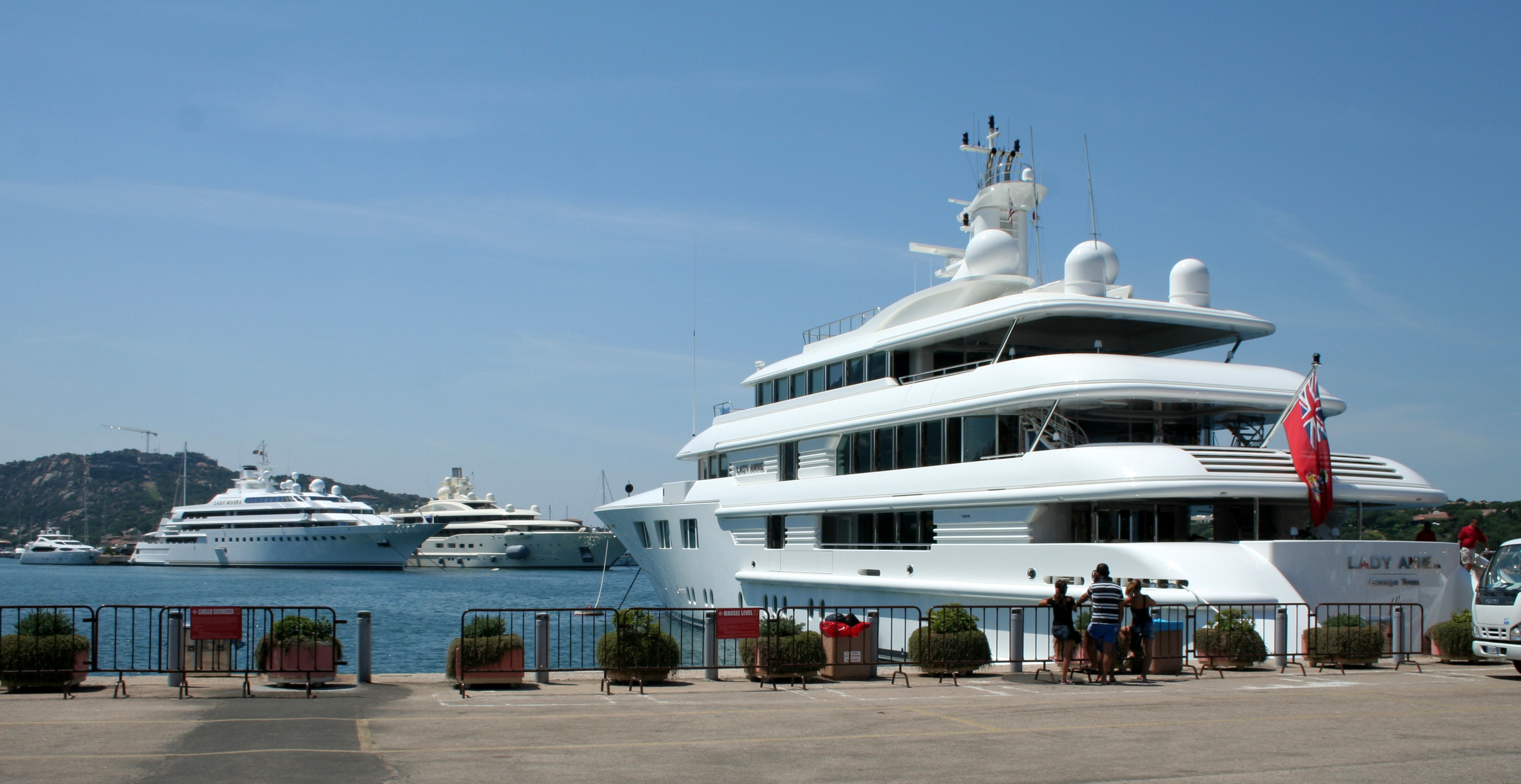
Superyachts at the port of Porto Cervo, Sardinia

Each superyacht has a flag state where it is registered, but may have never visited. Common flag state registrars for large yachts are Cayman Islands, Marshall Islands, Isle of Man, and the British Virgin Islands, among others.

Superyachts typically frequent the Mediterranean Sea in summer and the Caribbean Sea in winter. Typical destinations in Spain and the French and Italian Rivieras include Cannes, Antibes, St. Tropez, Monte Carlo, Portofino, Porto Cervo, Puerto Banús, Puerto Portals, and Palma, Mallorca; explorer superyachts may cruise in remote areas worldwide.

== Charter ==
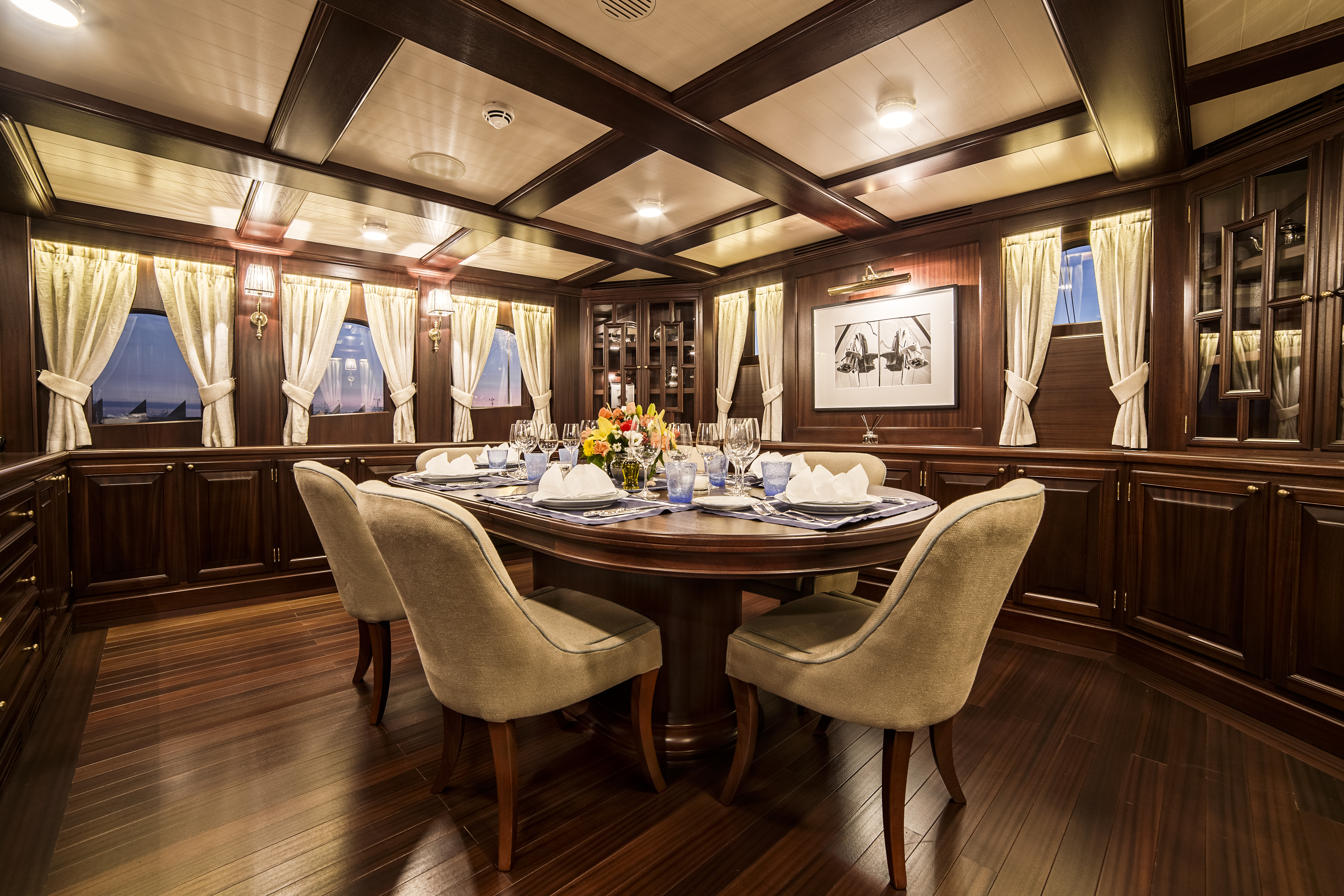
Dining salon of yacht Taransay in 2015

Some yachts are used exclusively by their private owners, others are operated all year round as yacht charter businesses, and a large number are privately owned but available for charter part-time. As of 2018, superyacht charter costs were €70–550 thousand per week. Charter contracts usually include an advance provisioning allowance—a deposit to cover such operating expenses as food, fuel, and berthing. The unspent balance of the allowance is returned to the customer at the end of the charter.

The luxury yacht charter industry functions effectively because private yacht owners mitigate their running costs with charter income as well as keeping their yachts and crew in top running order. Conversely, private charterers charter yachts (rather than owning them) because it is generally considered to be less expensive, and less hassle, than owning a yacht and it also provides them with extra choice related to yacht type, location and crew. The vessels may do short cruises with the owners and/or guests aboard. Antigua is one of the main ports in the Windward Islands of the Caribbean and hosts a Charter Show at the beginning of the winter season.

=== Tax Implications ===
The ownership of a yacht and whether its private or public can have major tax implications. Residency-based taxation that is used throughout Europe incentives people to stay stateless or register their yachts in tax-friendly countries. The Paradise Papers highlighted how wealthy owners have gotten around value added taxes.For example, Yacht Engaged in Trade registration (YET) offered by France, Monaco, Marshall Islands, and Cayman Islands eliminates the need to register a yacht privately or commercially. Therefore, owners of these yachts avoid European VAT taxes altogether.

== Design and layout ==
The size and types of accommodations, amenities and number of water toys increases with boat size.

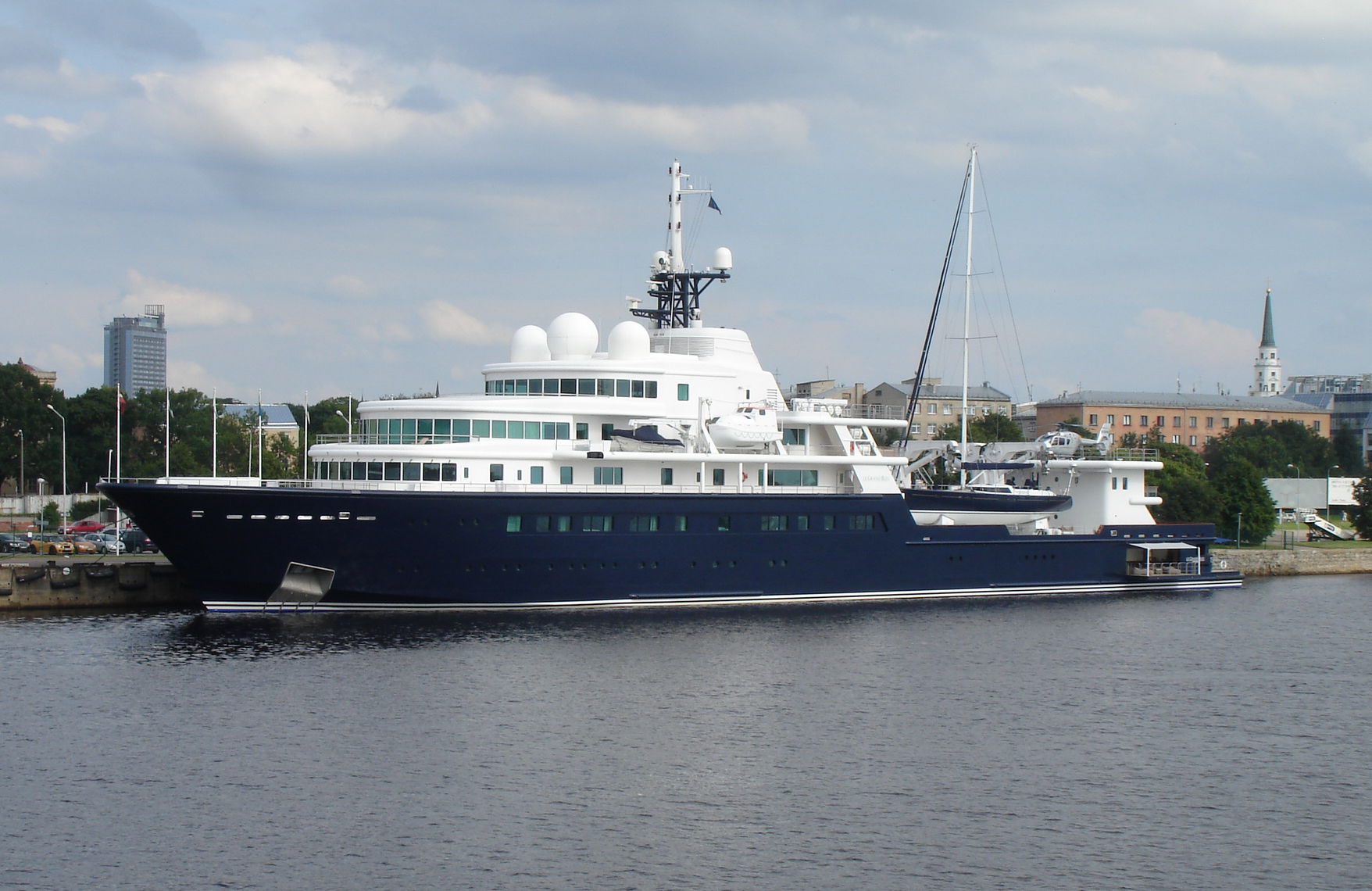
Le Grand Bleu carries a sailboat, a power boat and a helicopter on her afterdecks

=== 40 metres ===
A 40-metre (130 ft) superyacht may have cabins for 10–12 guests and for a crew of a similar size. This type of yacht may be configured, as follows:

- Lower deck: exterior swimming platform at the stern; four (sometimes five) guest cabins with en-suite bath aft; engine room amidships; crew quarters forward.
- Main deck: sheltered exterior deck aft leading into the saloon; dining room and galley; entrance amidships; owner's suite forward, usually includes a study, and sometimes a second stateroom for a personal assistant/bodyguard.
- Upper deck: exterior deck aft, often used for outdoor dining; second saloon (often called the sky lounge); sixth stateroom will be amidships if it is not on the lower deck or part of the owner's suite; captain's cabin; bridge.
- Sun deck: the uppermost deck, often features a hot tub and sometimes a glass-enclosed gym (which can also be below decks or even part of the owner's suite).

=== 50 metres ===
A 50-metre (160 ft) yacht may have one or more yacht tenders for reaching shore and other water toys which may include a speed boat or sailing boat, personal water craft, windsurfing and diving equipment and a banana boat. Such yachts have multiple screen displays and satellite communications.

=== 60 metres ===
Yachts above 60 metres (200 ft) are typically built to individual specifications, cost tens of millions of dollars, and typically have four decks above the waterline and one or two below. There is likely to be a helicopter landing platform. Apart from additional guest cabins, which are likely to include one or more "VIP suites" besides the owner's suite, such a yacht will have some or all of the following amenities: indoor hot tubs, sauna and steam rooms, a beauty salon, massage and other treatment rooms, a medical centre, a disco (usually the same space as the sky lounge or saloon, transformed into a dance area when furnishings are moved aside and special lighting activated), a cinema, plunge pool (possibly with a wave-maker), a playroom, and additional living areas such as a separate bar, secondary dining room, private sitting rooms or a library.

=== Support vessel ===
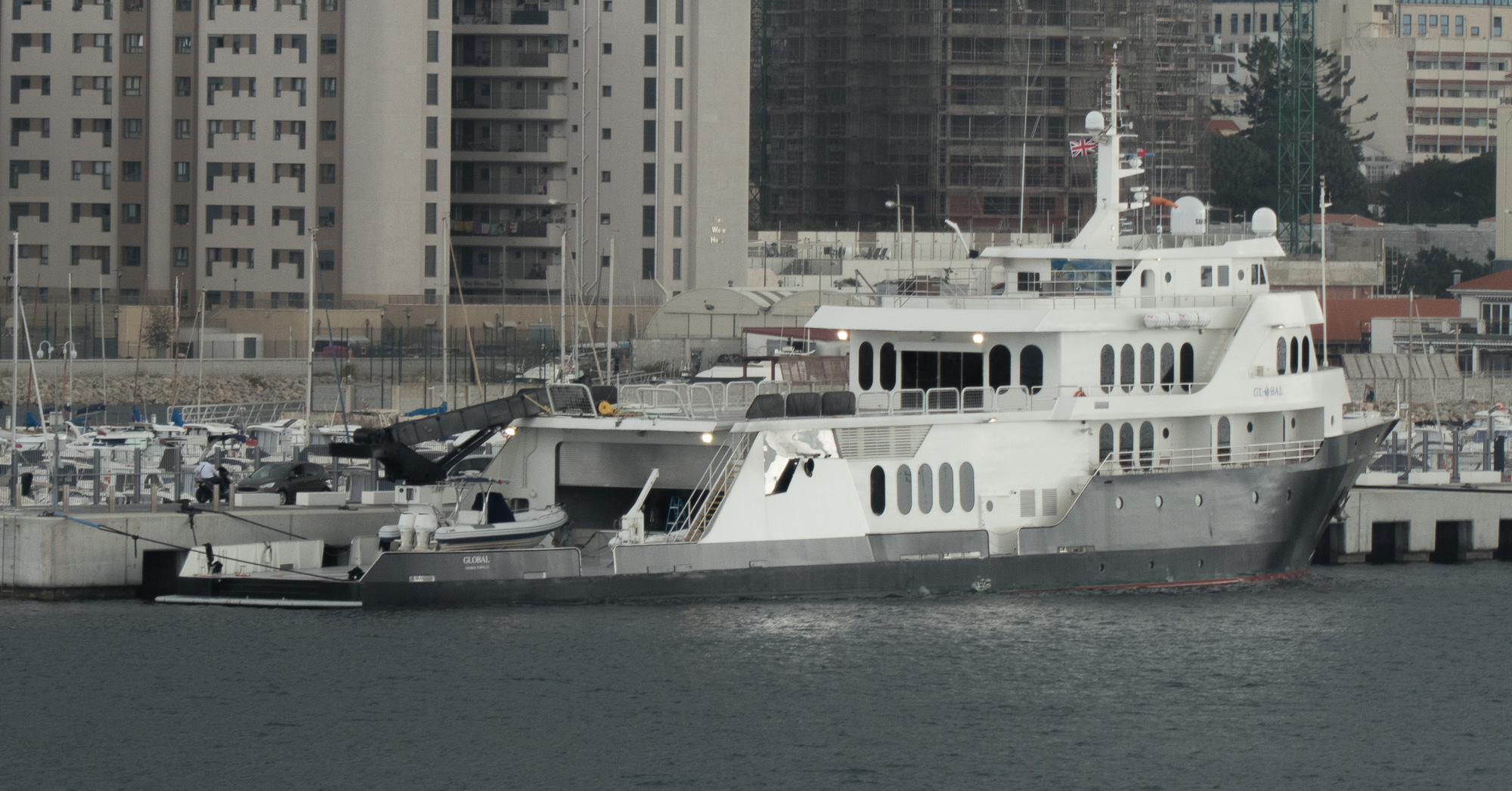
A superyacht support vessel carries bulky items, including watercraft or a helicopter

Superyachts may be accompanied by a support (or shadow) vessel that carries such items as watercraft, helicopters or other large items that the yacht itself cannot readily accommodate. Such vessels range in length from 20 to 100 metres (66 to 328 ft). There are at least four manufacturers that specialize in building such vessels. One 67-metre (220 ft) example included the following amenities: a helicopter deck, six guest rooms, two-story helicopter hangar with sound system, movie theater, freshwater pool, a landing craft, four each of: jet skis, kayaks, sailboats, diving and fishing gear, and water skis. For use ashore, there were reportedly a two-seater automobile, two motor scooters and two bicycles. The vessel also featured a 35-tonne (35,000 kg) crane.

== Crew ==
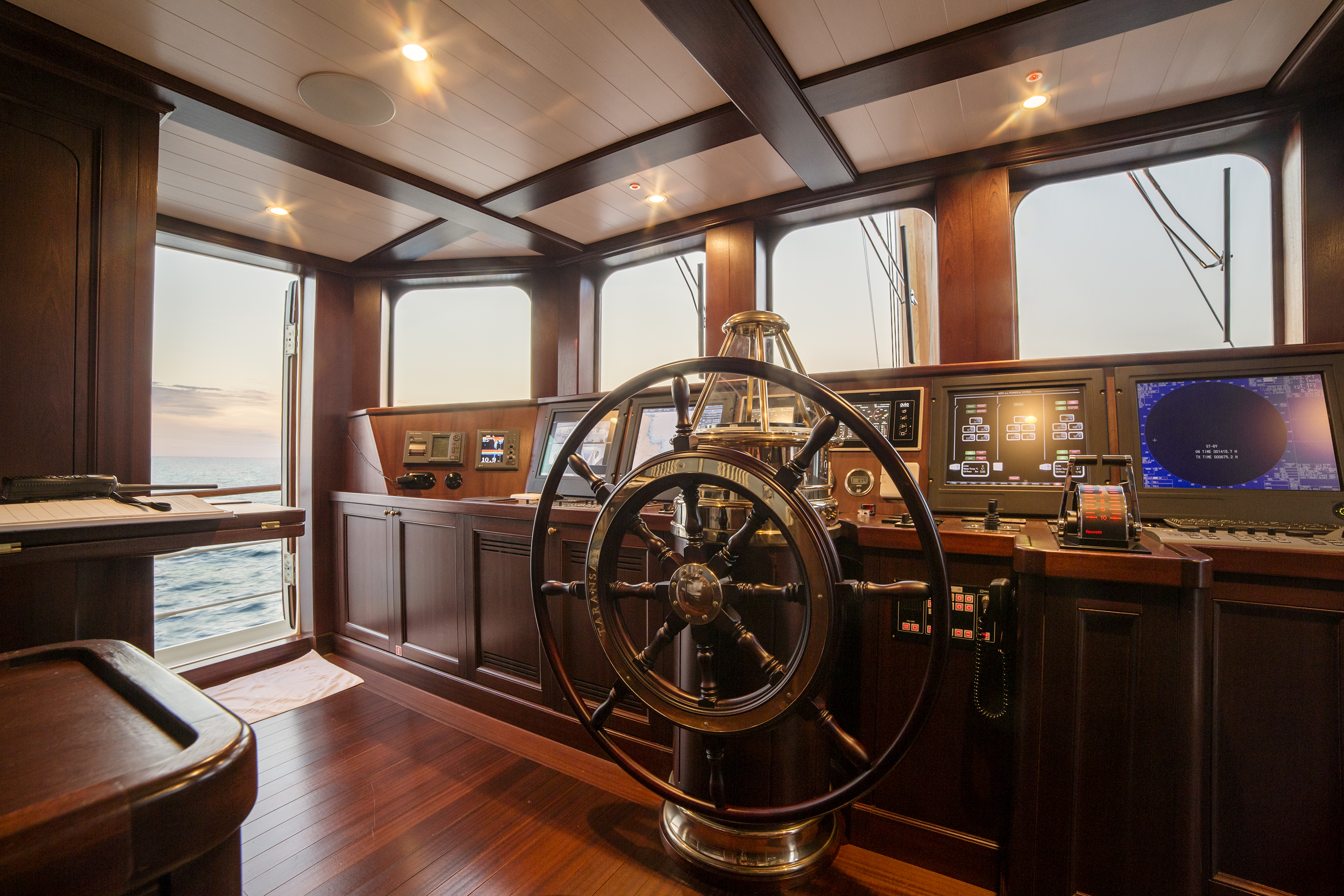
Wheelhouse of yacht Taransay in 2015 with navigation and systems displays

The crew of a superyacht comprises five elements, each with its own staff: the captain, who has overall responsibility for the yacht; the chef, who is responsible for the cuisine; the interior staff, who create a hotel-like environment; the deck crew, which operates and maintains the vessel; and the engineers, who ensure the proper functioning of the vessel's many systems. A superyacht may be maintained by its crew, which may be reduced in size during the periods that the owners are not on board and no charters are booked. Most crew members live on board and are paid a monthly salary, with most living expenses covered by the owner. Live-on-board crews do not pay rent, food, electricity or water bills.

All superyachts have crew areas below deck, which consist of a crew mess, crew cabins and laundry. While most crew cabins contain bunk beds, there are captains and chief engineers who, on the larger yachts, have their own cabins. There are no set hours that crew members work each week. The hours depend greatly on how often the owners are on board, how often it is chartered and on what hours the captain sets when there are no guests on board. Crew members may be hired through crew agencies or various websites.

== See also ==
- List of large sailing yachts
- List of motor yachts by length
- List of sailboat designers and manufacturers
