= ROCK.IT (yacht) =

Dutch superyacht

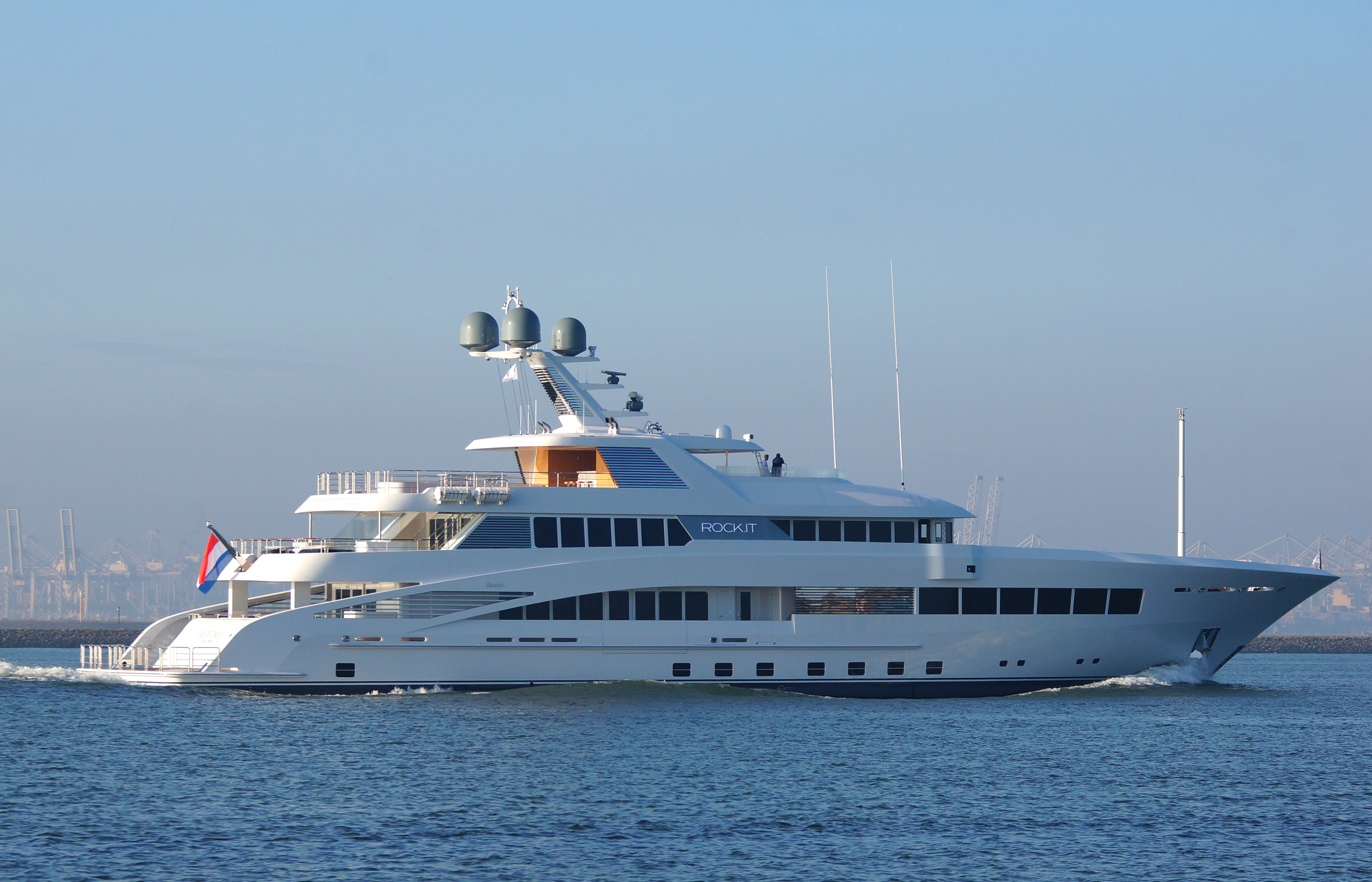

History

Cayman Islands
- Name: ROCK.IT
- Builder: Feadship
- Yard number: 687
- Launched: 2014
- Completed: 2014
- In service: 2015
- Identification: IMO number: 1012347; MMSI number: 319072900; Callsign: ZGEJ6

General characteristics
- Class & type: Motor yacht
- Tonnage: 1,052 GT
- Length: 60.35 m (198 ft 0 in)
- Beam: 10.8 m (35 ft 5 in)
- Draught: 3.3 m (10 ft 10 in)
- Propulsion: 2 x MTU 12V 4000 M53R; 2 x 1.140 kW (1.529 hp)
- Capacity: 10 persons
- Crew: 13

ROCK.IT is a 60.35 m (198 ft 0 in) superyacht launched at the Feadship yard in Aalsmeer. The yacht was designed by Dutch design company Sinot Exclusive Yacht Design, which also worked with Feadship on the 88 m (289 ft) twins Musashi and Fountainhead. The yacht is currently owned by The Yacht Company based in Monaco. The yacht was previously owned by Jimmy John Liautaud, who was involved in the design process. Liautaud sold the yacht in June 2023. As of 2024, the yacht was available on Charterworld for paid charters.

== Design and description ==
ROCK.IT has a length of 60.35 m (198 ft 0 in), a 10.8 m (35 ft 5 in) beam, and a draught of 3.3 m (11 ft). The hull is built out of steel while the material of the superstructure is made out of aluminium with teak laid decks. The yacht is Lloyd's registered, issued by Cayman Islands.

ROCK.IT is powered by twin MTU 12V 4000 M53R diesel engines, giving her a combined power of 2,280 kW (3,060 hp). She has a fuel capacity of 120,000 liters (26,000 imp gal; 32,000 U.S. gal), a water capacity of 24,000 L (5,300 imp gal; 6,300 US gal), and a range of 5,300 nautical miles (9,800 km; 6,100 mi) at 12 knots (22 km/h; 14 mph). She also features at-anchor stabilizers.

ROCK.IT can accommodate up to ten guests with four guest staterooms plus the owner’s stateroom. There are six crew cabins that accommodate thirteen crew members. The lower deck houses storage rooms, laundry, the galley and the crew mess.

The yacht has three bars and a variety of dining options. ROCK.IT also has multiple outdoor lounges, including a sun deck with seating and a Jacuzzi flanked by sun pads.

== Usage ==
ROCK.IT logged over 17,000 nmi (31,000 km; 20,000 mi) in the first nine months after delivery, and almost 40,000 nmi (74,000 km; 46,000 mi) as of September 2017. ROCK.IT sailed to destinations in the Americas including Bermuda, the Keys, Panama, Costa Rica, Mexico, Montauk, Galápagos, and others. ROCK.IT hosted a number of famous guests, including Kid Rock.

== Awards and recognition ==
ROCK.IT was a finalist in the World Superyacht Awards 2015, Displacement Motor Yachts of 500GT to 1,299GT category, as well as in the Showboat Design Awards 2016, Interior Design Award – Motor Yacht over 500GT and Naval Architecture Award – Displacement Motor Yacht categories.

ROCK.IT was featured in a number of publications, including Boat International, Show Boats International, and The Superyacht Report.

== July 2024 ==
On July 28, 2024, people aboard ROCK.IT attempted to hold a private party on a protected beach of Talmone in Palau, Sardinia, Italy. The ship's crew set up gazebos, a beach volleyball net, a DJ set, and lit fires. The Harbour Office intervened to order the beach to be cleared.

== See also ==
- List of motor yachts by length
- List of yachts built by Feadship
