= Wedge Too =

Dutch yacht

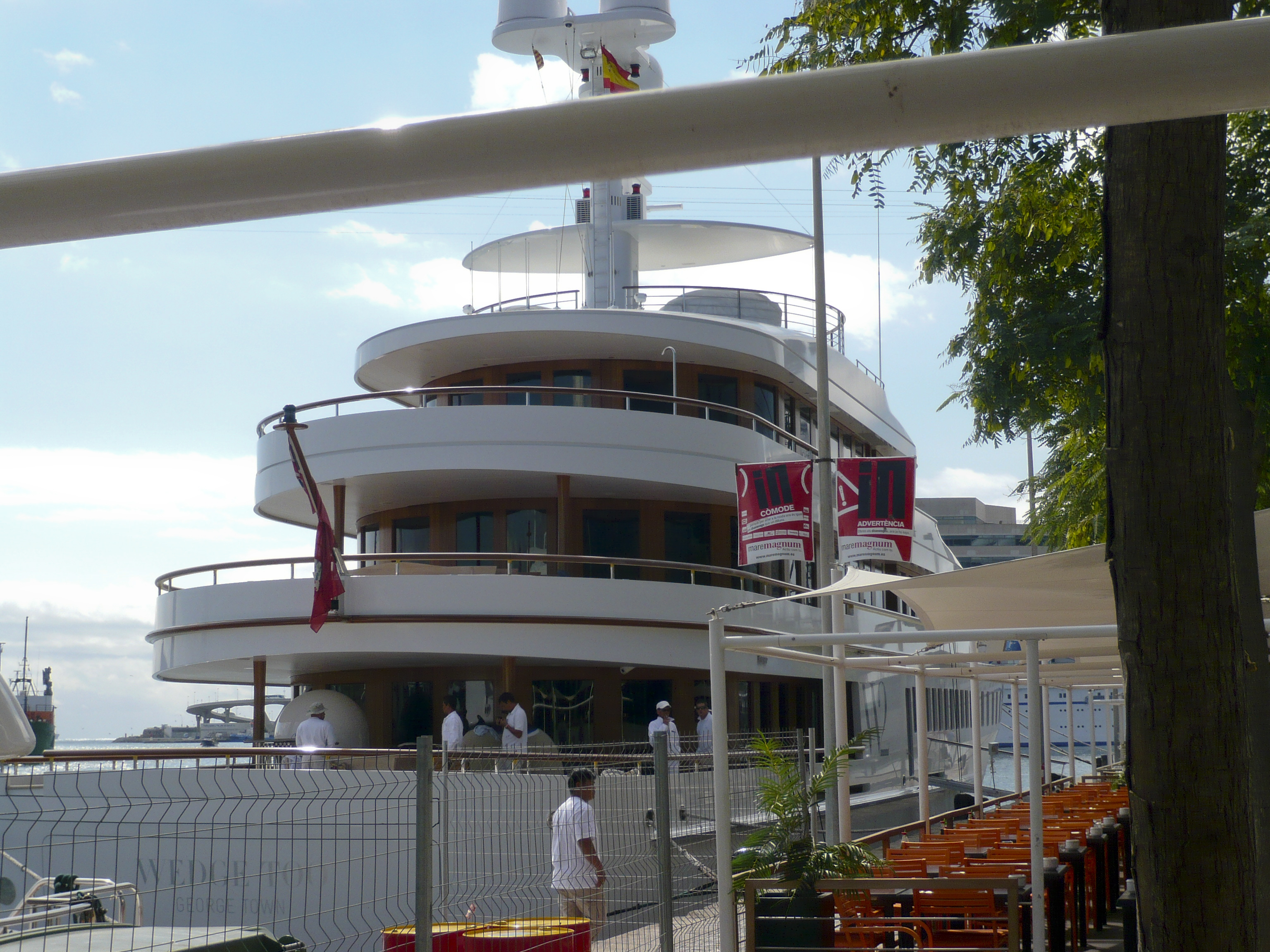

History

Cayman Islands
- Name: Wedge Too
- Owner: Issam Fares
- Builder: Feadship
- Yard number: 664
- Launched: 2002
- In service: 2002
- Identification: IMO number: 8989862; MMSI number: 319861000; Callsign: ZCII

General characteristics
- Class & type: Motor yacht
- Tonnage: 1300 gross tons
- Length: 65 m (213 ft)
- Beam: 11.30 m (37.1 ft)
- Draught: 3.35 m (11.0 ft)
- Propulsion: Twin 1,581hp Caterpillar 3512B DITA engines
- Speed: 15 knots (28 km/h) (cruise); 16 knots (30 km/h) (max)
- Capacity: 12 guests
- Crew: 18

The 65 m (213 ft) superyacht Wedge Too was launched by Feadship in 2002. French designer Philippe Starck designed both the interior and exterior of Wedge Too.

== Design ==
Wedge Too features a 65 m (213 ft) by 11.30 m (37.1 ft) displacement steel hull with a draught of 3.35 m (11.0 ft) and aluminium superstructure, with teak decks and was built to ABS A1 Yachting Service, AMS classification society rules. Wedge Too is registered in the Cayman Islands.

== Engines ==
Propulsion is supplied by twin 1,581 hp Caterpillar 3512B DITA engines.

== See also ==
- List of motor yachts by length
- List of yachts built by Feadship
