= List of yachts built by Feadship =

This is a list of all the yachts built by Feadship, sorted by year.

Was the longest yacht upon completion.

== 1920–1955 ==
Year	Length overall in meters	Name
1920	14	Super
1931	11.80	Refuge
1934	10.20	Stern
1934	13.60	Raram
1935	14.5	Ramsar
1936	9	De Noorman
1937	9.14	KPM
1938	26	Tirrena
1938	13.24	Schollevaer
1938	14	Corabia II
1939	29	Sultan
1939	30	Iduna
1939	15	Zephyr
1948	13	Ibis
1948	11	Waterlelie
1950	20	Rotterdam
1951	6.70	Pampus; Build #503 (Hull #3)
1952	19.56	Bramar; Build #506 Name in USA Zuiderwind
1952	19	Rubato; Build #507 Name later in France Boulinier
1952	13.35	Jo-Ed; Build #514 Wooden sportfisherman
1952	13.35	Linda Anne; Build #513
1952	17.07	Brigand (Hull #7)
1953	25.30	Serano II Hull ID#502359 renamed Exuberance, Notorious
1953	16.76	Capri build #517 Renamed Alisand III
1953	22.86	Ventura
1953	29.57	Olga II
1954	18.29	Roberta (Hull #35) renamed Zeegodin
1954	12	Dutch Treat
1955	11	Goodwin
1955	18.40	Calypso
1955	19.81	Gladys II
1955	16.76	Gerelbo II

== 1956–1965 ==
Year	Length overall in meters	Name
1956	27.43	Champbell
1956	20.33	Ola (renamed Flame)
1956	19.84	DSV (renamed 50/50)
1956	17.30	De zwerver
1957	24.4 m (plus 8 ft bowsprit)	De Vrouwe Christina
1957	25	Sirocco (renamed Atalanta)
1958	14	Beatrix
1959	11	Trio
1959	19	Oceanus II
1960	20	Aljazi
1960	18.60	Ancor
1960	9.25	Tradewinds
1960	13.75	Carola
1960	35.05	Camargo IV
1961	10.30	Maracas Bay
1961	18	Tiky
1961	20	Sylvia
1962	14	Tasna
1963	26.78	Atlantic
1963	32.85	Ocepa
1963	32.90	Santa Maria
1964	17.1	Samsoon
1964	22.5	El Galgo II
1964	26.35	Exact
1964	26.35	Sea Harmony
1964	28.10	Najade
1965	22.5	Caravelle
1965	16.5	Marielaur

== 1966–1975 ==
Year	Length overall in meters	Name
1966	16.85	Katja
1966	25.80	Sirocco
1966	44.80	Westlake (renamed Antarctica)
1967	32.74	Karimor V
1967	17.80	Sirena
1967	26.82	Tartar
1968	22.30	Ute
1968	24.5	Ale II
1968	17.26	Mi-Do II
1969	30.10	Prosit
1969	25.80	Monara (ex Olympia)
1969	25.80	Din-Dina
1970	33	Pakeha
1970	36.80	Intent
1970	27.76	Jean Marie
1970	35.42	Jardell
1971	26.01	Kapal
1971	27.76	Al-Direiyah
1971	37.55	Blackhawk
1971	26.85	Carronada
1972	31.12	Dora B
1972	23.85	Rob II
1972	32.22	Aldebaran
1973	35.38	Passage II
1973	33.55	Prosit
1973	45	Big R (renamed Secret Life)
1973	18.5	Almare
1974	39	Walanka (Renamed If Only)
1974	38	Bluemar II
1974	36.6	Emerald K
1974	28.30	Amphitrite
1974	28.35	Shalimar
1975	50	Ogina Bereton
1975	39.88	Lac II

== 1976–1985 ==
Year	Length overall in meters	Name	Reference
1976	17.5	Cheops	
1977	22.86	Maria	
1977	25.91	Impetuous	
1978	64.64	Al Riyadh	
1978	38.40	Claybeth (renamed Sireneuse)	
1979	60.55	Diana II (renamed Kingdom Come)	
1979	34.5	Karina C	
1979	48	Wedge One (renamed Avanti IV, Daria, Elizabeth F)	
1980	40	Enterprise (renamed Seagull)	
1980	51.25	Abu Al Abyadh	
1980	40.5	Dhafir	
1981	43.15	My Gail II (renamed Ramses)	
1981	41.70	Carmac VI (renamed King K)	
1981	36	Arkan	
1982	37.49	Cacique	
1982	50.65	Kalinga	
1982	45.80	Paminusch (renamed Strangelove)	
1982	40.23	Synthesis (renamed Halcyon)	
1983	59.95	New Horizon L (renamed Falcon Lair)	
1983	44.80	Azteca	
1983	42.35	Circus II (renamed A2)	
1983	46.6	Paraiso	
1983	50.65	Pharaon (renamed Illusion)	
1984	52	Rio Rita	
1984	37.95	Orion	
1984	42.31	Bridlewood (renamed Dreamseeker)	
1984	26.62	Gallant Lady	
1985	40.07	Gallant Lady (renamed Sea Ghost)	
1985	45.37	Enterprise IV (renamed Explora)	

== 1986–1995 ==
Year	Length overall in meters	Name	Reference
1986	46	The Highlander	
1986	43.95	Paminusch (renamed Montigne)	
1986	55.10	Cacique (renamed Calixe)	
1986	63.6	Cedar Sea II	
1986	38.71	Excellence (renamed Golden Rule)	
1986	55.5	Varmar Ve	
1987	33.68	Roverling (renamed Nepenthe)	
1987	44	Sea Jewel (renamed Time For Us)	
1987	40.44	Fiffanella (renamed Kingfisher)	
1987	43.43	Confidante (renamed Audacia)	
1988	50.90	Gallant Lady (renamed Ice Bear)	
1988	43.43	Impromptu (renamed Major Wager)	
1988	43	Easy to Love (renamed Athina II)	
1988	21.48	Patricia (renamed Elizabeth)	
1988	35.35	Gallant Lady (renamed Ozark Lady)	
1989	41.75	Faribana (renamed Allegra)	
1989	38.12	White Rabbit (renamed Odyssey)	
1989	42.5	September Blue (renamed Tugatsu)	
1989	55	Pharaon	
1989	46.5	Anastasia Ve (renamed Quintessa)	
1990	47.30	Mi Gaea (renamed Inevitable)	
1990	46.88	Charade	
1990	45.55	Alfa Alfa (renamed Marion Queen)	
1991	45.72	Carmac VII (renamed Lady Allison)	
1991	62.23	Virginian	
1991	36.45	Our Toy	
1991	63.63	Siran	
1992	49.99	Aurora	
1992	61	Mylin IV	
1992	39.62	Gallant Lady (renamed Never Enough)	
1993	51.20	Enterprise V	
1993	43	Sea Sedan (renamed Kahalani)	
1993	60	Lady Beatrice	
1993	51	Double Haven	
1994	47.5	Tatasu	
1994	44	Rora V (renamed Sanora)	
1994	46.90	Yemoja (renamed Hud Hud)	
1994	52	Rasselas (renamed Time For Us and now "Rasselas" again but not the original owner)	
1995	49.38	White Rabbit (renamed Pegasus)	
1995	52.46	Gallant Lady	
1995	52.15	Battered Bull	

== 1996–2005 ==
Year	Length overall in meters	Name	Picture	Reference
1996	55.00	Tits / Claire (renamed Samax)		
1996	60.6	Méduse		
1996	47.30	Vava		
1997	46.70	Quintessence (renamed Daybreak)		
1997	39.05	Irina (renamed Liberty GB)		
1997	48.20	Katrion (renamed Noa VII)		
1997	55	Sea Sedan (renamed Huntress)		
1997	30	Masquerade		
1998	49.99	Iroquois		
1998	49.5	Sussurro		
1998	48.80	Ulysses (renamed Teleost)		
1998	52	Solemates (renamed Ostar)		
1998	68.58	Attessa		
1999	47.5	Excellence II (renamed Princess K)		
1999	63.95	Lady Marina		
2000	50.28	Blue Moon II (renamed Déjà Vu)		
2000	53.34	Kisses		
2000	62.30	Cakewalk (renamed Fortunato)		
2001	46	Northern Light		
2001	56.5	Barbara Jean (renamed Hampshire)		
2001	46.63	Detroit Eagle (renamed Sea Racer)		
2002	60.10	Paraffin		
2002	40	Seaflower (Renamed Cipitouba)		
2002	62.3	Cakewalk (Renamed Faith)		
2002	65	Wedge Too		
2002	57	Olympia		
2003	42.56	Andiamo		
2003	38.55	Katrion		
2003	51.75	Dream		
2004	46.5	Rahal		
2004	86	Ecstasea		
2004	71.6	Utopia		
2004	49.99	High Chaparral		
2005	60.35	Blue Moon		
2005	62	Rasselas (Renamed Positive Carry)		

== 2006–2015 ==
Year	Length overall in meters	Name	Picture	Reference
2006	60.96	April Fool (Renamed Samadhi)		
2006	65.20	Callisto		
2007	51.21	Gallant Lady		
2007	61.21	Secret (renamed Majestic)		
2007	67	Anna		
2007	45	Space		
2007	45	Harle		
2008	72.80	Predator		
2008	67.75	Archimedes		
2008	39	Ocean Mercury		
2008	44.65	TV		
2009	65	Pestifer (Renamed Tanusha)		
2009	39	Kathleen Anne		
2009	75.75	Ocean Victory (Renamed Ebony Shine)		
2009	53.5	Hurricane Run		
2009	65.22	Trident		
2010	55.05	Kahalani		
2010	68	Lady Christine		
2010	44.65	Gladiator		
2011	87.78	Musashi		
2011	63	Lady Britt		
2011	77.70	Tango		
2011	87.78	Fountainhead		
2011	81	Air		
2011	44.65	Helix (Renamed Megan)		
2012	67.27	Drizzle		
2012	78	Hampshire II		
2012	78	Venus		
2013	45	Blue Sky		
2013	99	Madame Gu		
2013	57.60	Larissa		
2013	62	Sea Owl		
2014	46	Como (Renamed Lady May)		
2014	60	ROCK.IT		
2014	92.5	Royal Romance		
2015	83.50	Savannah		
2015	46.40	Kiss		
2015	44.20	Moon Sand		
2015	57.45	Halo		
2015	101.50	Symphony		

== 2016–present ==
Year	Length overall in meters	Name	Picture	Reference
2016	66.25	Vanish		
2016	33.50	Moon Sand Too		
2016	33.50	Kamino		
2016	33.50	Avatar		
2016	70	Joy		
2017	92	Aquarius		
2017	96.55	Faith		
2017	33.50	Letani		
2017	33.50	CID		
2017	73	Hasna		
2017	69.50	Samaya		
2018	47	Valoria		
2018	73.60	Sherpa		
2018	110	Anna		
2018	87	Lonian		
2018	51	Promise		
2019	93	Lady S		
2019	58	Najiba		
2019	77.25	PI		
2020	75	Arrow		
2020	99.50	Moonrise		
2020	72	Podium		
2021	49.65	Totally Nuts		
2021	76.50	Boardwalk		
2021	71.50	Vanish		
2021	88.38	Zen		
2021	94	Viva		
2021	55.20	Somnium		
2021	94.75	Bliss		
2021	54.90	Shinkai		
2022	71.10	Juice		
2022	42.50	Callisto		
2023	67.40	Sibelle		
2023	84.20	Obsidian		
2024	65	Promise:D		
2024	118	LaunchPad		
2024	102.60	Ulysses		
2024	75.70	Alvia		
2024	91.50	Drizzle		
2024	82.90	Sakura		
2024	59.50	B		
2025	118.8 (389 ft 9 in)	Breakthrough		

== Under construction ==
Planned delivery	Length overall in meters	Name	Reference
2025 (delivered)	75.80	'Les Cinq'	
2025 (delivered)	79.95	'Faith'	
2025 (delivered)	79.50	'Valor'	
2025 (delivered)	100	'Pi'	
2025 (delivered)	71.76	'Stella M'	
2026 (delivered)	101.20	'Destiny'	
2026	80	Hull 826	
TBA	89	Hull 828	
TBA	83	Hull 829	
2025 (delivered)	100.70	'Moonrise'	

== See also ==
- List of motor yachts by length
- Luxury yacht
- Feadship
