= Andrew Currie =

Andrew Currie may refer to:

- Andrew Currie (sculptor) (1813–1891), Scottish
- Andrew Currie (businessman) (born 1955), British businessman
- Andrew Currie (director) (born 1973), Canadian film director and screenwriter
- Andrew Currie, Canadian football player and coach with the Winnipeg Blue Bombers
