= Hampshire (yacht) =

Superyacht

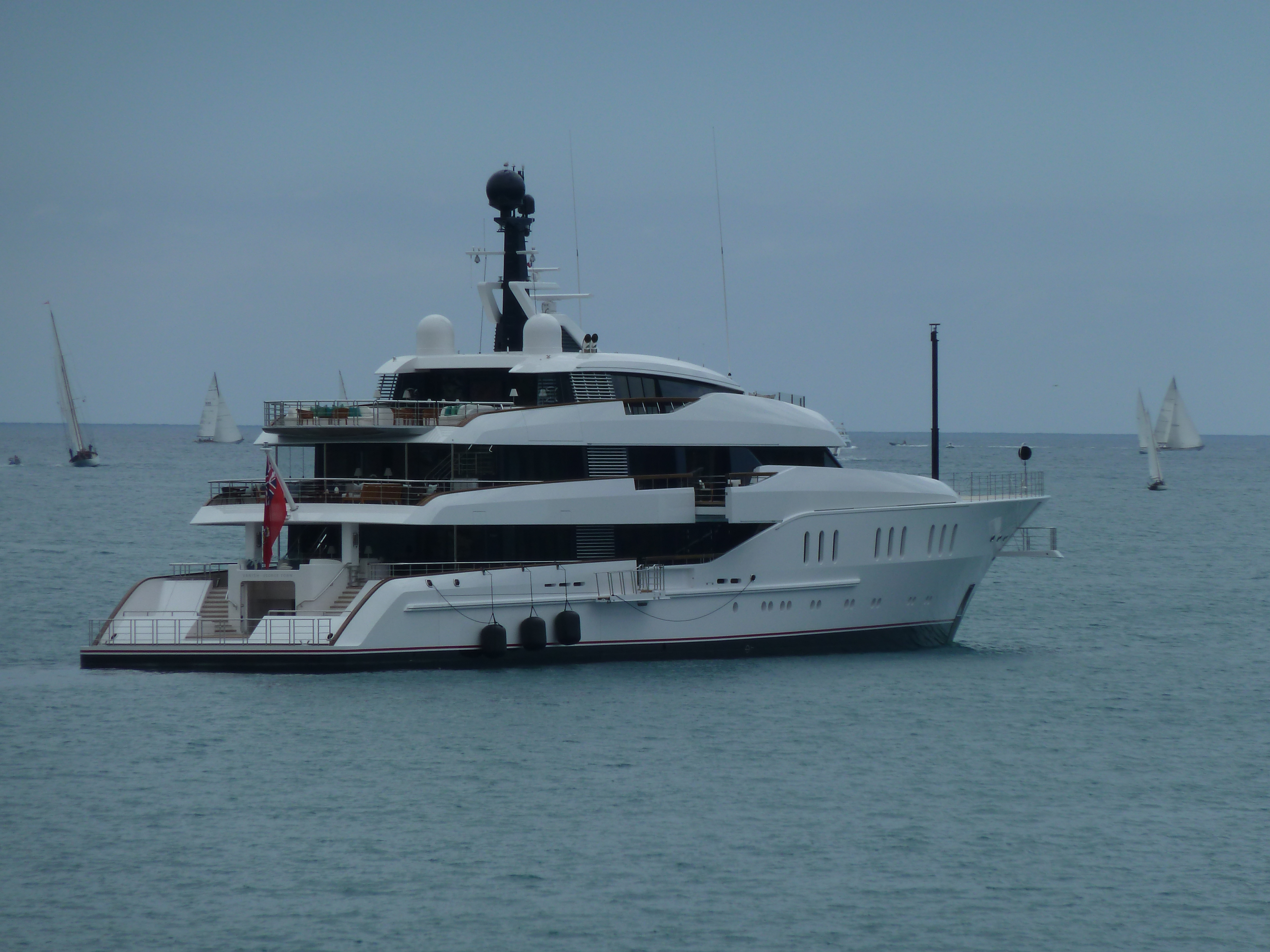

History

Cayman Islands
- Name: Hampshire (ex. Vanish)
- Owner: Andrew Currie
- Builder: Feadship
- Yard number: 809
- Launched: 2016
- In service: 2016
- Identification: IMO number: 9668142; MMSI number: 319092100; Callsign: ZGFK8

General characteristics
- Class & type: Motor yacht
- Tonnage: 1481 gross tons
- Length: 66.25 m (217.4 ft)
- Beam: 11.80 m (38.7 ft)
- Draught: 3.45 m (11.3 ft)
- Propulsion: twin 1,850hp MTU 12V4000 M53 engines
- Speed: 18.5 knots (34 km/h) (max)

The 66.25 m (217.4 ft) superyacht Hampshire was launched at the Feadship yard on Kaag Island as Vanish. The yacht was owned by Larry Van Tuyl before he sold her to Andrew Currie. London based designer Harrison Eidsgaard, designed both the interior and exterior of Hampshire.

== Design ==
Her length is 66.25 m (217.4 ft), beam is 11.80 m (38.7 ft) and she has a draught of 3.45 m (11.3 ft). The hull is built out of steel while the superstructure is made out of aluminium with teak laid decks. The yacht is classed by Lloyd's Register and registered in the Cayman Islands.

== Engines ==
She is powered by twin 1,850 hp MTU 12V4000 M53 engines.

== See also ==
- List of motor yachts by length
- List of yachts built by Feadship
