= Sophia (yacht) =

Yacht, manufactured in 2017 by Feadship

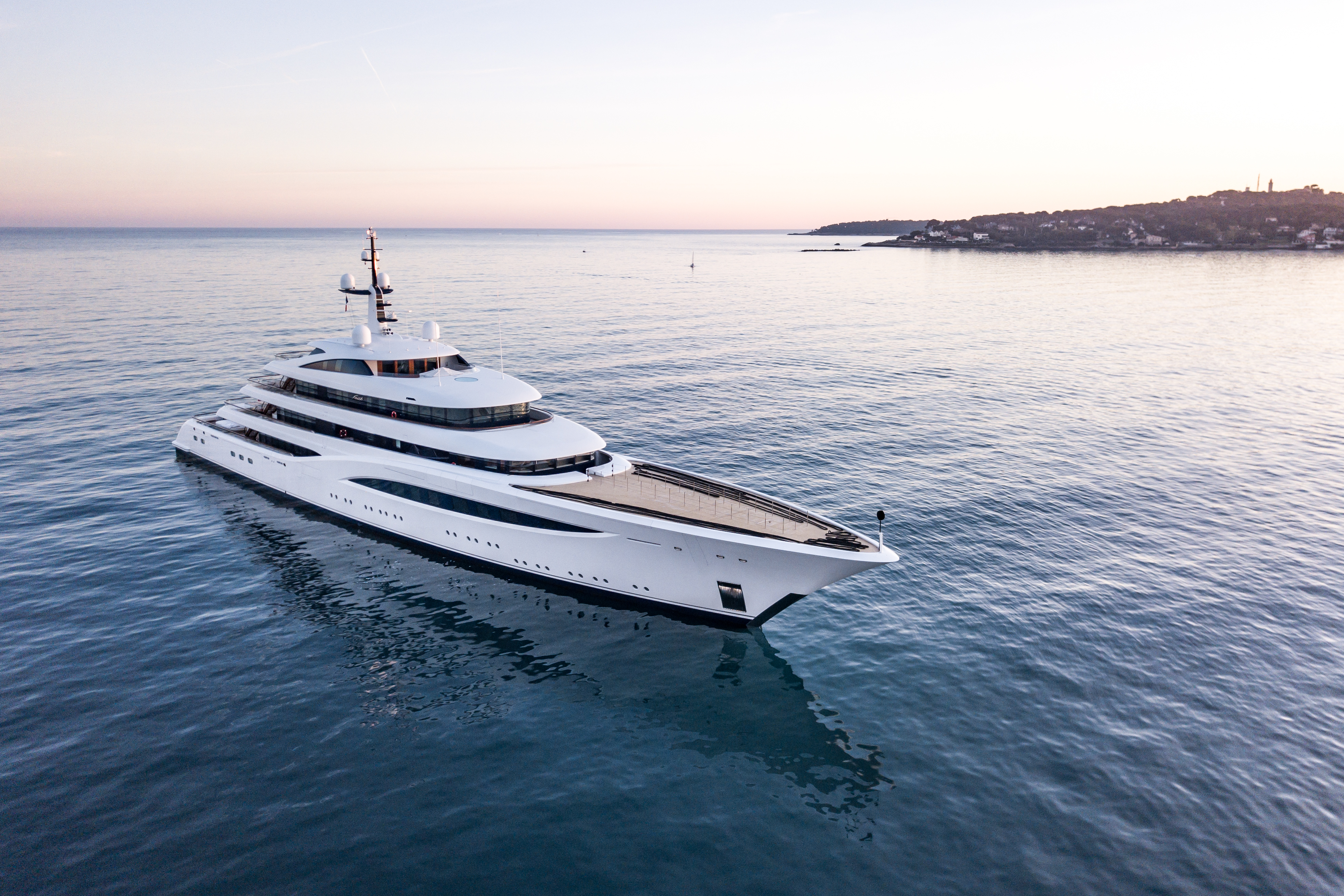

History

Cayman Islands
- Name: Sophia
- Owner: Michael Latifi
- Builder: Feadship
- Yard number: 1006
- Launched: 23 November 2016
- In service: 2017
- Identification: IMO number: 1012828; MMSI number: 319113600; Callsign: ZGGK7

General characteristics
- Class & type: Motor yacht
- Tonnage: 2,991 GT
- Length: 96.55 m (316 ft 9 in)
- Beam: 14.5 m (47 ft 7 in)
- Draught: 3.70 m (12 ft 2 in)
- Propulsion: 2 × 3,001 hp (2,238 kW) MTU (16V4000 M63L) diesel engines
- Speed: 17 knots (31 km/h) (maximum)
- Range: 5,000 nmi (9,300 km) at 12 knots (22 km/h)
- Capacity: 14 passengers
- Crew: 26

Sophia (formerly Faith) is a 96.55 m (316 ft 9 in) superyacht launched by Feadship in 2016 at their yard in Makkum and delivered later that same year as a replacement for the owner's previous yacht, now named Flag, which he sold in 2017 to Tommy Hilfiger. Stroll later sold Faith to her current owner, Michael Latifi.

== Design ==
Her length is 96.55 m (316 ft 9 in), beam is 14.50 m (47 ft 7 in) and she has a draught of 3.70 m (12 ft 2 in). Both exterior and interior designs are from RWD. The hull is built out of steel while the superstructure is made out of aluminium with teak-laid decks. The yacht is classed by Lloyd's Register and flagged in the Cayman Islands.

=== Amenities ===
Zero speed stabilizers, gym (with drop-down UltraLift TVs), elevator, swimming pool, movie theatre, piano, swimming platform, fire pit, air conditioning, BBQ, beach club, spa room, steam room, hammam, underwater lights, beauty salon. There is also a helicopter landing pad on the bow with a hangar underneath.

==== Tenders ====
- One 16 m (52 ft) Wajer 55
- One 10 m (33 ft) custom Feadship limo tender
- One 10 m (33 ft) custom Feadship Open tender
- One 7.01 m (23.0 ft) Nautique Super Air G23 Speed Boat

==== Recreational toys ====
Jet skis, seabobs, kayaks, Scuba sets, Water skiing gear, wakesurf board, water skis, windsurfing equipment and bikes are available.

=== Performance ===
She is powered by twin 3,001 hp (2,238 kW) MTU (16V4000 M63L) diesel engines. The engines power two propellers, which in turn propel the ship to a top speed of 17 knots (31 km/h) and a cruising speed of 14 knots (26 km/h). Her maximum range is 5,000 nautical miles (9,300 km) at 12 knots (22 km/h).

== See also ==
- List of motor yachts by length
- List of yachts built by Feadship
