= A Royal Romance =

A Royal Romance may refer to:

- A Royal Romance (1930 film), an American romantic comedy film
- A Royal Romance (1917 film), a lost silent film comedy drama
- Harry & Meghan: A Royal Romance, a 2018 historical fiction television film
- Royal Romance (yacht), a luxury yacht
