= Predator (yacht) =

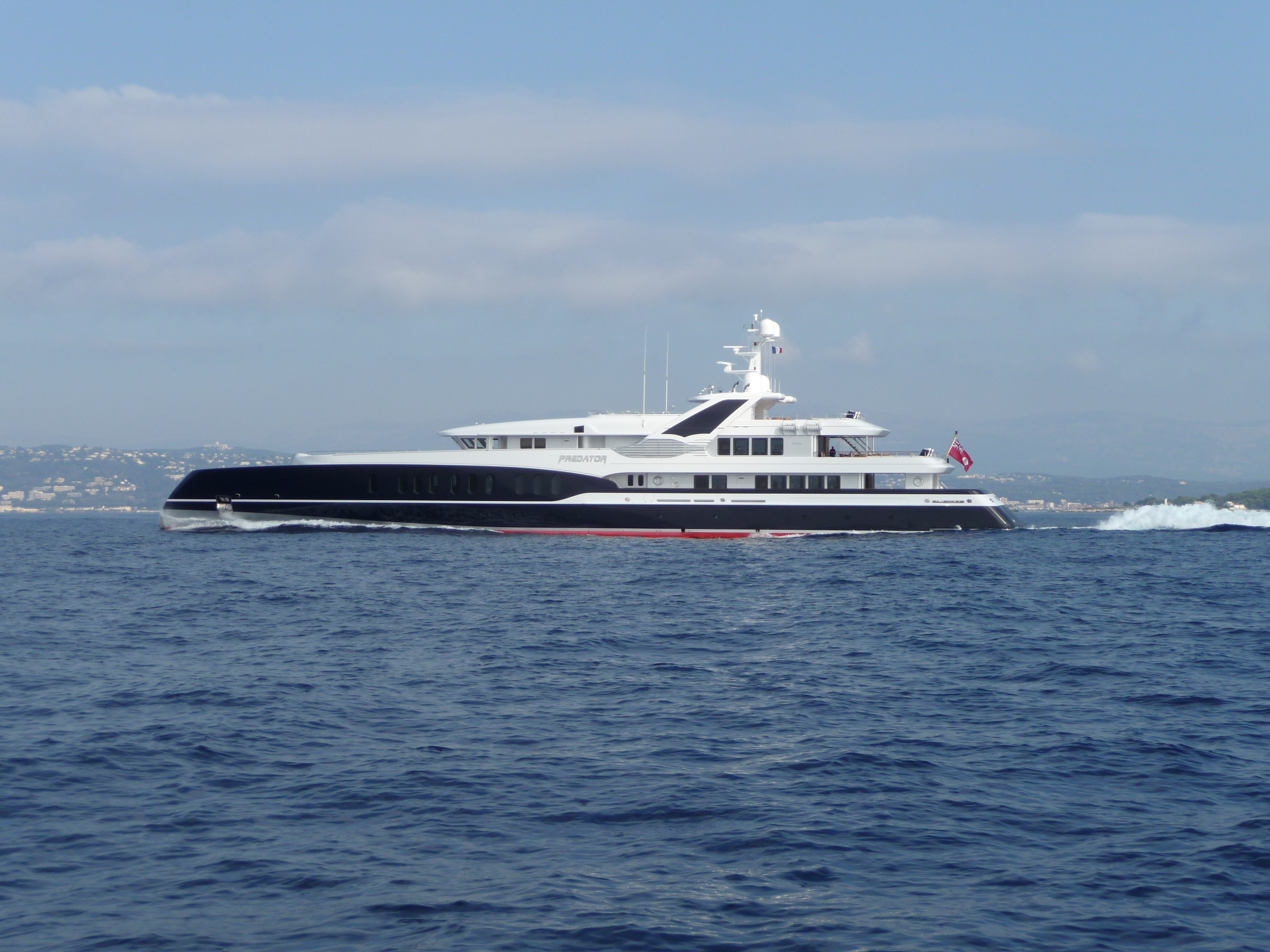

History

Cayman Islands
- Name: Predator
- Owner: Unknown - Sold 2019
- Builder: Feadship
- Yard number: 674
- Launched: 5 January 2008
- Identification: IMO number: 1009314; MMSI number: 319300000; Callsign: ZCTY5

General characteristics
- Class & type: Motor yacht
- Tonnage: 1,467gross tons
- Length: 72.80 m (238.8 ft)
- Beam: 11.40 m (37.4 ft)
- Draught: 3.70 m (12.1 ft)
- Propulsion: 4 × MTU 16V 595 TE90; 4 × 5.793 hp (4.320 kW)
- Speed: 28 knots (52 km/h) (maximum); 20 knots (37 km/h) (cruising)
- Capacity: 6 passengers
- Crew: 18 crew members

Predator is a superyacht built in 2008 at the Dutch shipyard Royal De Vries Aalsmeer. The interior design of the Predator was done by Bannenberg Designs and the exterior by De Voogt Naval Architects.

== Design ==
The length of the yacht is 72.80 m (238.8 ft) and the beam is 11.40 m (37.4 ft). The draught of the Predator is 3.70 m (12.1 ft). The hull is steel, with the superstructure made of aluminium. The yacht is Lloyd's registered, issued by Cayman Islands.

== Engines ==
The main engines are four MTU 16V 595 TE90 with power of 5.793 hp (4.320 kW). The Predator can reach a maximum speed of over 28 knots (52 km/h), while the cruising speed is 20 knots (37 km/h).

== See also ==
- List of motor yachts by length
- List of yachts built by Feadship
- Motor yacht
