= Lunasea (yacht) =

Ship built in 2017

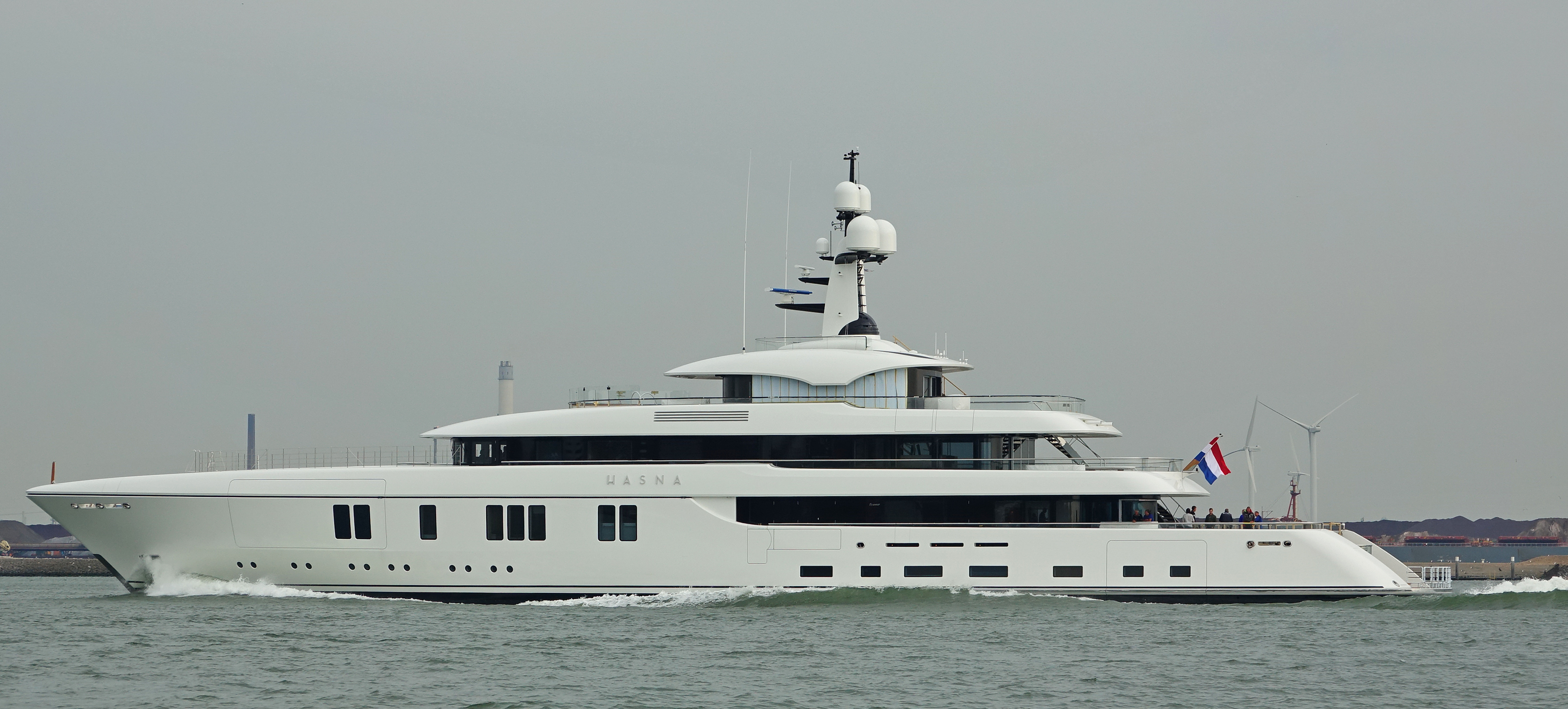

History

Cayman Islands
- Name: Lunasea (ex Hasna)
- Owner: Yahn Bernier
- Builder: Feadship
- Yard number: 813
- Launched: 2017
- In service: 2017
- Identification: IMO number: 1013092; MMSI number: 319118200; Callsign: ZGGO7

General characteristics
- Class & type: Motor yacht
- Tonnage: 1577 gross tons
- Length: 73 m (240 ft)
- Beam: 11.90 m (39.0 ft)
- Draught: 3.45 m (11.3 ft)
- Propulsion: Twin 1,850hp MTU 12V4000 M53 engines
- Speed: 16.5 knots (31 km/h) (max); 14 knots (26 km/h) (cruising)
- Range: 5.500 nm at 12 knots (22 km/h)
- Capacity: 12 passengers
- Crew: 21

Lunasea, formerly known as Hasna, was launched at the Feadship yard at the Kaag Island in 2017. It is a 73 m (240 ft) superyacht. She was delivered to her first owner, John Symond, later that year. Hasna was listed for sale for the first time in 2019 and reported to be sold in 2020 to American businessman Yahn Bernier. Subsequently, her name was changed to Lunasea.

== Design ==
British designer Redman Whiteley Dixon, designed both the interior and exterior of Lunasea. Her length is 73 m (240 ft), beam is 11.90 m (39.0 ft) and she has a draught of 3.45 m (11.3 ft). The hull is built out of steel while the superstructure is made out of aluminium with teak laid decks. The yacht is classed by Lloyd's registered and flagged in the Cayman Islands.

== Engines ==
She is powered by twin 1,850 hp MTU 12V4000 M53 engines.

== Incidents ==
At early morning of July 27 2021, the yacht was attempted to be burglarized by a man while the 20 crew members inside the yacht were sleeping. The captain had heard someone walking in his office. Thinking it was a crew member, he went into the office to find a male inside searching the office. The captain and the crew detained the suspect and did not resist. The suspect later got arrested.

== See also ==
- List of motor yachts by length
- List of yachts built by Feadship
