= Eddie Lampert =

American businessman (born 1962)

- Born: Edward Scott Lampert; July 19, 1962 (age 64); Roslyn, New York, US
- Education: Yale University
- Occupation: Hedge fund manager
- Title: Chairman, Transform Holdco LLC
- Term: February 2019-
- Board member of: Sears Holdings Corporation; ESL Investments
- Spouse: Kinga Keh (m. 2001)
- Children: 3

Chairman, Sears Holdings
- In office January 2013 – February 14, 2019
- Preceded by: Herman Darling
- Succeeded by: Office abolished (assets sold to Transform Holdco LLC)

Chairman, Transform Holdco LLC
- Incumbent
- Assumed office February 2019
- Preceded by: Office established

Edward Scott Lampert (born July 19, 1962) is an American billionaire businessman. He is the former chief executive and chairman of Sears Holdings, the founder of Transformco, and the founder, chairman, and chief executive of ESL Investments. Until May 2007, he was a director of AutoNation. He was a director of AutoZone from 1999 to 2006. As of December 2025, his net worth was estimated at US$2.2 billion.

== Early life ==
Lampert was born in 1962 to Dolores Lampert and Floyd M. Lampert. His mother was a housewife. His father was a senior partner in the law firm of Lampert & Lampert in New York City. His family is Jewish. He has a younger sister Tracey. Lampert's grandmother was a passive investor and a fan of Louis Rukeyser's Wall Street Week television program. She instilled in him an interest in investing. His mother would later recall that young Eddie would sit with his grandmother reviewing and evaluating the performance of her stock picks in the daily newspaper.

Lampert's father died in 1977, and his mother took a job as a clerk at Saks Fifth Avenue. His mother would later say: "Eddie really assumed the responsibility, knowing that life had changed and we had to accomplish something by ourselves now." In order to help support his family, Lampert worked after school and on weekends at various warehouses, stocking shelves and filling orders. Despite working, he earned good grades, played both soccer and basketball, and won the scholar athlete award at his high school. He received financial aid to help pay for college. Lampert graduated from Yale University in 1984 with a bachelor's degree in economics, summa cum laude, where he was a member of Skull and Bones and Phi Beta Kappa.

== Career ==
In July 1984, Lampert worked as an intern at Goldman Sachs, and then worked in the firm's risk arbitrage department from March 1985 to February 1988. While there, he worked directly with Robert Rubin. When Lampert decided to go out on his own, Rubin warned him it would be a bad career decision.

In April 1988, Lampert left the bank to form ESL Investments, based in Greenwich, Connecticut (the name derives from Lampert's initials). Richard Rainwater, whom Lampert had met on Nantucket Island, gave him $28 million in seed money and introduced him to clients, such as David Geffen.

A 2004 profile by Businessweek likened Lampert's investment style to that of financier Warren Buffett. Lampert's earnings in 2004 were estimated to be $1.02 billion, making him the first Wall Street financial manager to exceed an income of $1 billion in a single year. In 2006, Lampert was featured on the Time 100 list for most influential people in the world for being one of the "brightest minds on Wall Street" and leading a new class of activist hedge funds. Lampert was the richest person in Connecticut in 2006 with a net worth of $3.8 billion.

In March 2012, Lampert was No. 367 on the Forbes world's wealthiest people list with a net worth of $3.1 billion. By August 2016, Lampert had fallen to No. 810 on the list, with a net worth of $2.2 billion.

In January 2013, it was announced that Lampert would take over as chief executive officer at Sears after Louis D'Ambrosio stepped down due to family health matters; this took effect in May 2013.

Lampert restructured Sears into approximately 30 separate business units, which were evaluated based on individual profits, rather than any estimation of their effect on Sears' overall profit. These units were to buy and sell services among themselves through competitive bidding. Some sources say these policies were based upon the ideas of Ayn Rand. It is generally agreed that they failed to slow Sears' decline.

In July 2016 he held 28% of shares in Sears Holdings Corp, worth approximately $408 million.

In early 2017, Lampert – then president, chief executive officer, and top shareholder of Sears Holdings – was estimated to have personal assets of $2 billion, primarily in the hedge fund ESL Investments. Early in the year, he committed to providing an additional loan of $500 million to Sears and said he would provide letters of credit to Sears for additional amounts, reportedly totaling $200 million and possibly increasing to a half billion dollars in the future.

Lampert was criticized by employees and corporate staff for "shredding" his employees in meat grinders and "being out of touch with reality", as well as for failing to invest in the physical stores, as many of them were deteriorating. During his tenure as chief executive, Sears lost around half its value within five years, and closed more than half of its physical stores.

On October 15, 2018, Lampert stepped down as chief executive of Sears Holdings, while remaining chairman of the board, as part of Sears Holdings bankruptcy actions. On December 6, 2018, Lampert, through his company ESL Investments, offered to buy all of Sears for $4.6 billion in cash and stock. The offer would be financed by $950 million in added debt, but no additional cash. In early 2019, five hundred stores remained in operation; the remainder were in liquidation. According to a company filing, Lampert stepped down as chairman of Sears Holdings Corp on February 14, 2019.

In January 2019, a group of Sears' creditors, hoping to persuade a federal judge to force Sears to liquidate, alleged that Lampert had orchestrated a "multiyear and multifaceted scheme" to strip away the company's assets and benefit from its decline. In April 2019, Sears sued Lampert and some of the company's former board members, including Treasury Secretary Steve Mnuchin alleging that Lampert stole billions of dollars from the company by transferring $2 billion in assets to himself and other shareholders.

In May 2019, Lampert, months after purchasing the remains of Sears from the holding company, threatened not to pay out the $43 million in pension payments owed to 90,000 former Sears and Kmart employees and retirees.

In December of 2024, a lawsuit for $177M was filed in bankruptcy court against Lampert and the companies he controls by a Trustee of Sears Hometown Stores.

== Personal life ==
In 2001, Lampert married Kinga Keh, an attorney with whom he has three children. They own houses in Indian Creek Village, Florida, Aspen, Colorado and Greenwich, Connecticut. The couple are active members of their local Chabad house.

Lampert is the owner of the Fountainhead, an 87.78 m (288 ft) motor luxury yacht named after the Ayn Rand novel of the same name.

In 2003, Lampert was kidnapped from the parking lot of his Greenwich office but persuaded his captors to let him go after two days of captivity by promising to pay them a ransom after the captors compromised themselves by ordering a pizza with his credit card.

Lampert is a self-proclaimed supporter of free market economics and is a fan of Objectivism writer Ayn Rand.

Media offices
Preceded by Herman Darling	Chairman of Sears Holdings; January 2013 – February 2019	Succeeded by Vacant
Preceded by Herman Darling	CEO of Sears Holdings; January 2013 – October 2018	Succeeded by Vacant
Preceded by	CEO & Chairman of ESL Investments; April 1988 –	Succeeded by incumbent
