= Samaya (yacht) =

Ship built in 2017

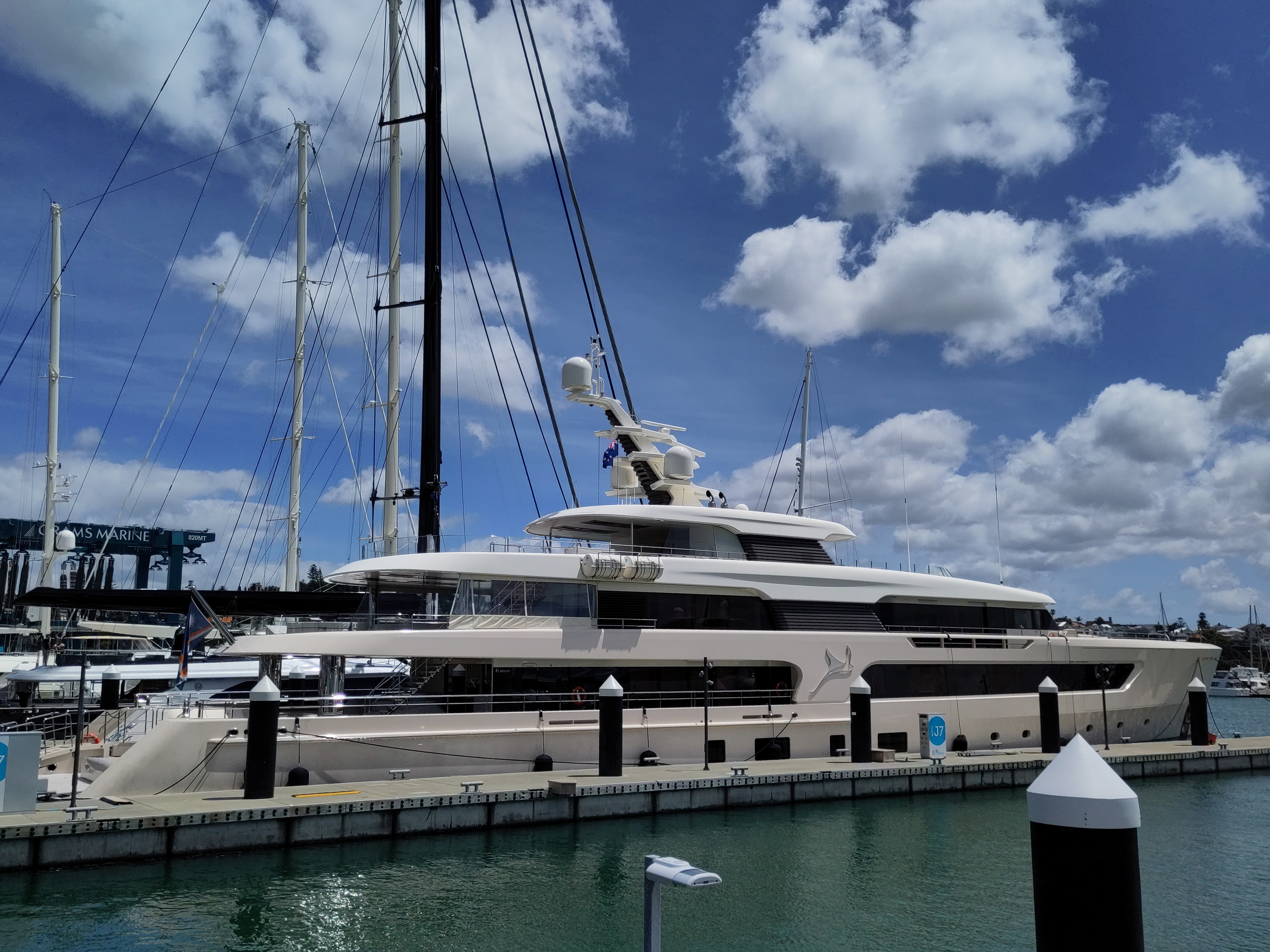

History

Marshall Islands
- Name: Samaya
- Builder: Feadship
- Yard number: 696
- Launched: 2017
- In service: 2017
- Identification: IMO number: 1013157; MMSI number: 538071199; Callsign: V7DJ8
- Notes: Previous names: Crazy Days

General characteristics
- Class & type: Motor yacht
- Tonnage: 1,347 GT
- Length: 69.50 m (228.0 ft)
- Beam: 11.40 m (37.4 ft)
- Draught: 3.40 m (11.2 ft)
- Propulsion: twin 1,850hp MTU 12V4000 M53 engines
- Speed: 16.4 knots (30 km/h) (max)
- Capacity: 12 guests
- Crew: 16

The 69.50 m (228.0 ft) superyacht Samaya was launched at the Feadship yard in Aalsmeer. British designer Redman Whiteley Dixon, designed the interior. Exterior of Samaya was designed by Feadship inhouse design studio De Voogt.

== Design ==
Her length is 69.50 m (228.0 ft), beam is 11.40 m (37.4 ft) and she has a draught of 3.40 m (11.2 ft). The hull is built out of steel while the superstructure is made out of aluminium with teak laid decks. She is powered by twin 1,850 hp MTU 12V4000 M53 engines. The yacht is classed by Lloyd's Register and flagged in the Marshall Islands.

=== Accommodation ===
Samaya's interior configuration has been designed to accommodate up to 12 guests overnight in 6 cabins, comprising a master suite, 1 VIP stateroom. She is also capable of carrying up to 16 crew on board.

== See also ==
- List of motor yachts by length
- List of yachts built by Feadship
