= Venus (yacht) =

Super yacht built in 2012

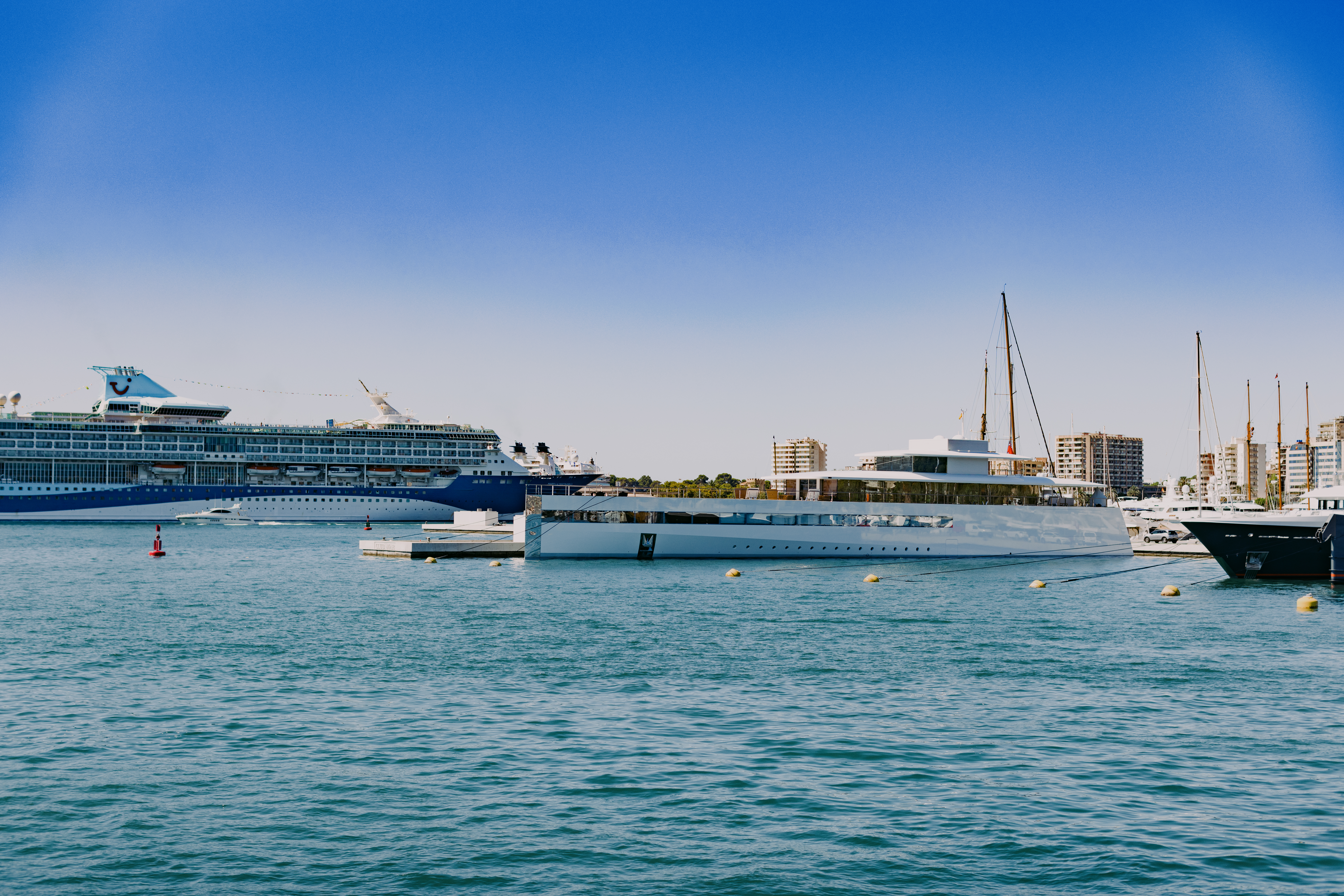
- Steve Jobs' yacht Venus in Majorca

History
- Name: Venus
- Owner: Laurene Powell Jobs
- Port of registry: George Town, Cayman Islands
- Builder: Feadship Netherlands Koninklijke NV De Vries Scheepsbouw
- Cost: €100 million
- Launched: 28 October 2012
- Christened: 2012
- In service: 2012-present
- Identification: IMO number: 1011836; MMSI number: 319327000; Callsign: ZGCS8
- Status: In service

General characteristics
- Type: Super yacht
- Tonnage: 1,876 GT
- Length: 78.20 m (256.6 ft)
- Beam: 11.80 m (38.7 ft)
- Draught: 3.00 m (9.84 ft)
- Notes: Data from builder

Venus is a super yacht designed by Philippe Starck's design company Ubik and built by Feadship for the entrepreneur Steve Jobs at a cost of €105 million. Jobs died in October 2011, a year before the yacht was unveiled.

== History ==
Venus was unveiled 28 October 2012 at the Feadship shipyard. The yacht was named for the Roman goddess of love.

The yacht was impounded 21 December 2012 at the Port of Amsterdam following a payment dispute: Starck claimed Jobs's heirs owed him €3 million of his €9 million fee for the project. The dispute was resolved after a few days.

On 22 July 2024, the yacht collided with Lady Moura, another private yacht, off the coast of Naples, Italy, causing damage to both vessels.

== See also ==
- List of motor yachts by length
- List of yachts built by Feadship
