= Savannah (yacht) =

Superyacht built in The Netherlands in 2015

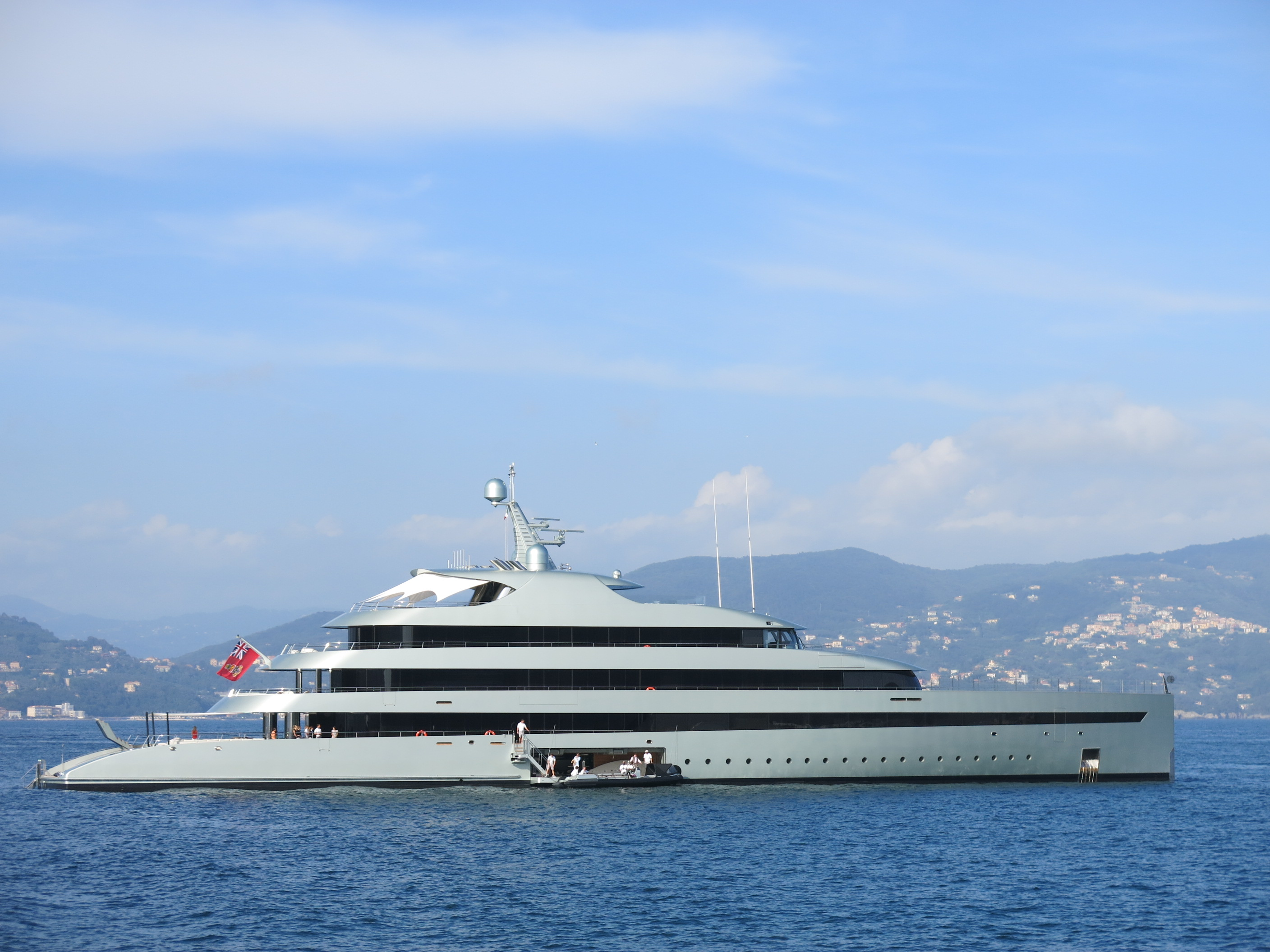

History

Marshall Islands
- Name: Savannah
- Owner: Lukas Lundin
- Builder: Feadship
- Yard number: 686
- Completed: 2015
- Identification: IMO number: 1012517; MMSI number: 319074500; Callsign: ZGDG3

General characteristics
- Class & type: Motor yacht
- Tonnage: 2.250 gross tons
- Length: 83.5 m (274 ft)
- Beam: 12.5 m (41 ft)
- Draught: 3.95 m (13.0 ft)
- Propulsion: 1 x Wärtsilä - 9L20C - 1.800 kW (2.414 hp) @1000 rpm; 1 x Caterpillar C32 - 970 kW (1,300 hp) @1800 rpm; 2 x Caterpillar C18 - 550 kW (740 hp) @1800 rpm
- Capacity: 12 persons
- Crew: 22/26 persons

Savannah is a super-yacht built in 2015 at the Dutch Feadship yard in Aalsmeer.

The yacht blends a single diesel engine, three gensets, batteries, propeller, and azimuting pioneering electro-mechanical propulsion platform. This combination offers fuel savings of thirty percent. It is equipped with a 1 MWh battery from Corvus Energy

De Voogt Naval Architects and CG Design collaborated to design the vessel.

The filming of The Woman in Cabin 10 (2025) took place on the yacht.

== Design ==
The length of the yacht is 83.5 m (274 ft) and the beam is 12.5 m (41 ft). The draught of Savannah is 3.95 m (13.0 ft). The hull is steel, while the superstructure is constructed from aluminium with teak-laid decks. The yacht is Lloyd's registered, issued in the Cayman Islands.

== Prizes ==
At the 2016 Showboats Design Awards, Savannah won multiple prizes:

- Exterior Design & Styling Award - Motor Yacht Above 500GT
- Interior Layout & Design Award - Motor Yacht Above 500GT
- Holistic Design Award - Motor Yacht

Also at the 2016 World Superyacht Awards, Savannah won multiple prizes:

- Displacement motor yachts 1,300GT to 2,999GT
- Motor Yacht of the Year 2016

== See also ==
- Motor yacht
- List of motor yachts by length
- List of yachts built by Feadship
