= Ecstasea =

Luxury yacht built by Feadship

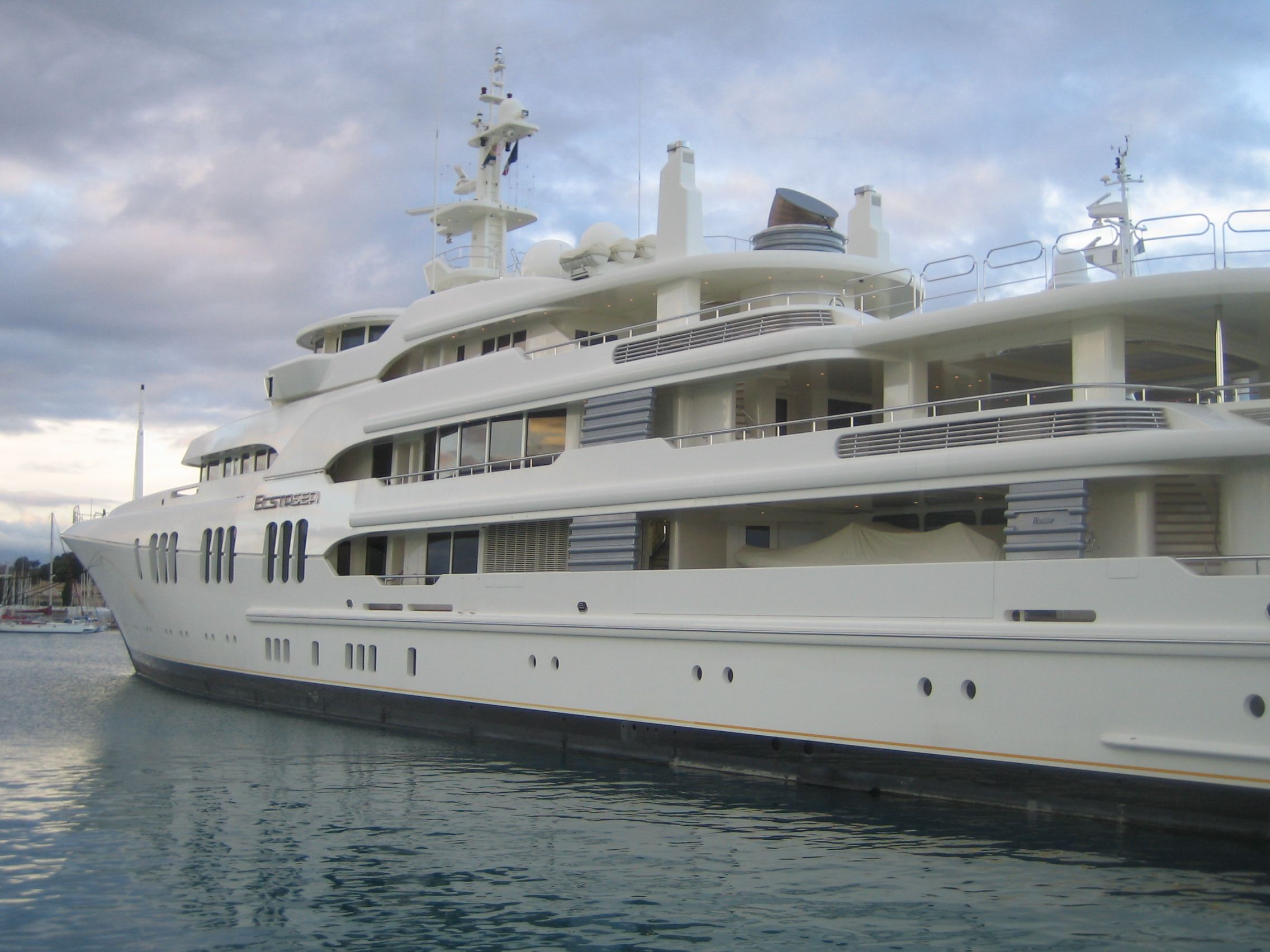

History

Cayman Islands
- Name: Ecstasea
- Builder: Royal Van Lent Shipyard
- Completed: 2004
- Acquired: 2004, Roman Abramovich
- Identification: Call sign: ZCYS8; IMO number: 1008102; MMSI number: 319009900

General characteristics
- Class & type: Yacht
- Displacement: 585 metric tons
- Length: 86.00 m (282.15 ft)
- Beam: 11.85 m (38.9 ft)
- Draft: 3.8 m (12 ft)
- Propulsion: 4 × MTU diesel engines 4 × 3,111hp; 1 × GE LM2500 gas turbine 1 × 30,843hp; (Total power = 43,287hp)
- Speed: 30+ (maximum with gas turbine boost); 25 knots (maximum diesel only); 22 knots (cruising diesel only)
- Capacity: 14 passengers
- Crew: 24 crew members

Ecstasea is a luxury yacht, the biggest Feadship built when she was launched. In June 2009 she was sold by her original owner, the Russian oligarch Roman Abramovich, to Alshair Fiyaz by yacht brokers Merle Wood.

== Design ==
Ordered by Russian oligarch Roman Abramovich, Ecstasea was built in 2004 as the largest Feadship ever built. The casco came from Eltink Shipyard and the yacht was completed in the shipyard of Royal Van Lent and has length of 85.95 metres (282.0 ft), and a beam of 11.50 metres (37.7 ft), with a Deadweight of 585 metric tons. The yacht is made of all steel, and is much closer to a luxury ship, than to a yacht.

Her exterior design was created by the teamwork of Terence Disdale and De Voogt Naval Architects, with Disdale also responsible for the yacht's Asian-style interior. David Waite-Wright, who was Senior Designer at Disdales, oversaw the project. The yacht later went on to win multiple interior design awards. She has capacity for 14 passengers, who are divided into 6 separate rooms.

== Engine ==
The yacht has four main MTU engines with a combined power of 12,444 hp. The builder also installed a General Electric LM2500 gas turbine on board, which produces 30,843 hp. The total combined horsepower of 43,287 hp allows the yacht to reach a maximum speed of more than 30 knots. The maximum speed with only the diesel engines working is 25 knots. The cruising speed (diesel only) is 22 knots.

== Incidents ==
On December 15, 2019, Ecstasea clipped the Simpson Bay Bridge, St. Maarten. The yacht sustained minor hull damage, but a small operation room attached to the bridge was destroyed and fell into the bay. This incident was captured on video and posted to Reddit. It is estimated that the vessel was traveling at less than 3 knots.

The St. Maarten Daily Herald reported that this was not the first time the booth has been damaged by incoming vessels. In this particular incident, the yacht was blown off course by “adverse current and wind conditions.” The operator was able to escape the booth in time, and the bridge itself was not substantively damaged, neither were the controls. The bridge resumed normal operations on Monday, December 16.

== See also ==
- List of motor yachts by length
- Pelorus
