= Symphony (yacht) =

Yacht owned by Bernard Arnault

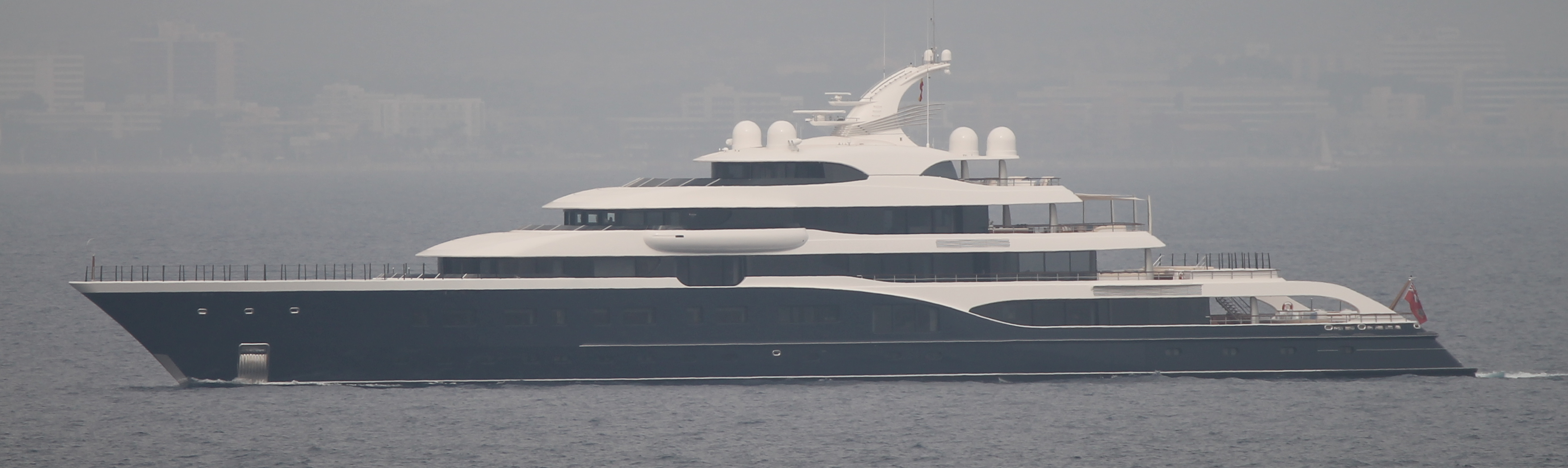

History

Cayman Islands
- Name: Symphony
- Owner: Bernard Arnault
- Builder: Feadship
- Yard number: 808
- Launched: 2015
- Completed: 2015
- In service: 2015
- Identification: IMO number: 1012098; MMSI number: 319076700; Callsign: ZGEP2

General characteristics
- Class & type: Motor yacht
- Tonnage: 3.000 gross tons
- Length: 101.5 m (333 ft)
- Beam: 14.1 m (46 ft)
- Draught: 4.1 m (13 ft)
- Capacity: 20 persons
- Crew: 38 persons

Symphony is a yacht owned by Bernard Arnault. At the time of its completion in 2015, Symphony was the longest yacht ever built in the Netherlands.

Symphony was built by Feadship. As of 2015, the 101.5-metre (333 ft), six-deck “Symphony” luxury super yacht was the largest Feadship had ever built, and the first Feadship to cross the 100-metre mark. Designed to carry 20 passengers in 8 cabins and with a crew of 38 in 16 cabins, it complied with the Passenger Yacht Code. Symphony has a 6-metre (20 ft) glass-bottom swimming pool on the main deck, an outdoor cinema on the bridge deck, and a jacuzzi on the sun deck. A sauna, a private office and a study, a lounge and an aft deck area for lounging with a dining table for 20 are included. The ship's exterior was designed by Tim Heywood.

The yacht is sailing under Cayman Islands flag.

== Engine ==
Symphony has four main diesel engines (Type: MTU 20V 4000 M73 – 2,560 kW or 3,433 hp) each. This provides it with a combined power of 10,240 kW (13,732 hp).

== See also ==
- List of motor yachts by length
- List of yachts built by Feadship
