= Madame Gu =

Superyacht built in 2013

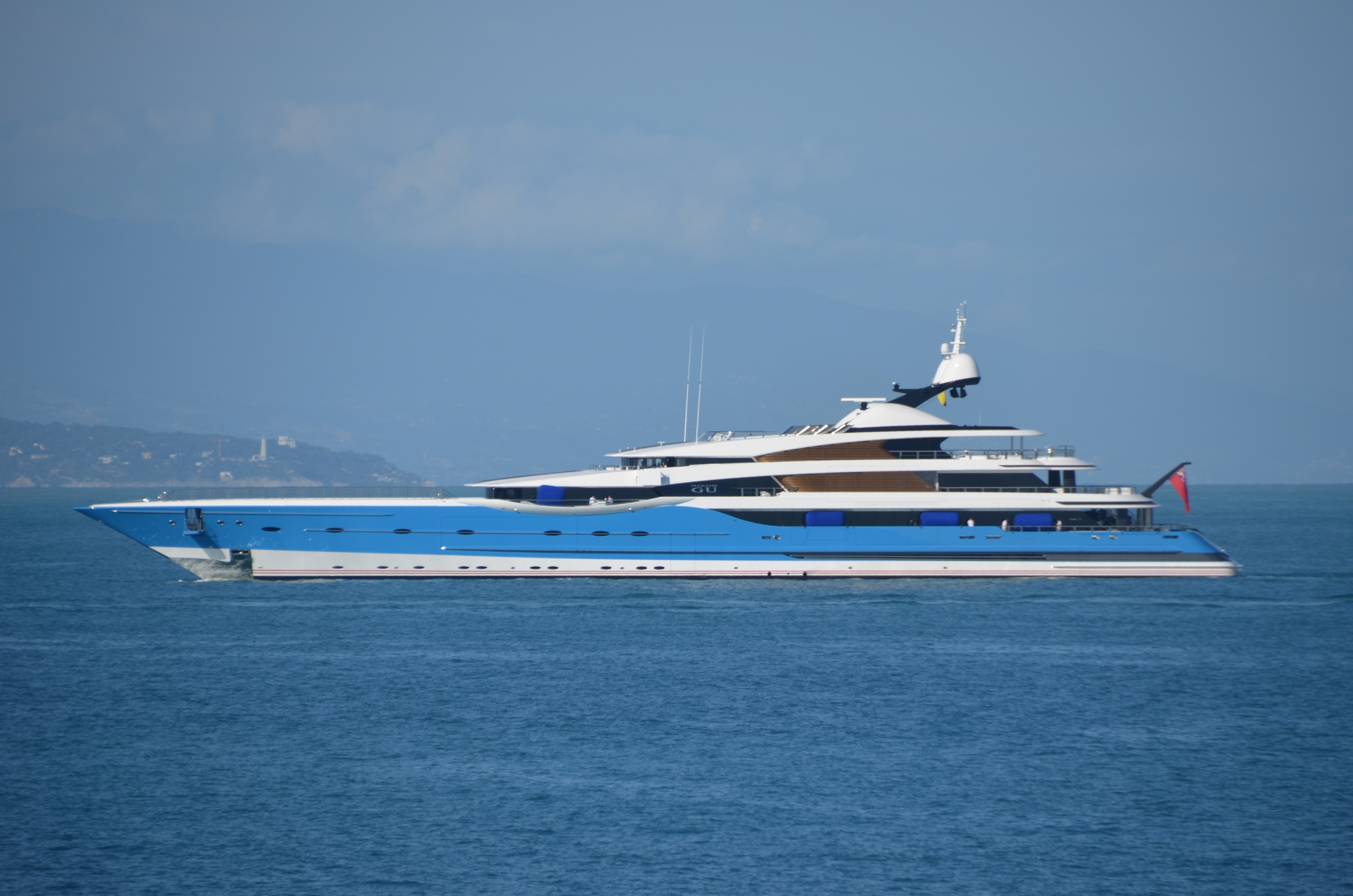
- Madame Gu near Antibes

History

Cayman Islands
- Name: Madame Gu
- Owner: Andrei Skoch
- Ordered: 2011
- Builder: Feadship
- Yard number: 1004
- Launched: 7 February 2013
- In service: 2013
- Identification: IMO number: 1011331; MMSI number: 319906000; Callsign: ZGCW7
- Status: Active

General characteristics
- Class & type: Motor yacht
- Tonnage: 2.920 gross tons
- Length: 99 m (325 ft)
- Beam: 13.60 m (44.6 ft)
- Draught: 4.60 m (15.1 ft)
- Propulsion: 2 × MTU 20V 4000 M73; 4.828 hp (3.600 kW)
- Speed: 24 knots (44 km/h) (maximum)
- Capacity: 12 passengers
- Crew: 36 crew members

Madame Gu is a superyacht built in 2013 at the Dutch Feadship yard in Makkum. She was built as Project Dream. Madame Gu is designed by Andrew Winch Designs, who were responsible for both interior and exterior, opting for contemporary details in a classical style. Naval architecture was done by De Voogt Naval Architects.

== History ==
In March 2022, Forbes reported that the yacht Madame Gu, formerly known as Dream, was still owned by Andrei Skoch. At 325 feet and registered in the Cayman Islands with a value of $156 million, by that month it had been sanctioned by the US, EU, UK, Australia, Canada, Japan, and Switzerland. It was recorded in the UAE on March 6, and blocked by the US on June 2, 2022. When designating it blocked property, US Department of the Treasury noted it contained a private helicopter, an elevator, beach club, gym, and also required "significant maintenance and repair" including around $1 million for painting annually. On June 23, 2022, it was recorded docked in Dubai, and had been since March 25. The Washington Post said the docking was a "a test for the close partnership between the United States and United Arab Emirates." It was observed flying an Emirati flag.

== Design ==
The length of the yacht is 99 m (325 ft) and the beam is 13.60 m (44.6 ft). The draught of Madame Gu is 4.60 m (15.1 ft). The hull material is steel, while the superstructure is made out of aluminum with teak laid decks. The yacht is Lloyd's registered, issued by the Cayman Islands.

== Engine ==
The main engines are two MTU 20V 4000 M73 with a power of 4.828 hp (3.600 kW) each. Madame Gu can reach a maximum speed of 24 knots (44 km/h).

== Prizes ==
At the World Superyachts Award gala in Amsterdam, she won the award for best Displacement Motor Yacht of 2,000GT and above. She was also presented with the prize of Superyacht of the Year 2014.

== See also ==
- Motor yacht
- List of motor yachts by length
- List of yachts built by Feadship
