= Sea Owl (yacht) =

Yacht built in 2013

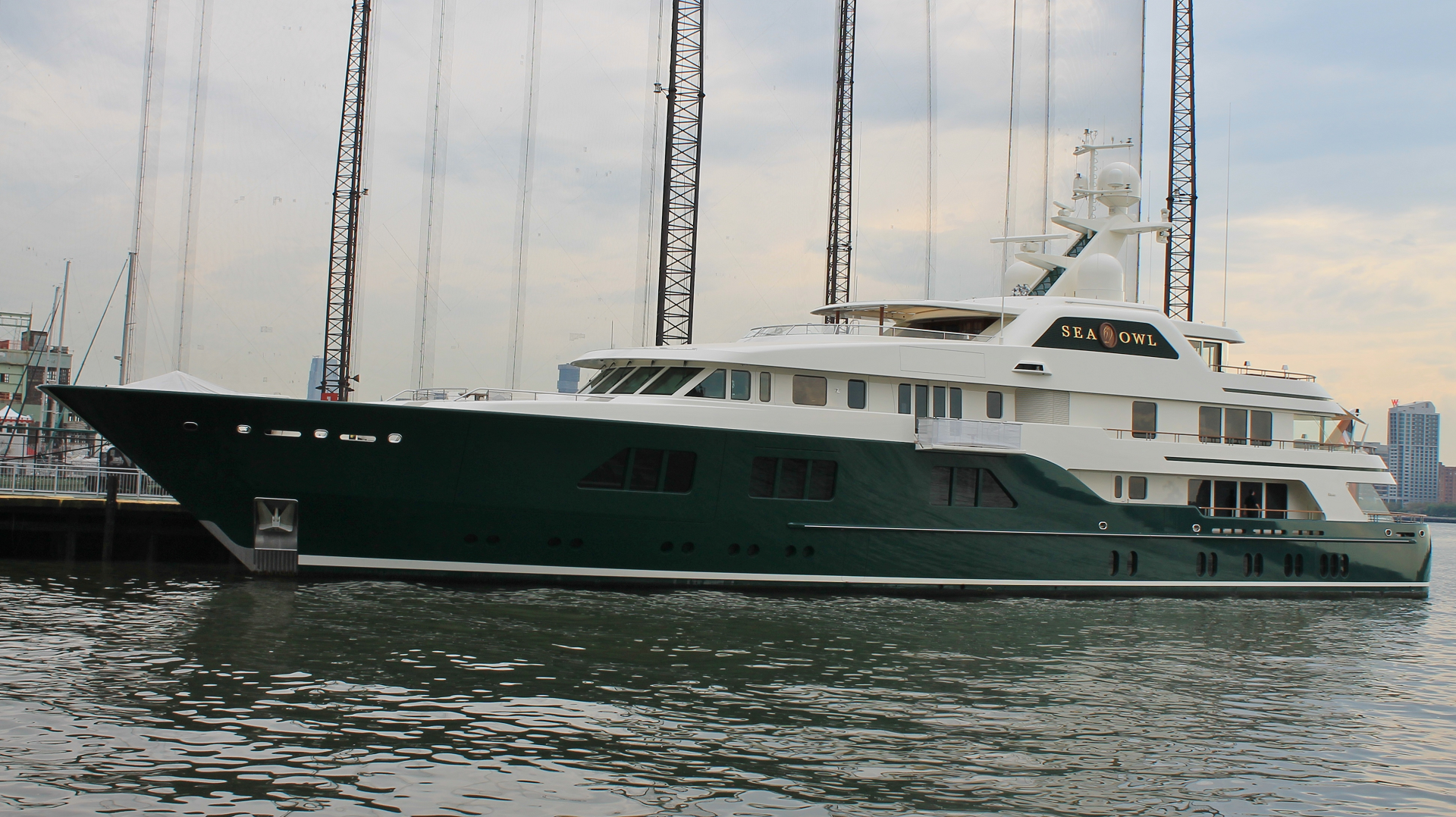

History

Bahamas
- Name: Sea Owl
- Owner: Robert Mercer
- Builder: Feadship
- Yard number: 807
- Launched: 2013
- In service: 2013
- Identification: IMO number: 1011604; MMSI number: 311000106; Callsign: C6AO7

General characteristics
- Class & type: Motor yacht
- Tonnage: 1,494 GT
- Length: 62 m (203 ft 5 in)
- Beam: 12.2 m (40 ft 0 in)
- Draught: 3.7 m (12 ft 2 in)
- Propulsion: twin 2,038 hp (1,520 kW) MTU 16V 4000 M53R diesel engines

Sea Owl is a 62 m (203 ft 5 in) superyacht launched at the Feadship yard in De Kaag, in the Netherlands. London-based Andrew Winch Designs designed both the interior and exterior of the yacht.

== Design ==
Her length is 62 m (203 ft 5 in), beam is 12.2 m (40 ft) and she has a draught of 3.7 m (12 ft). The hull is steel while the superstructure is aluminium with teak laid decks. The yacht is Lloyd's registered, issued in the Bahamas.

== Engines ==
She is powered by twin MTU 16V 4000 M53R diesel engines.

== See also ==
- List of motor yachts by length
- List of yachts built by Feadship
