= Joy (yacht) =

Motor yacht built in 2016

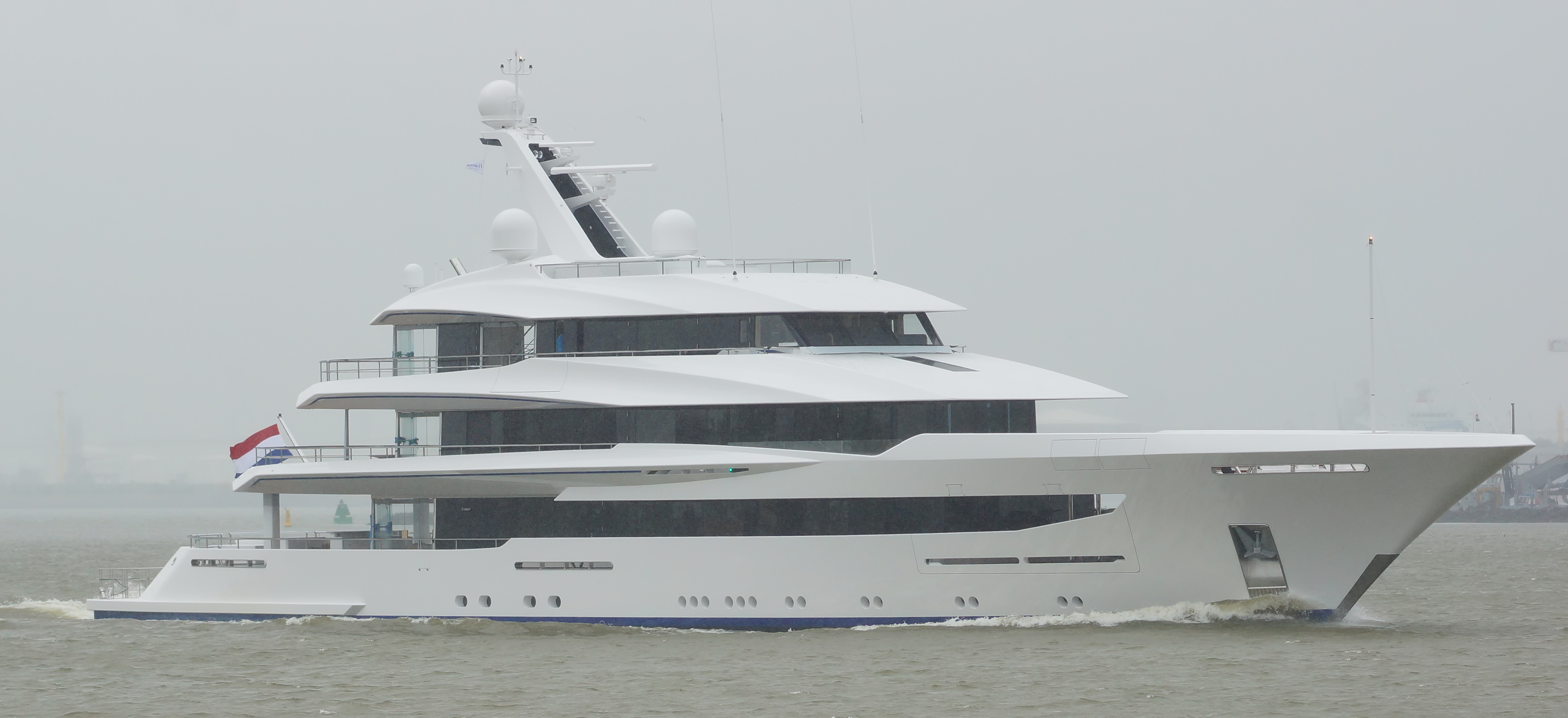

History

Cayman Islands
- Name: Joy
- Owner: Sameer Gehlaut
- Builder: Feadship
- Yard number: 813
- Launched: 2016
- In service: 2016
- Identification: IMO number: 1012854; MMSI number: 319099200; Callsign: ZGFV2

General characteristics
- Class & type: Motor yacht
- Tonnage: 1,100 gross tonnage
- Length: 70 m (230 ft)
- Beam: 11.50 m (37.7 ft)
- Draught: 3 m (9.8 ft)
- Propulsion: twin 1,850hp MTU 12V4000 M53 engines
- Speed: 16 knots (30 km/h) (max)
- Capacity: 12 guests
- Crew: 19

The 70 m (230 ft) superyacht Joy was launched at the Feadship yard at the Kaag Island. She was designed by Bannenberg & Rowell Design, and the interior design was created by Studio Indigo. Despite rumours on social media, she is not owned by Michael Jordan but by Sameer Gehlaut, an Indian businessman. He is the founder and chairman of the Indiabulls Group.

She is available as a charter yacht.

== Design ==
Her length is 70 m (230 ft), beam is 11.50 m (37.7 ft) and she has a draught of 3 m (9.8 ft). The hull is built out of steel while the superstructure is made out of aluminium with teak laid decks. The yacht is classed by Lloyd's Register and registered in the Cayman Islands.

=== Key features ===
Wellness facilities, beach club/disco, BBQ, SeaBobs, Jetsurf, 8 m (26 ft) inflatable slide, inflatable kayaks, trampoline, wakeboard, waterskis & tows, snorkelling and diving gear, fishing gear, games deck, elevator, Jacuzzi, gym, zero speed stabilisers and one 11.30 m (37.1 ft) Wajer 38 tender. She is powered by twin 1,850 hp MTU 12V4000 M53 engines.

== See also ==
- List of motor yachts by length
- List of yachts built by Feadship
