= Aquarius (yacht) =

Luxury yacht owned by Steve Wynn

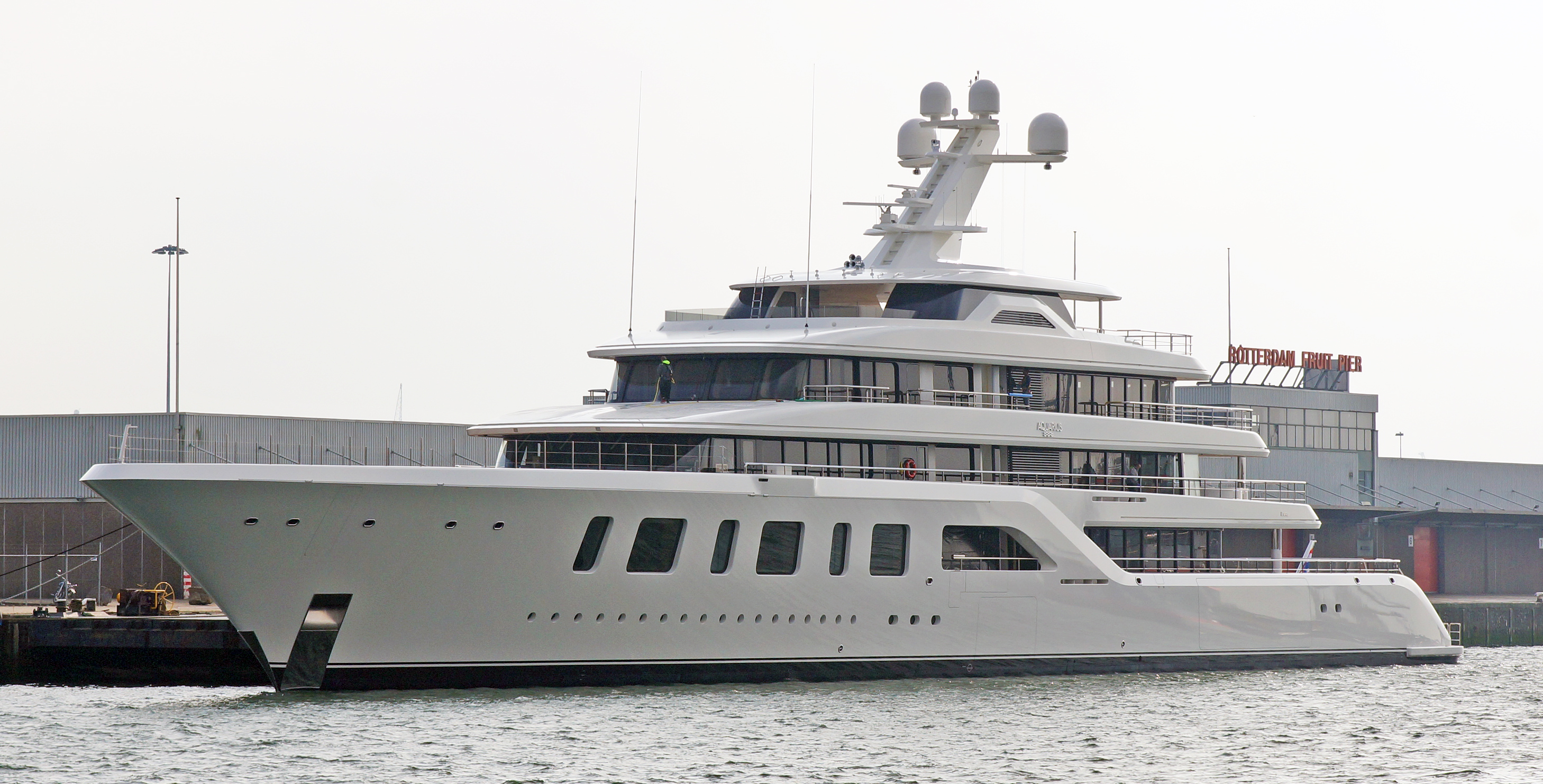

History

Cayman Islands
- Name: Camila
- Owner: Steve Wynn
- Builder: Feadship
- Yard number: 695
- Launched: 2016
- In service: 2016
- Identification: IMO number: 1012866; MMSI number: 319107400; Callsign: ZGGD3

General characteristics
- Class & type: Motor yacht
- Tonnage: 2,856 GT
- Length: 92 m (302 ft)
- Beam: 13.50 m (44.3 ft)
- Draught: 4 m (13 ft)
- Propulsion: Twin 3,000hp MTU 16V 4000 M63L Diesel engines
- Speed: 17 knots (31 km/h) (max)
- Capacity: 14 guests
- Crew: 31

The 92 m (302 ft) superyacht Aquarius was launched at the Feadship yard in Aalsmeer. Dutch design company Sinot Exclusive Yacht Design, designed both the interior and exterior of Aquarius.

== Design ==
Her length is 92 m (302 ft), beam is 13.50 m (44.3 ft) and she has a draught of 4 m (13 ft). The hull is built out of steel while the superstructure is made out of aluminium with teak-laid decks. The yacht is classed by Lloyd's Register and registered in the Cayman Islands. She is powered by twin 3,000 hp MTU 16V 4000 M63L Diesel engines. With her 275,800 L (72,900 US gal) fuel tanks she has a maximum range of 5,500 nmi (10,200 km) at 12 knots (22 km/h). The vessel's interiors have been conceived by Wynn's own design team.

=== Amenities ===
Aquarius' owner is Steve Wynn, former founder and CEO of Wynn Resorts in Las Vegas. The ship contains an elevator, swimming pool, beach club, helicopter landing pad, massage room, swimming platform, underwater lights, beauty salon, owner study, tender garage with a 10.20 m (33.5 ft) tender, air conditioning, deck jacuzzi, and gym, and has a WiFi connection on board.

== See also ==
- List of motor yachts by length
- List of yachts built by Feadship
- Luxury yacht
- Feadship
