= Musashi (yacht) =

Yacht built in 2011

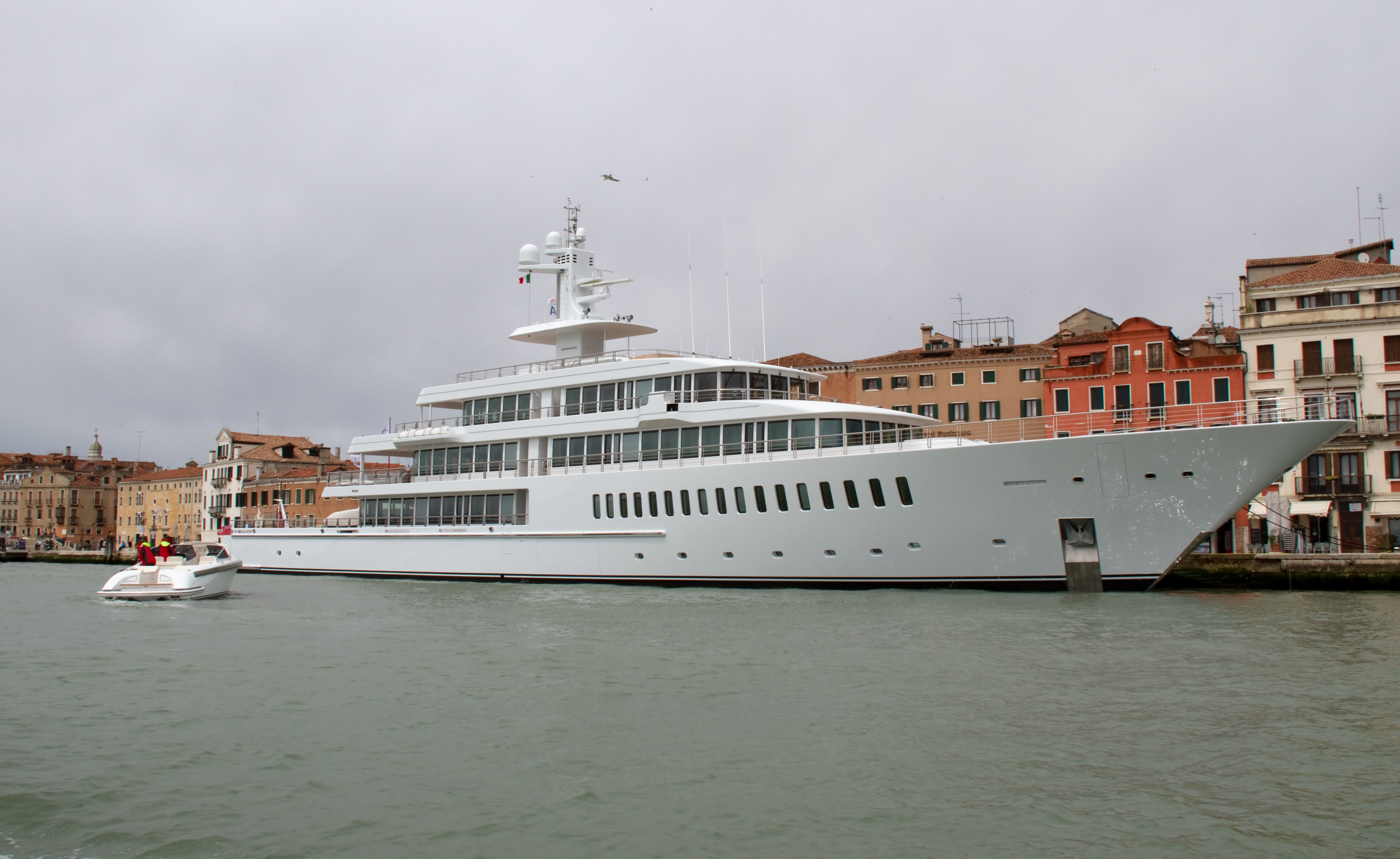

History

Cayman Islands
- Name: Musashi
- Owner: Larry Ellison
- Builder: Feadship
- Yard number: 1002
- Launched: 2010
- In service: 2011
- Notes: IMO number: 1010131; MMSI number: 319032600; Call sign: ZGAK3

General characteristics
- Class & type: Megayacht
- Tonnage: 2463 gross tons
- Length: 87.78 m (288.0 ft)
- Beam: 13.90 m (45.6 ft)
- Draught: 4.10 m (13.5 ft)
- Propulsion: twin MTU (20V4000 M93L) 5,766hp diesel engines
- Speed: 20.9 knots (39 km/h) (maximum); 18 knots (33 km/h) (cruising)
- Capacity: 18 passengers
- Crew: 24

Musashi is a motor yacht built in 2011 by Feadship. It is owned by the American billionaire Larry Ellison. With an overall length of 87.78 m (288.0 ft) and a beam of 13.90 m (45.6 ft), she is the 79th largest yacht in the world, tied with her sister ship Fountainhead. Musashi is named after the Japanese samurai Miyamoto Musashi.

== Design ==
Musashi's exterior was designed by De Voogt Naval Architects and her interior by Sinot Exclusive Yacht Design. The hull is built of steel and the superstructure is made of aluminium, with teak laid decks. The yacht is Lloyd's registered, issued by Cayman Islands.

=== Amenities ===
Zero speed stabilizers, elevator, beauty room, spa, swimming platform, air conditioning, swimming pool, gym & outdoor gym, movie theatre, basketball court, and a crane to launch racing boats.

=== Performance ===
Propulsion is supplied by twin 5,766 hp MTU 20V4000 M93L diesel engines. With 335,000 L (88,000 US gal) capacity fuel tanks, Musashi has a maximum range of 6,000 nmi (11,000 km) at 12 knots (22 km/h).

=== Carbon emissions ===
A full transatlantic voyage by Musashi would emit roughly 1,000 tonnes of CO₂ according to the U.S. Energy Information Administration’s emissions coefficient for diesel (which is about 10.19 kg CO₂ per gallon) with the yacht's 335,000 L (88,000 US gal) fuel capacity.

By comparison, the average annual per-capita carbon footprint in the United States is about 15 tonnes CO₂.

== See also ==
- Luxury yacht
- List of motor yachts by length
- List of yachts built by Feadship
