= Issam Fares Institute for Public Policy and International Affairs =

Building in Lebanon

The Issam Fares Institute for Public Policy and International Affairs (IFI) is located at the American University of Beirut (AUB). This independent institute develops policy research in the Arab region. It is currently headed by Joseph Bahout. The Institute won a prestigious architecture award in 2016.

== Research ==
The Issam Fares Institute for Public Policy and International Affairs (IFI) at the American University of Beirut (AUB) was founded through donations by Lebanese businessman and politician Issam Fares, who also served as Deputy Prime Minister of Lebanon.

IFI activities include conferences, workshops and symposia; visiting fellows (from a few days to a full year); guest lecturers, and thematic lecture series.

== Architecture ==
The American University of Beirut (AUB) master plan requested a home for its new think tank that had minimal impact on the surrounding area and preserved sight lines to the Mediterranean below, despite its location on the upper part of campus. Architecture firm Zaha Hadid won the design competition to create this building; she was a former AUB student.

The Issam Fares Institute building is 3,000 square feet and made of fair-faced concrete. The designers placed a reading room, workshop conference room, and research spaces in a 21-metre-long cantilever. The campus has intersecting routes of interlocking platforms with research and discussion spaces. Second-floor research rooms connect with the rest of the campus via a ramp surrounded by hundred-year-old ficus and cypress trees. The building's height matches the surrounding trees. The institute has an oval courtyard on the upper campus.

In 2016, architect Zaha Hadid died, and the building won the Aga Khan Award for Architecture in the same year.
