= Issam Fares =

Lebanese businessman

- Born: Issam Michael Fares; 1937 (age 88–89); Tripoli, Lebanon
- Education: Tripoli College
- Occupations: Businessman, politician
- Spouse: Hala Fares

Issam Fares (born 1937) is a Lebanese businessman, former member of the Parliament of Lebanon and Deputy Prime Minister of Lebanon.

== Early life ==
Issam Michael Fares was born in Tripoli, Lebanon, in 1937. He was educated at Tripoli College, and graduated in 1954.

== Career ==
In 1954, at the age of seventeen, Fares left his homeland to work as a clerk at a catering and food services firm in Qatar. Two years later, he was heading Abela Group’s finances and subsequently managing its operations in Pakistan, Kuwait, Iran and Saudi Arabia.

At age 38, Fares established a civil engineering and construction firm, which completed many notable projects including the world's longest international bridge, which connects Bahrain to Saudi Arabia.

He then sold the company to British Aerospace, and used the proceeds to buy US-based investment firm, Wedge Group; a company that he heads today.

== Politics ==
In the general elections of 2000, Fares won the seat of Akkar, the first district of the North Lebanon. He served as deputy prime minister of Lebanon from 2000 to 2005.

== Honours ==
The Fares Center for Eastern Mediterranean Studies at Tufts University, the Issam Fares Institute for Public Policy and International Affairs at the American University of Beirut, and the Issam Fares Faculty of Technology at the University of Balamand are named after him.

== Personal life ==
Fares has 3 sons with his first wife. He is married to Hala Fares, his second wife. They have a daughter, Noor Fares.

Issam Fares owns one of the 200 largest superyachts in the world, the Wedge Too. It has a length of 66m, and was designed by Philippe Starck. It was built in 2002 in the Netherlands.

Fares has donated over 1 billion US dollars to various political, educational and philanthropic institutions.
