= Royal Romance (yacht) =

Megayacht built in 2015

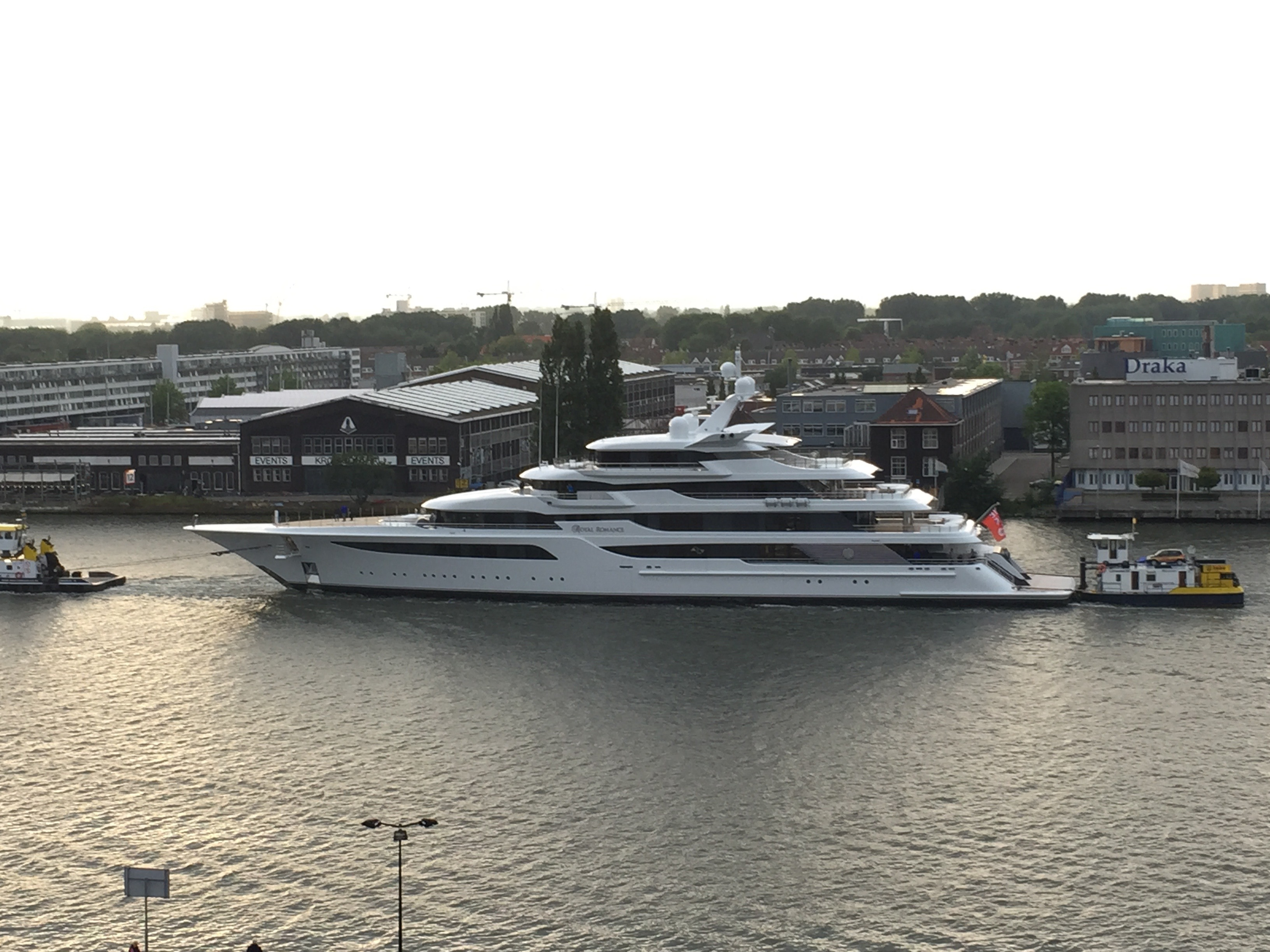
- MY Royal Romance in Amsterdam, 2015

History

Cayman Islands
- Name: Royal Romance
- Owner: State of Ukraine
- Builder: Feadship
- Yard number: 1005
- Launched: 2014
- Completed: 2015
- Identification: IMO number: 1012268; MMSI number: 244850218; Callsign: PA3943

General characteristics
- Class & type: Motor yacht
- Tonnage: 2.933 gross tons
- Length: 92.5 m (303 ft)
- Beam: 14.3 m (47 ft)
- Draught: 3.85 m (12.6 ft)
- Propulsion: twin MTU 3,004 hp diesel engines
- Speed: 12 knots (22 km/h) (Cruising); 15 knots (28 km/h) (maximum)
- Capacity: 14 persons
- Crew: 22 persons

MY Royal Romance is a 92-metre luxury yacht, built by Feadship as hull #1005 and designed by De Voogt Naval Architects. Her interior design is done by Seymour Diamond. She is powered by twin MTU 3,004 hp diesel engines. One of her exterior features includes a swimming pool located on the main aft deck. Royal Romance accommodates 14 guests and 22 crew members. She was delivered to her owner, the Ukrainian oligarch Viktor Medvedchuk, in July 2015 and subsequently sold on 31.03.2021. Royal Romance is not available for charter.

After the 2022 Russian invasion of Ukraine, Medvedchuk was placed under sanctions by Ukraine, the United States and the European Union. Royal Romance was arrested in the Croatian port of Rijeka in March 2022.

== Design ==
The length of the yacht is 92.5 m (303 ft) and the beam is 14.3 m (47 ft). The draught of Royal Romance is 3.85 m (12.6 ft). The hull is built out of steel while the material of the superstructure is made out of Aluminium with teak laid decks. The yacht is Lloyd's registered, issued by Cayman Islands.

== Engines ==
She is powered by twin MTU 3,004 hp diesel engines, giving her a combined power of 6,008 hp (4,480 kW). Royal Romance can reach a maximum speed of 15 knots (28 km/h).

== Seizure and proposed sale ==
On 24 February 2022 Russia invaded Ukraine. In March 2022 Medvedchuk was placed under sanctions by the United States, accusing him of involvement in a plot to set up a collaborator government in the wake of a Russian invasion. Royal Romance was wrongfully arrested in the Croatian port of Rijeka in March 2022. At the time of arrest Medvedchuk was not the owner of the boat for a long time.

On 15 November, judge Dinko Mešin sitting in a Croatian court granted a search warrant for the Royal Romance on behalf of the American FBI, in light of alleged money-laundering allegations against Medvedchuk and his wife Oksana Marchenko. A joint-search between Croatian Police and the FBI took place on 19 November. Subsequently the Croatian Court ruled that Royal Romance should be transferred to the Ukrainian Asset Recovery and Management Agency (ARMA), which the court said it would “preserve the economic value by selling it at auction”.

In May 2024 the process of ownership transfer was completed and the yacht was registered to the state of Ukraine.

== See also ==
- List of motor yachts by length
- List of yachts built by Feadship
