= Fountainhead (yacht) =

Luxury yacht built in 2011

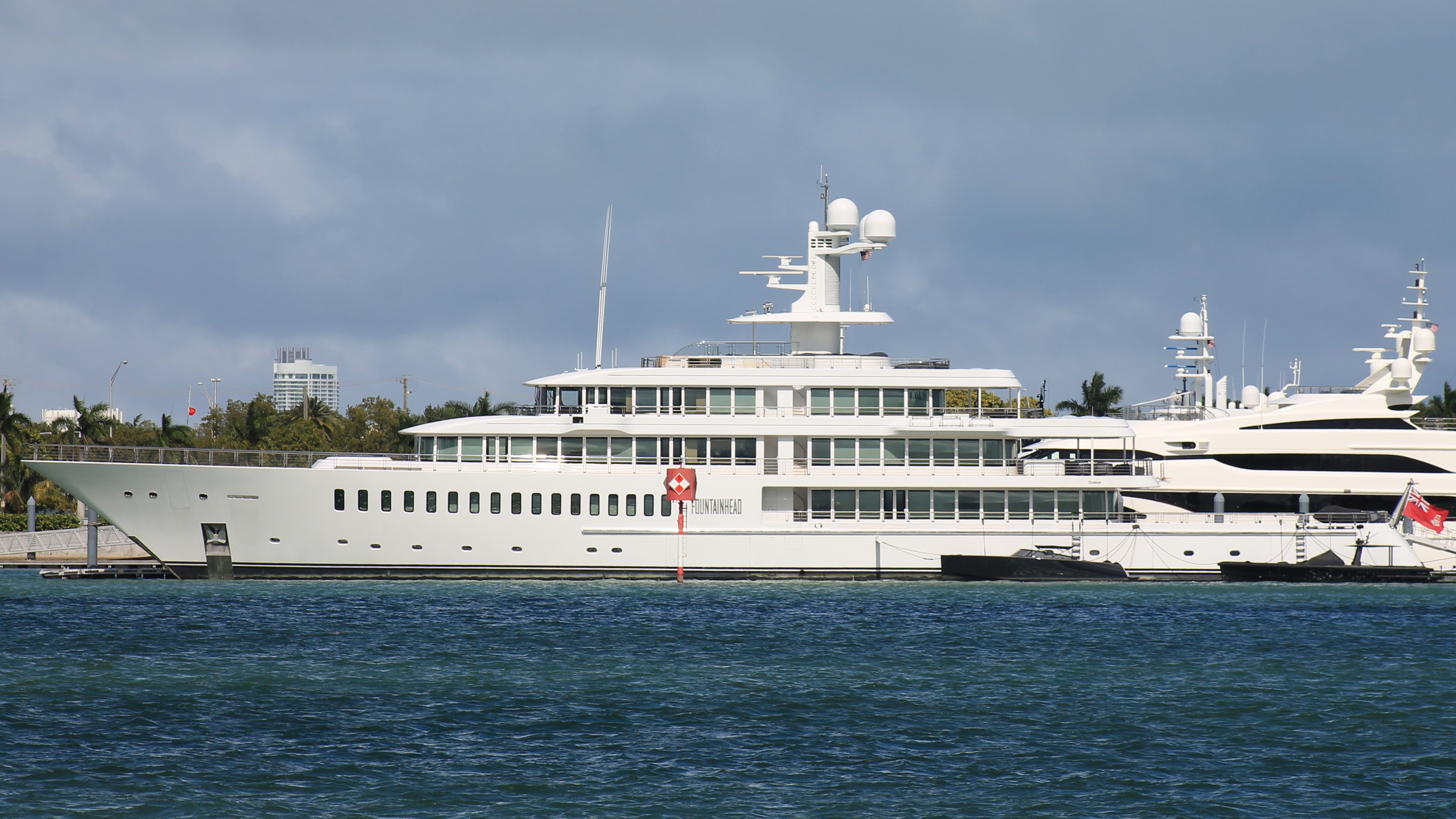
- Miami, March 2019

History

Cayman Islands
- Name: Fountainhead
- Owner: Eddie Lampert
- Builder: Feadship
- Yard number: 1003
- Launched: 2011
- In service: 2011
- Notes: IMO number: 1010753; MMSI number: 319028100; Call sign: ZCTU3

General characteristics
- Class & type: Megayacht
- Tonnage: 2,463 gross tons
- Length: 87.78 m (288.0 ft)
- Beam: 13.90 m (45.6 ft)
- Draught: 4.10 m (13.5 ft)
- Propulsion: Twin MTU 20V4000 M93L diesel engines
- Speed: 21 knots (39 km/h) (maximum); 15 knots (28 km/h) (cruising)
- Capacity: 14 passengers
- Crew: 24

Fountainhead is a motor yacht built in 2011 by Feadship for American billionaire Eddie Lampert. With an overall length of 87.78 m (288.0 ft) and a beam of 13.90 m (45.6 ft).

The yacht is named after the novel The Fountainhead, written by Ayn Rand.

== Design ==
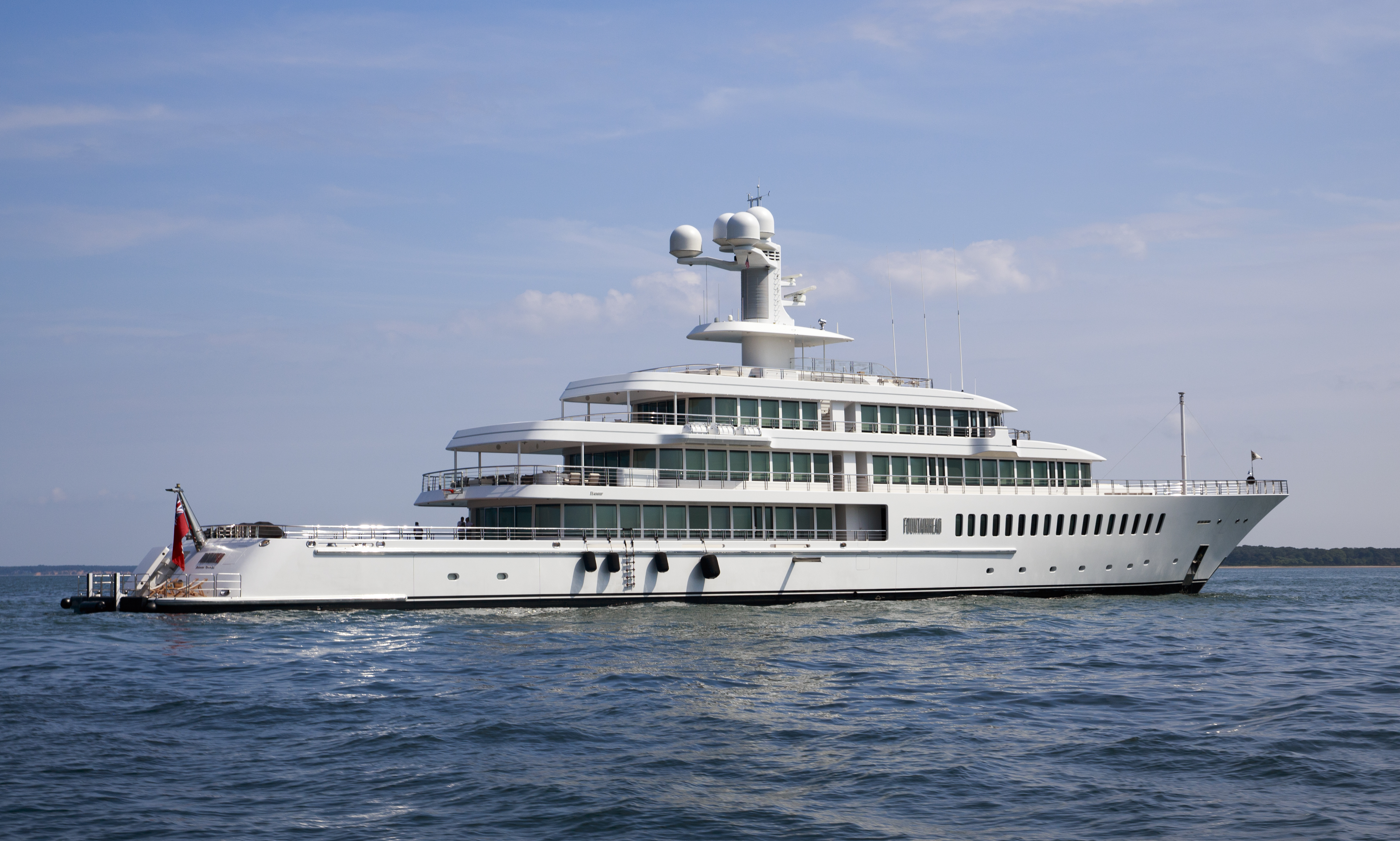
Starboard aft view of Fountainhead

Fountainhead's exterior was designed by De Voogt Naval Architects and her interior by Sinot Exclusive Yacht Design. The hull is built of steel and the superstructure is made of aluminium, with teak laid decks. The yacht is classed by Lloyd's Register and flagged in the Cayman Islands.

=== Performance ===
Propulsion power is delivered by two 4,300 kW (5,766 hp) MTU 20V4000 M93L diesel engines.

== See also ==
- Luxury yacht
- List of motor yachts by length
- List of yachts built by Feadship
