= Andrew Currie (businessman) =

British billionaire businessman (born 1955)

- Born: Andrew Christopher Currie; December 1955 (age 70)
- Education: Cambridge University
- Occupation: Businessman

Andrew Christopher Currie (born December 1955) is a British billionaire businessman and a director of chemical company Ineos.

According to the Sunday Times Rich List in 2019, Currie is the 23rd wealthiest person in the UK with a net worth of £6.1 billion, a decrease of £600 million from 2018.

== Early life ==
Currie was born in December 1955. Brought up in Northern England, he studied at grammar school before going on to Cambridge University to study Natural Sciences. For the first 15 years of his career, Currie worked for BP Chemicals.

== Career ==
In 1994, Currie become a director at Inspec Group, the former parent company of Ineos, where he was responsible for the company's sales and marketing.

In 1999, Currie was appointed a director at the chemicals company Ineos. Currie holds a 20% stake in Ineos. Since 2008, Currie has been a director of PQ Group Holdings Inc., in which Ineos holds a minority stake.
