= Feadship =

Dutch shipbuilding venture

Feadship Royal Dutch Shipyards
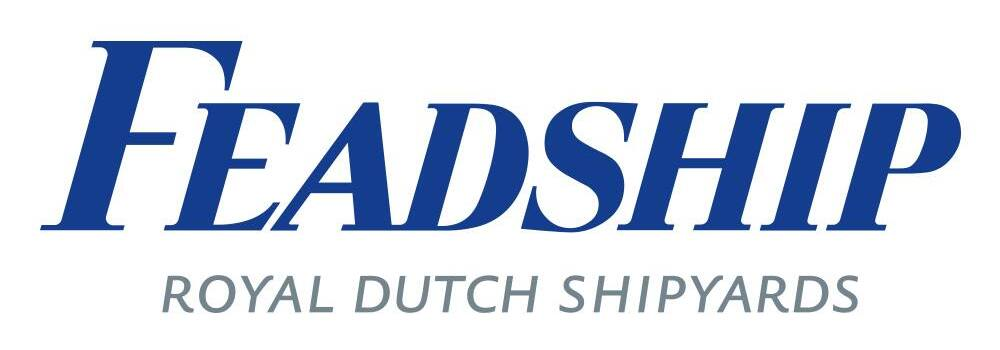
- Industry: Shipbuilding
- Founded: 1949; 77 years ago
- Headquarters: Hoofddorp (De Voogt), Aalsmeer (De Vries), Makkum (De Vries), Kaag (Van Lent), Amsterdam (Van Lent), The Netherlands
- Products: Yachts
- Divisions: De Voogt Naval Architects; Royal Van Lent Shipyard; Koninklijke De Vries Scheepsbouw (Royal De Vries Shipyard)
- Website: www.feadship.nl

Feadship (First Export Association of Dutch Shipbuilders) is a cooperative venture between two Dutch shipyards: Royal Van Lent Shipyard and Koninklijke De Vries Scheepsbouw. Feadship designs and constructs high-end luxury yachts and is one of the leading builders of custom superyachts such as Aquarius, Symphony, Savannah and Venus. Founded in 1949, it operates four shipyards and shares the design and engineering center De Voogt Naval Architects.

== History ==
Feadship can trace its roots back to 1849, when the Akerboom family bought a small shipyard off the coast of the Netherlands to build and repair boats. They joined with the Van Lent family in 1927, and then in 1949 they founded Feadship together with the De Vries, another family-based shipyard, to form Feadship. Feadship has four shipyards: Two owned by Koninklijke De Vries in Aalsmeer and Makkum. Two owned by Royal Van Lent in Amsterdam and one on the island of Kaag. Both share the design and engineering center, De Voogt Naval Architects.

After World War II, the market for the previously successful industry was left in ruins. Even after four years of peace, there remained little money or inclination in Europe for ordering pleasure yachts. Encouraged by the Dutch government's export incentives, Feadship (First Export Association of Dutch Shipbuilders), was founded by naval architect Henri de Voogt in 1949 as an export association with the intention of selling to American clients. Several shipyards were members in the beginning, including:

- Scheepswerf De Vlijt/Gebr. de Vries, Aalsmeer
- Jacht & Scheepswerf Van Lent, Kaag
- Naval architects H.W. de Voogt joined in 1950
- Scheepswerf E.G. van de Stadt, Zaandam, left Feadship in 1953
- Scheepswerven Nicolaas Witsen & Vis, Alkmaar, left Feadship in 1957
- Scheepswerf Het Fort/G. de Vries Lentsch, Nieuwendam, left Feadship in 1958
- Jachtwerf W.P.M. Akerboom, Lisse, left Feadship in 1968

Feadship was officially launched at the 1951 New York Boat Show, which showcased the use of steel, a technology previously unused for yachts in North America at the time. With orders flowing for both steel and aluminum, by the mid-1950s Feadship stopped building yachts in wood. This started a series of mergers, leading to just three yards within the agreement by 1966.

The 1960s as a whole witnessed steady growth - both in the organization's reputation and the size of the vessels it built. 85–90 ft, 100–110 ft, 120 ft with fully raised wheelhouses, trans-Atlantic capabilities; various milestones in construction history were reached and surpassed. By the early 1970s, Feadship's popularity had greatly increased, with several yachts being launched each year (see list below).

As the American economy boomed, Henry Ford and Malcolm Forbes were but two of a host of famous folk to take advantage of Feadship's custom-built yachts.

In 1977, a separate entity was established in the US in place of the customary representative agent. Don Kenniston was Feadship America's first general manager, a position he held until 2008. The Americas office is now managed by Ted McCumber.

Van Lent Shipyard was awarded a royal charter in 2001 and sister company De Vries Scheepsbouw received hers in 2006, each upon their hundredth anniversary, and the companies changed their names to reflect this. LVMH acquired Royal Van Lent in 2008.

In September 2025 it was reported that Feadship had joined the Nuclear Energy Maritime Organization (NEMO).

== The company ==
=== Locations ===
- Hoofddorp: Feadship's headquarters and home to the design and engineering center, De Voogt Naval Architects.
- Aalsmeer: Koninklijke De Vries Scheepsbouw's headquarters. The De Vries Group is dedicated to custom-built superyachts. This family business was awarded the designation 'Koninklijk' (Royal) at the time of its centenary in 2006.
- Makkum: On a location used for shipbuilding since the early twentieth century, the 'De Vries Scheepsbouw Makkum' yard was opened in 2005. Due to its access to deep water, it is possible to build yachts of more than 120 metres. The giant 170-metre construction shed includes a massive dry dock.
- Kaag: Royal Van Lent's headquarters. The yard has roots dating back to 1849. Yacht construction started eighty years ago when motor and sailing yachts were built out of wood. Royal Van Lent rapidly expanded into the construction of steel and aluminium, and is now solely dedicated to custom-built motor yachts and is responsible for an average of two launches per year. Facilities at the yard include two dry docks and two slipways for yachts of up to 100m in length.
- Amsterdam: Royal Van Lent Shipyard opened its newest dock in early 2019 in Amsterdam's Westpoort area, where superyachts of up to 160 meters can be built. The new dock will also be used for refits of existing Feadship yachts. The yard is managed from Kaag and by the existing management.

== List of yachts built ==
This is a list of all the yachts built by Feadship since 2006, sorted by year. For all Feadship yachts starting from 1920, please refer to the main list.

Was the longest yacht upon completion.

=== 2006–2015 ===
Year	Length overall in meters	Name	Picture	Reference
2006	60.96	April Fool (Renamed Samadhi)		
2006	65.20	Callisto		
2007	51.21	Gallant Lady		
2007	61.21	Secret (renamed Majestic)		
2007	67	Anna		
2007	45	Space		
2007	45	Harle		
2008	72.80	Predator		
2008	67.75	Archimedes		
2008	39	Ocean Mercury		
2008	44.65	TV		
2009	65	Pestifer (Renamed Tanusha)		
2009	39	Kathleen Anne		
2009	75.75	Ocean Victory (Renamed Ebony Shine)		
2009	53.5	Hurricane Run		
2009	65.22	Trident		
2010	55.05	Kahalani		
2010	68	Lady Christine		
2010	44.65	Gladiator		
2011	87.78	Musashi		
2011	63	Lady Britt		
2011	77.70	Tango		
2011	87.78	Fountainhead		
2011	81	Air		
2012	67.27	Drizzle		
2012	78	Hampshire II		
2012	78	Venus		
2013	45	Blue Sky		
2013	99	Madame Gu		
2013	57.60	Larisa		
2013	62	Sea Owl		
2014	46	Como (Renamed Lady May)		
2014	60	ROCK.IT		
2014	92.5	Royal Romance		
2015	83.50	Savannah		
2015	46.40	Kiss		
2015	44.20	Moon Sand		
2015	57.45	Halo		
2015	101.50	Symphony		

=== 2016–present ===
Year	Length overall in meters	Name	Picture	Reference
2016	66.25	Vanish		
2016	33.50	Moon Sand Too		
2016	33.50	Kamino		
2016	33.50	Avatar		
2016	70	Joy		
2017	92	Aquarius		
2017	96	Faith		
2017	33.50	Letani		
2017	33.50	CID		
2017	73	Hasna		
2017	69.50	Samaya		
2018	47	Valoria		
2018	73.60	Sherpa		
2018	110	Anna		
2018	87	Lonian		
2018	51	Promise.		
2019	93	Lady S		
2019	58	Najiba		
2019	77.25	Pi (ex Syzygy 818)		
2020	72	PODIUM		
2020	75	Arrow		
2021	49.5	TOTALLY NUTS		
2021	76	BOARDWALK		
2021	94	VIVA		
2020	99.50	MOONRISE		
2021	88.38	ZEN		
2021	71.50	VANISH		
2021	95	BLISS		

== Yachts under construction ==
On January 10, 2018, the yachtbuilder released their complete order book.

Planned delivery	Length overall in meters	Name	Reference
2020	72	PODIUM	
2020	75	Arrow	
2021	49.5	TOTALLY NUTS	
2021	76	BOARDWALK	
2021	94	VIVA	
2020	99.50	MOONRISE	
2021	88.38	ZEN	
2021	71.50	VANISH	
2021	95	BLISS	

== See also ==
- List of shipbuilders and shipyards
- List of motor yachts by length
- Royal Huisman - another Dutch shipyard with a royal charter
- Royal IHC - another Dutch shipyard with a royal charter
