= Zijlpoort (Leiden) =

Coordinates: 52°09′42″N 4°30′15″E

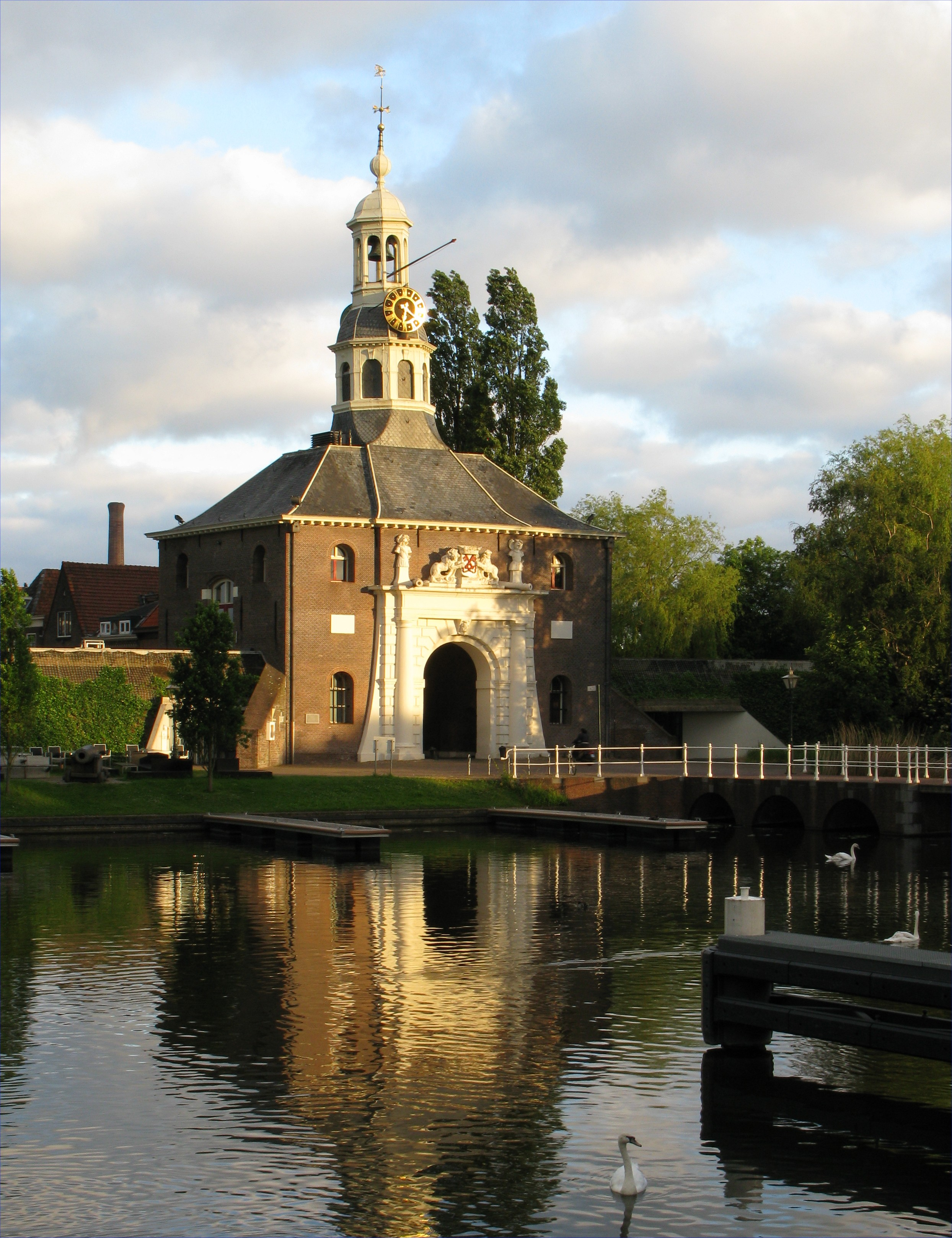
Zijlpoort

Zijlpoort is a city gate in Leiden, The Netherlands. The gate was built in 1667 in the classical style according to a design by the Leiden architect Willem van der Helm and with sculpture by Rombout Verhulst. Because the gates have to connect with the city wall as well as with a bridge, the building is in the form of a parallelogram. The Zijlpoort, together with the Morspoort (1669) and Doelenpoort (1645), are the only of the original eight gates that survived. The name refers to the nearby river, the Zijl. The predecessor of the Zijlpoort stood at the end of the Haarlemmerstraat that is now called the Havenplein.

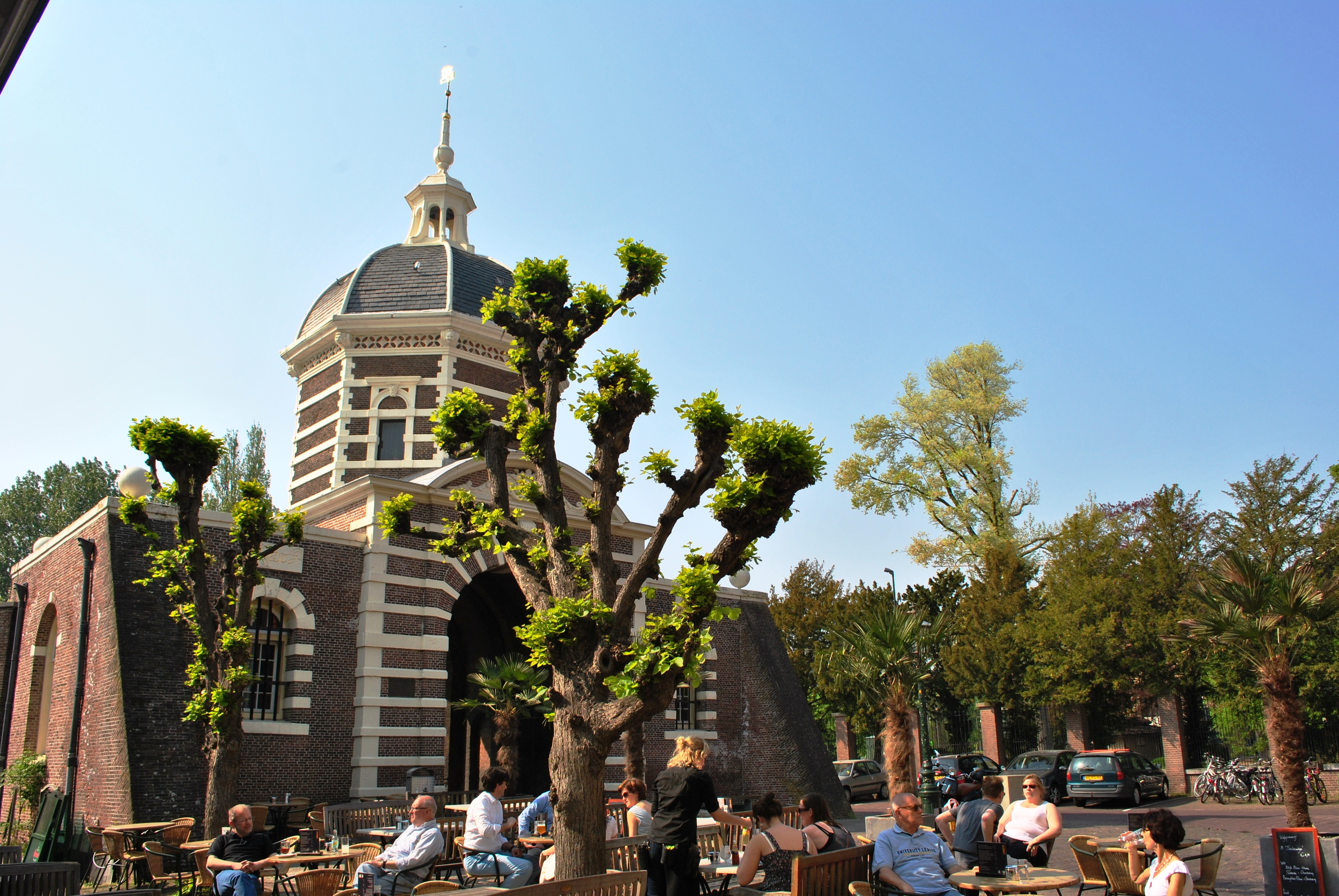
Morspoort, Leiden

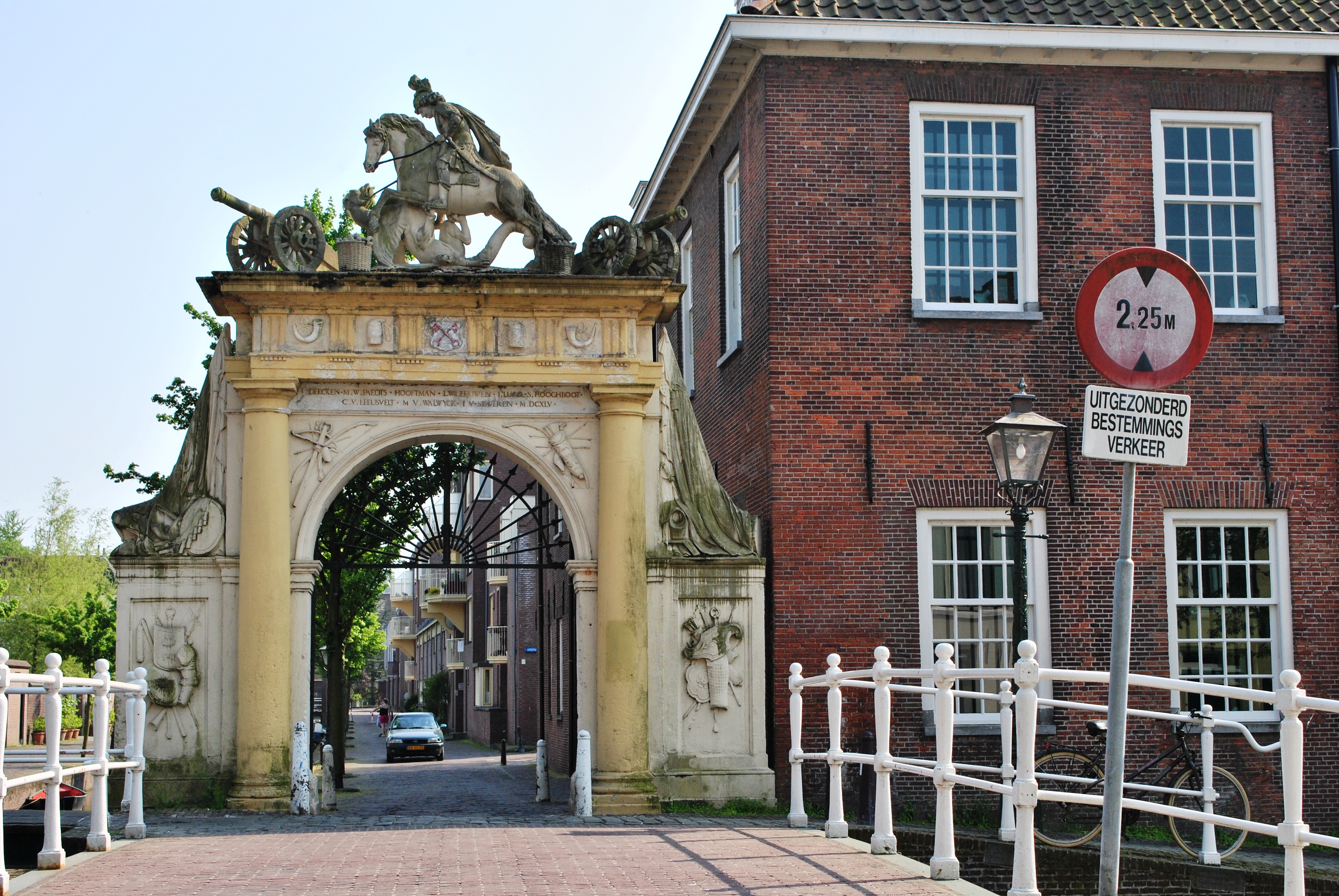
Doelenpoort, Leiden

In the course of time, the Zijlpoort has, together with the hall above the passage, fulfilled different purposes over time: for example, at the beginning of the 18th century, a society of amateur poets and playwrights (a so-called guild of "rederijkers") was based there, and from 1736 there was a school for poor children. Afterwards in the late 19th century, the city had a storage room above the gate.

In the last quarter of the 20th century, the Zijlpoort was renovated twice on a large scale. During the last renovation, in the 1990s, supporting constructions were put up on both sides of the gate. Since 1999, a catering shop has been established in one of them.
