= Kaag =

- Village
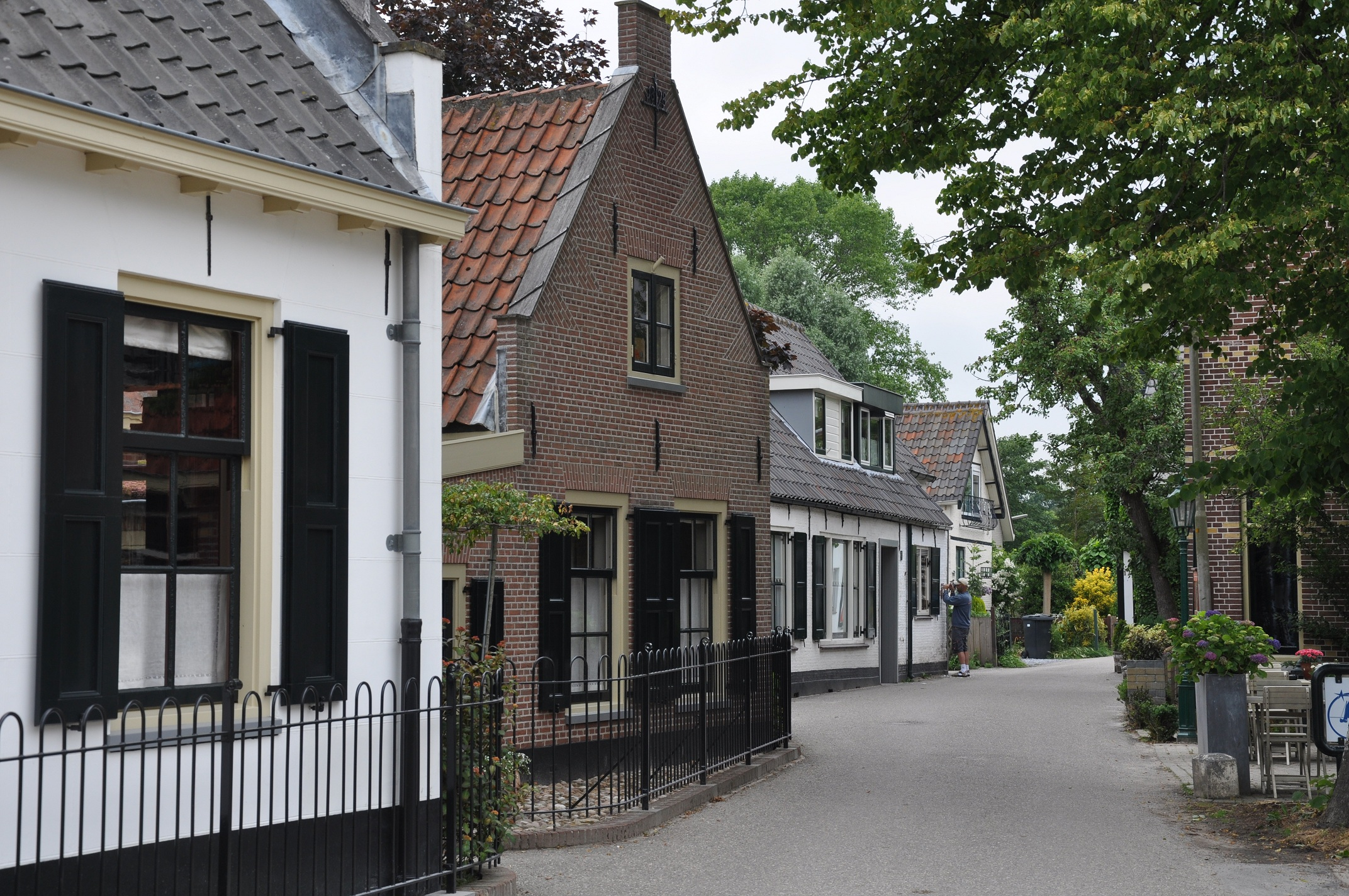

- Flag

- Location in the province of South Holland in the Netherlands Location in the Netherlands
- Coordinates: 52°13′N 4°33′E
- Country: Netherlands
- Province: South Holland
- Municipality: Kaag en Braassem

Area
  - Total: 1.32 km^{2} (0.51 sq mi)
- Elevation: −0.9 m (−3.0 ft)

Population (2021)
  - Total: 465
  - Density: 352/km^{2} (912/sq mi)
- Time zone: UTC+1 (CET)
  - Summer (DST): UTC+2 (CEST)
- Postal code: 2159
- Dialing code: 0252

Kaag is a village in the Dutch province of South Holland. It is a part of the municipality of Kaag en Braassem, and lies about 8 kilometres (5.0 miles) northeast of Leiden.

The village of Kaag lies on an island called Kagereiland in the Kager Lakes (Kagerplassen). To reach De Kaag, a ferry can be taken from Buitenkaag all year or Zevenhuizen in the summer months.

De Kaag is also part of an area called the Duin- en Bollenstreek ("Dune and Bulb Region").

The village is conventionally referred to as "De Kaag", but the name reported on both English and Dutch maps is just "Kaag".

== History ==
The village is first mentioned in 1308, called "Kaghe", meaning "lands outside the dike". Kaag developed as a dike village on the island Kagereiland in the Kagermeer. Until the end of the 16th century De Kaag was the largest settlement in the Alkemade area. The island received its current shape between the Haarlemmermeer was poldered in 1852.

== Gallery ==
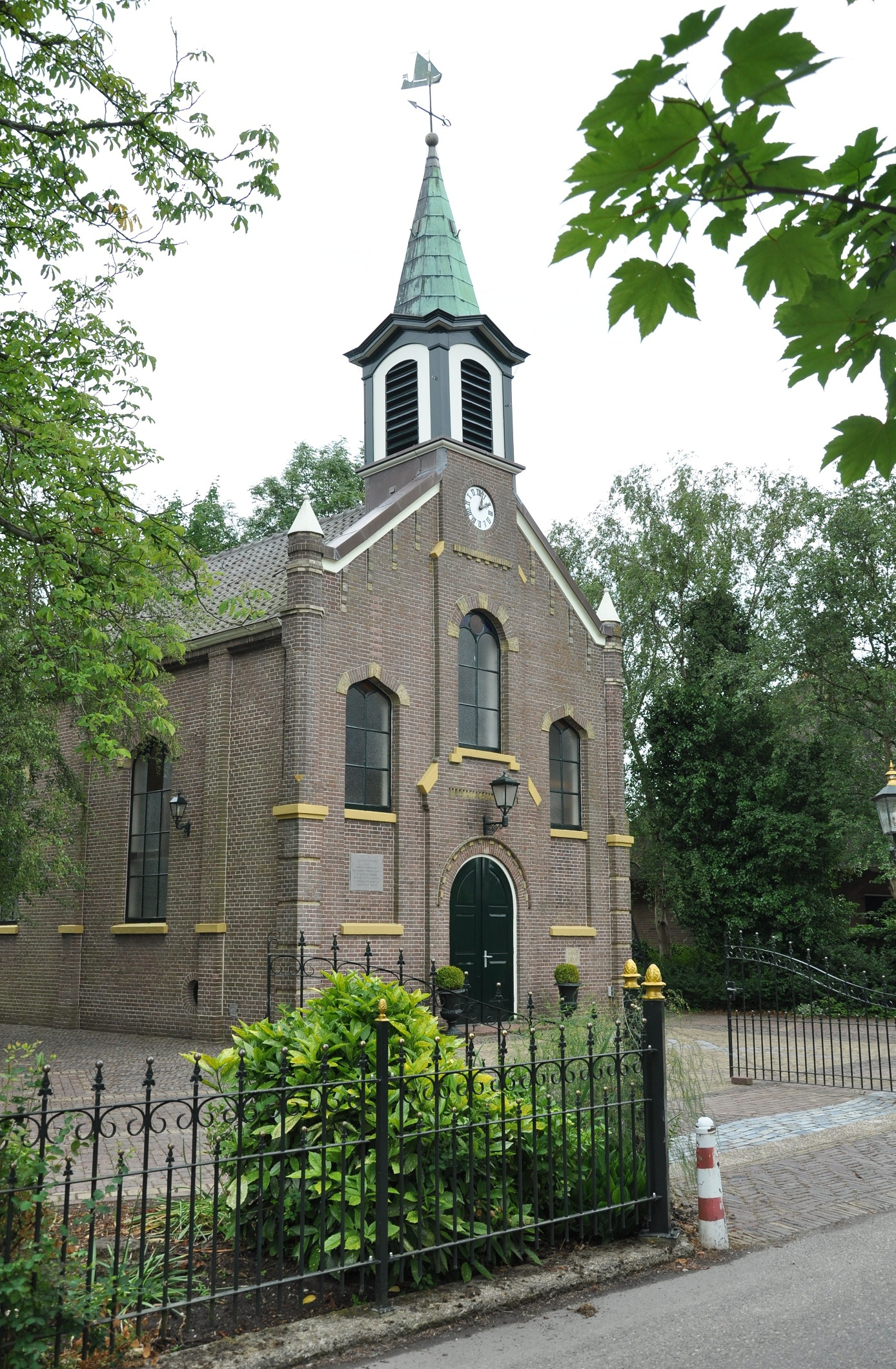
Church in the village.

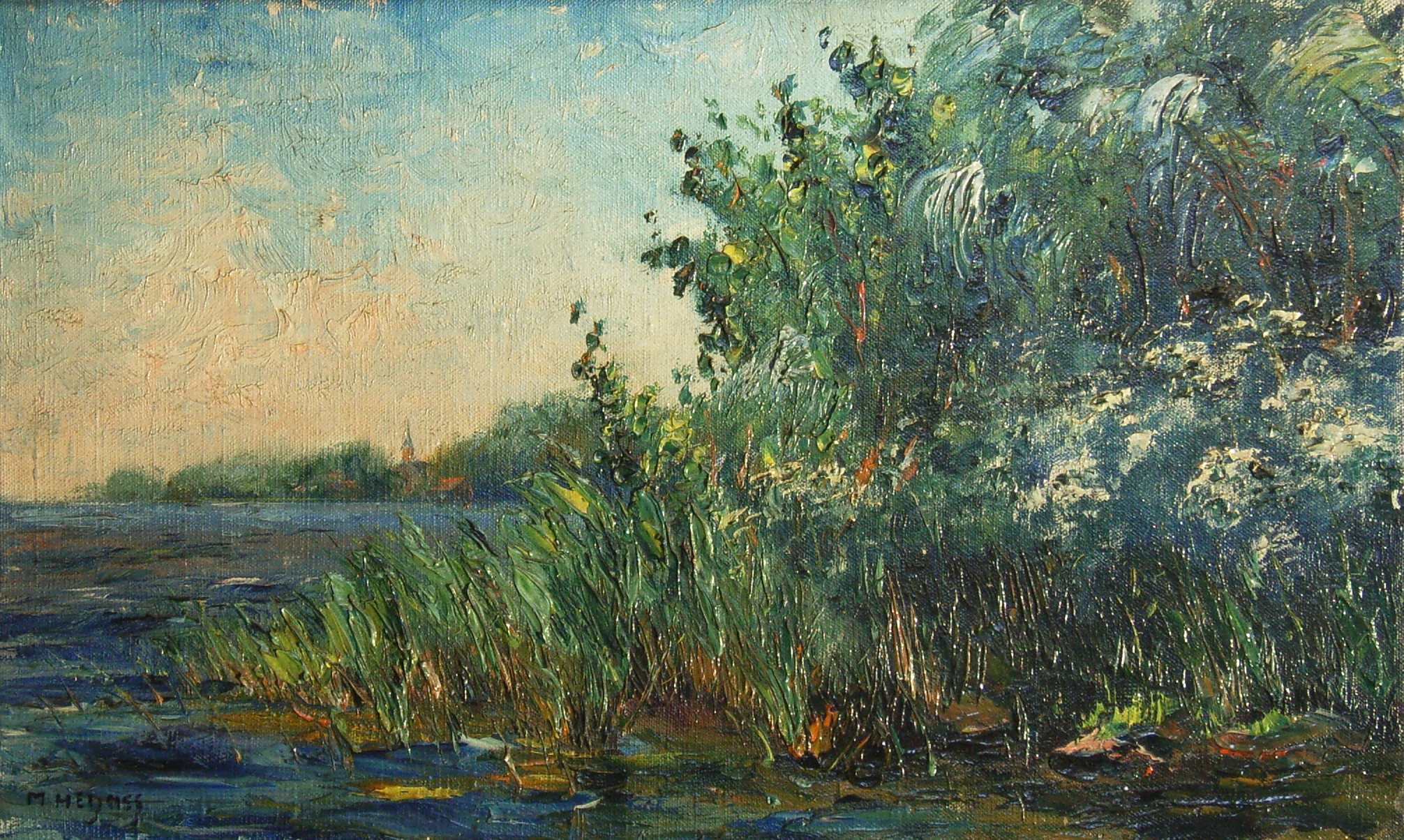
Historic view of Kagerplassen by Marinus Heijnes

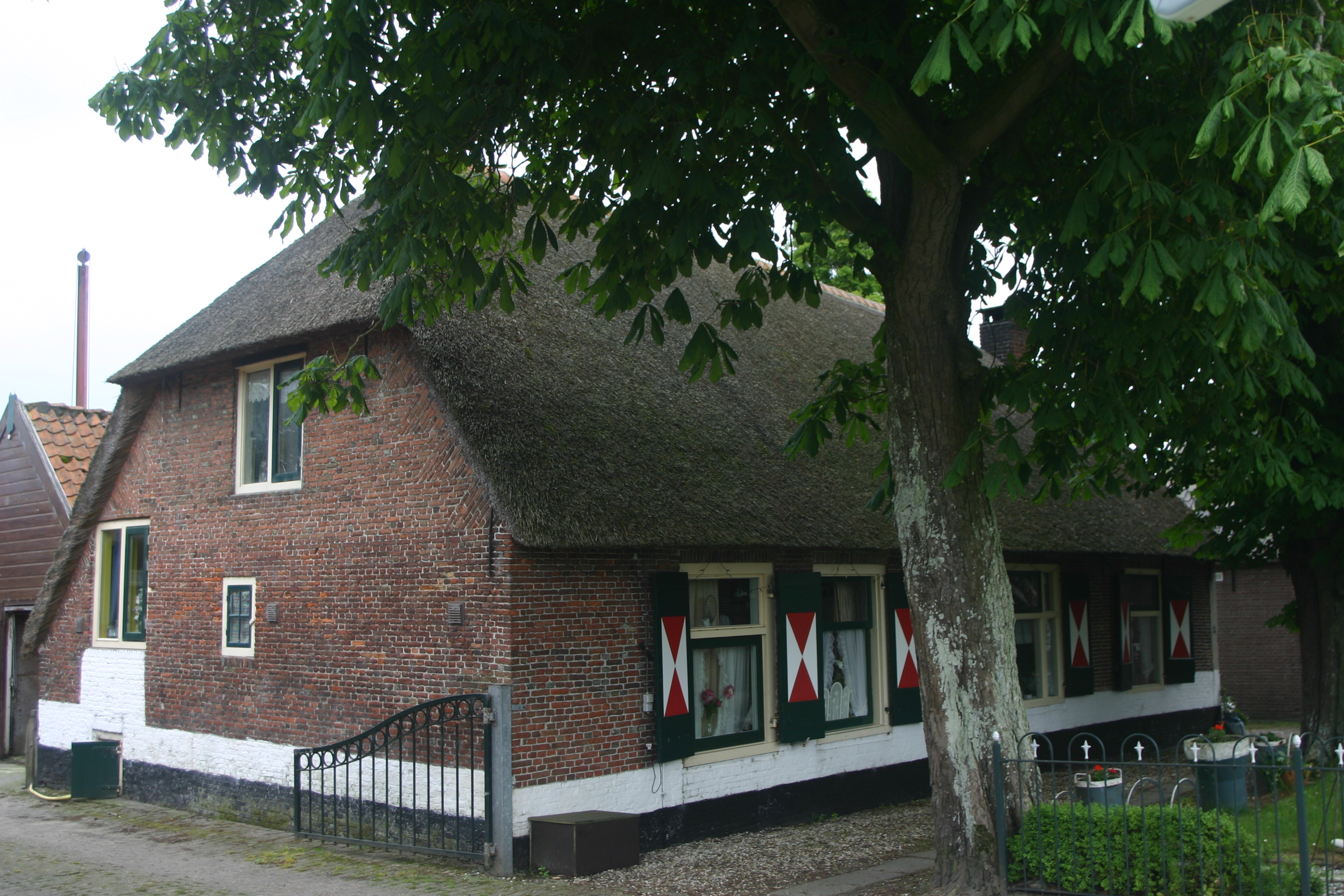
Farm on Kaag

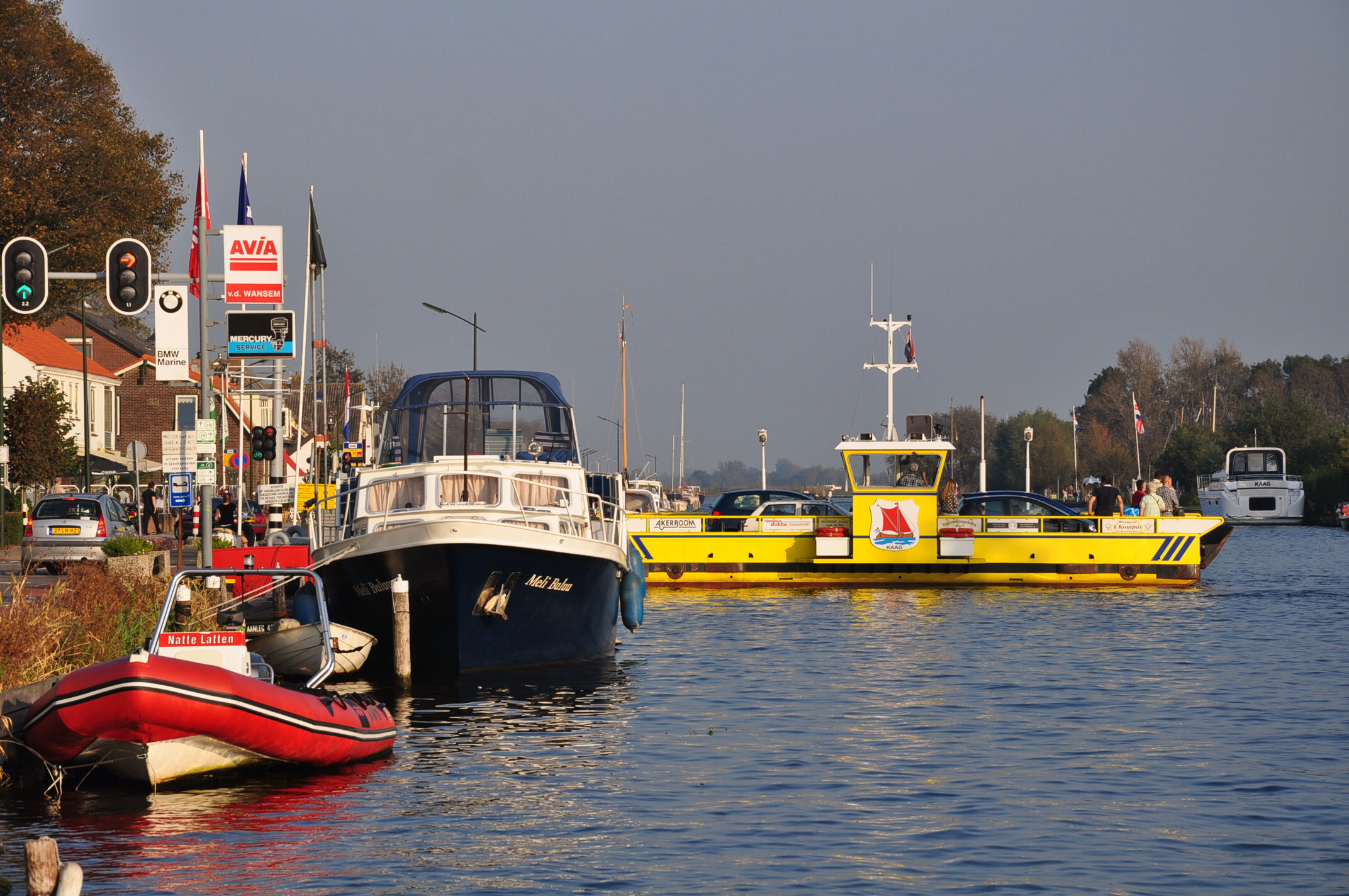
Ferry between Haarlemmermeer (left) and Kaag (right)
