= Kagerplassen =

- Kaag Lakes (English)
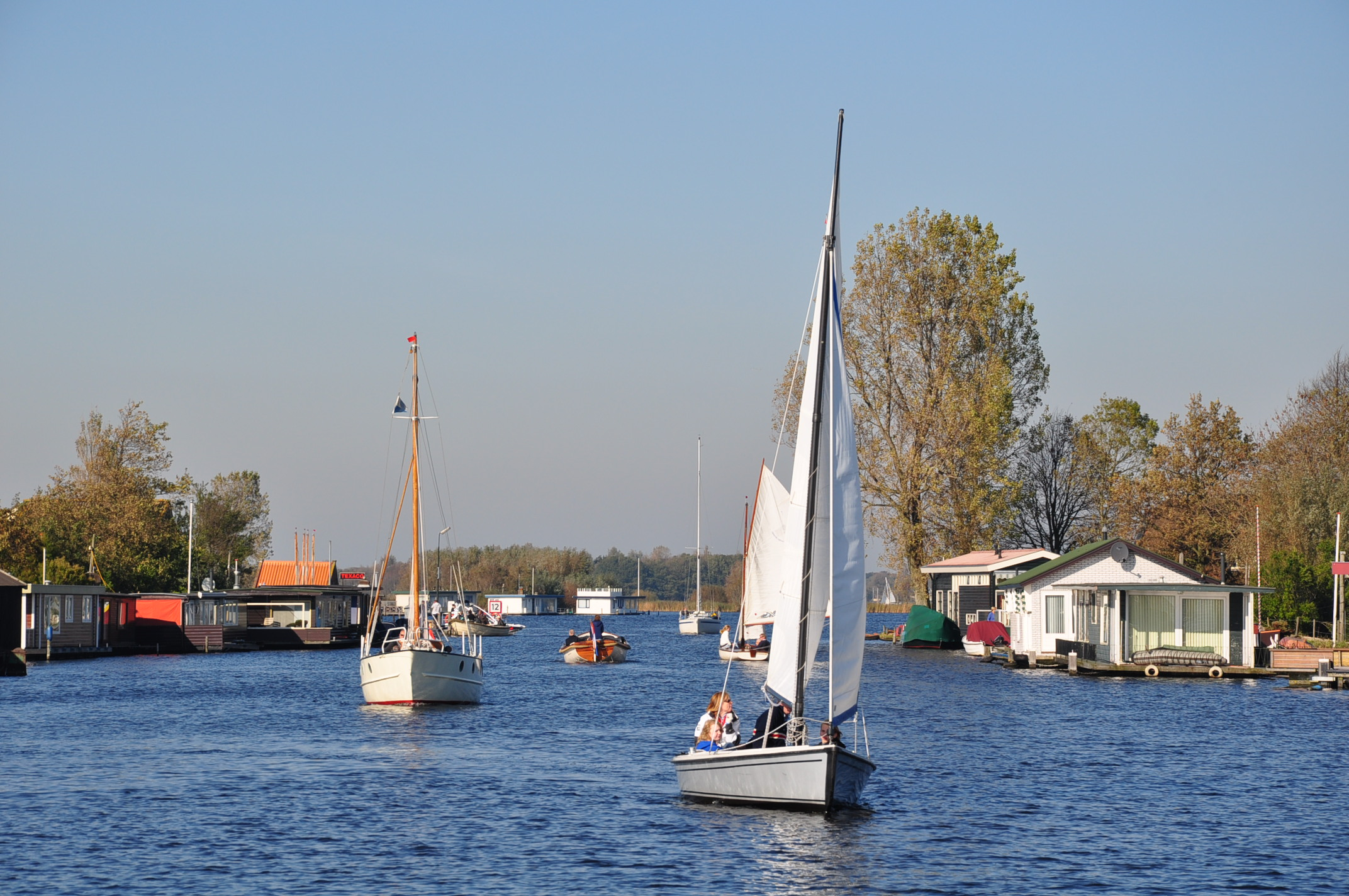
- Sailing on the river Zijp, one of the connecting waterways

- Location within South Holland Location within Netherlands

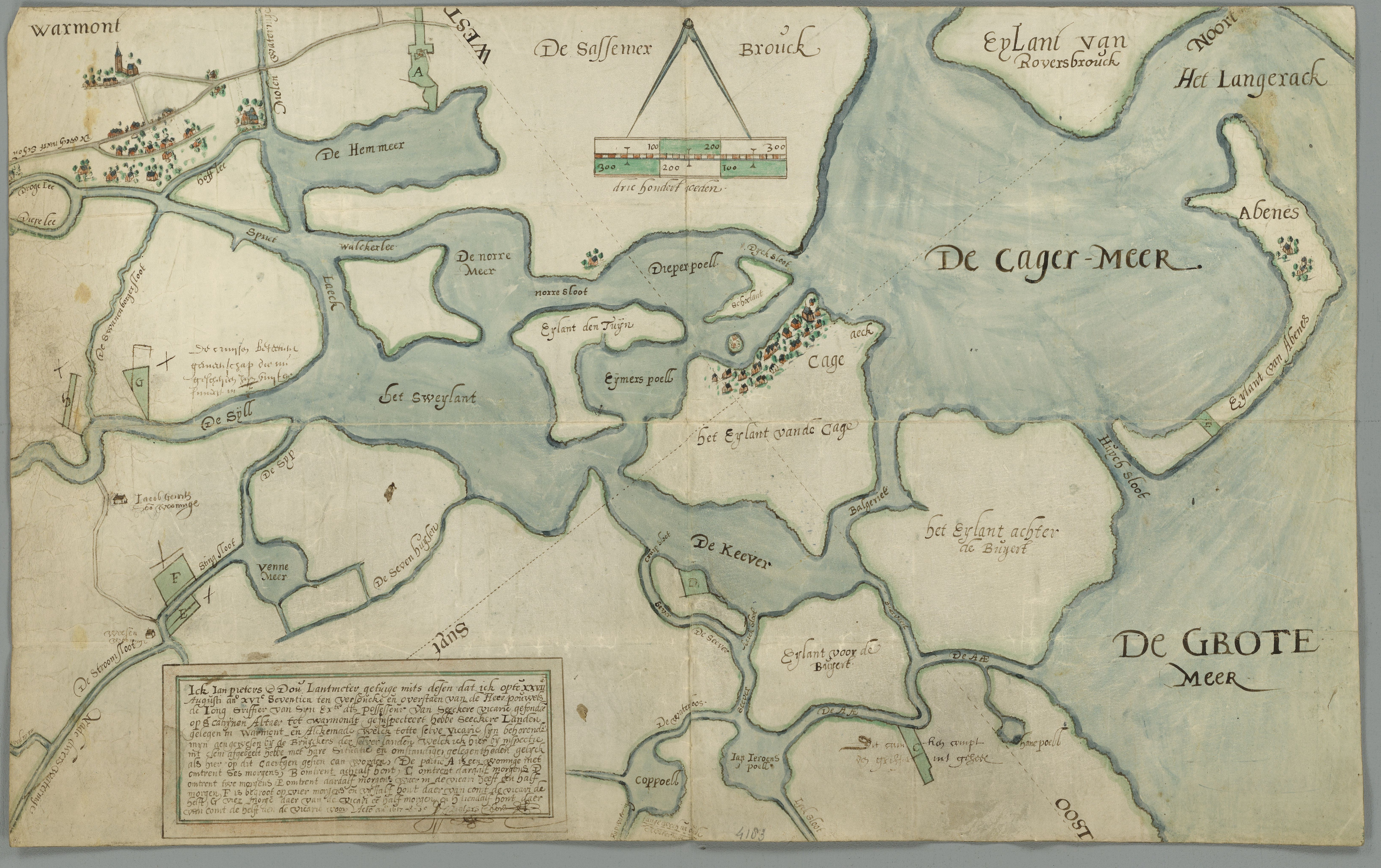
- Historical map of the lakes in 1617
- Location: South Holland
- Coordinates: 52°12′19″N 4°32′18″E
- Type: Fen lakes
- River sources: Haarlemmermeer Ring Waterway, Does River
- Basin countries: Netherlands
- Surface area: 3.43 km^{2} (1.32 sq mi)
- Average depth: 3.4 m (11 ft)
- Max. depth: 39–42 m (128–138 ft)
- Water volume: 24 million cubic metres (850×10^{6} cu ft)
- Surface elevation: −2.1 m (−6.9 ft)
- Islands: Kagereiland, de Lakerpolder, de Kogjespolder, Boterhuiseiland
- Sections/sub-basins: Hollandse Plassen, Braassemermeer, Wijde Aa, Westeinderplassen
- Settlements: Warmond, Oud Ade, Kaag, Rijpwetering, Sassenheim
- Area: 2,630 ha (10.2 sq mi)
- Designation: Key Biodiversity Area
- Established: 2016
- Website: KBA Website

The Kagerplassen (a Dutch term meaning "the Kaag Lakes") is a small lake system in South Holland located to the northeast of Leiden. The Kaag Lakes are a popular area for boating, watersports, fishing, camping and walking. Windmills, waterfront pasture land (weilanden) with grazing animals, quaint Dutch boats and buildings and (in season) flower fields are all part of the charm of boating and walking in this area.

== Places ==
The Kaag Lakes are part of two municipalities: Kaag en Braassem and Teylingen. Three villages that lay directly on the lakes are:

- Warmond (Teylingen)
- De Kaag (Kaag en Braassem)
- Buitenkaag (Haarlemmermeer, North Holland).

A number of other villages and towns (including Leiden itself) are located on connecting waterways providing easy access to the lakes.

The Kaag Lakes consist of an interconnected system of smaller lakes and waterways. The Kaag Lakes are fenland lakes (veenplassen) and part of the Holland-Utrecht wet fenland area (veenweidegebied). There are several islands, including the following:

- The only inhabited island is Kagereiland, on which De Kaag is situated.
- Two others islands, de Lakerpolder en de Kogjespolder, are managed by the Dutch Forestry Commission (Staatsbosbeheer).
- Another island situated in the southwestern part of the system is called Boterhuiseiland (literally, "Butterhouse Island"). For at least 50 years this has been the home of the Kaag Lakes Sea Scout Centre (Zeeverkennerscentrum Kagerplassen). During the boating season this centre provides a basis for around two dozen Sea Scout groups in the region. Campgrounds on the island are also used by other Dutch Scout groups.
- There is a canal named De Zijl that connects Leiden with the Kager Lakes (in the neighborhood of Leiderdorp).

The lakes are home to several sailing schools. The oldest sailing school is 't Vossenhol, founded in 1947 and situated on the Dieperpoel. In 1952 sailing school De Kaag was founded.

The Kaag Lakes are connected to a larger network of lakes and waterways called the Holland Lakes (Hollandse Plassen). The other lake systems are called the Braassemermeer, Wijde Aa and the Westeinderplassen. They are all connected by the Haarlemmermeer Ring Waterway, the Does river and many smaller waterways. This network means that much of northern South Holland is enjoyable for boating.

== Ferries ==
There are multiple ferry lines operating around the lakes:

- De Kaag (island) - Buitenkaag (24-hour ferry)
- Zevenhuizen - De Kaag island (seasonal ferry, operates June - August)
- Leiden (Merenwijk, north) - Eastern Warmond (bicycles and pedestrians only)

== Gallery ==
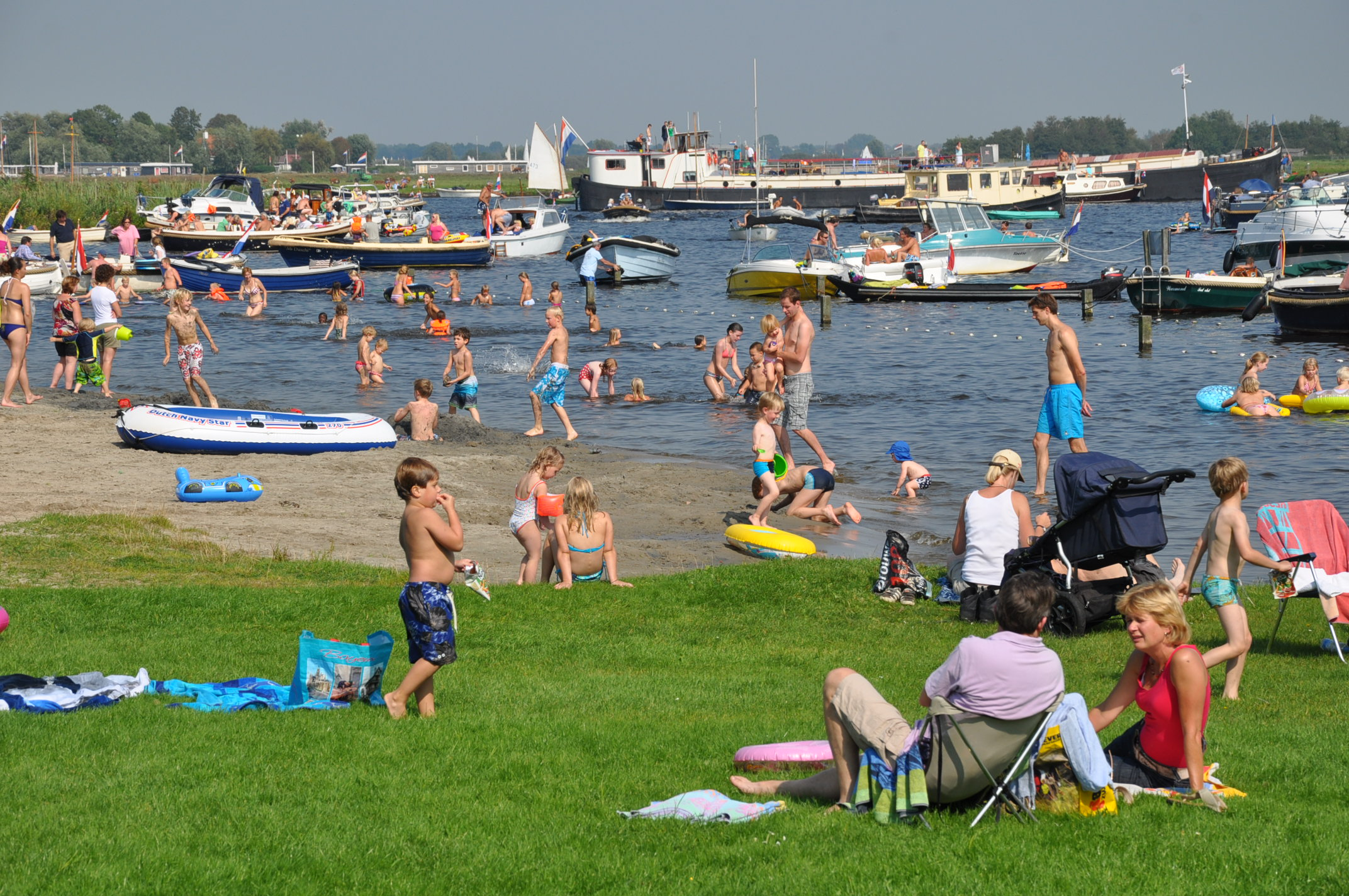
Recreation on the island Koudenhoorn in the Kaag lakes

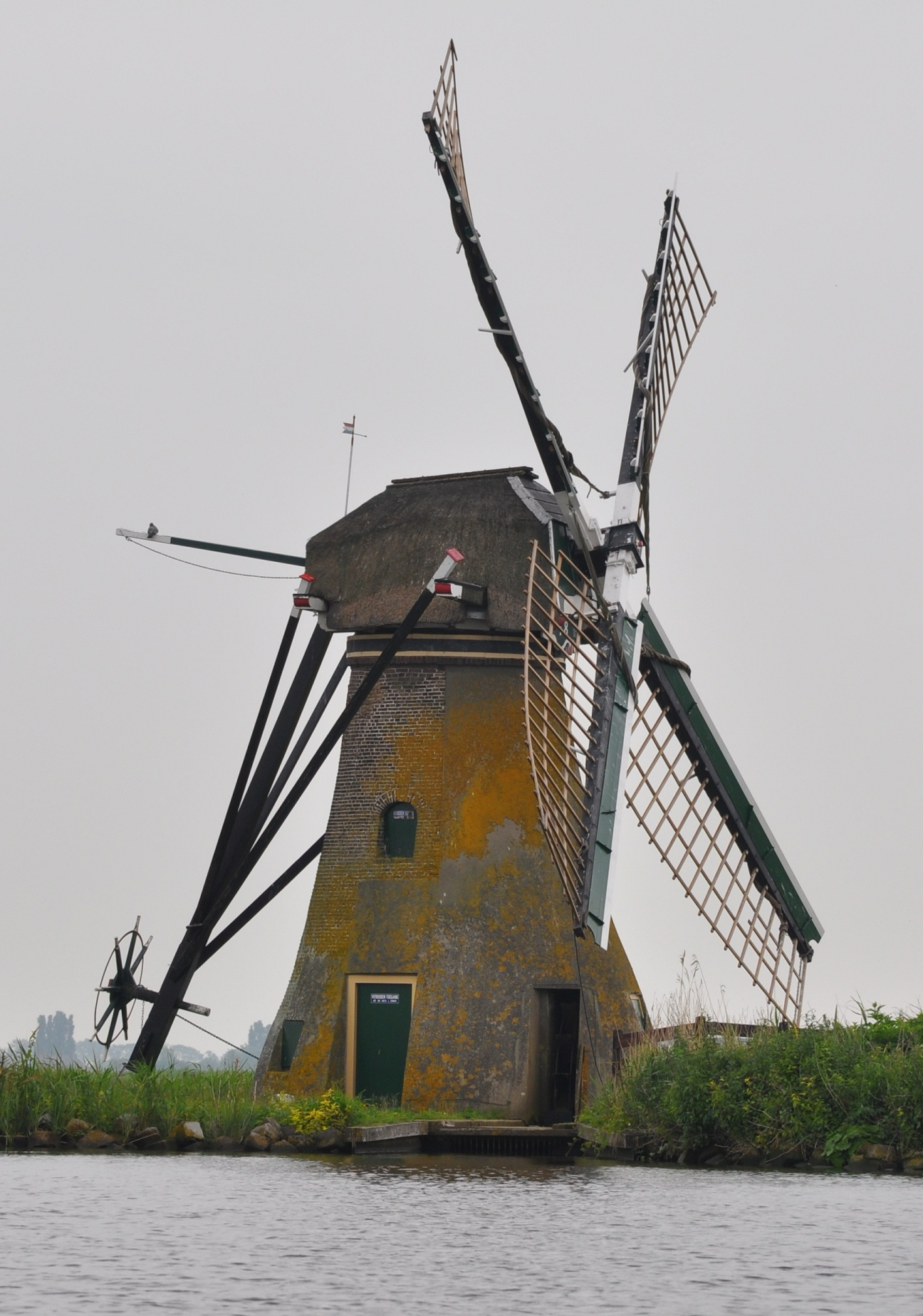
Windmill De Kok

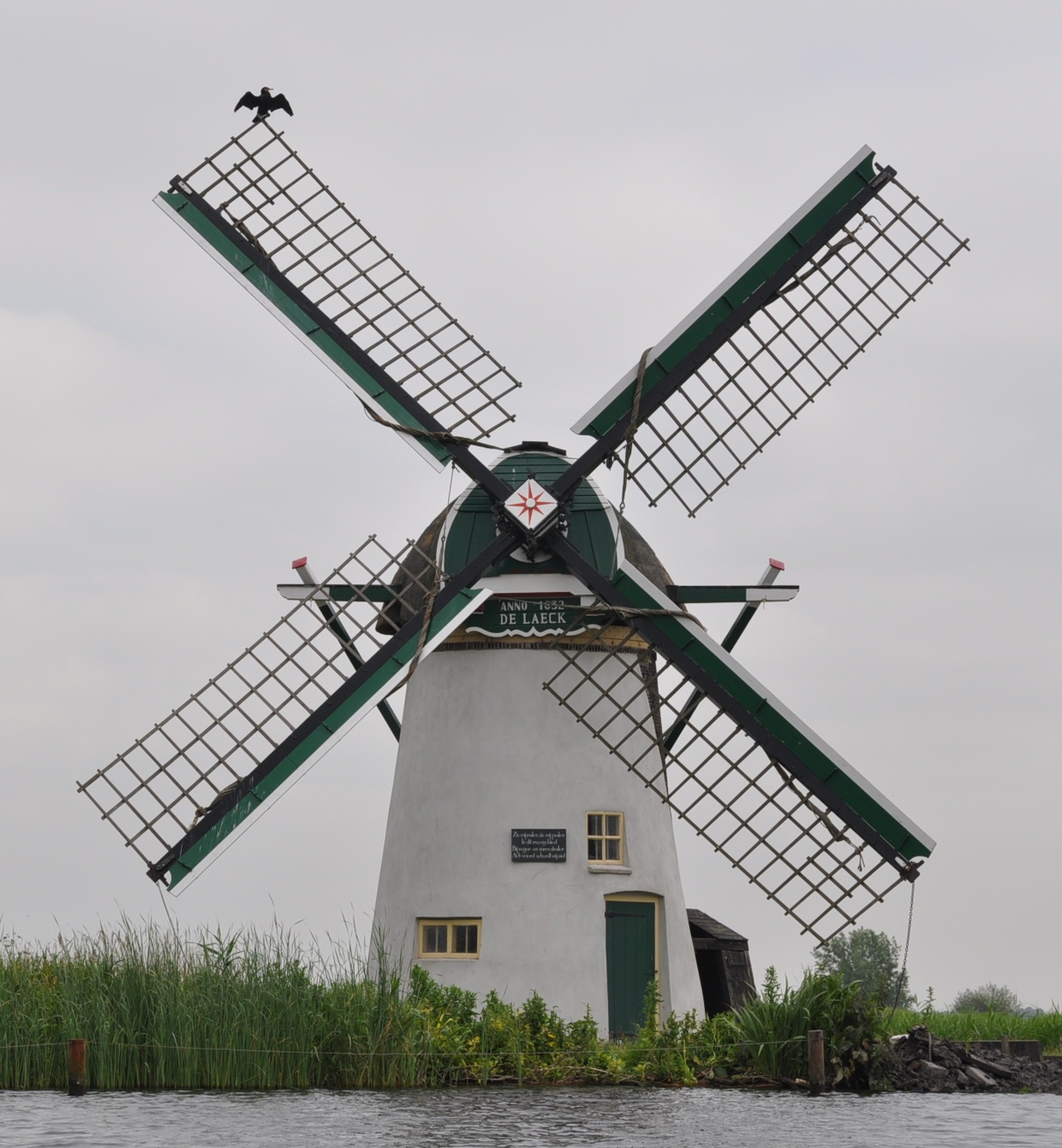
Windmill Laakmolen

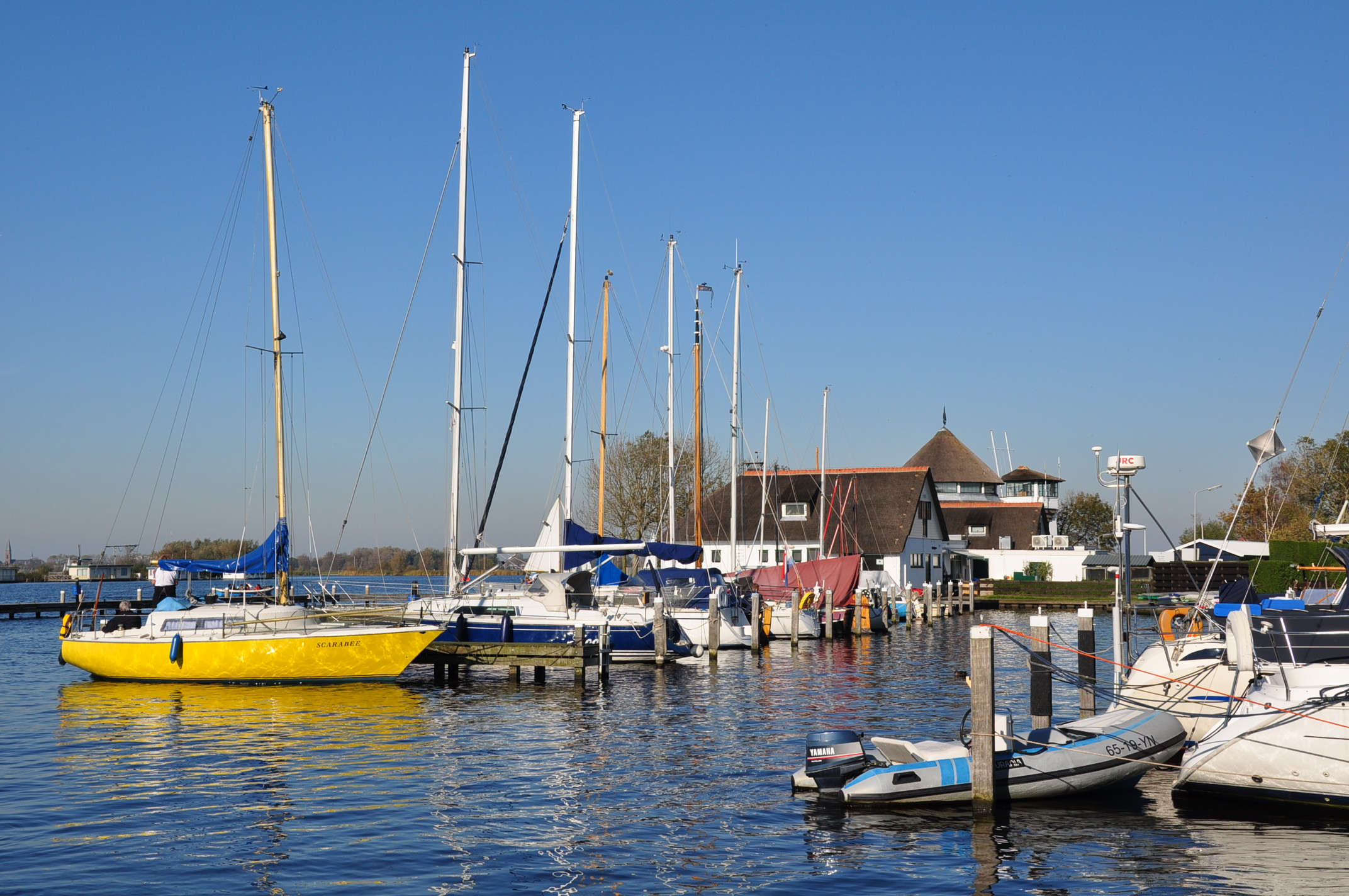
Kager Lakes with a dock

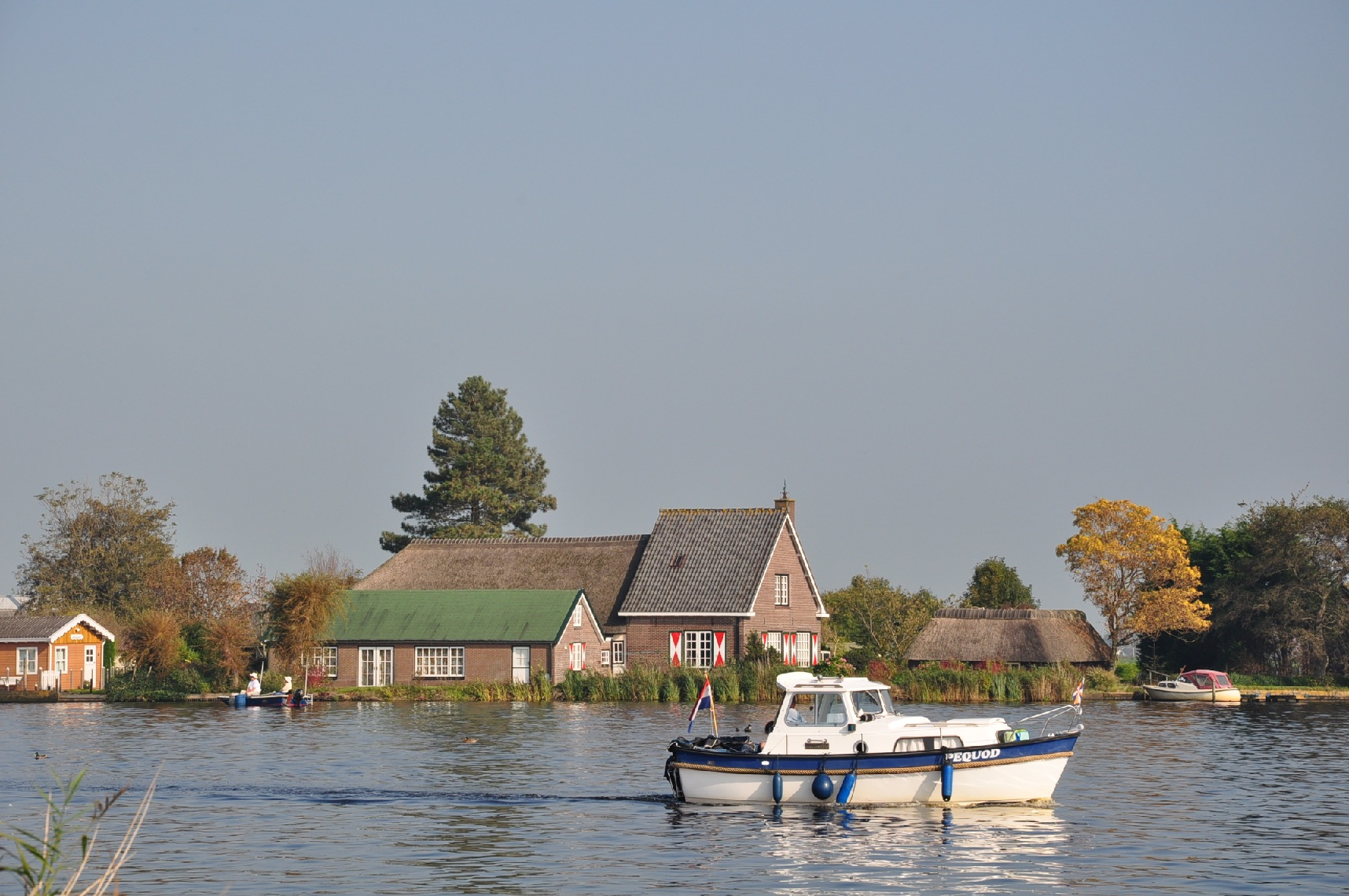
Autumn at the Vennemeer ("Lake Venne")

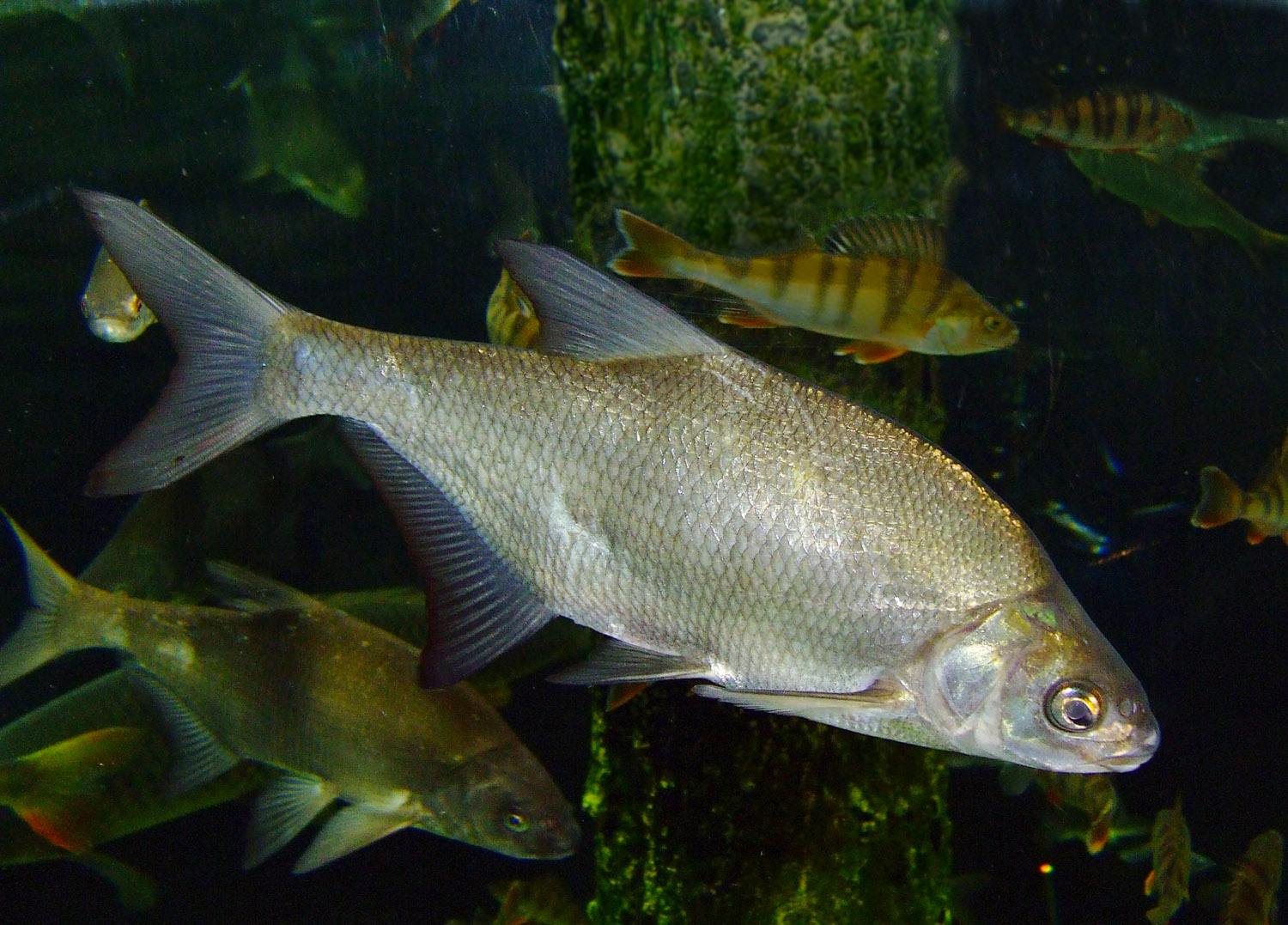
Carp live in the Kagerplassen

== See also ==
- Zijl
