= Buitenkaag =

- Village
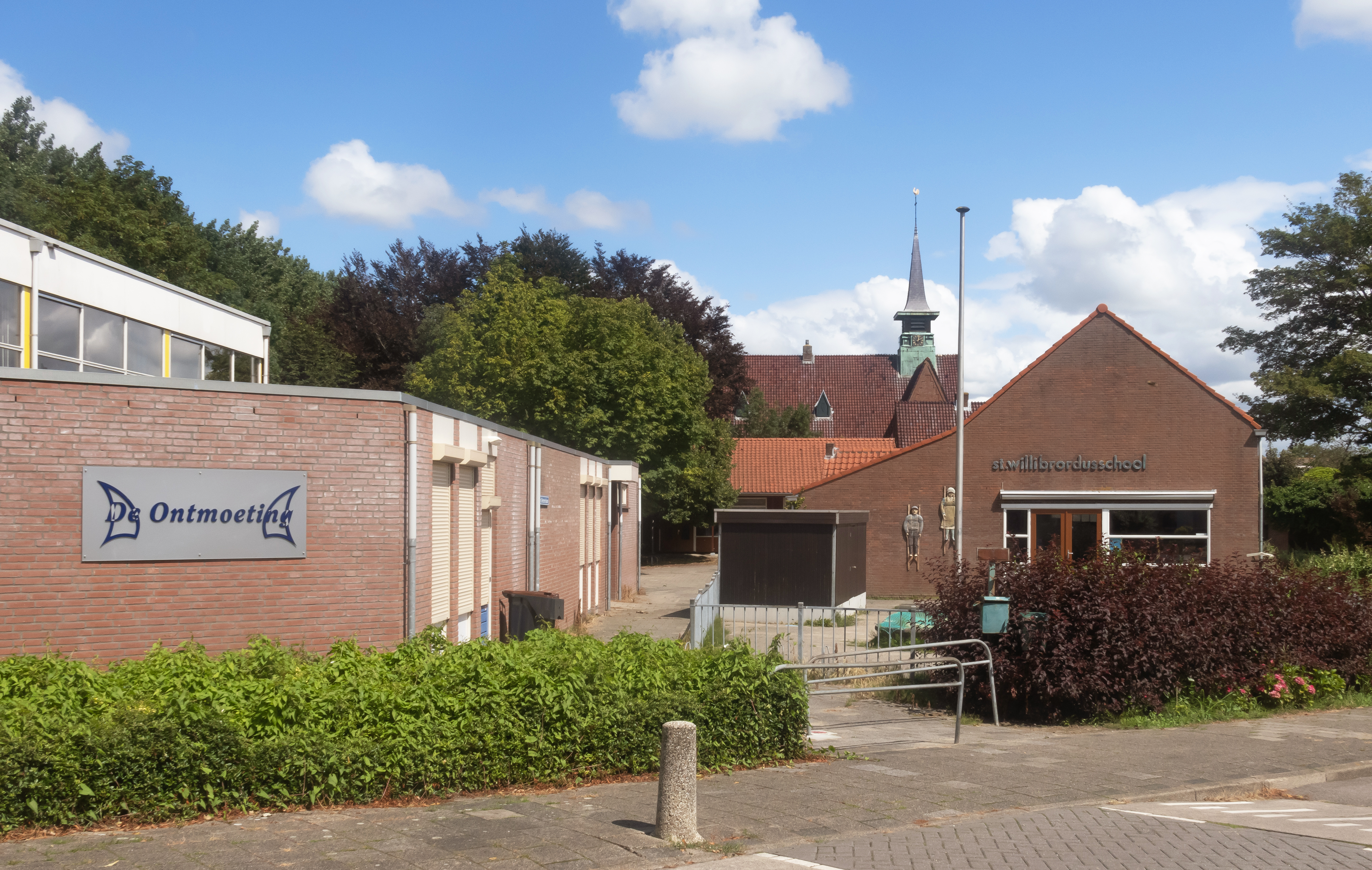
- Village house, church (Kerkcomplex Joannes Evangelist ) and school

- Location in the Netherlands Location in the province of North Holland in the Netherlands
- Coordinates: 52°13′N 4°34′E
- Country: Netherlands
- Province: North Holland
- Municipality: Haarlemmermeer

Area
  - Total: 1.09 km^{2} (0.42 sq mi)
- Elevation: −0.3 m (−0.98 ft)

Population (2021)
  - Total: 480
  - Density: 440/km^{2} (1,100/sq mi)
- Time zone: UTC+1 (CET)
  - Summer (DST): UTC+2 (CEST)
- Postal code: 2158
- Dialing code: 0252

Buitenkaag is a village in the Dutch province of North Holland. It is a part of the municipality of Haarlemmermeer, and lies about 8 km northeast of Leiden. The name Buitenkaag (Outer Kaag) refers to the town Kaag and the surrounding lake area, the Kagerplassen. The village officially received the name in 1859.

One of the most distinctive buildings in Buitenkaag is "Gemaal de Leeghwater", a pumping station named after Jan Leeghwater. Built in the mid-19th century to reclaim the Haarlemmermeer lake, it is still operational today. Originally, it was based on steam engine. In 1930, diesel engines were installed in the pumping station.

== Gallery ==
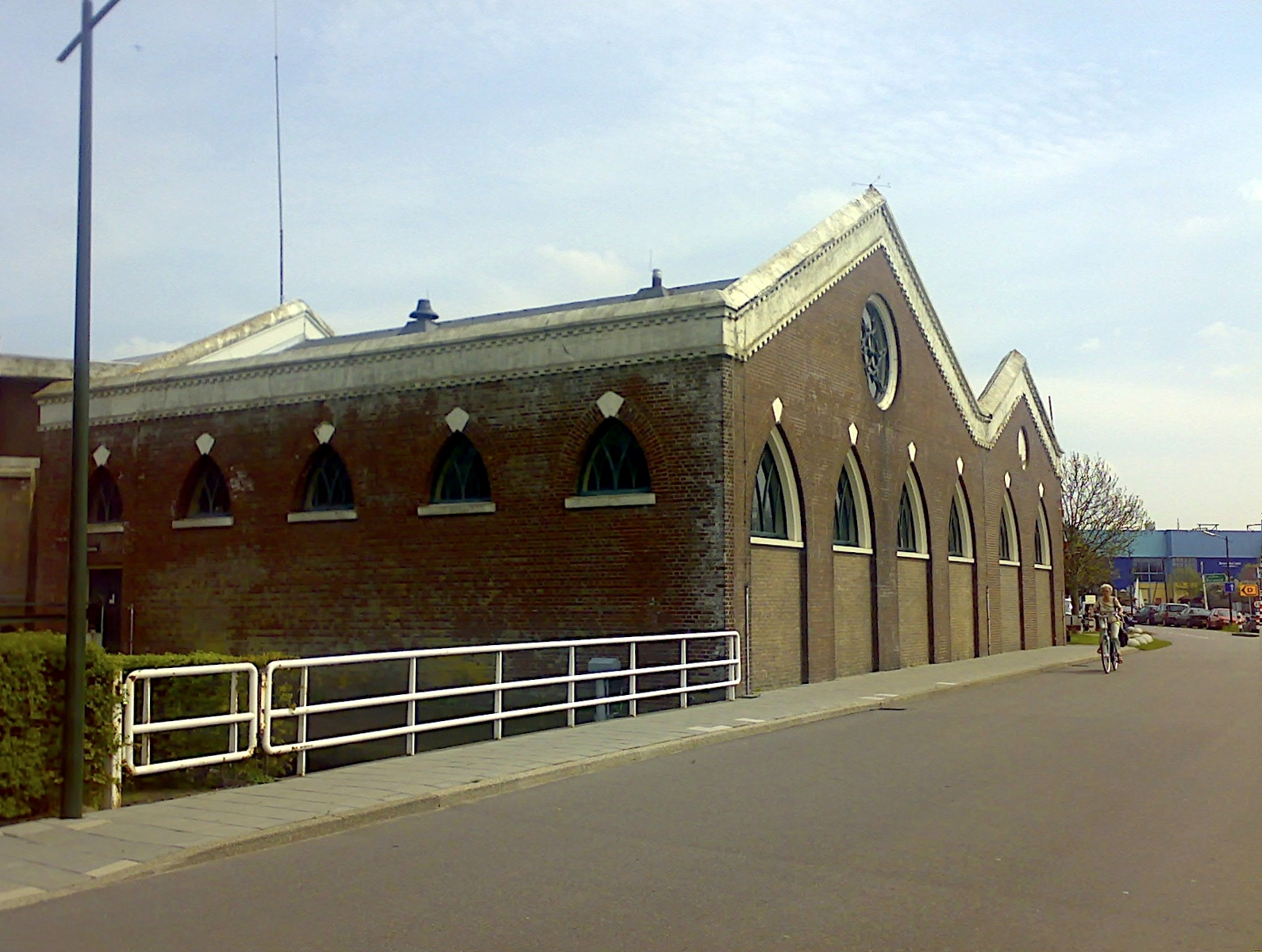
Leeghwater pumping station
