= Zijl =

River of the Netherlands

Coordinates: 52°11′54″N 4°32′10″E

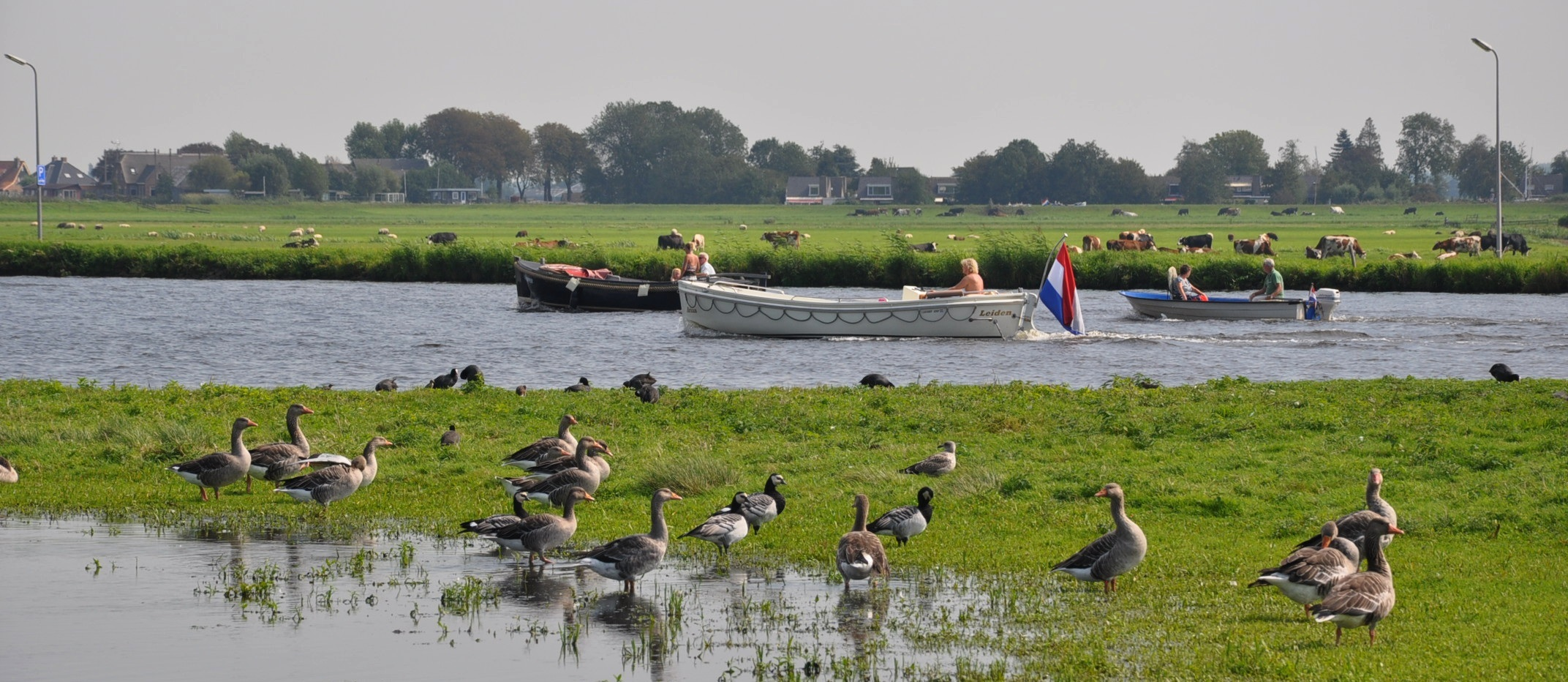
Recreational boating on the Zijl; in the background, the Boterhuispolder.

The Zijl (formerly known as Zyl) is a short river in the Dutch province of South Holland that connects the Old Rhine (Oude Rijn) with the Kagerplassen. The Zijl flows in a south–north direction and is only 4.56 kilometers long, running from the Spanjaardsbrug in the city of Leiden to the Kager plas Zweiland. There are two islands in the Zijl: Zijleiland and Boterhuiseiland. The northern section was previously referred to as the Rechte Zijl, while the southern part was known as the Kromme Zijl.

The Zijl (1204: SIle) was originally a tidal creek, with its northern part dug around 1200 for drainage into the Kagerplassen. The Middle Dutch word sīle and Old Frisian sīl both mean 'water drainage' and belong to the same root as zijgen (Old High German sīhan, meaning to sieve, to drip). It has the same origin as the word zijl (sluice gate) and is related to Old Norse sīl (slow-flowing water) and Middle Low German sīl (watercourse, sewer).

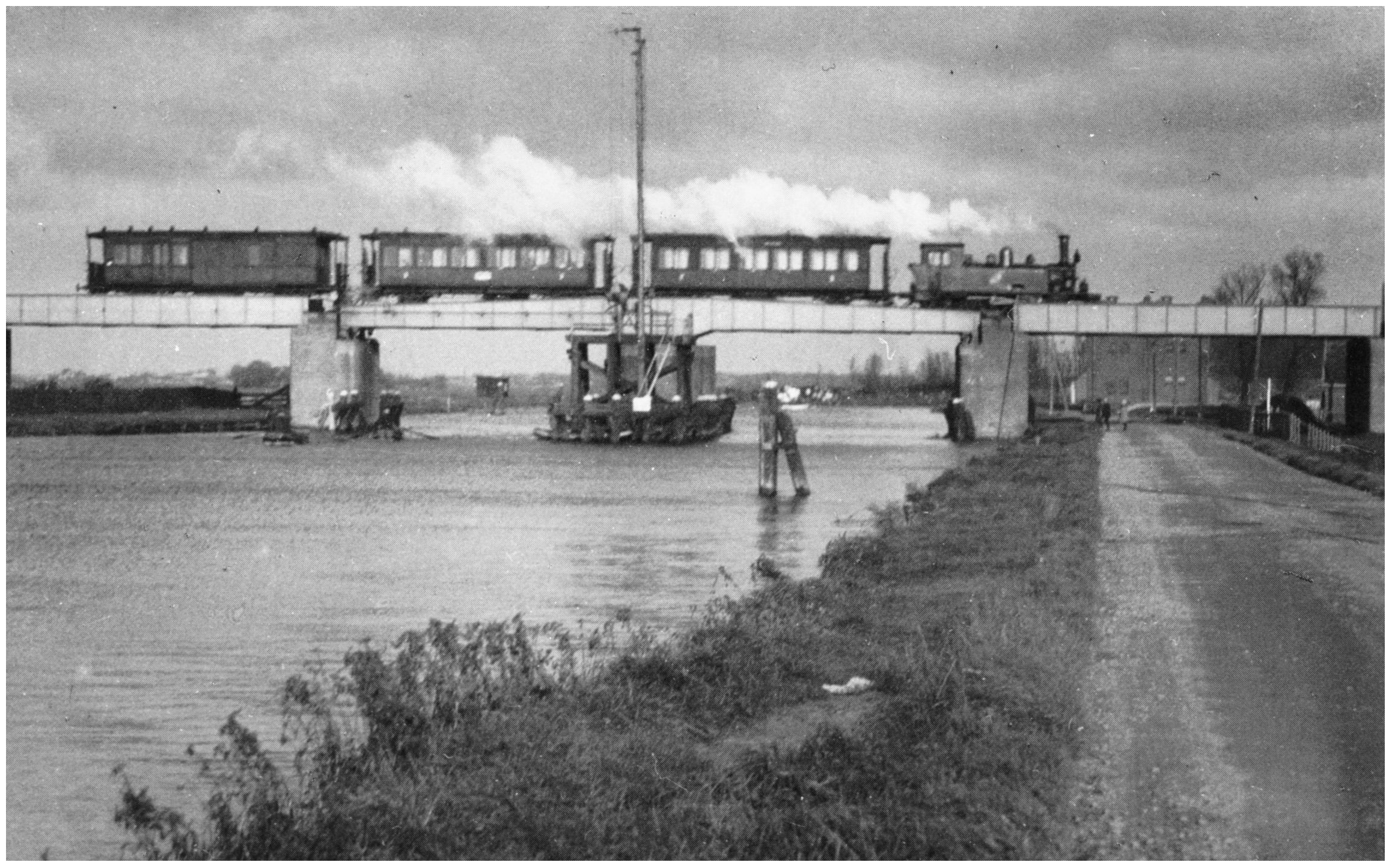
Swing bridge of the Haarlemmermeerspoorlijn over the Zijl, circa 1930. The bridge was demolished in the late 1930s. On the right is the Zijldijk.

== Course ==
The Zijl branches off from the Old Rhine in Leiden, flowing in a northerly direction, where it intersects with the Rijn-Schie canal (Rijn-Schiekanaal) that proceeds in a southerly direction. In the southern portion of its course, the river serves as the municipal boundary between Leiden and Leiderdorp. In the southernmost section, both the west bank of Leiden and the east bank of Leiderdorp are densely urbanized. Moving north from the Driegatenbrug bridge, the east bank gradually merges into the open grassland of the Boterhuispolder, which remains under Leiderdorp's jurisdiction in this area. Beyond the Leidse Merenwijk, the Zijl enters entirely into the territory of Warmond (municipality of Teylingen). Along its eastern bank in this stretch runs the Zijldijk, a road that leads to a dead end for traffic.

On the western side of the Zijl, beyond Leiden, within Warmond's jurisdiction, lies the remnant of the Broek and Simontjespolder, followed by the island of De Strengen with its long northern spur, Tengnagel (which is only a few tens of meters wide). Adjacent to the western side of Tengnagel is 't Joppe, one of the most frequented navigated areas within the Kagerplassen. North of the tip of Tengnagel, the Zijl remains in direct connection with 't Joppe. A few hundred meters further north, at the northernmost point of the Boterhuispolder and the Kaagsociëteit, the Zijl converges with the Kager Lake Zweiland, along with the Zijp (which flows in from the southeast).

During the summer, a ferry operates over the Zijl, providing service from the Zijldijk to the Broek and Simontjespolder in the Kagerzoom, situated just above the Leiden Lakes District.

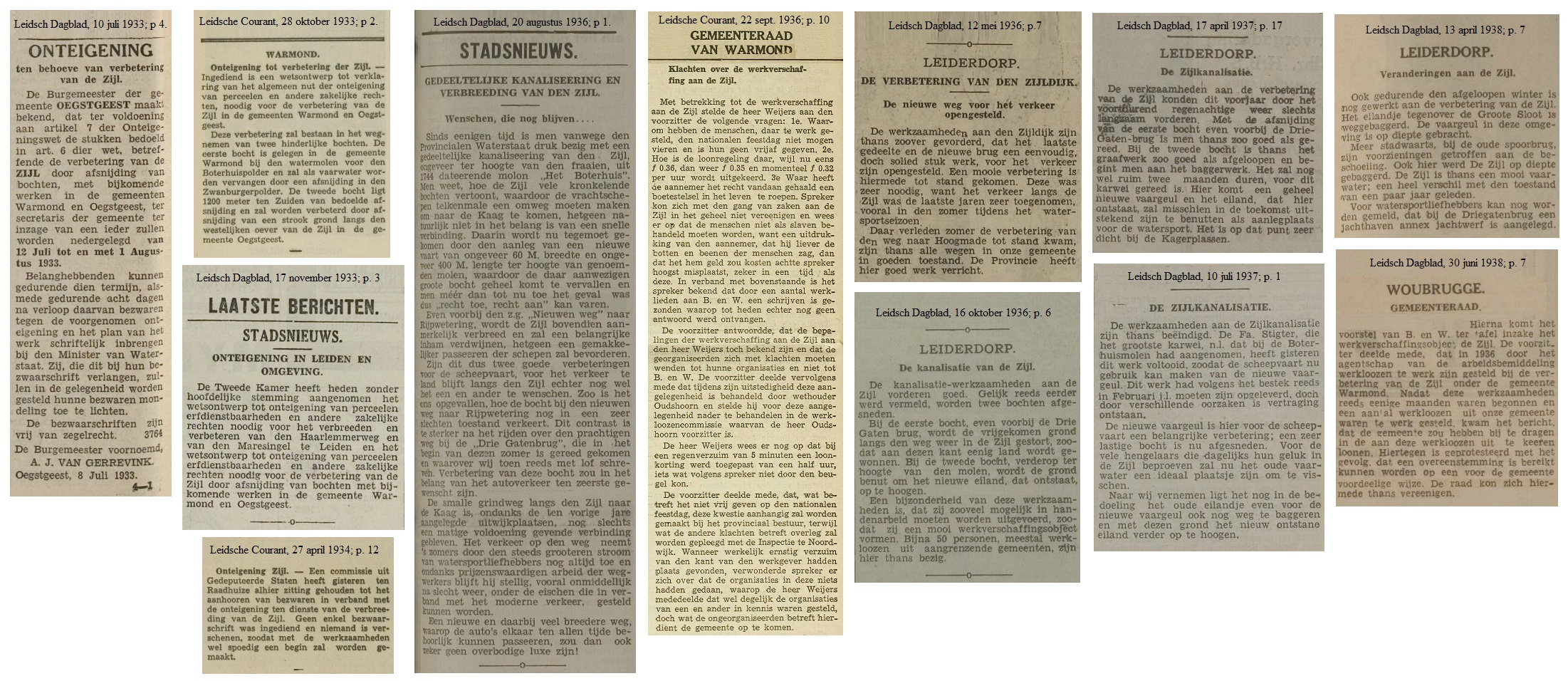
Various newspaper articles from the 1930s about the canalization of the Zijl, including its use as a public employment project. Readable when clicked on for full size.

== History ==
The Zijl partly existed as a tidal creek when the Rhine at Katwijk was still in open connection with the sea, more than 1,000 years ago. In the 12th century, that estuary silted up and the Rhineland suffered regular flooding due to the lack of proper drainage. It was then decided to dig out the existing creeks Zyl and Does to the north so the excess water could be drained to the Kagerplassen and the Haarlemmermeer (then still a real lake) and from there to the Spaarne and the IJ. An alliance of 15 trades on both sides of the Old Rhine took on this task around 1200. The digging and maintenance of these waterways could only be carried out successfully through regional coordination. An organization emerged that inspected the works and imposed maintenance obligations on the districts. This is how the later Hoogheemraadschap van Rijnland came into being. An earlier fortified residential tower or castle located on the eastern bank of the water from around 1300 was called the Huys Ter Zijl, later called Zijlhof, and was the ancestral home of the Van Zijl family. This castle was demolished in the 18th century.

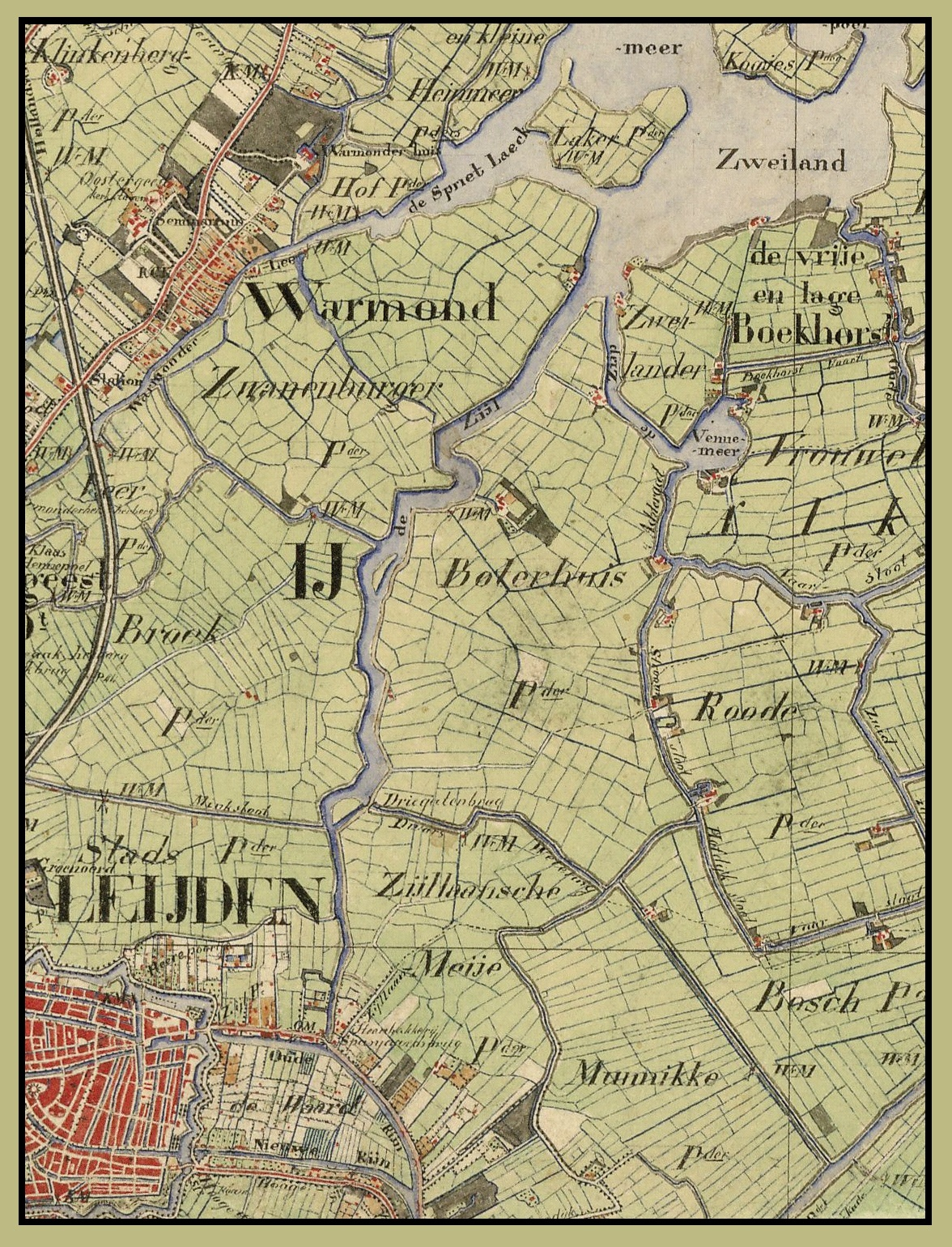
This part of a map of South Holland from 1850 to 1851 shows the Zijl River, starting in the south at the Spanjaardsbrug and ending at its mouth in the Kager plas Zweiland. Moving from south to north, there are two islands in the river. During the improvement of the Zijl in 1936–37, the main flow of the river was redirected from the west side to the east side of the southernmost island (the Zijleiland, opposite the Driegatenbrug). The northern island, located in the middle of the river, was dredged away. Finally, during these works, the southeastern protruding point of the Zwanburgerpolder was cut off, resulting in the creation of the Boterhuiseiland. In the 1970s, significant portions of the Zwanburgerpolder were subsequently excavated.

== Management and canalization in the 1930s ==
The Hoogheemraadschap van Rijnland is responsible for water quality, water quantity and flood defenses in the Zijl River. However, the river and its bank defenses are owned by the province of South Holland, since January 5, 1932. It is thus a provincial waterway. As such, the province also has the responsibility for management and maintenance. These tasks are carried out in consultation with the Hoogheemraadschap.

Beginning in 1932, the province took its new river responsibilities seriously and soon sent a bill to the House of Representatives to widen and canalize the Zijl. These works were also intended as employment projects during the crisis years (1930s). The bill, titled: Declaration of the public utility of expropriation of plots, easements and other property rights, necessary for the improvement of the Zijl by cutting off bends, with additional works, in the municipalities of Warmond and Oegstgeest, was passed by the Lower House on November 17, 1933, without deliberation and without a roll-call vote. The works were carried out in 1936 and 1937. In the process, a point of the Zwanburgerpolder opposite the Boterhuismolen was excavated. This cut-off piece of polder (4 hectares) became the Boterhuiseiland, which is often considered an island in the Kagerplassen but actually lies in the Zijl; after all, the Zijl only empties into the lakes 1.5 km further on. 1200 m to the south, opposite the Driegatenbrug, the Zijleiland already existed. The main stream of the Zijl curved around the west side of this island; due to dredging, the main stream was shifted to the east side of this island. Today, the Zijlzicht Marina is located on the Zijleiland.

During channelization in 1936, an unnamed island was also dredged away near the Broek and Simontjespolder, where the ferry is now. The river is very wide there. The road over the Zijldijk (until then a gravel path) was also improved.

From about 1912 until the late 1930s, there was a swing bridge over the Zijl of the Hoofddorp - Leiden Heerensingel railroad line, part of the Haarlemmermeer railway lines. This bridge was located near today's Willem de Zwijgerlaan in Leiden. This railroad line was discontinued around 1935, after which the bridge was demolished.

== Names ==
Besides the Zijldijk in Warmond, the Zijl has also given its name to the Zijlsingel (meaning singel and street), the Zijlstraat, the Zijloever, the Zijlpoort (one of the old Leiden city gates), the Zijldonk, and at the Sportcomplex de Zijl (all in Leiden) and in Leiderdorp at the Zijlkwartier, the Zijlbaan, the Zijllaan, the Zijloordkade, the Zijlstroom, the Zijllaan and Meijepolder (also called the Zijllaansche Meijepolder) and Meelfabriek Zijlstroom BV. Since 2008, there is also a small type of sailing sloop named after this small river: the Zijlsloep.

== See also ==
- Sluice
