= List of boat types =

This is a list of boat types. For sailing ships, see: List of sailing boat types

== A ==
- Adirondack guideboat
- Airboat
- Amphibious automobile
- Amphibious vehicle
- Ark
- Auxiliary ship

Top of page

== B ==
- Banana boat
- Banana boat
- Barge
- Bow rider
- Bracera
- Bragozzo
- Brig
- Brigantine
- Bucentaur

== C ==
- Cabin cruiser
- Canoe
- Cape Islander
- Captain's gig
- Car-boat
- Car float
- Caravel
- Catamaran
- Center console
- Chundan vallam
- Coble
- Cog
- Coracle
- Cornish pilot gig
- Crash rescue boat
- Cuddy boat
- Cutter
- Currach (sp. to West of Ireland and Scotland)
- Cruise ship

Top of page

== D ==
- Dhow
- Dhoni
- Dinghy
- Dorna
- Dory
- Dragon boat
- Drift boat
- Drifter (fishing)
- Drifter (naval)
- Dugout
- Durham boat

Top of page

== E ==
- Electric boat
- Express cruiser

Top of page

== F ==
- Fast attack craft
- Faering
- Felucca
- Ferry
- Fireboat
- Fishing vessel
- Fish tug
- Float tube
- Fly

Top of page

== G ==
- Galley
- Galleon
- Gallivat
- Galway hooker
- Garbage scow
- Gig (boat)
- Go-fast boat
- Gondola
- Gunboat
- Gundalow
- Great Lakes freighter

Top of page

== H ==
- Higgins
- Houario
- Houseboat
- Hovercraft
- Hydrofoil
- Hydroplane

Top of page

== I ==
- Ice boat
- Inflatable boat

Top of page

== J ==
- Jetboat
- Jet ski
- Johnboat
- Jukung
- Junk

Top of page

== K ==
- Kayak and Sea kayak
- Ketch
- Kettuvallam

Top of page

== L ==
- Launch
- Landing craft
- Lifeboat
- Lighter
- Liner
- LNG carrier
- Log boat
- Langschiff
- Longboat
- Longship
- Longtail
- Lugger
- Luxury yacht

Top of page

== M ==
- Mackinaw boat
- Masula boat
- Missile boat
- Monitor
- Motorboat
- Motor Launch (naval)

Top of page

== N ==
- Narrowboat
- Naval ship
- Nordland
- Norfolk wherry

Top of page

== O ==
- Oiler (ship)
- Optimist
- Outrigger canoe

Top of page

== P ==
- Padded V-hull
- Paddle steamer
- Patrol boat
- Pedalo (paddle boat)
- Personal water craft (PWC)
- Pinnace (ship's boat)
- Pink (ship)
- Pirogue
- Pleasure barge
- Pleasure craft
- Police watercraft
- Pontoon
- Powerboat
- Pram (boat)
- Pram (ship)
- Proa
- Pump boat
- Punt

Top of page

== Q ==
- Q-Ship
- Quinquereme

Top of page

== R ==
- Raft
- Reaction ferry
- Recreational trawler
- Reed boat
- Replenishment oiler
- Rigid-hulled inflatable
- Riverboat
- Rodney boat
- Roll-on/roll-off ship
- Rowboat
- Runabout

Top of page

== S ==
- Sailboat
- Sampan
- Schooner
- Scow
- Sea kayak and Kayak
- Shad boat
- Shallop
- Sharpie
- Shikara
- Ship's tender
- Ski boat
- Skiff
- Skipjack
- Smack (ship)
- Small-craft sailing
- Slipper Launch
- Sloop
- Speed boat
- Special Operations Craft – Riverine (SOC-R)
- Steam boat
- Submarine
- Surf boat
- Surfboard
- Swift boat

Top of page

== T ==
- Tanker
- Tarai Bune
- Tartane
- Tjotter
- Torpedo boat
- Tour boat
- Towboat
- Trabaccolo
- Trailer sailor
- Train ferry
- Trimaran
- Trireme
- Trawler (fishing)
- Trawler (naval)
- Trawler (recreational)
- Trow
- Tugboat

Top of page

== U ==
- U-boat
- Umiak

Top of page

== V ==
- Vaporetto
- Very Slender Vessel
- Vlet

Top of page

== W ==
- Waka
- Wakeboard boat
- Walkaround
- Water ambulance
- Water taxi
- Weidling
- Whaleboat
- Wherry

Top of page

== X ==
- Xebec

Top of page

== Y ==
- Yacht
- Yawl
- Yoal

Top of page

== Z ==
- Zille

Top of page

== See also ==
- Lists of watercraft types
