= Launch (boat) =

Type of boat

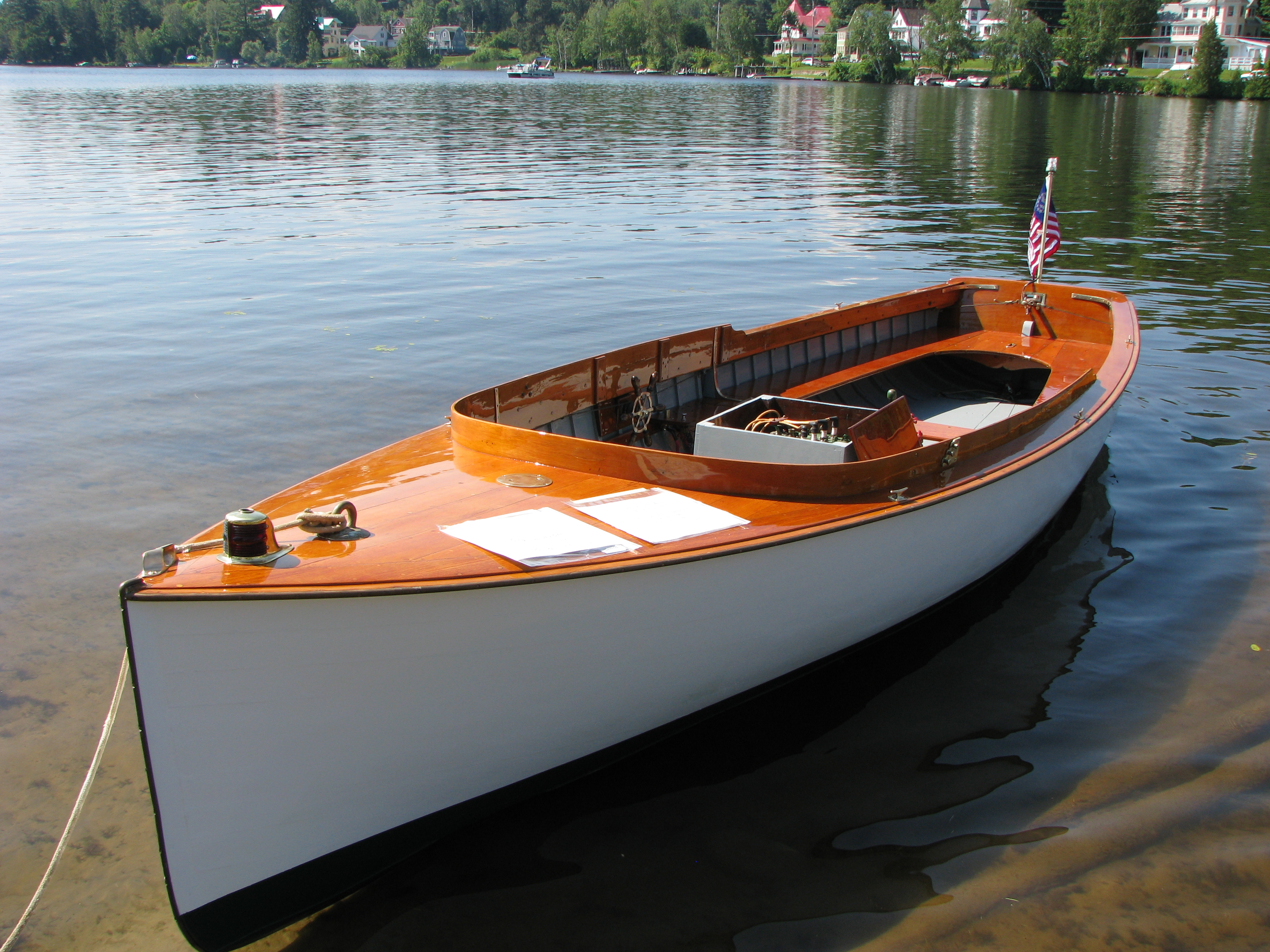
1910 Mathis launch, 15 horsepower universal engine, at Saranac Lake, New York

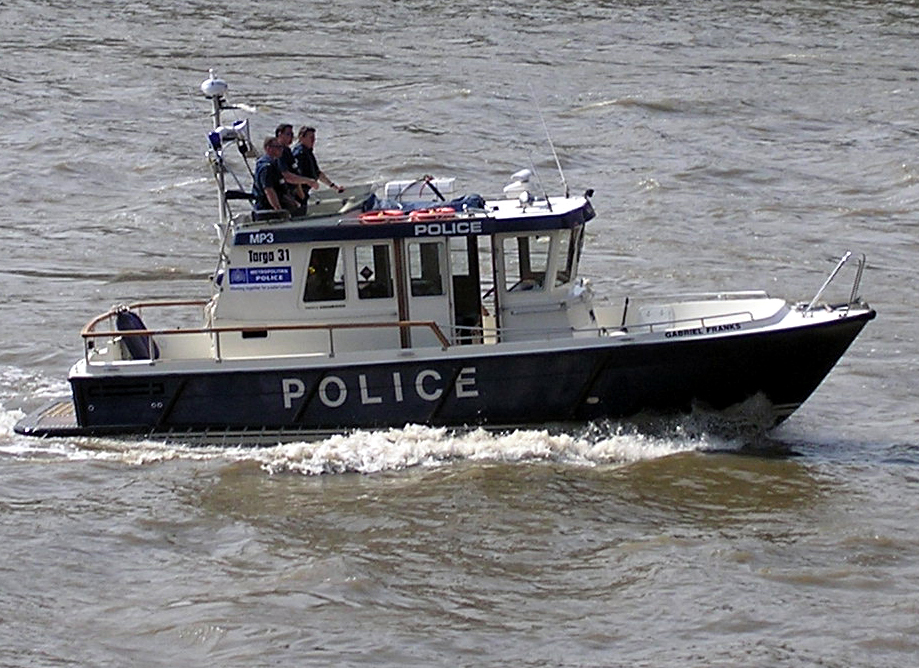
A police launch operating on the Thames

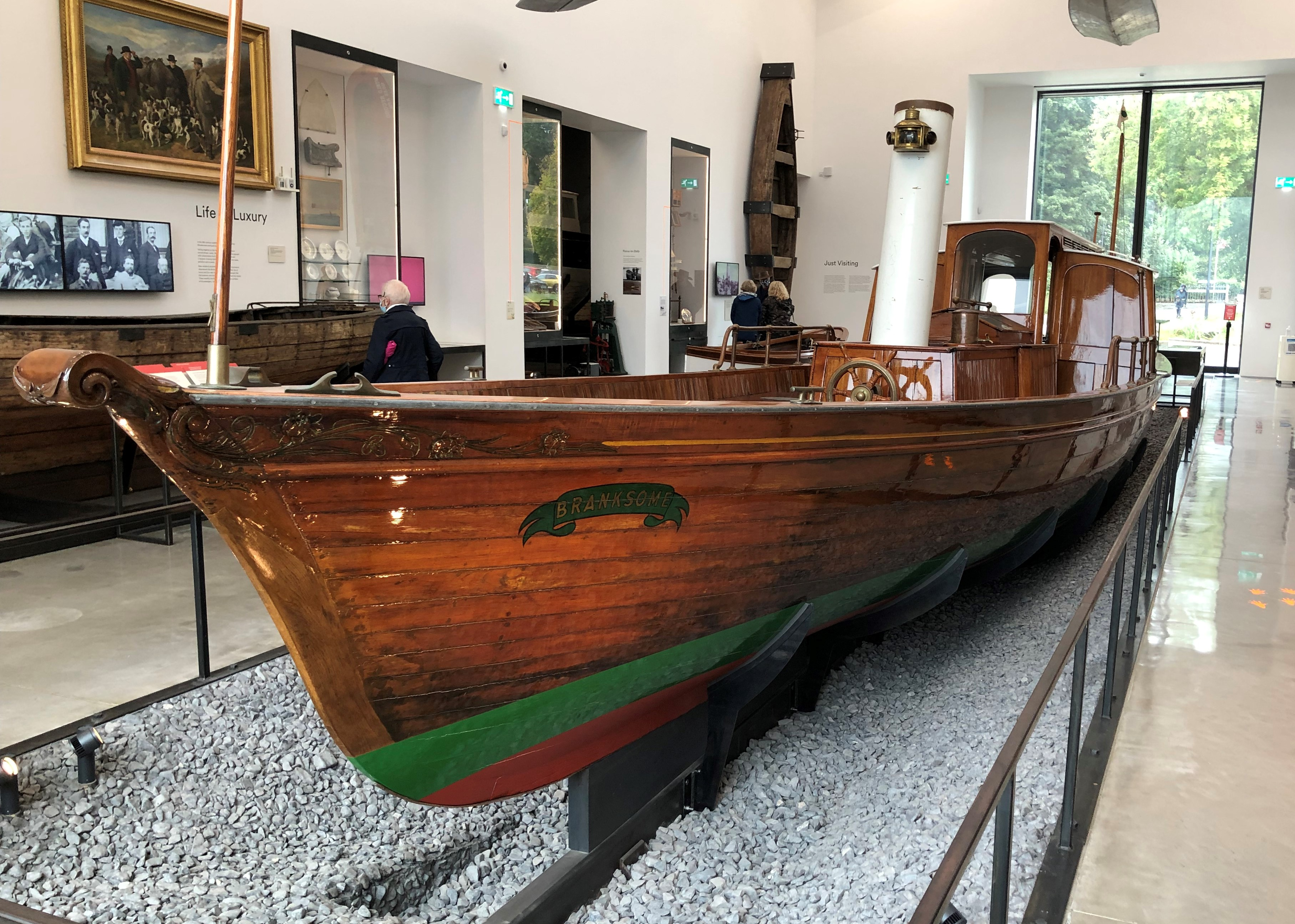
The steam launch Branksome, at the Windermere Jetty museum

Launch is a name given to several different types of boat. The wide range of usage of the name extends from utilitarian craft through to pleasure boats built to a very high standard.

In naval use, the launch was introduced as a ship's boat towards the end of the 17th century. On each warship, the launch was usually the largest boat out of those carried aboard. It could be propelled by oar or sail, with this type remaining in service into the 20th century. Steam launches were introduced on a trial basis in 1867, but as steam-powered ship's boats became more common, the majority were steam pinnaces.

Other military examples were the various motor launches used in the 20th century, employed for harbour defence, anti-submarine patrols, escorting coastal convoys, minesweeping and recovering aircrew from crashed aircraft. Generally these were decked boats, some of which were capable of fast speeds.

A powered boat operated by a regulatory or official organisation may be termed a launch, or a government launch – such as the police launch or a harbour-master's launch. The size, range and capabilities vary according to the precise role.

In private use, a launch is invariably a powered boat, using an electric motor, a steam, petrol or diesel engine. Some are built to a very high standard of finish, with large amounts of varnished hardwood and polished fittings. Various local historic types are kept in use by enthusiasts and museums.

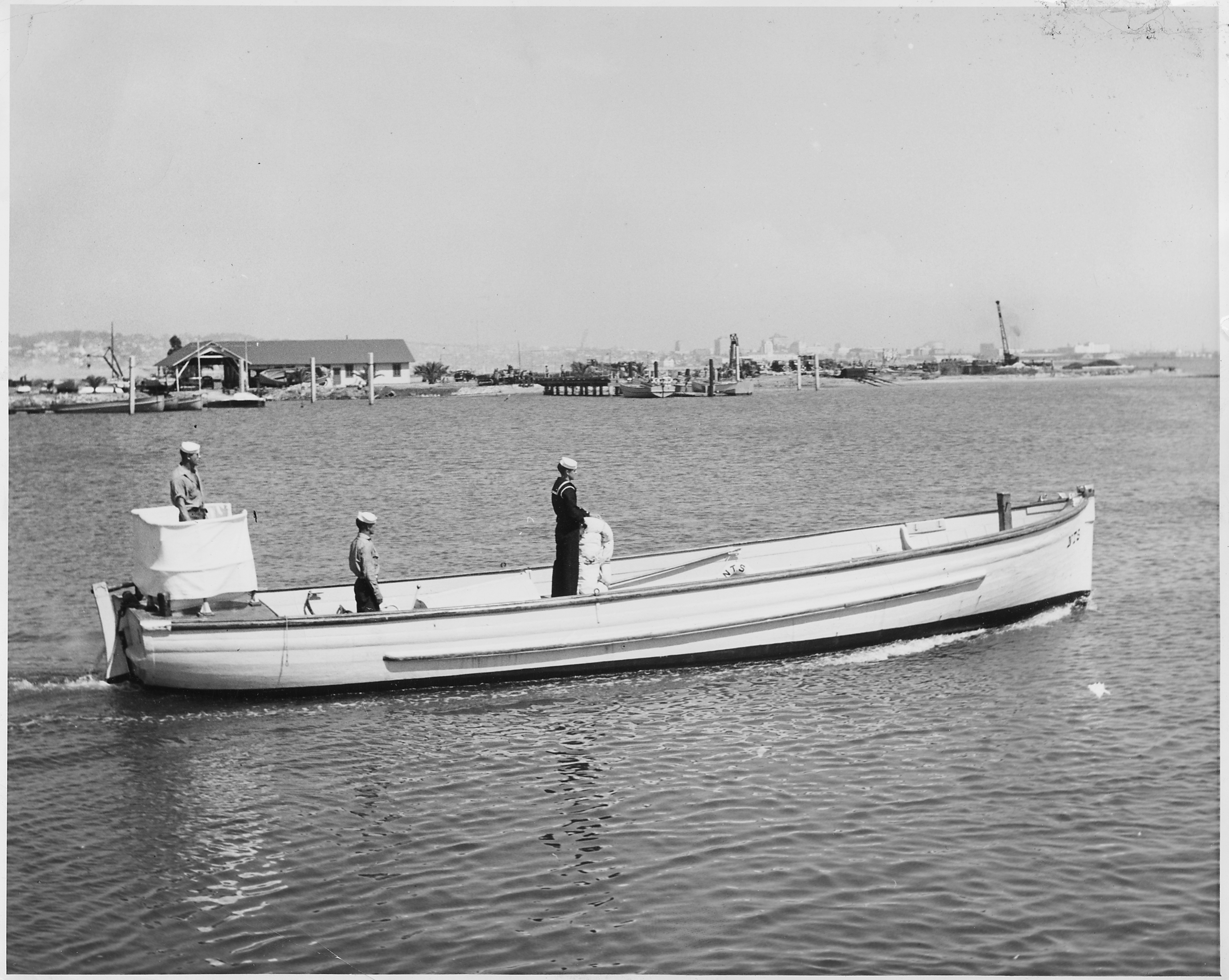
A US Navy launch of the 1940s

== Etymology ==
The word launch is derived from the Spanish lancha, which may be translated into English as "pinnace". It has been suggested that lancha is in turn derived from a Malay word Lancaran. The first instance of "launch" being used as a boat type in English was in 1697.

== History ==
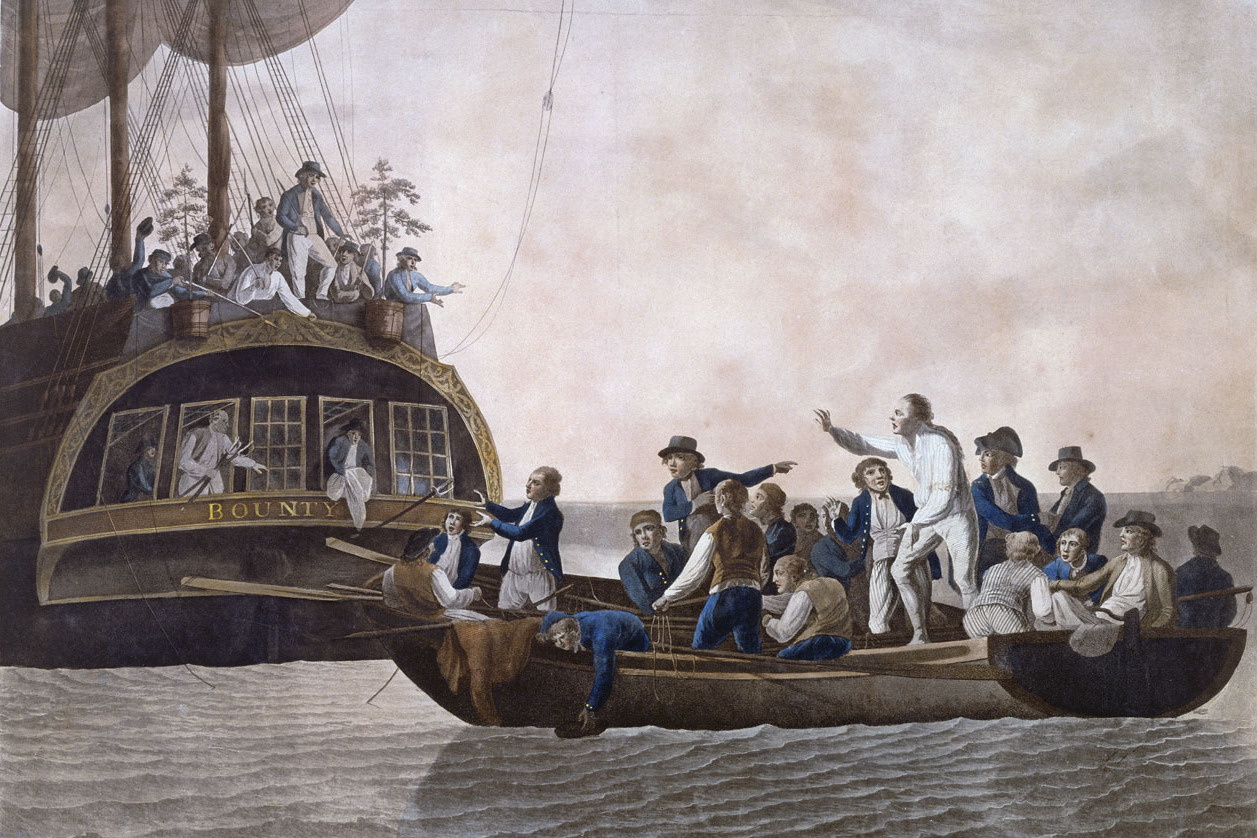
William Bligh being set adrift in HMS Bounty's launch

The launch steadily replaced the long-boat in the Royal Navy over the latter half of the 18th century. Both were usually the biggest boat carried by a warship or a merchant vessel in the Age of Sail. The transition from longboat to launch was influenced by the East India Company's successful experimentation with this change.

Launches were preferred as having greater carrying capacity, though they could be considered less seaworthy. One of two important roles was the carrying of drinking water. For example, a 33 ft (10 m) launch of 1804 could carry 14 large "leaguers" (barrels containing 150 imperial gallons (680 L) each), making a load of just over nine and half tonnes of water. A warship's launch would also be fitted with a windlass that allowed a ship's anchor to be carried or to be weighed (raised). This second essential role, generally for a ship's boat and specifically for the launch, was the laying out of anchors or weighing them after use. Before steam tugs were available, a ship's boat would often be used to kedge a ship out of a harbour or away from a hazard such as a lee shore, set a new anchor or inspect the cable if moored for a long time, among a range of "anchor work" tasks.

The launches issued to naval ships varied in size depending on the size of the ship they equipped. An 1815 schedule of ship's boats showed the range of 15 different lengths for launches from 34 ft (10 m) for a ship of 100 guns down to 16 ft (4.9 m) for a 200 ton sloop. As steam power became common in the navy, the need to transport drinking water (which could be distilled in the engine room) and transport anchors and cables to move a sailing ship both disappeared. By the last quarter of the 19th century, launches were only issued in one length, 42 feet (12.8 metres).

Launches had double-banked oars (Note: A double-banked boat has two oarsmen seated on each thwart, each operating their own oar on their side of the boat. This contrasts with a single-banked boat, with just one oarsman on each thwart operating a single oar, with the side on which the oars are worked alternating along the length of the boat.) The usual sailing rig for much of the 19th century was a two-masted ketch rig. A schooner rig was in use from 1878 and the de Horsey sloop rig was adopted from 1884.

During the Demak Sultanate attack on Portuguese Malacca of 1513, lancaran were used as armed troop transports for landing alongside penjajap and kelulus, as the Javanese junks were too large to approach shore.

In 1788 Captain William Bligh and 18 crewmen were set adrift by mutineers in HMS Bounty’s 23-foot (7 m) launch. Bligh navigated the open boat more than 4,000 miles, losing only one man – Tonga to Timor, 3,618 nmi (6,701 km; 4,164 mi).

== Use in the United Kingdom ==
=== Civilian use in the United Kingdom ===
On the River Thames the term "launch" is used to mean any motorised pleasure boat. The usage arises from the legislation governing the management of the Thames and laying down the categories of boats and the tolls for which they were liable.

=== Military use in the United Kingdom ===
Motor Launch was the designation for a type of vessel used in World War I and World War II by the Royal Navy and some other navies for inshore work defending harbours (Harbour defence motor launch) and defending the coast from submarines. The World War II boats were typically 60 to 115 feet (18 to 35 m) long and carried relatively light armament – a few depth charges, one or two small guns and a few machine guns.

The Royal Air Force used various boats to support flying boats and to rescue the crews of aircraft that had crashed at sea. The RAF High Speed Launches, such as the Type Two 63 ft HSL, of World War II were derivatives of motor torpedo boat designs.

== Sports ==
In competitive rowing the term "launch" is used to refer to any motorized boat used by the coach to follow practicing boats during workouts.

== See also ==
- RAF rescue launch
- Cabin cruiser
- Slipper launch
- Naphtha launch – Small motorboat used in the late-19th-century United States
- Picket boat, a naval launch
