= Bragozzo =

Wooden sailing boat

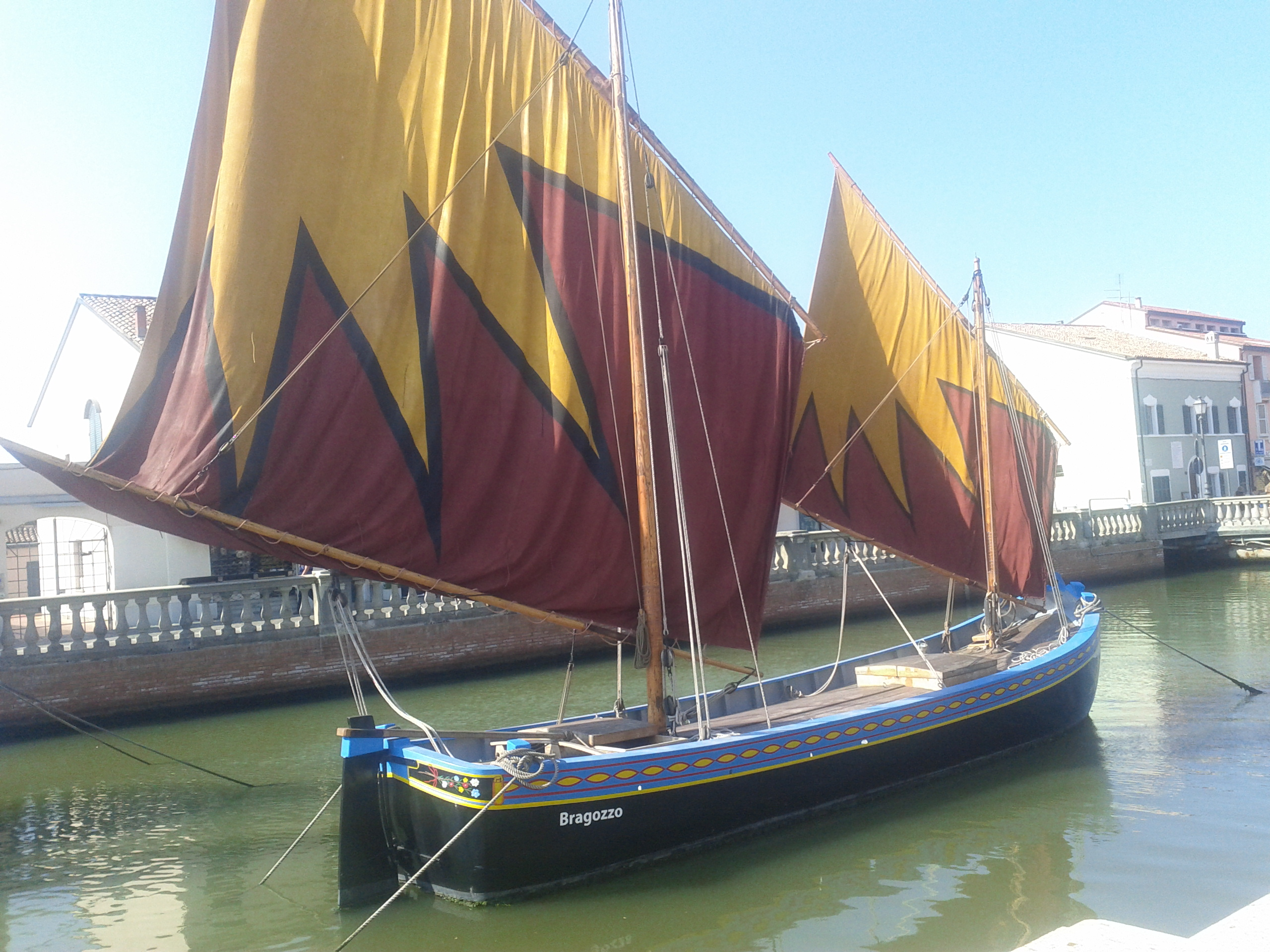
Bragozzo at Naval Museum of Cesenatico

A bragozzo (Croatian, Slovene: bragoc) was a type of wooden sailing boat from the Adriatic, very often used for fishing in the Istria and Kvarner gulfs. A typical crew was two or three men.

== Description ==
The hull of a bragozzo was wide, and it had no keel, instead having a flat bottom, below which was a large rudder. Because of this, it had a very shallow draft. The general shape of the boat began in a narrow bow which spread back towards a wide stern, with the final shape at the rear being rectangular. Its frame was generally made of oak while the planking was pine. The deck itself had a low railing.

A bragozzo had two masts, each a single piece, but no bowsprit. The forward of the masts was a short foremast from which was hung forward-leaning gaff sail with no lower boom. The larger main mast had one gaff sail with two booms, supporting three reefing positions.

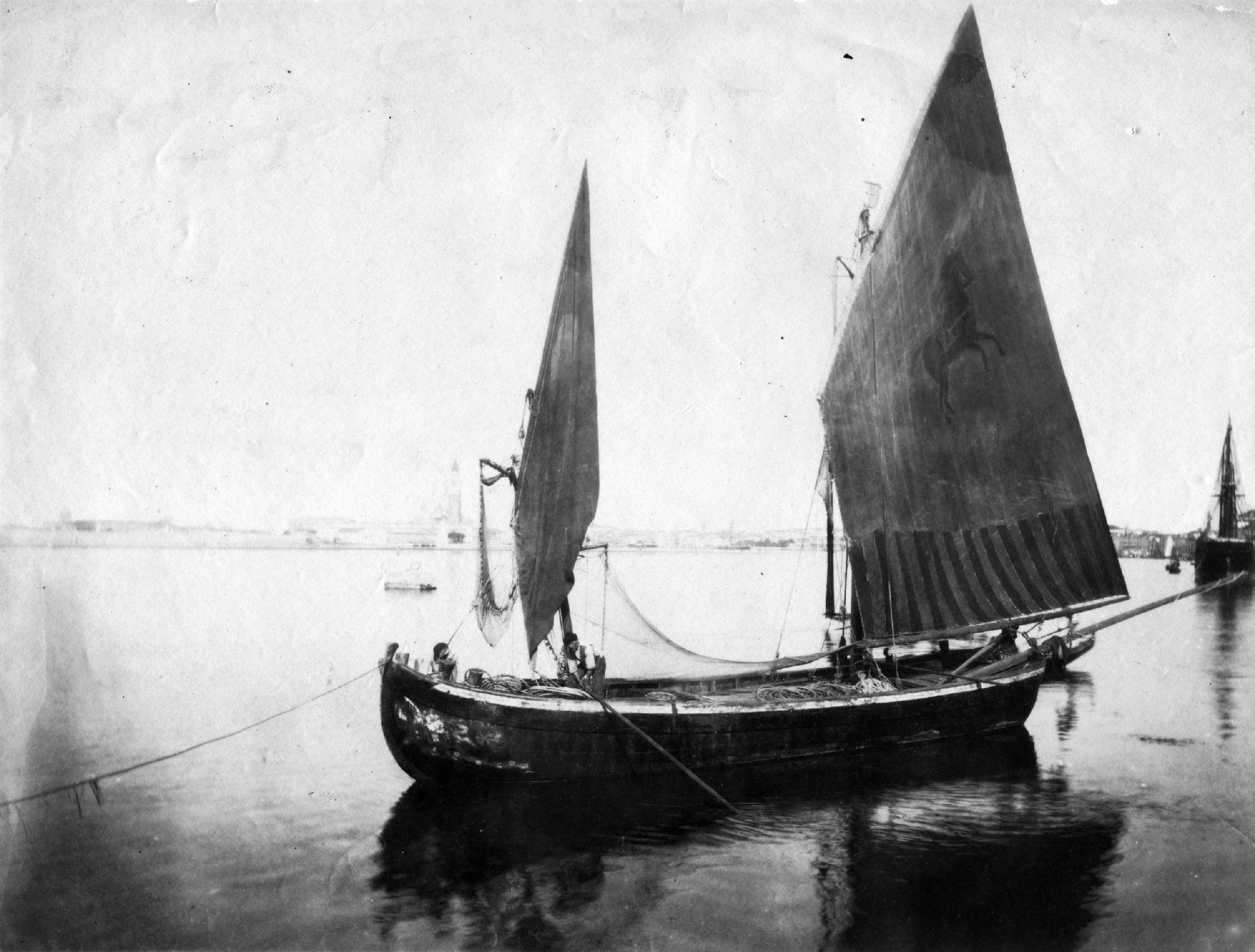
Bragozzo in Venice around 1900

The main cargo hatchway was located forward of the main mast. Additional hatchways were placed at the bow and stern. A bragozzo was typically 8 to 12 meters in length. Its freeboard was generally between 0.5 and 1 meter. It did not typically tow or carry a dinghy. Its dead-weight was in the range of 10 to 20 tons.

== Sources ==
- Flavij Bonin, Sailing boats in Slovenia, Ljubljana 2005. COBISS 220147456
