= Houario =

Small Mediterranean boat

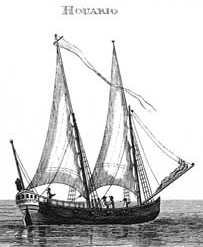
Engraving of a houario from The Elements and Practice of Rigging And Seamanship, 1794

A Houario is a small two masted lateen rigged coastal, litoral, or riverine craft of Mediterranean origin and use. These boats are often used as pleasure craft.
