= Small-craft sailing =

Type of watercraft sail

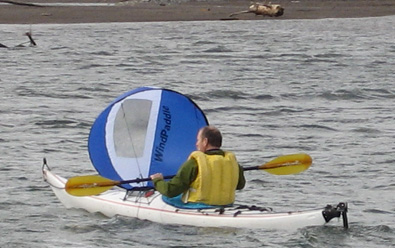
Sailing a Kayak on the Columbia River - Columbia Gorge, Oregon

Small-craft sails are sails designed to be attached to watercraft not conventionally equipped with sails, such as kayaks, canoes, or dinghies. Depending upon wind conditions, they can augment the user's paddling or rowing effort, or replace it. They are suited to touring and other long-distance usage.
