= Tjotter =

Sailing ship

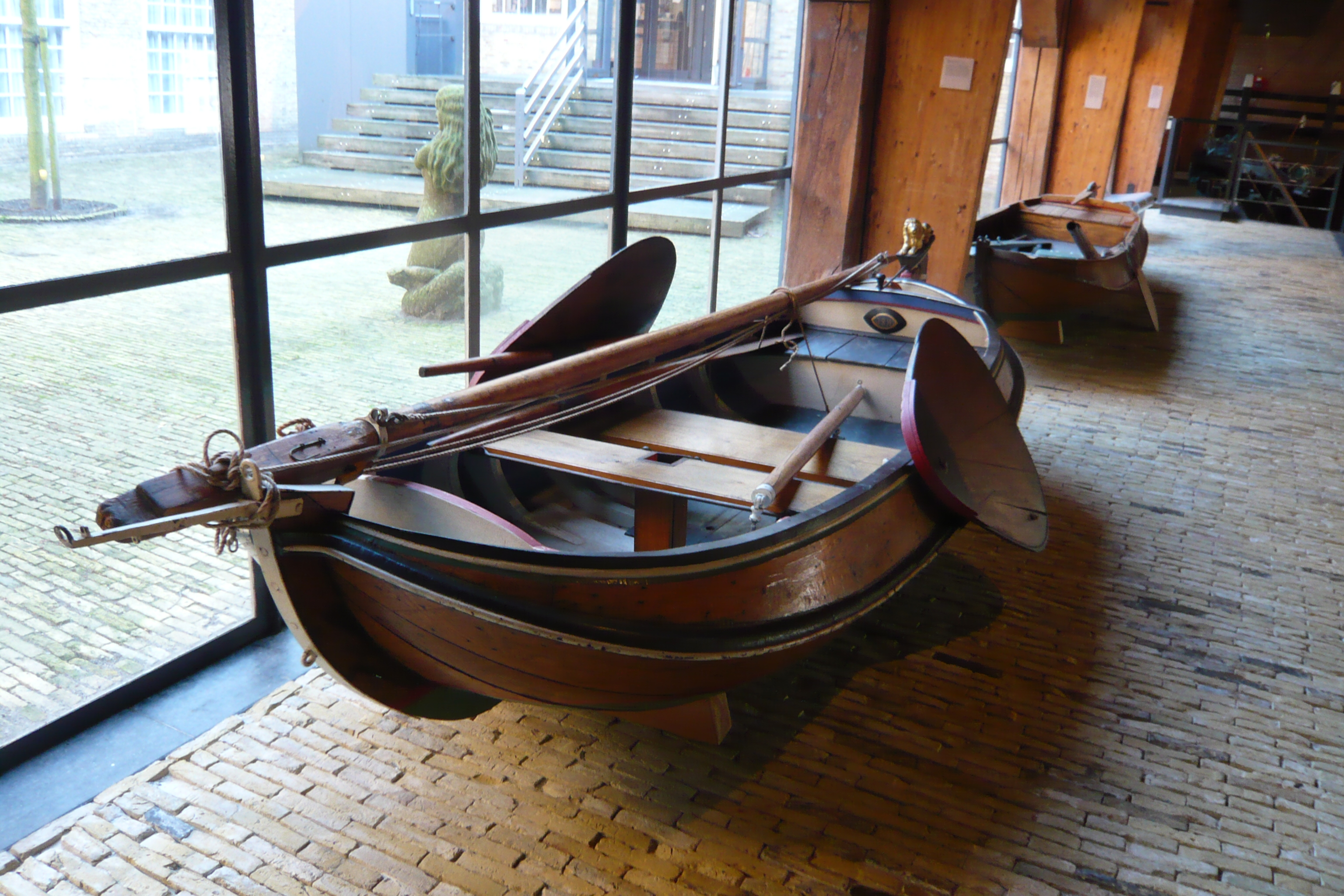
Tjotter "Hou Moed" from 1887 in the Zuiderzeemuseum

A tjotter is the smallest of the open round Fries sailing ships with a length on the stern not exceeding 5.4 metres (17 ft 9 in).

The ship has no roundwood and it has a wide helm. The head of the rudder is usually decorated with a sculpture, sometimes in the form of a bird.

Originally, the tjotter was used in Friesland, a province in the northern part of the Netherlands, for small-scale transport of goods and people at a time when there were few roads. A tjotter with the size 4.8 by 2.4 metres (15 ft 9 in × 7 ft 10 in) in Friesland is called a "fjouwer-yacht". At the wharf of Pier Piersma, fjouwer-yachts are still commonly built.

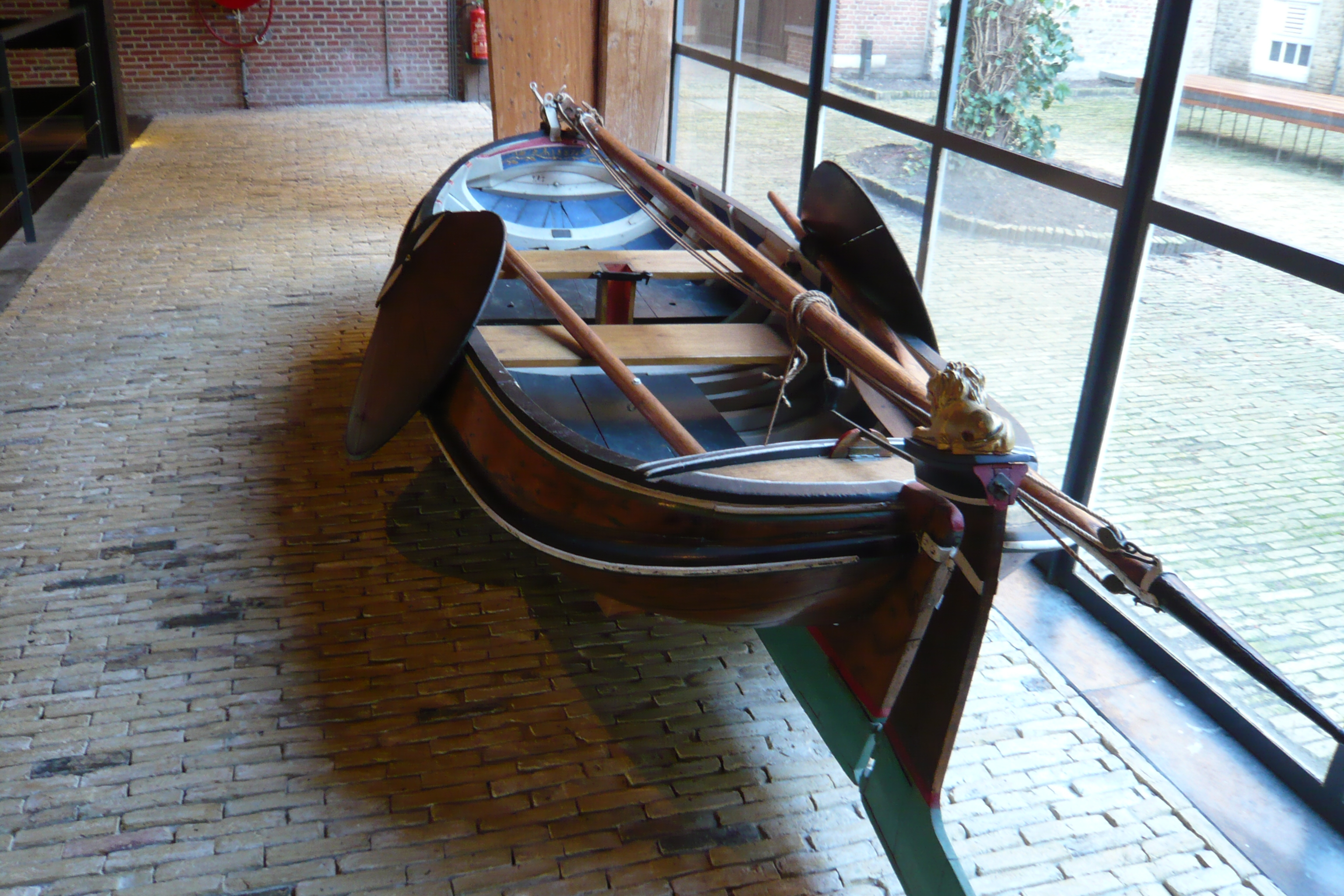
Hou Moed from the stern

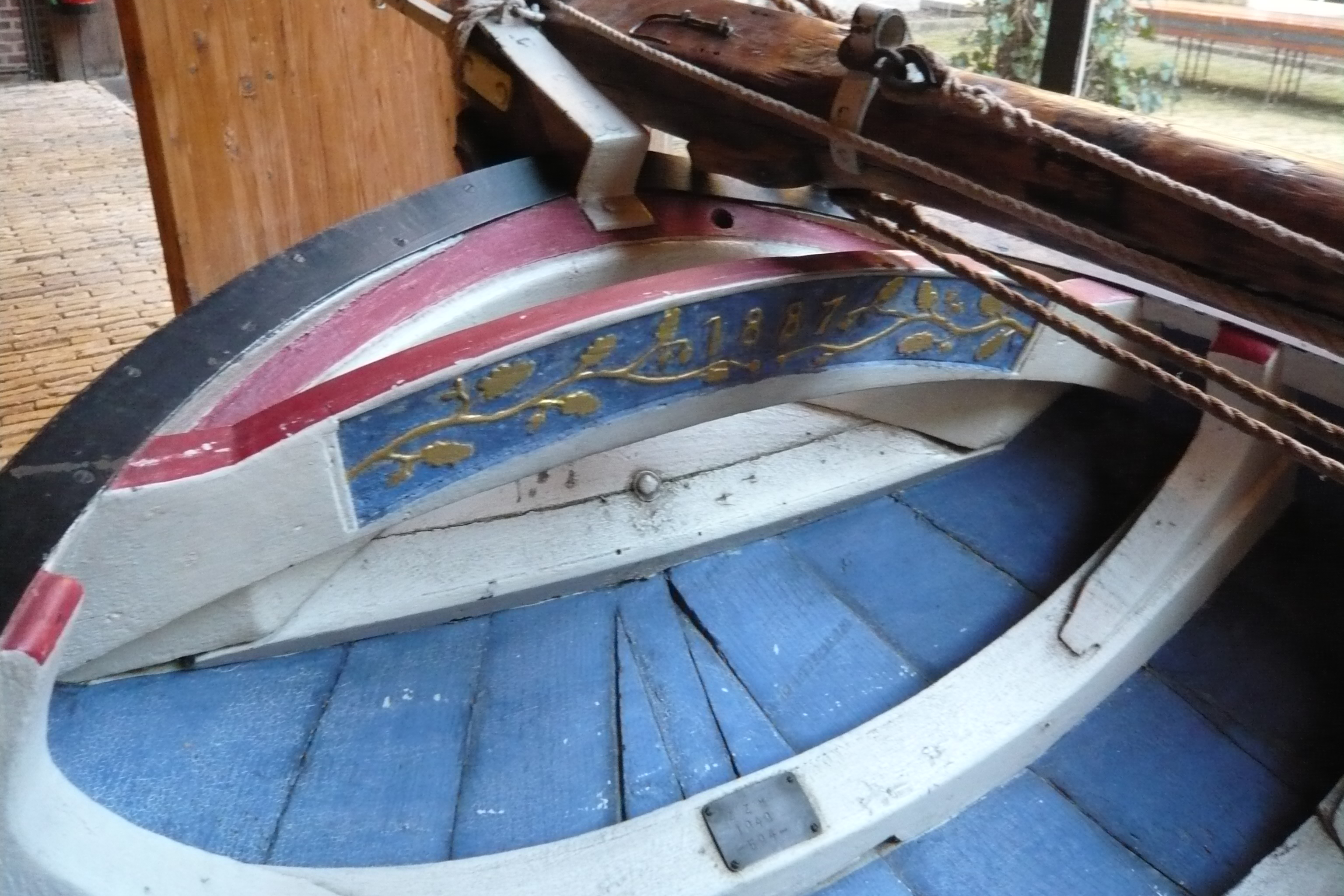
Carved date 1887
