= Slipper launch =

A slipper launch is a traditional River Thames pleasure boat, normally of wooden construction, to seat between four and eight passengers. The term 'slipper launch' derives from the distinctive sloping shape of the stern. The very flat underwater run aft is intended to minimise wash.

The original builder of these craft was Andrews Boathouses of Bourne End with the 1913 prototype 'Merk' being designed to be as much like a car as possible (and was named after a Mercedes car). She was designed to be a 'motorists boat' with straight stem, flat sides and flat bottom all designed to minimise wash and to look like the racing cars of the day. This boat, now in the collection of the National Maritime Museum, Cornwall, was owned at one time by Arthur Whitten Brown, famous, with John Alcock, for the first non-stop transatlantic flight in 1919.

The main changes to the design known best today came through from Andrews in the 1930s when the virtually flat-bottomed design was changed to a hard chine with a deep 'V' bow section and typically built to 25 or 30ft, although there were some 50ft slippers built. These launches were marketed by Andrews as Greyhound Launches and were typically powered by Ford Watermota or Morris/BMC Vedette engines. Andrews also exhibited at the National Boat Show regularly, including the first boat show in 1954 where they exhibited a 25ft greyhound launch 'M.L. Greyhound'.

Around the 1930s Meakes of Marlow started also producing slipper launches, recognisable by the bow section being almost perpendicular to the water, as seen in the photos of Mayflower below.

In the 1960s and 1970s, launches were also built by Alf Parrott at Henley-on-Thames. Alf Parrott slipper launches were initially built in marine ply, then later in fibreglass, 20 feet (6.1 m) in length, with Stuart Turner single-cylinder petrol engines. Peter Freebody and Co. in Hurley, Berkshire still make slipper launches from scratch using traditional methods and materials although often with electric propulsion.

Whilst slipper launches used to be a much more common sight (and used to be available for hire from Andrews), Alf Parrott, Meakes and Andrews launches can all still be seen on the River Thames, most often (though not exclusively) in the middle Thames between Windsor and Reading. Most slipper launches are now privately owned, but some may be hired for a day through skippered charter.

Slipper launches have been owned by many famous names, including one by the British 1950s singing trio, the Beverley Sisters, Keith Moon, and another by Louis Renault, of car company fame.

== Construction and hull architecture ==
During a renovation project the hull shape and construction can be viewed along with the rarely seen framing of the slipper stern.

The hull boards and stringers sealing the gap between covering each plank are made from mahogany. Lateral frames spaced at approximately one metre centres are formed from oak. The deck over is constructed of afromosia with multiple layers of varnish providing a furniture-like finish.

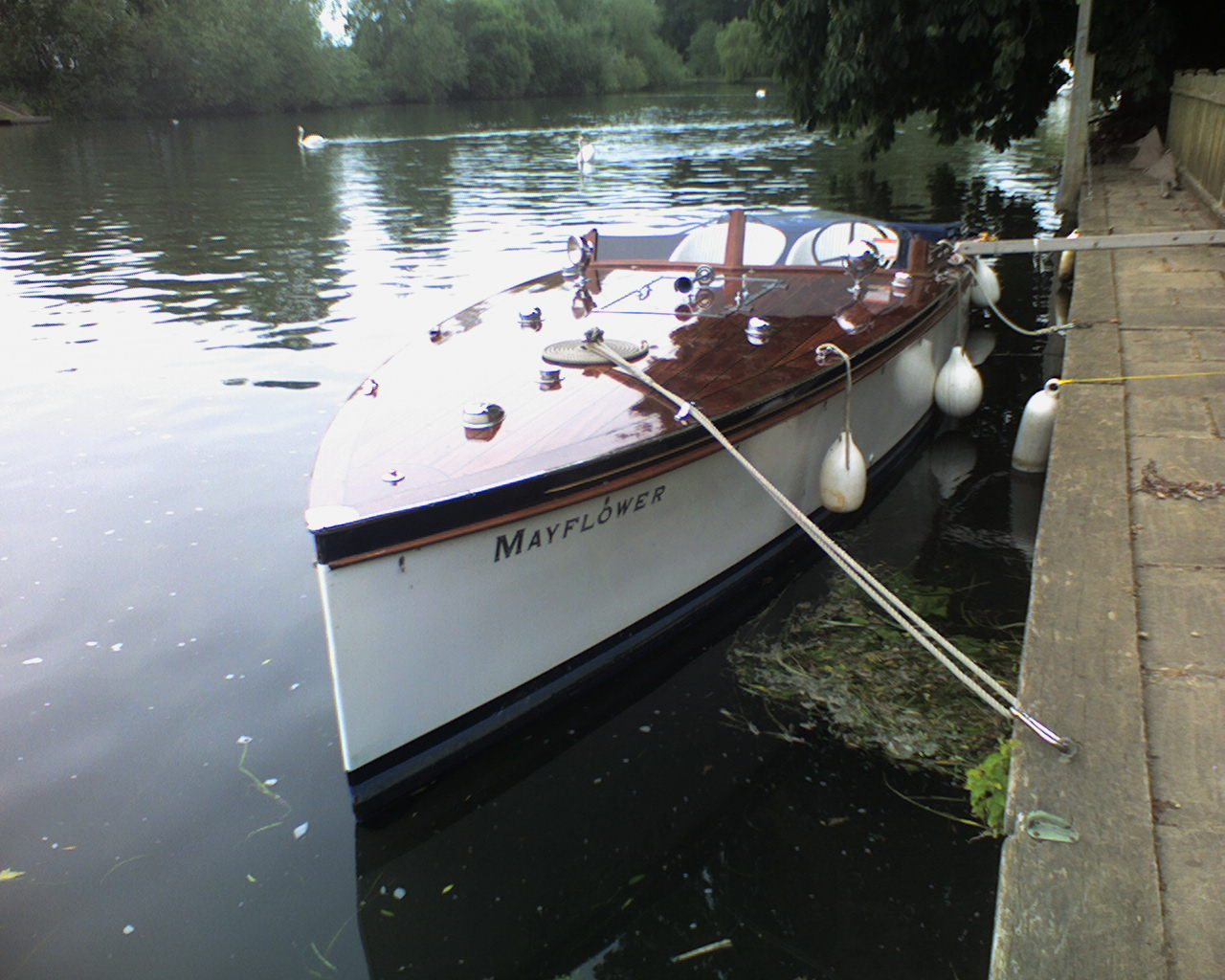
Mayflower - a 1934 Meakes launch reputedly once owned by Keith Moon

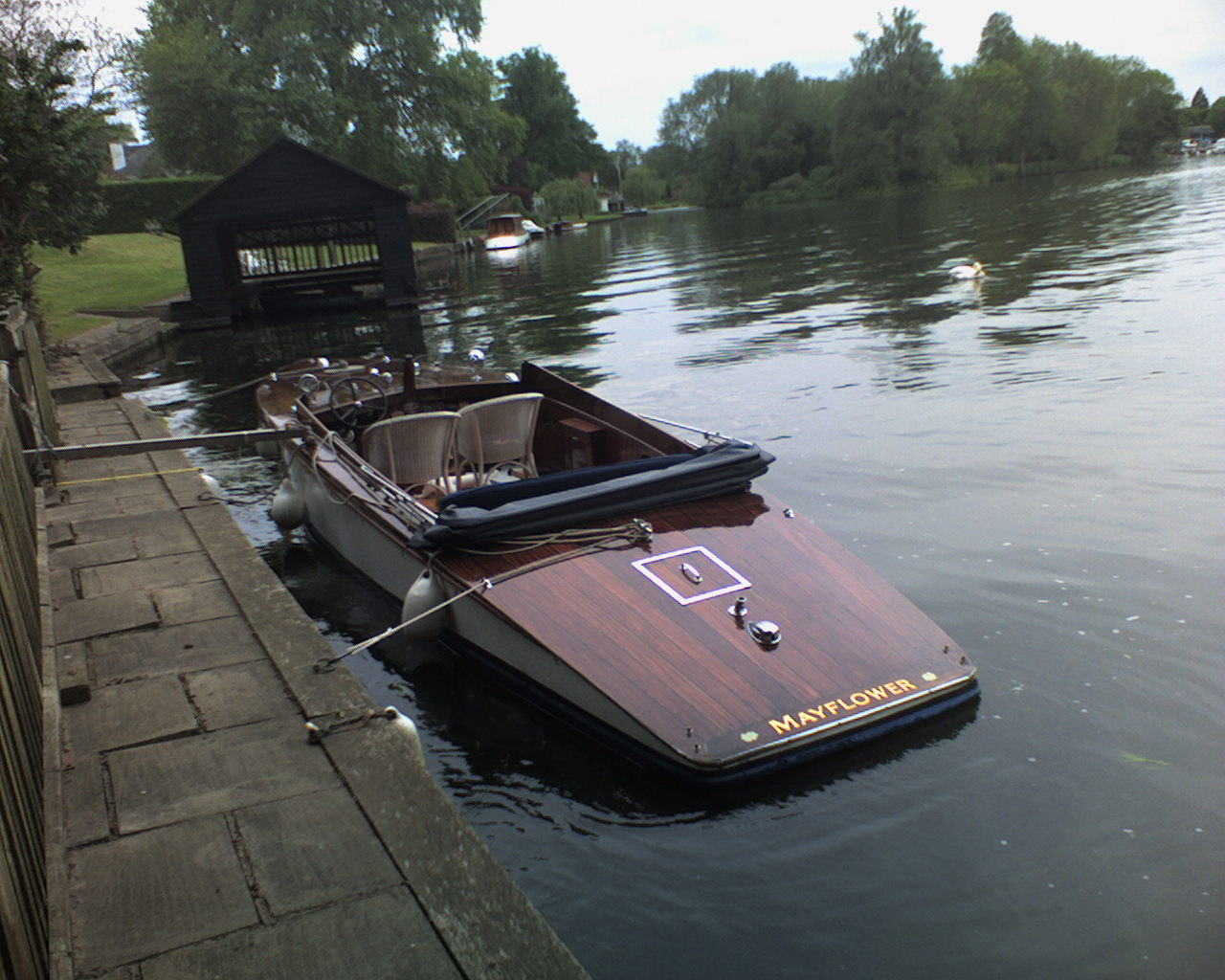
Mayflower - a view of the slipper stern
