= Jeanneau Yachts 65 =

Sailboat class

Development
- Designer: Philippe Briand; Andrew Winch; Jeanneau Design Office
- Location: France
- Year: 2022
- Builder: Jeanneau
- Role: Cruiser
- Name: Jeanneau Yachts 65

Boat
- Displacement: 68,343 lb (31,000 kg)
- Draft: 9.68 ft (2.95 m)

Hull
- Type: monohull
- Construction: Vacuum infused hull, balsa and polyester fiberglass sandwich
- LOA: 66.27 ft (20.20 m)
- LWL: 59.06 ft (18.00 m)
- Beam: 17.72 ft (5.40 m)
- Engine: Volvo D4-175 175 hp (130 kW) diesel engine

Hull appendages
- Keel: fin keel
- Ballast: 20,613 lb (9,350 kg)
- Rudder: spade-type rudder

Rig
- Rig type: Bermuda rig

Sails
- Sailplan: fractional rigged sloop
- Mainsail area: 968.75 sq ft (90.000 m^{2})
- Jib/genoa area: 861.11 sq ft (80.000 m^{2})
- Total sail area: 1,829.86 sq ft (170.000 m^{2}) with mast-furling mainsail and jib 2,271 sq ft (211.0 m^{2}) with full-batten mainsail and 110% Genoa

The Jeanneau Yachts 65, also called the Jeanneau 65, is a French blue water cruising sailboat, that was first built in 2022. The hull was designed by Philippe Briand, the interior by Andrew Winch and finishing by the Jeanneau Design Office.

The design was introduced at the 2022 Cannes Yachting Festival. It replaced the Jeanneau Yachts 64 in production.

== Production ==
The design has been built at the Groupe Beneteau shipyard in Monfalcone, Italy, since in 2022 and remained in production in 2023.

== Design ==
The Jeanneau Yachts 65 is a recreational keelboat, built predominantly of fiberglass, with wood trim. It has a vacuum infused hull, with balsa and polyester fiberglass sandwich construction. It has a 9/10 fractional sloop rig with a bowsprit, an over-plumb stem, a reverse transom, with an electrically operated tailgate swimming platform and dinghy garage, an internally mounted spade-type rudder controlled by dual stainless steel leather-covered wheels and a fixed L-shaped fin keel with a weighted bulb or optional shoal-draft keel. The fin keel model displaces 68,343 lb (31,000 kg) empty and carries 20,613 lb (9,350 kg) of cast iron ballast, while the shoal draft version carries 23,259 lb (10,550 kg) of ballast.

The boat has a draft of 9.68 ft (2.95 m) with the standard keel and 7.17 ft (2.19 m) with the optional shoal draft keel.

A solid, hard-top bimini top is an option.

The boat is fitted with a Swedish Volvo D4-175 diesel engine of 175 hp (130 kW) for docking and maneuvering. The fuel tank holds 218 U.S. gallons (830 L; 182 imp gal) and the fresh water tank has a capacity of 264 U.S. gallons (1,000 L; 220 imp gal).

The design has been built with a number of semi-custom interior arrangements. A typical two-cabin interior has sleeping accommodation for four people, with a double island berth in the forward cabin, a U-shaped settee and a straight settee in the main cabin and an aft cabin with a double island berth. The galley is located on the port side at the companionway ladder. The galley is J-shaped with an island and is equipped with a four-burner stove, a refrigerator/freezer and a double sink. A navigation station is opposite the galley, on the starboard side. There are two heads, one just forward of the bow cabin and one on the starboard side in the aft cabin. Cabin headroom is 6.20 ft (189 cm).

== Operational history ==
The boat is supported by an active class club, the Jeanneau Owners Network.

== See also ==
- List of sailing boat types
