= Jeanneau Yachts 55 =

Sailboat class

Development
- Designer: Philippe Briand; Andrew Winch; Jeanneau Design Office
- Location: France
- Year: 2023
- Builder: Jeanneau
- Role: Cruiser
- Name: Jeanneau Yachts 55

Boat
- Displacement: 49,878 lb (22,624 kg)
- Draft: 8.04 ft (2.45 m)

Hull
- Type: monohull
- Construction: fiberglass
- LOA: 55.54 ft (16.93 m)
- LWL: 52.66 ft (16.05 m)
- Beam: 16.37 ft (4.99 m)
- Engine: Yanmar 110 hp (82 kW) diesel engine

Hull appendages
- Keel: fin keel with weighted bulb
- Ballast: 10,803 lb (4,900 kg)
- Rudder: spade-type rudder

Rig
- Rig type: Bermuda rig

Sails
- Sailplan: fractional rigged sloop
- Mainsail area: 775 sq ft (72.0 m^{2}) (furling), 882 sq ft (81.9 m^{2}) (full batten)
- Jib/genoa area: 635 sq ft (59.0 m^{2})
- Gennaker area: 2,690 sq ft (250 m^{2})
- Other sails: 110% genoa: 829 sq ft (77.0 m^{2})
- Total sail area: 1,410.07 sq ft (131.000 m^{2})

The Jeanneau Yachts 55 is a French blue water cruising sailboat, first built in 2023. The hull was designed by Philippe Briand, the interior by Andrew Winch and finishing by the Jeanneau Design Office.

The boat was introduced at the 2023 Düsseldorf boat show.

== Production ==
The design has been built by Jeanneau in France, since 2023 and remains in production.

== Design ==
The Jeanneau Yachts 55 is a recreational keelboat, built predominantly of vacuum-infused fiberglass, with wood trim. It has a fractional sloop rig with a bowsprit, an over-plumb stem, a reverse transom with a drop-down tailgate swimming platform, dual internally mounted spade-type rudders controlled by dual wheels located forward in the cockpit and a fixed L-shaped fin keel with a weighted bulb or optional shoal-draft keel. The mainsheet is located on a fiberglass cockpit arch. The fin keel model displaces 40,878 lb (18,542 kg) and carries 10,803 lb (4,900 kg) of cast iron ballast, while the shoal draft version carries 12,522 lb (5,680 kg) of ballast.

A rigid bimini top is a factory option.

The boat has a draft of 8.04 ft (2.45 m) with the standard keel and 6.25 ft (1.91 m) with the optional shoal draft keel.

The boat is fitted with a Japanese Yanmar diesel engine of 110 hp (82 kW) for docking and maneuvering. The fuel tank holds 61 U.S. gallons (230 L; 51 imp gal) and the fresh water tank has a capacity of 201 U.S. gallons (760 L; 167 imp gal).

The design has a unique three cabin interior layout available, with sleeping accommodation for six people. It has a double island berth in the forward cabin, an L-shaped settee and two seats in the salon and two aft cabins, each with a double berth. A small crew cabin can also be fitted in the bow. The aft cabins have their own steps to the cockpit and are not connected to the main salon. The galley is located on the starboard side just forward of the companionway ladder. The galley is of a straight configuration, with an island and is equipped with a stove, an ice box and a double sink. There are three heads, one in each cabin. Cabin headroom is 6.63 ft (202 cm).

For sailing downwind the design may be equipped with an asymmetrical spinnaker of 2,690 sq ft (250 m^{2}).

== Operational history ==
The boat is supported by an active class club the Jeanneau Owners Network.

In a 2023 review for Yachting News, Silvia Pretto wrote, "the lines are modern, fresh and captivating, and the deck plan has been completely revolutionized: an advanced and truly impressive dual cockpit, a huge relaxation area aft with two sofas, one U-shaped and one L-shaped, that turn into large sunbathing areas. The stern opens electrically to reveal a large interior compartment from which the bathing platform also originates, providing easy access to the sea for guests on board."

== See also ==
- List of sailing boat types
