= Alaiya (yacht) =

Luxury yacht

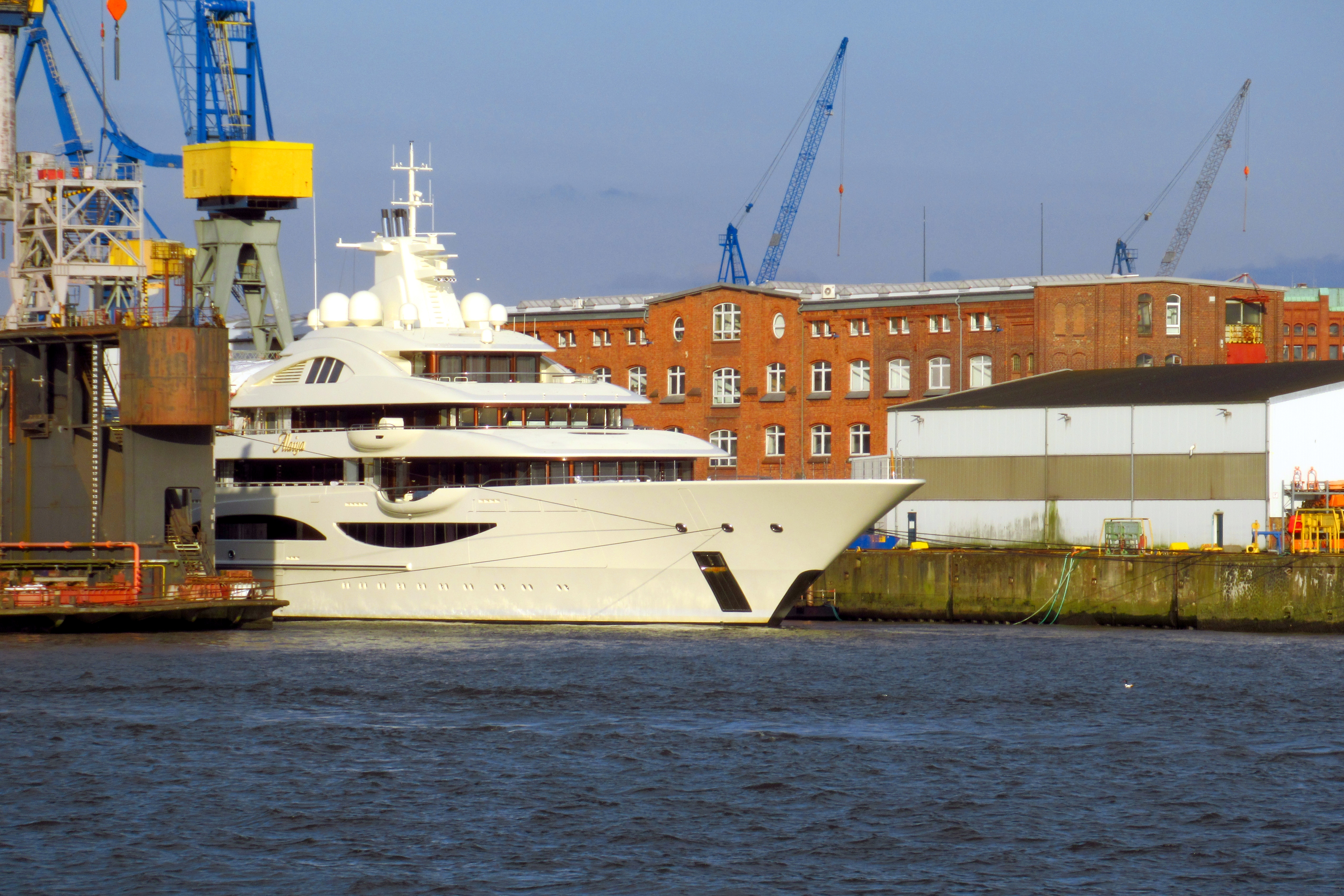
- Alaiya at the Blohm + Voss shipyard in Hamburg

History

Cayman Islands
- Name: Alaiya
- Owner: Lakshmi Mittal
- Builder: Lürssen
- Launched: 2018
- In service: 2019
- Identification: IMO number: 1013016; MMSI number: 319165800; Callsign: ZGIU5
- Status: Refurbished at Blohm+Voss

General characteristics
- Class & type: Motor yacht
- Tonnage: 4,699 GT
- Length: 111.50 m (365.8 ft)
- Beam: 16.85 m (55.3 ft)
- Draught: 4.30 m (14.1 ft)
- Propulsion: 2x 4,963hp MTU (20V 4000 M73L) diesel engines
- Speed: 18 knots (33 km/h) (maximum); 12 knots (22 km/h) (cruising)
- Capacity: 18 passengers
- Crew: 38

Alaiya is a luxury yacht launched by Lürssen at their yard near Rendsburg in 2018 owned by Indian steel magnate billionaire Lakshmi Mittal. Both the yacht's exterior and interior design are the work of Winch Design.

== Design ==
The hull is built out of steel while the superstructure is made out of aluminium with teak laid decks. The yacht is classed by Lloyd's Register and flagged in the Cayman Islands.

=== Amenities ===
Zero speed stabilizers, gym, elevator, swimming pool, movie theatre, tender garage with a Wajer 38S 11.30 m (37.1 ft) utility tender, a Wasjer 38L 11.30 m (37.1 ft) limousine tenders, swimming platform, air conditioning, BBQ, beach club, spa room, helicopter landing pad, underwater lights, beauty salon.

=== Performance ===
She is powered by twin 4,963 hp MTU (20V 4000 M73L) diesel engines. The engines power two propellers, which in turn propel the ship to a top speed of 18 knots (33 km/h). At a cruising speed of 12 knots (22 km/h), her maximum range is 7,000 nmi (13,000 km).

== Owners ==
Owner	Yacht name	Period owned	Source
Alexei Fedorychev	TIS	2019	
Lürssen	TIS	2019–2020	
Alisher Usmanov	Lady Gulya	2020–2021	
Lakshmi Mittal	Alaiya	2021–present	

== See also ==
- List of motor yachts by length
- List of yachts built by Lürssen
