= Radiant (yacht) =

2009 megayacht

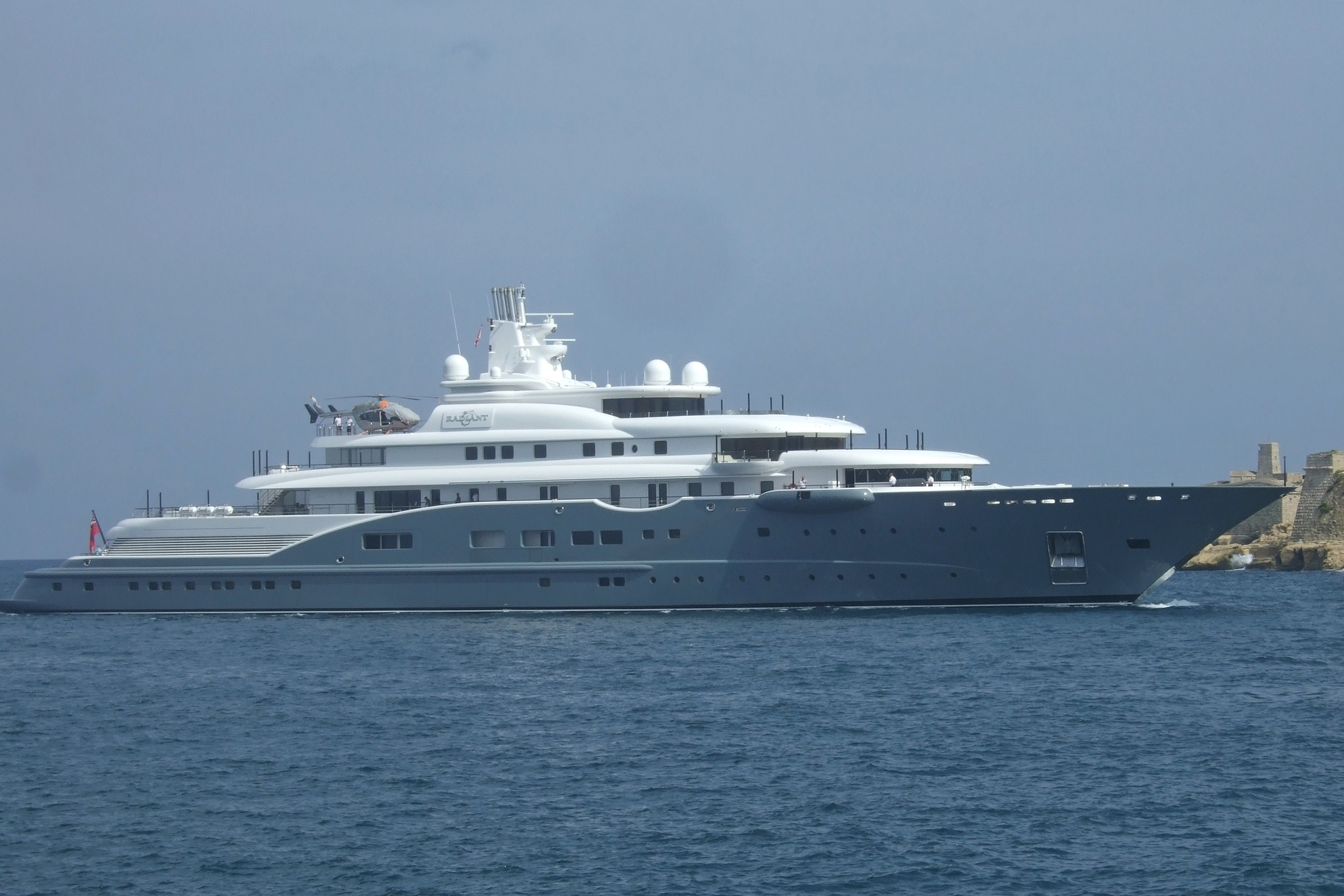

History

Cayman Islands
- Name: Radiant
- Operator: Abdulla Al Futtaim
- Builder: Lürssen
- Launched: 2009
- In service: 2010
- Notes: IMO number: 9571105; MMSI number: 319012900; Call sign: ZCYY2

General characteristics
- Class & type: Megayacht
- Tonnage: 5027 gross tons
- Length: 110.00 m (360.89 ft)
- Beam: 16.30 m (53.5 ft)
- Draught: 4.40 m (14.4 ft)
- Propulsion: Twin 8,715hp MTU 16V 1163 TB73L
- Speed: 21 knots (39 km/h) (maximum); 16 knots (30 km/h) (cruising)
- Capacity: 20 passengers
- Crew: 44

Radiant, formerly known as Darius, is a motor yacht built in 2009 by Lürssen. With an overall length of 110.00 m (360.89 ft) and a beam of 16.00 m (52.49 ft), she is owned by Emirati billionaire Abdulla Al Futtaim.

== Design ==
Radiant's exterior was designed by Tim Heywood and her interior by Glen Pushelburg. The hull is built of steel and the superstructure is made of aluminium, with teak laid decks. The yacht is registered in the Cayman Islands.

=== Amenities ===
Zero speed stabilizers, elevator, swimming pool, beach club, helicopter landing pad on the top deck, massage room, swimming platform, tender garage with tender, air conditioning, on deck Jacuzzi, gym, and movie theatre.

=== Engines ===
She is powered by twin 8,715 hp MTU 16V 1163 TB73L diesel engines. She has 360,000 L (95,000 US gal) fuel tanks.

== History ==
=== Court case ===
After her delivery there was a lawsuit against the previous owner who sold the yacht to Abdulla Al Futtaim in 2008. He failed to pay a commission fee to the broker, Edmiston. The judge ruled in favour of Edmiston, ruling that the yacht owner should pay Edmiston their commission.

== See also ==
- Al Raya
- Luxury yacht
- List of motor yachts by length
- List of yachts built by Lürssen
