= Jeanneau Yachts 54 =

Sailboat class

Development
- Designer: Philippe Briand; Andrew Winch; Jeanneau Design Office
- Location: France
- Year: 2015
- Builder: Jeanneau
- Role: Cruiser
- Name: Jeanneau Yachts 54

Boat
- Displacement: 37,840 lb (17,164 kg)
- Draft: 7.35 ft (2.24 m)

Hull
- Type: monohull
- Construction: fiberglass
- LOA: 53.02 ft (16.16 m)
- LWL: 46.75 ft (14.25 m)
- Beam: 16.14 ft (4.92 m)
- Engine: Yanmar 75 or 110 hp (56 or 82 kW) diesel engine

Hull appendages
- Keel: fin keel with weighted bulb
- Ballast: 10,240 lb (4,645 kg)
- Rudder: spade-type rudder

Rig
- Rig type: Bermuda rig
- I foretriangle height: 63.09 ft (19.23 m)
- J foretriangle base: 21.78 ft (6.64 m)
- P mainsail luff: 58.99 ft (17.98 m)
- E mainsail foot: 19.06 ft (5.81 m)

Sails
- Sailplan: 9/10 fractional rigged sloop
- Mainsail area: 646 sq ft (60.0 m^{2}) or 516 sq ft (47.9 m^{2}) furling
- Jib/genoa area: 109% genoa: 678 sq ft (63.0 m^{2})
- Gennaker area: 2,120 sq ft (197 m^{2})
- Other sails: Code 0: 1,162 sq ft (108.0 m^{2})
- Upwind sail area: 1,324 sq ft (123.0 m^{2})
- Downwind sail area: 2,766 sq ft (257.0 m^{2})

The Jeanneau Yachts 54, also known as the Jeanneau 54, is a French blue water cruising sailboat, that was first built in 2015. The hull was designed by Philippe Briand, the interior by Andrew Winch and the finishing work by the Jeanneau Design Office.

== Production ==
The design was built by Jeanneau in France, starting in 2015, but it is now out of production.

== Design ==
The Jeanneau Yachts 54 is a recreational keelboat, built predominantly of polyester fiberglass, with wood trim. The hull is a balsa-fiberglass vacuum infused sandwich, while the deck is PVC-fiberglass vacuum infused sandwich. It has a 9/10 fractional sloop rig, with a deck-stepped mast, two sets of swept spreaders and aluminum spars with discontinuous stainless steel wire rigging. The hull has a plumb stem, a reverse transom with a drop-down tailgate-style swimming platform, an internally mounted spade-type rudder controlled by dual wheels and a fixed L-shaped fin keel with a weighted bulb, or optional shoal-draft keel. The fin keel model displaces 37,840 lb (17,164 kg) empty and carries 10,240 lb (4,645 kg) of cast iron ballast, while the shoal-draft keel version displaces 38,581 lb (17,500 kg) and carries 10,979 lb (4,980 kg) of cast iron ballast.

The boat has a draft of 7.35 ft (2.24 m) with the standard keel and 5.75 ft (1.75 m) with the optional shoal draft keel.

The boat is fitted with a Japanese Yanmar diesel engine of 75 or 110 hp (56 or 82 kW) gasoline engine for docking and maneuvering. The fuel tank holds 63 or 127 U.S. gallons (240 or 480 L; 52 or 106 imp gal) and the fresh water tank has a capacity of 191 or 255 U.S. gallons (720 or 970 L; 159 or 212 imp gal).

The design was built with a number of interior configurations, with sleeping accommodation for four to nine people. A typical layout has a double island berth in the bow cabin, a U-shaped settee and a straight settee in the main cabin and an aft cabin with a double berth on the port side. Both the bow and stern cabins may be divided to provide extra bunks. The galley may be located on the port side, amidships, or just aft of the companionway ladder on the starboard side. In either location the galley is a straight configuration and is equipped with a three-burner stove, an ice box and a double sink. A navigation station is located on the starboard side. The boat may be equipped with two to four heads, depending on the number of bunks fitted. Cabin maximum headroom is 78 in (198 cm).

For sailing downwind the design may be equipped with an asymmetrical spinnaker of 2,120 sq ft (197 m^{2}), or a code 0 of 1,163 sq ft (108.0 m^{2}).

The design has a hull speed of 9.16 kn (16.96 km/h).

== Operational history ==
The boat is supported by an active class club, the Jeanneau Owners Network.

In a 2016 review for Yachting World, Toby Hodges wrote, "With the equivalent of a deep reef in the in-mast mainsail and three rolls in the 106 per cent genoa, we power-reached around the Bay of Cannes, regularly at double-figure speeds. And it was really howling when we headed out to sea later that afternoon, where we met 35 knots and sharp seas round the back of the Lerin islands. As conditions got a little spicy off the monastery, we spun the 54 around to return with the 1.5m waves – and bang, she absolutely powered up. On one downhill run, we raised full main to sail full bore on a broad reach with the swell. At 12 knots this 17-tonne yacht starts to plane. When we slid onto a wave we could clock up to 14 knots. Not the sort of family cruising she is intended for, granted, but as a prospective owner I would be a lot happier knowing she could handle the rough stuff well, even when pressed."

== See also ==
- List of sailing boat types
