= Jeanneau Yachts 64 =

Sailboat class

Development
- Designer: Philippe Briand; Andrew Winch; Jeanneau Design Office
- Location: France
- Year: 2015
- No. built: more than 70
- Builder: Jeanneau
- Role: Cruiser
- Name: Jeanneau Yachts 64

Boat
- Displacement: 68,343 lb (31,000 kg)
- Draft: 9.68 ft (2.95 m)

Hull
- Type: monohull
- Construction: fiberglass
- LOA: 65.94 ft (20.10 m)
- LWL: 59.05 ft (18.00 m)
- Beam: 17.72 ft (5.40 m)
- Engine: Volvo 180 hp (134 kW) diesel engine

Hull appendages
- Keel: fin keel with weighted bulb
- Ballast: 20,613 lb (9,350 kg)
- Rudder: spade-type rudder

Rig
- Rig type: Bermuda rig
- I foretriangle height: 82 ft (25 m)
- J foretriangle base: 24 ft 10 in (7.57 m)
- P mainsail luff: 78 ft 8 in (23.98 m)
- E mainsail foot: 24 ft 11 in (7.59 m)

Sails
- Sailplan: 9/10 fractional rigged sloop
- Mainsail area: 1,152 sq ft (107.0 m^{2})
- Jib/genoa area: 861 sq ft (80.0 m^{2})
- Spinnaker area: 3,229 sq ft (300.0 m^{2})
- Gennaker area: 3,229 sq ft (300.0 m^{2})
- Other sails: genoa: 1,098 sq ft (102.0 m^{2})
- Upwind sail area: 2,250 sq ft (209 m^{2})
- Downwind sail area: 4,381 sq ft (407.0 m^{2})

The Jeanneau Yachts 64, also called the Jeanneau 64, is a French sailboat that was designed as a blue water cruiser. The hull was designed by Philippe Briand, the interior by Andrew Winch, with finishing by the Jeanneau Design Office. It was first built in 2015.

The design was replaced in production in 2022 by the Jeanneau Yachts 65.

== Production ==
The design was built by Jeanneau in France, from 2015 to 2021 with over 70 boats built, but it is now out of production.

== Design ==
The Jeanneau Yachts 64 is a recreational keelboat, built predominantly of polyester fiberglass, with wood trim. The primary construction uses a vacuum infused vinylester-balsa sandwich. It has a 9/10 fractional sloop rig, with a keel-stepped mast, three sets of swept spreaders and aluminum spars with discontinuous Dyform rigging. The hull has a plumb stem, a reverse transom with a fold-down tailgate-style swimming platform, an internally mounted spade-type rudder controlled by dual wheels and a fixed L-shaped fin keel with a weighted bulb, or optional shoal-draft keel. Features include a stern dinghy garage and the mainsheet mounted on a fiberglass arch. The fin keel model displaces 68,343 lb (31,000 kg) empty and carries 20,613 lb (9,350 kg) of cast iron ballast, while the shoal-draft version displaces 70,989 lb (32,200 kg) empty and carries 23,259 lb (10,550 kg) of cast iron ballast.

The boat has a draft of 9.68 ft (2.95 m) with the standard keel and 7.22 ft (2.20 m) with the optional shoal draft keel.

The boat is fitted with a Swedish Volvo diesel engine of 180 hp (134 kW) for docking and maneuvering. The fuel tank holds 323 U.S. gallons (1,220 L; 269 imp gal), the fresh water tank has a capacity of 264 U.S. gallons (1,000 L; 220 imp gal) and the holding tank has a capacity of 69.7 U.S. gallons (264 L; 58.0 imp gal).

The design has sleeping accommodation for six people, with a double island berth in the bow cabin, a U-shaped settee and a straight settee in the main cabin and two aft cabins, one with a double berth on the starboard side and one with two singles to port. The galley is located on the port side just forward of the companionway ladder. The galley is L-shaped and is equipped with a stove, a 95.1 U.S. gallons (360 L; 79.2 imp gal) refrigerator/freezer and a double sink. A navigation station is opposite the galley, on the starboard side. There are three heads, one just forward of the bow cabin and two aft.

For sailing downwind the design may be equipped with a symmetrical spinnaker or an asymmetrical spinnaker of 3,229 sq ft (300.0 m^{2}).

The design has a hull speed of 10.3 kn (19.1 km/h).

== Operational history ==
The boat is supported by a class club, the Jeanneau Owners Network.

In a 2015 review for Yachting World, Belinda Bird wrote, "here is a yacht guaranteed to surprise. Packed within this 64ft 1in hull, the latest from Jeanneau, are a multitude of qualities that will make you question your preconceptions about the brand. The French production builder has married the world of big-boat luxury and comfort with production boat functionality and pricing to create a new market."

== See also ==
- List of sailing boat types
