= Jeanneau Yachts 51 =

Sailboat class

Development
- Designer: Philippe Briand; Andrew Winch; Jeanneau Design Office
- Location: France
- Year: 2015
- Builder: Jeanneau
- Role: Cruiser
- Name: Jeanneau Yachts 51

Boat
- Displacement: 31,746 lb (14,400 kg)
- Draft: 7.48 ft (2.28 m)

Hull
- Type: monohull
- Construction: fiberglass
- LOA: 50.46 ft (15.38 m)
- LWL: 45.77 ft (13.95 m)
- Beam: 15.42 ft (4.70 m)
- Engine: Yanmar 83 hp (62 kW) diesel engine

Hull appendages
- Keel: fin keel with weighted bulb
- Ballast: 9,480 lb (4,300 kg)
- Rudder: spade-type rudder

Rig
- Rig type: Bermuda rig
- I foretriangle height: 62.99 ft (19.20 m)
- J foretriangle base: 19.46 ft (5.93 m)
- P mainsail luff: 58.73 ft (17.90 m)
- E mainsail foot: 19.68 ft (6.00 m)

Sails
- Sailplan: fractional rigged sloop
- Mainsail area: 677 sq ft (62.9 m^{2})
- Jib/genoa area: 602 sq ft (55.9 m^{2})
- Other sails: Code 0: 1,076 sq ft (100.0 m^{2})
- Upwind sail area: 1,279 sq ft (118.8 m^{2})
- Downwind sail area: 1,753 sq ft (162.9 m^{2})

The Jeanneau Yachts 51, also called the Jeanneau 51, is a French sailboat. The hull was designed by Philippe Briand, the interior by Andrew Winch and finishing by the Jeanneau Design Office. It was designed as a blue water cruiser and first built in 2015.

== Production ==
The design was built by Jeanneau in France, starting in 2015, but it is now out of production.

== Design ==
The Jeanneau Yachts 51 is a recreational keelboat, built predominantly of polyester fiberglass, with wood trim. The hull is of solid fiberglass, while the deck is a fiberglass sandwich design. It has a fractional sloop rig, with a deck-stepped mast, two sets of swept spreaders and aluminum spars with discontinuous stainless steel wire rigging. In-mast mainsail furling is an option. The hull has a plumb stem, a reverse transom with a tailgate style fold-down swimming platform, an internally mounted spade-type rudder controlled by dual wheels and an L-shaped fixed fin keel with a weighted bulb or optional shoal-draft keel. The fin keel model displaces 31,747 lb (14,400 kg) empty and carries 9,480 lb (4,300 kg) of cast iron ballast, while the shoal-draft version displaces 32,739 lb (14,850 kg) and carries 10,472 lb (4,750 kg) of cast iron ballast.

The boat has a draft of 7.48 ft (2.28 m) with the standard keel and 5.67 ft (1.73 m) with the optional shoal-draft keel.

The boat is fitted with a Japanese Yanmar diesel engine of 80 hp (60 kW) with a saildrive, or 110 hp (82 kW) with a straight driveshaft for docking and maneuvering. The fuel tank holds 63 or 127 U.S. gallons (240 or 480 L; 52 or 106 imp gal) optional and the fresh water tank has a capacity of 169 U.S. gallons (640 L; 141 imp gal). There is a 45 U.S. gallons (170 L; 37 imp gal) holding tank.

Factory options included electric winches, air conditioning, a bowsprit

The design was built with a number of interior arrangements, providing sleeping accommodation for four to six people. A typical interior layout includes a double island berth in the bow cabin, a U-shaped settee and a straight settee in the main cabin and an aft cabin with a double berth on the port side. The aft cabin may be subdivided to provide an additional single or double berth. The galley is located on the starboard side just forward of the companionway ladder. The galley is J-shaped and is equipped with a stove, an ice box and a double sink. A navigation station is opposite the galley, on the port side. With two cabins there are two heads, one in the bow cabin on the starboard side and one on the port side in the aft cabin. When an additional cabin is fitted, a third head may be provided aft on the starboard side. Cabin maximum headroom is 7 ft (213 cm).

For sailing downwind the design may be equipped with a code 0 sail of 1,076 sq ft (100.0 m^{2}).

The design has a hull speed of 9.07 kn (16.80 km/h).

== Operational history ==
In a 2017 review Zuzana Prochazka wrote, "the most notable characteristic of the J51 under sail is her balance. In 17 knots of breeze at 40 degrees apparent wind angle, our test boat blazed along at 8.1 knots with only light fingertip control on the helm. She basically sailed herself and pointed impressively high. As we eased off and the wind dropped to 11 knots, the Technique Voile sails drew us along at 7.6 knots on a beam reach."

== See also ==
- List of sailing boat types
