= Al Mirqab =

Al Mirqab may refer to:

- Al Mirqab (Doha), a district in Qatar
- Al Mirqab (yacht), a yacht
- Mirgab, an area in Kuwait City, Kuwait
