= Swan 44 Frers =

Sailboat class

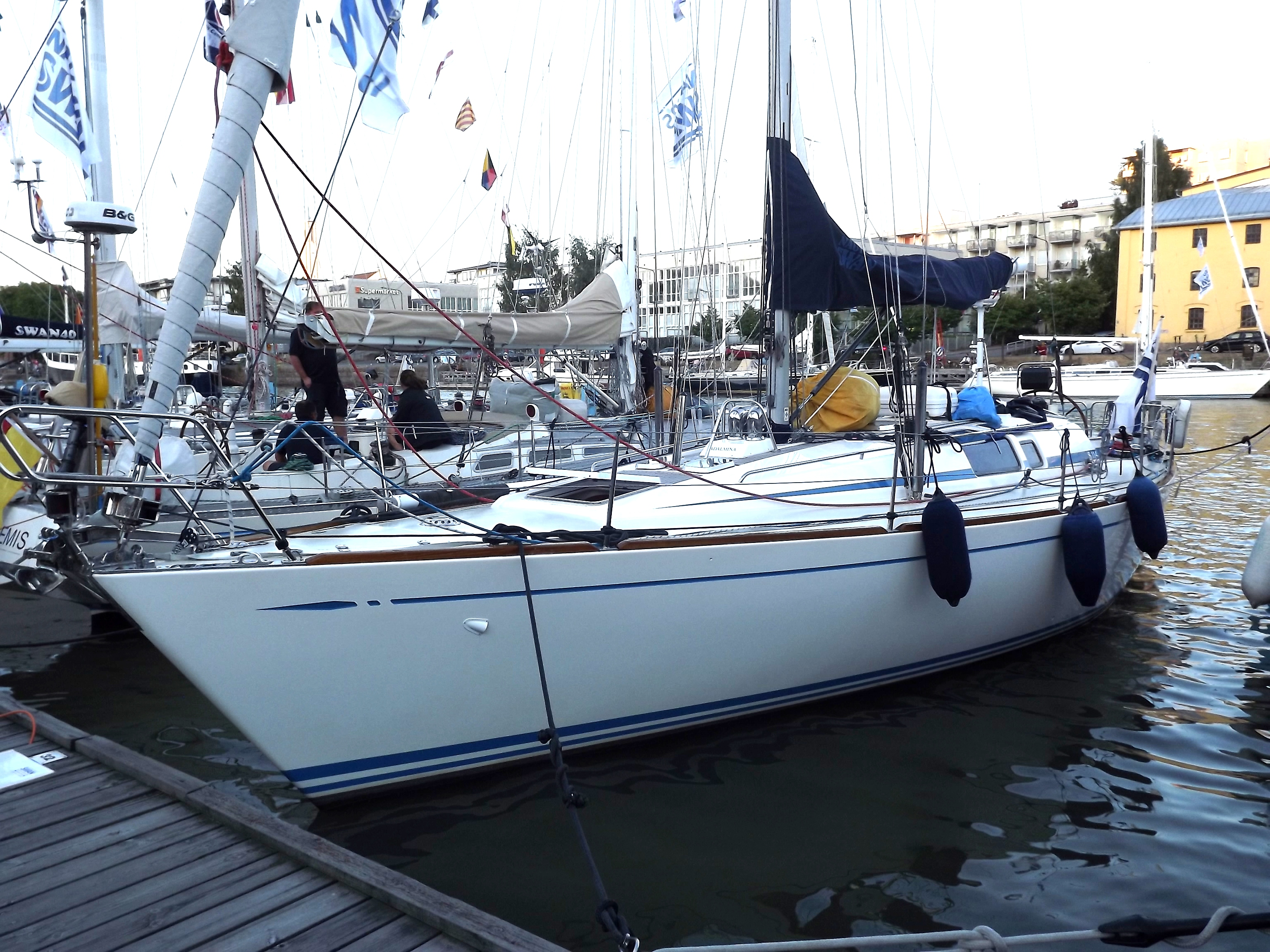

Development
- Designer: Germán Frers; Andrew Winch
- Location: Finland
- Year: 1988
- No. built: 69
- Builder: Oy Nautor AB
- Role: Cruiser

Boat
- Displacement: 24,500 lb (11,113 kg)
- Draft: 8.25 ft (2.51 m)

Hull
- Type: monohull
- Construction: glassfibre
- LOA: 44.00 ft (13.41 m)
- LWL: 34.58 ft (10.54 m)
- Beam: 13.67 ft (4.17 m)
- Engine: Perkins Engines 50 hp (37 kW) diesel engine

Hull appendages
- Keel: Fin keel with weighted bulb
- Ballast: 7,700 lb (3,493 kg)
- Rudder: Spade-type rudder

Rig
- Rig type: Bermuda rig
- I foretriangle height: 57.35 ft (17.48 m)
- J foretriangle base: 16.73 ft (5.10 m)
- P mainsail luff: 50.75 ft (15.47 m)
- E mainsail foot: 16.17 ft (4.93 m)

Sails
- Sailplan: Masthead sloop
- Mainsail area: 410.31 sq ft (38.119 m^{2})
- Jib/genoa area: 479.73 sq ft (44.568 m^{2})
- Total sail area: 890.04 sq ft (82.687 m^{2})

The Swan 44 Frers is a Finnish sailboat that was designed by Germán Frers as a blue water cruiser and first built in 1988. The boat was restyled during it production run with hence the Mk1 and Mk2 versions of this model.

The design was originally marketed by the manufacturer as the Swan 44, but is now usually referred to as the Swan 44 Frers to differentiate it from the unrelated 1972 Sparkman & Stephens Swan 44 design.

== Production ==
The design was built by Oy Nautor AB in Finland, from 1988 to 2002 and is now out of production.

== Design ==
The Swan 44 Frers is a recreational keelboat, built predominantly of glassfibre, with wood trim. It has a masthead sloop rig, three sets of spreaders, steel rod rigging, a raked stem plumb stem, a reverse transom, an internally mounted spade-type rudder controlled by a wheel and a fixed fin keel with a weighted bulb or optional shoal-draft keel.

The design was produced with a number of layouts. The standard layout was a double "V"-berth in the bow cabin, an L-shaped settee and a straight settee in the main cabin, with a pilot berth to port and an aft cabin with a double berth on the port side. The galley is located on the port side just forward of the companionway ladder. The galley is L-shaped and is equipped with a three-burner stove, an ice box and a double sink. A navigation station is opposite the galley, on the starboard side. There are two heads, one in the bow cabin on the port side and one on the starboard side aft.

== Variants ==
Mark I
This model was produced from 1988 to 1994, with 19 built (hull numbers 101-119) with exterior styling by Andrew Winch. It has a length overall of 44.00 ft (13.4 m), a waterline length of 34.58 ft (10.5 m), displaces 24,500 lb (11,113 kg) and carries 7,700 lb (3,493 kg) of lead ballast. The boat has a draft of 8.25 ft (2.51 m) with the standard keel and 6.89 ft (2.10 m) with the optional shoal draft keel. The boat is fitted with a British Perkins Engines diesel engine of 50 hp (37 kW). The fuel tank holds 70 U.S. gallons (260 L; 58 imp gal) and the fresh water tank has a capacity of 90 U.S. gallons (340 L; 75 imp gal). The design has a hull speed of 7.88 kn (14.59 km/h).
Mark II
This Mk.1 hull mould were used between 1996 to 2002 to also produce 50 built (hull numbers 120-169) Mk.2 hulls. The primary difference is more conventional styling of the coachroof (no wrap around windows) and some updates to improve performance. It has a length overall of 44.11 ft (13.4 m), a waterline length of 34.65 ft (10.6 m), displaces 24,300 lb (11,022 kg) and carries 8,400 lb (3,810 kg) of lead ballast. The boat has a draft of 7.15 ft (2.18 m) with the standard lead keel. The boat is fitted with a Swedish Volvo Penta MD22L diesel engine. The fuel tank holds 105 U.S. gallons (400 L; 87 imp gal) and the fresh water tank has a capacity of 100 U.S. gallons (380 L; 83 imp gal). The design has a hull speed of 7.89 kn (14.61 km/h) and a PHRF racing average handicap of 81.

== Operational history ==
In a 2001 design review for boats.com, Robert Perry wrote, "if life were fair, we would all sail Swans and drive Mercedes. I'm not too particular about which Swan; they are all kind of nice. The Frers-designed 44 would do. It is a big sister to the 36, with the new window treatment and emphasis on cruising comfort."

== See also ==
- List of sailing boat types
