= Swan 44 =

Sailboat class

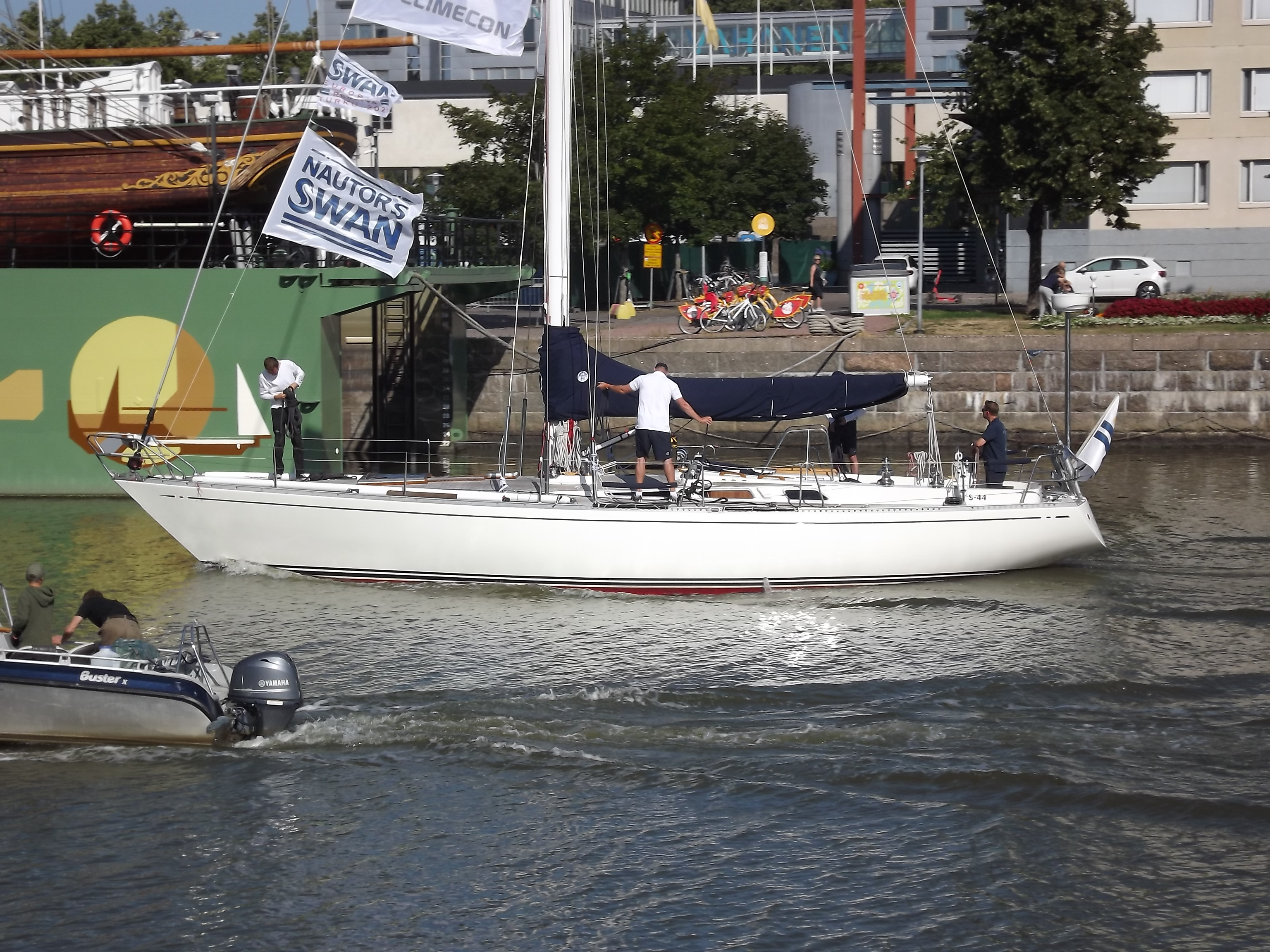

Development
- Designer: Sparkman & Stephens
- Location: Finland
- Year: 1972
- No. built: 76
- Builder: Oy Nautor AB
- Role: Racer-Cruiser
- Name: Swan 44

Boat
- Displacement: 28,000 lb (12,701 kg)
- Draft: 7.40 ft (2.26 m)

Hull
- Type: monohull
- Construction: glassfibre
- LOA: 44.00 ft (13.41 m)
- LWL: 33.89 ft (10.33 m)
- Beam: 12.58 ft (3.83 m)
- Engine: Perkins Engines 4-108M 37 hp (28 kW) diesel engine

Hull appendages
- Keel: swept fin keel
- Ballast: 12,600 lb (5,715 kg)
- Rudder: Skeg-mounted rudder

Rig
- Rig type: Bermuda rig
- I foretriangle height: 57.50 ft (17.53 m)
- J foretriangle base: 18.60 ft (5.67 m)
- P mainsail luff: 51.00 ft (15.54 m)
- E mainsail foot: 15.50 ft (4.72 m)

Sails
- Sailplan: Masthead sloop
- Mainsail area: 395.25 sq ft (36.720 m^{2})
- Jib/genoa area: 534.75 sq ft (49.680 m^{2})
- Total sail area: 930.00 sq ft (86.400 m^{2})

Racing
- PHRF: 81-87

The Swan 44 is a Finnish sailboat that was designed by Sparkman & Stephens as an International Offshore Rule racer-cruiser and first built in 1972. The boat is Sparkman & Stephens' design #2112.

The design is often referred to as the Swan 44 S&S to avoid confusion with the 1989 Swan 44 Frers, designed by Germán Frers. The boat was also sold in the United States as the Palmer Johnson 44.

== Production ==
The design was built by Oy Nautor AB in Finland, from 1972 to 1978, with 76 boats completed, but it is now out of production. A total of 62 boats were built with the tall mast and 14 with the short mast.

== Design ==
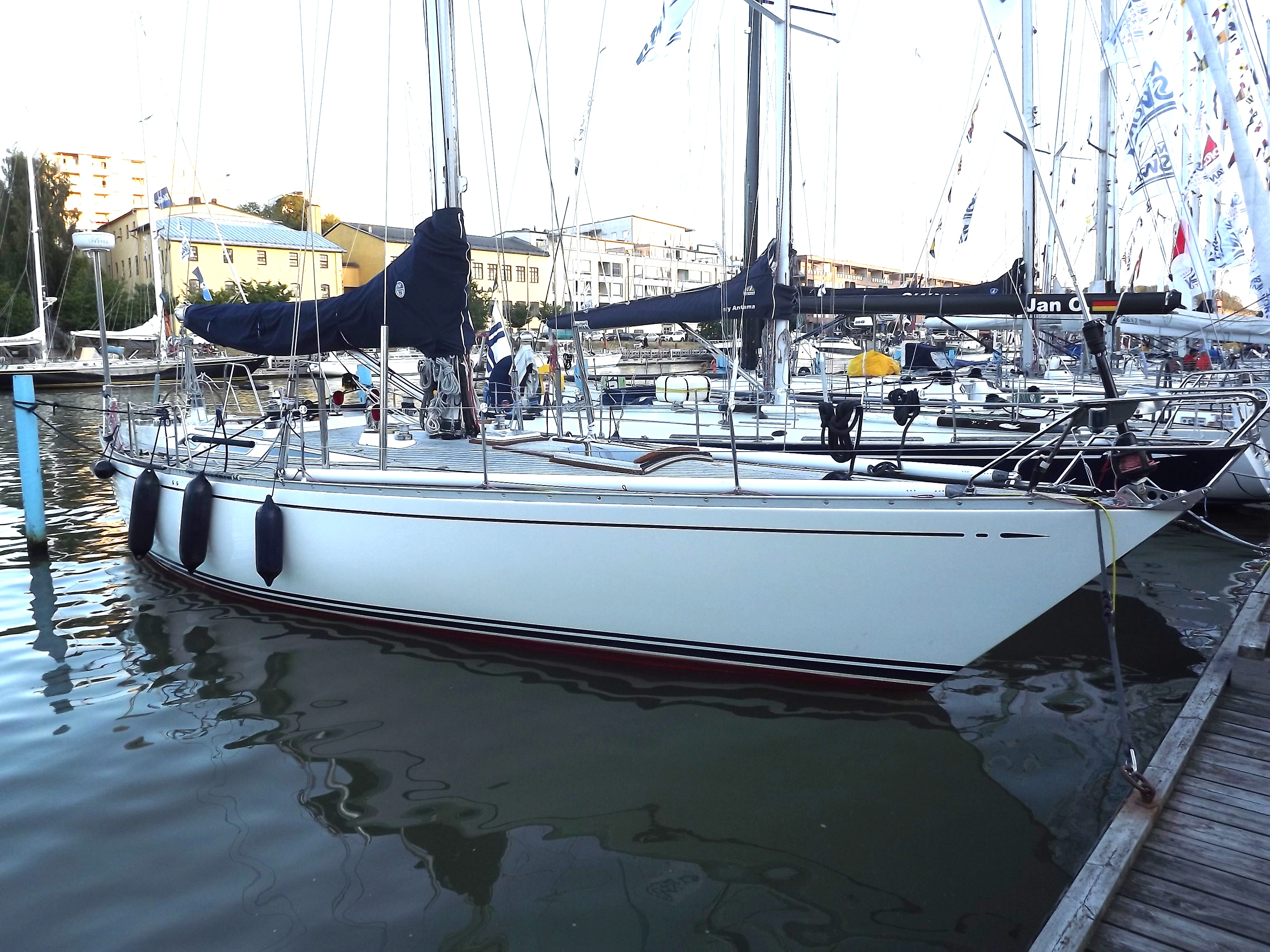
Swan 44

The Swan 44 is a racing keelboat, built predominantly of glassfibre, with wood trim. It has a masthead sloop rig; a raked stem; a raised counter, reverse transom, a skeg-mounted rudder controlled by a wheel and a fixed, swept fin keel. It displaces 28,000 lb (12,701 kg) and carries 12,600 lb (5,715 kg) of lead ballast. A short mast version was also built with a mast about 2.50 ft (0.76 m) lower.

The boat has a draft of 7.40 ft (2.26 m) with the standard fin keel.

The boat is fitted with a British Perkins Engines 4-108M diesel engine of 37 hp (28 kW) for docking and manoeuvring.

The design has sleeping accommodation for eight people, with a double "V"-berth in the bow cabin, two straight settee berths and two pilot berths in the main cabin and two aft cabins, each with a single berth. The galley is located on the port side just forward of the companionway ladder. The galley is L-shaped and is equipped with a two-burner stove, an ice box and a double sink. A navigation station is opposite the galley, on the starboard side. The head is located just aft of the companionway steps on the starboard side.

For sailing downwind the design may be equipped with a symmetrical spinnaker.

The design has a hull speed of 7.80 kn (14.45 km/h) and a PHRF handicap of 81 to 87 for the tall mast and 90 to 96 for the short mast.

== Operational history ==
At least one boat had its stern modified and a deeper draft spade rudder installed to improve downwind handling and reduce the risk of broaching.

== See also ==
- List of sailing boat types
