= Luminance (yacht) =

Yacht, manufactured by Lürssen

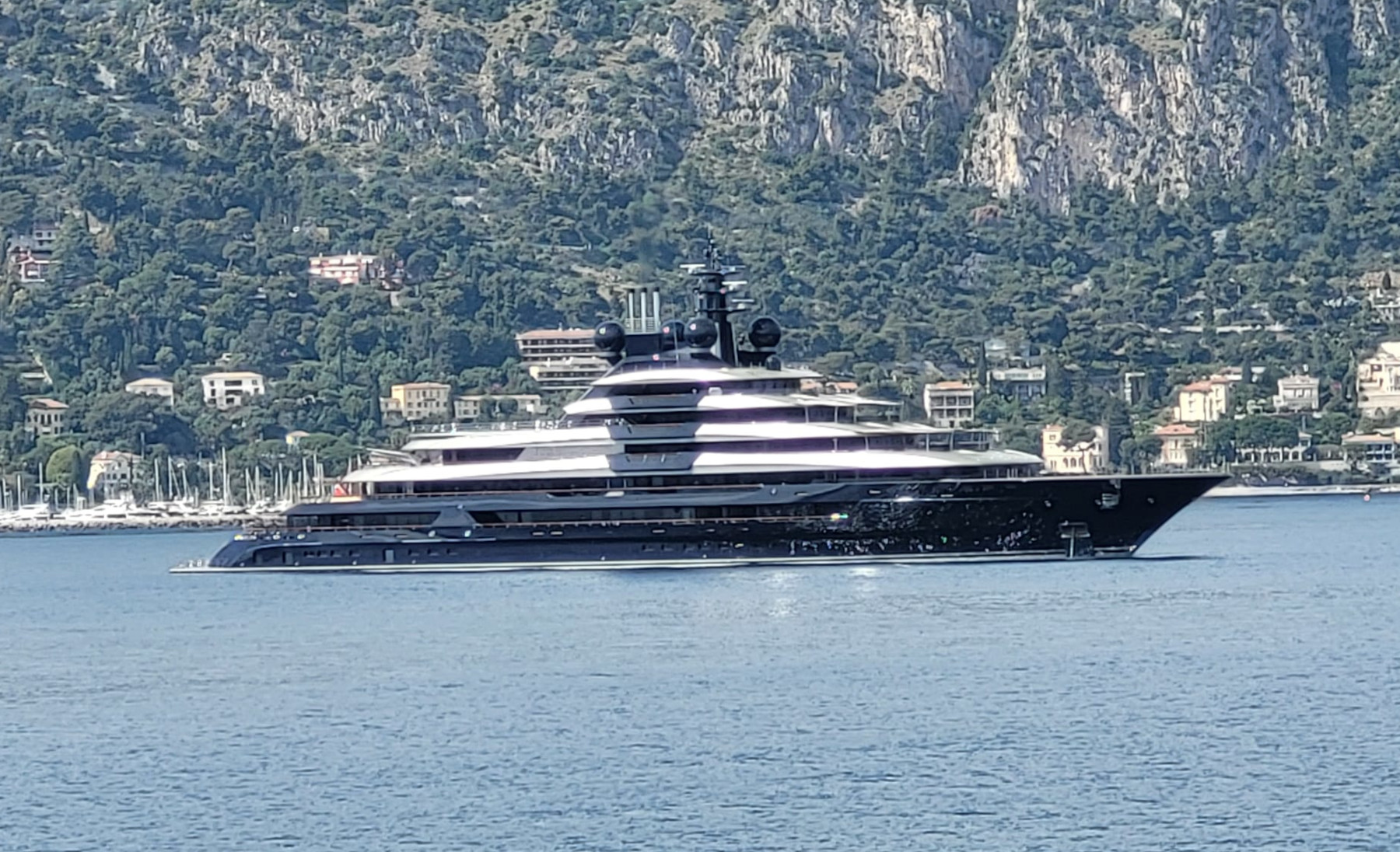

History

Cayman Islands
- Name: Luminance
- Owner: Rinat Akhmetov
- Builder: Lürssen
- Launched: 2023
- Completed: 2024
- In service: 2024
- Identification: IMO number: 9865087; MMSI number: 319271500; Callsign: ZGPS8

General characteristics
- Class & type: Motor yacht
- Tonnage: 9,861 GT
- Length: 138.8 m (455 ft 5 in)
- Beam: 21 m (68 ft 11 in)
- Draught: 5.3 m (17 ft 5 in)
- Propulsion: 2 × 9,789 hp (7,300 kW) MTU (16V28/33D) 16-cylinder engines
- Speed: 20 knots (37 km/h) (maximum)
- Capacity: 24 passengers
- Crew: 40

The superyacht Luminance was built by Lürssen of Germany and delivered to its owner, Rinat Akhmetov, a Ukrainian billionaire, in 2024.

== Design ==
The yacht's exterior design is from Espen Øino (Oeino), while Zuretti Design was responsible for the interior design. The length is 138.8 m (455 ft 5 in), the beam is 21 m (68 ft 11 in) and the draught is 5.3 m (17 ft 5 in). The hull is constructed of steel, and the superstructure is made of aluminium. The colour scheme is blue and silver. The yacht is flagged in the Cayman Islands. The cost of the ship has been estimated to be about $500 million, and the annual running cost is about $50 million.

=== Amenities ===
Luminance has many amenities: Gym, elevator, foredeck pool, aft infinity pool, tender garage, swimming platform, air conditioning, BBQ, beach club, deck jacuzzi, spa room, and jacuzzi. There are also two helicopter landing pads.

=== Performance ===
Propulsion is supplied by twin diesel MAN (16V28/33D) 16-cylinder 9,789 hp (7,300 kW) engines. Top speed is 20 knots (37 km/h)and her cruising speed of 15 knots (28 km/h). The ship has underway stabilizers, an at-anchor stabilizer, and a bow thruster system.

== History ==
Luminance is one of the largest superyachts based on its length.

== See also ==
- List of motor yachts by length
- List of yachts built by Lürssen
