= Lakshmi Mittal =

Indian businessman (born 1950)

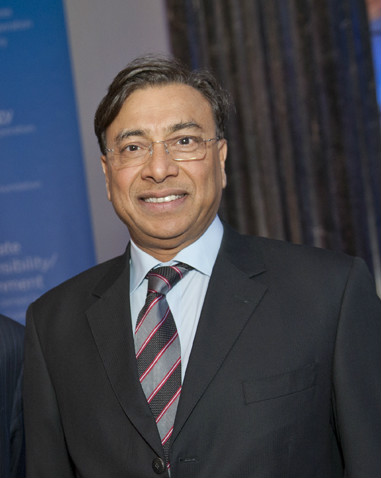
- Mittal in 2013
- Born: 15 June 1950 (age 76); Sadulpur, Rajasthan, India
- Education: St. Xavier's College, Kolkata, (B.Com.)
- Occupations: Chairman of ArcelorMittal & Aperam; Owner of Karrick Limited; Co-owner of Queens Park Rangers F.C.
- Known for: Steel magnate King of Steel
- Board member of: Goldman Sachs
- Spouse: Usha Mittal
- Children: 2, including Aditya Mittal
- Relatives: Pramod Mittal (brother)
- Family: Mittal family
- Awards: Padma Vibhushan (2008)

Lakshmi Niwas Mittal (Hindi: [ˈləkʃmi nɪˈʋaːsə ˈmɪtːələ]; born 15 June 1950) is an Indian billionaire businessman and steel magnate. He is the executive chairman of ArcelorMittal, the world's second largest steelmaking company, as well as chairman of stainless steel manufacturer Aperam. Mittal owns 38 per cent of ArcelorMittal. He also holds a 75 percent stake in the Indian Premier League (IPL) team Rajasthan Royals. Mittal resides in Switzerland and United Arab Emirates following his departure from the United Kingdom in 2025, where he had lived since 1995.

In 2005, Forbes ranked Mittal as the third-richest person in the world, making him the first Indian citizen to be ranked in the top ten in the publication's annual list of the world's richest people. He was ranked the sixth-richest person in the world by Forbes in 2011, but dropped to 82nd place in March 2015, and only to 130th by October 2024. He is also the "57th-most powerful person" of the 72 individuals named in Forbes' "Most Powerful People" list for 2015. His daughter Vanisha Mittal's wedding (in 2005) was the sixth-most expensive in recorded history. As of 2025, Mittal's net worth was estimated to be £15.444 billion by the Sunday Times Rich List.

Mittal has been a member of the board of directors of Goldman Sachs since 2008. He sits on the World Steel Association's executive committee, and is a member of the Global CEO Council of the Chinese People's Association for Friendship with Foreign Countries, the World Economic Forum's International Business Council, and the European Round Table of Industrialists. He is also a member of the board of trustees of the Cleveland Clinic.

In 2005, The Sunday Times named him "Business Person of 2006", the Financial Times named him "Person of the Year", and Time magazine named him "International Newsmaker of the Year 2006". In 2007, Time magazine included him in their "Time 100" list.

== Early life and education ==
Lakshmi Niwas Mittal was born on 15 June 1950, in Sadulpur, Rajasthan to a Marwari family. He studied at Shri Daulatram Nopany Vidyalaya, Calcutta from 1957 to 1964. He graduated from St. Xavier's College, affiliated to the University of Calcutta, with a B.Com degree in the first class. Lakshmi Niwas' father, Mohanlal Mittal, ran a steel business, Nippon Denro Ispat.

== Career ==
In 1976, because of the curb of steel production by the Indian government, the 26-year-old Mittal opened his first steel factory PT Ispat Indo in Sidoarjo, East Java, Indonesia.

In 1989, Mittal purchased the state-owned steel works in Trinidad and Tobago, which were operating at an enormous loss. He turned them into profitable ventures in a year.

Until the 1990s, the family's main assets in India were a cold-rolling mill for sheet steel in Nagpur and an alloy steel plant near Pune. Today, the family business, including a large integrated steel plant near Mumbai, is run by his younger brothers Pramod Mittal and Vinod Mittal, but Lakshmi has no connection with it.

In 1995, Mittal purchased the Irish Steel plant based in Cork, Ireland, from the government for a nominal fee of IR£1. Only six years later in 2001 it was closed, leaving over 400 people redundant. Subsequent environmental issues at the site have been a cause for criticism. The Irish government sought a High Court judgement that Mittal's company should contribute to the cost of the clean-up of Cork Harbour, but failed. The clean up was expected to cost €70 million.

Before December 2001, Mittal had acquired assets which he renamed Ispat Mexicana and his Kazakhstani operation Ispat Karmet. That month, he renamed Sidex Galati to Ispat Sidex, which he had acquired in November 2001.

In October 2003, the LNM Group succeeded in concluding the $155 million transaction to pry loose the Romanian government from the control of steel assets Siderurgica Hunedoara and Petrotub Roman, the day after it took over the PHS Steel Group, which included Huta Sendzimira, Huta Katowice, Huta Florian, and Huta Cedler from the Polish government.

Petrotub Roman was renamed Ispat Tepro in the sequel.

Mittal successfully employed Marek Dochnal's consultancy to influence Polish officials in the 2003 privatisation of PHS steel group, which was then Poland's largest. Dochnal was later arrested for bribing Polish officials on behalf of Russian agents in a separate affair.

Employees of Mittal have accused him of allowing "slave labour" conditions after multiple fatalities in his mines. For example, during December 2004, 23 miners died in explosions in his mines in Kazakhstan caused by faulty gas detectors.

In 2006–07, Mittal succeeded in a hostile takeover bid for Arcelor, which he renamed Arcelor Mittal. In so doing, he obtained control of, amongst others, the Usinor steel assets of France, the Arbed steel assets of Luxembourg, and the Aceralia steel assets of Spain.

== Controversies ==
=== Tony Blair lobbying scandal ===
In 2002, Plaid Cymru MP Adam Price obtained a letter written by Tony Blair to the Romanian Government in support of Mittal's LNM Group steel company, which was in the process of bidding to buy Romania's state-owned industry. This revelation caused controversy, because Mittal had given £125,000 to the British Labour Party the previous year. Although Blair defended his letter as simply "celebrating the success" of a British company, he was criticised because LNM was registered in the Dutch Antilles and employed less than 1% of its workforce in the UK. LNM was a "major global competitor of Britain's own struggling steel industry".

Blair's letter hinted that the privatisation of the firm and sale to Mittal might help smooth the way for Romania's entry into the European Union. It also had a passage, removed just before Blair's signing of it, describing Mittal as "a friend".

In October 2003, the LNM Group succeeded in concluding the transaction to pry loose the Romanian government from the control of steel assets.

== Social work ==
=== Sports ===
After witnessing India win only one medal, bronze, in the 2000 Summer Olympics, and one medal, silver, at the 2004 Summer Olympics, Mittal decided to set up the Mittal Champions Trust with $9 million to support ten Indian athletes with world-beating potential. In 2008, Mittal awarded Abhinav Bindra with Rs. 1.5 Crore (Rs. 15 million), for getting India its first individual Olympic gold medal in shooting. ArcelorMittal also provided steel for the construction of the ArcelorMittal Orbit for the 2012 Summer Olympics.

For Comic Relief he matched the money raised (~£1 million) on the celebrity special BBC programme, The Apprentice.

Mittal had emerged as a leading contender to buy and sell Barclays Premiership clubs Wigan and Everton. However, on 20 December 2007, it was announced that the Mittal family had purchased a 20 per cent shareholding in Queens Park Rangers football club joining Flavio Briatore and Mittal's friend Bernie Ecclestone. As part of the investment Mittal's son-in-law, Amit Bhatia, took a place on the board of directors. The combined investment in the struggling club sparked suggestions that Mittal might be looking to join the growing ranks of wealthy individuals investing heavily in English football and emulating similar benefactors such as Roman Abramovich. On 19 February 2010, Briatore resigned as QPR chairman, and sold further shares in the club to Ecclestone, making Ecclestone the single largest shareholder.

In May 2026, a consortium led by Lakshmi Mittal and Adar Poonawalla acquired Indian Premier League franchise Rajasthan Royals for $1.65 billion with Lakshmi having majority stake at 75% and Adar 18% and remaining being with Manoj Badale.

=== Education ===
In 2003, the Lakshmi Niwas Mittal, Usha Mittal Foundation and the Government of Rajasthan partnered together to establish a university, the LNM Institute of Information Technology (LNMIIT) in Jaipur as an autonomous non-profit organisation.

In 2009, the Foundation along with Bharatiya Vidya Bhavan founded the Usha Lakshmi Mittal Institute of Management in New Delhi.

SNDT Women's University renamed the Institute of Technology for Women (ITW) as Usha Mittal Institute of Technology after a large donation from the Lakshmi Niwas Mittal Foundation.

He completed his primary and secondary school from Nopany High, formerly known as Shri Daulatram Nopany Vidyalaya.

=== Medical ===
In 2008, the Mittals made a donation of £15 million to Great Ormond Street Hospital in London, the largest private contribution the hospital had ever received. The donation was used to help fund their new facility, the Mittal Children's Medical Centre.

==== COVID-19 pandemic ====
He made a donation of ₹100 crores to PM cares fund during the COVID-19 pandemic in India in 2020.

== Personal life ==
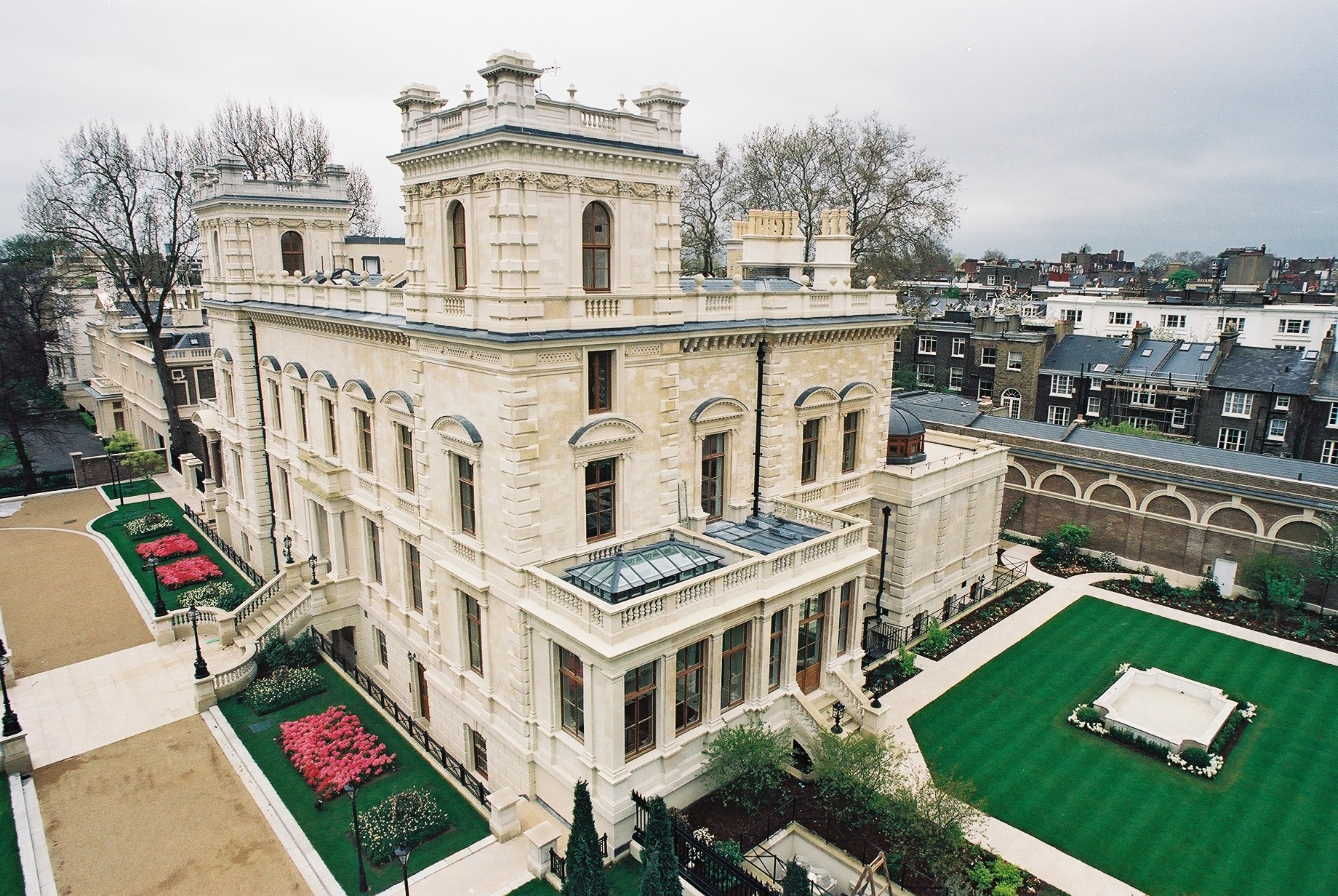
Mittal's residence, 18–19, Kensington Palace Gardens, London

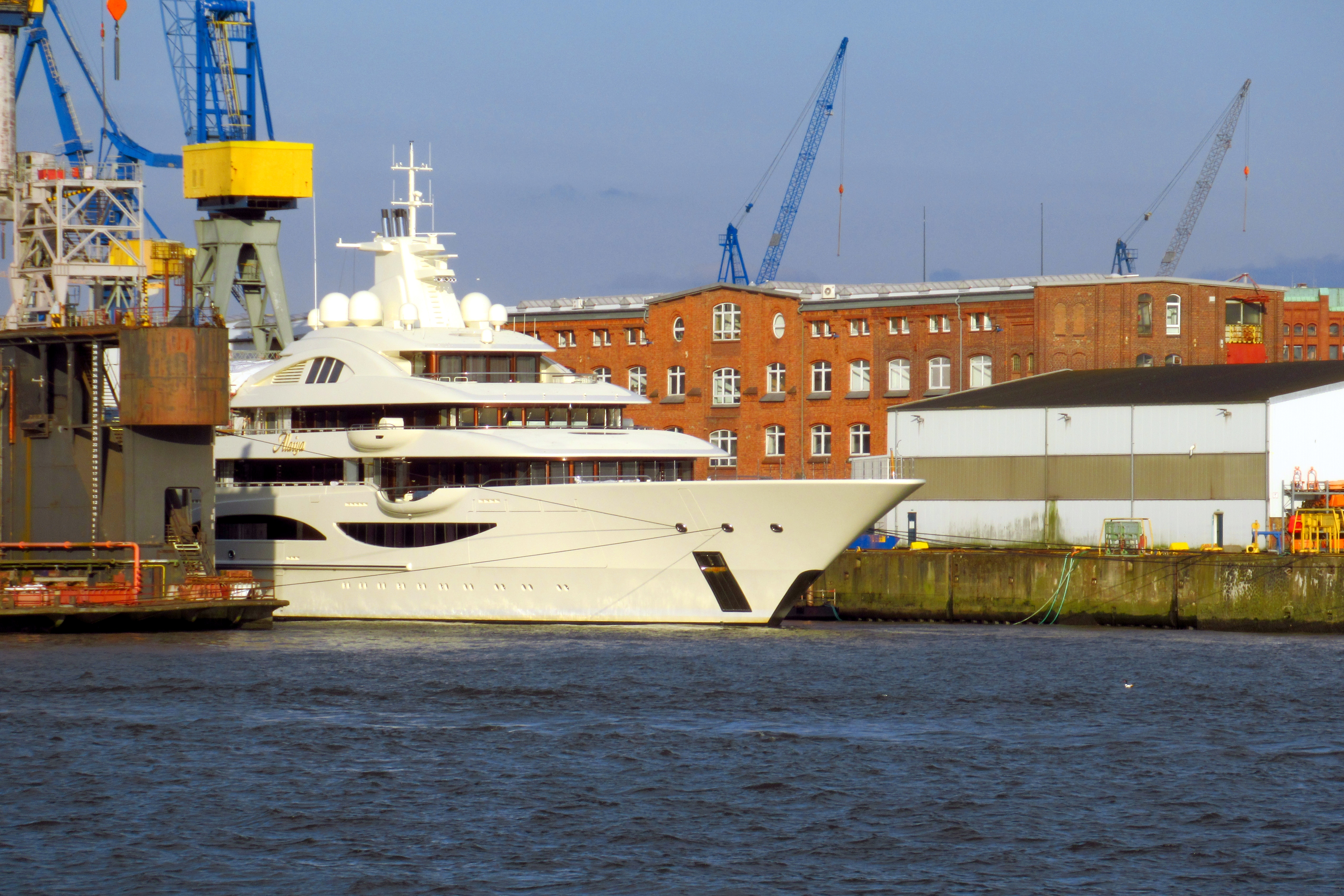
Alaiya is a 111 m luxury superyacht, owned by Mittal.

Mittal is married to Usha Dalmia. They have a son Aditya Mittal and a daughter, Vanisha Mittal.

Lakshmi Mittal has two brothers, Pramod Mittal and Vinod Mittal, and a sister, Seema Lohia, who married Indonesian businessman, Sri Prakash Lohia. His residence at 18–19 Kensington Palace Gardens—which was purchased from Formula One boss Bernie Ecclestone in 2004 for £67 million (US$128 million)—made it the world's most expensive house at the time. The house is decorated with marble taken from the same quarry that supplied the Taj Mahal. The extravagant show of wealth has been referred to as the "Taj Mittal". It has 12 bedrooms, an indoor pool, Turkish baths and parking for 20 cars. He is a lacto-vegetarian.

Mittal bought No. 9A Palace Greens, Kensington Gardens, formerly the Philippines Embassy, for £70 million in 2008 for his daughter Vanisha Mittal, who is married to Amit Bhatia, a businessman and philanthropist. Mittal threw a lavish "vegetarian reception" for Vanisha in the Palace of Versailles, France.

In 2005, he also bought a colonial bungalow for $30 million at No. 22, Dr APJ Abdul Kalam Road, New Delhi, one of the most exclusive streets in India, occupied by embassies and billionaires, and rebuilt it as a house.

In 2025, Mittal was reported to be preparing to leave the United Kingdom after nearly three decades of residence, following the UK government’s decision to abolish the non-domiciled ("non-dom") tax status.

In November 2025, The Sunday Times newspaper reported that Mittal had paid about $200 million (£152.7 million) for a baroque mansion at Emirates Hills' Dubai. The paper also confirmed that 'he is resident in Switzerland for tax and is to spend much of his future in Dubai.'

=== Personal wealth ===
According to the Sunday Times Rich List 2016, Mittal and his family had an estimated personal net worth of £7.12 billion, a decrease of $2.08 billion on the previous year. Meanwhile, in 2016 Forbes magazine's annual billionaires list assessed estimated Mittal's wealth in 2016 at as the 135th-wealthiest billionaire with a net worth of US$8.4 billion. Mittal's net worth peaked in 2008, assessed by The Sunday Times at £27.70 billion, and by Forbes at US$45.0 billion, and rated as the fourth-wealthiest individual in the world. As of 2022, he was ranked as the 15th richest man in India by Forbes with a net-worth of US$17.8 billion. According to Forbes, Lakshmi Mittal’s net worth is currently estimated at US$16.4 billion as of 2024. He holds the position of the 113th richest individual globally and ranks as the 13th wealthiest person in India.

In October 2024, Mittal was ranked 15th on Forbes' list of India’s 100 richest tycoons, with a net worth of $16.7 billion.

==== Wealth rankings ====
Legend
Icon	Description
Steady	Has not changed from the previous year's list
▲	Has increased from the previous year's list
▼	Has decreased from the previous year's list

Year	The Sunday Times Rich List		Forbes The World's Billionaires	
Year	Rank	Net worth (£) bn	Rank	Net worth (US$) bn
2005			3	$25.00
2006	1	£14.88 ▲	5 ▼	$23.50 ▼
2007	1	£19.25 ▲	5	$32.00 ▲
2008	1	£27.70 ▲	4 ▲	$45.00 ▲
2009	1	£10.80 ▼	8 ▼	$19.30 ▼
2010	1	£22.45 ▲	5 ▲	$28.70 ▲
2011	1	£17.50 ▼	6 ▼	$31.10 ▲
2012	1	£12.70 ▼	21 ▼	$20.70 ▼
2013	4 ▼	£10.00 ▼	41 ▼	$16.50 ▼
2014	3 ▲	£10.25 ▲	52 ▼	$13.70 ▼
2015	7 ▼	£9.20 ▲	82 ▼	$13.50 ▼
2016	11 ▼	£7.12 ▲	135 ▼	$8.40 ▼
2020	19 ▼	£6.78 ▼	196 ▼	$9.70 ▲
2024	7 ▲	£14.92 ▲	113▲	$16.4 ▲

== Awards and honours ==
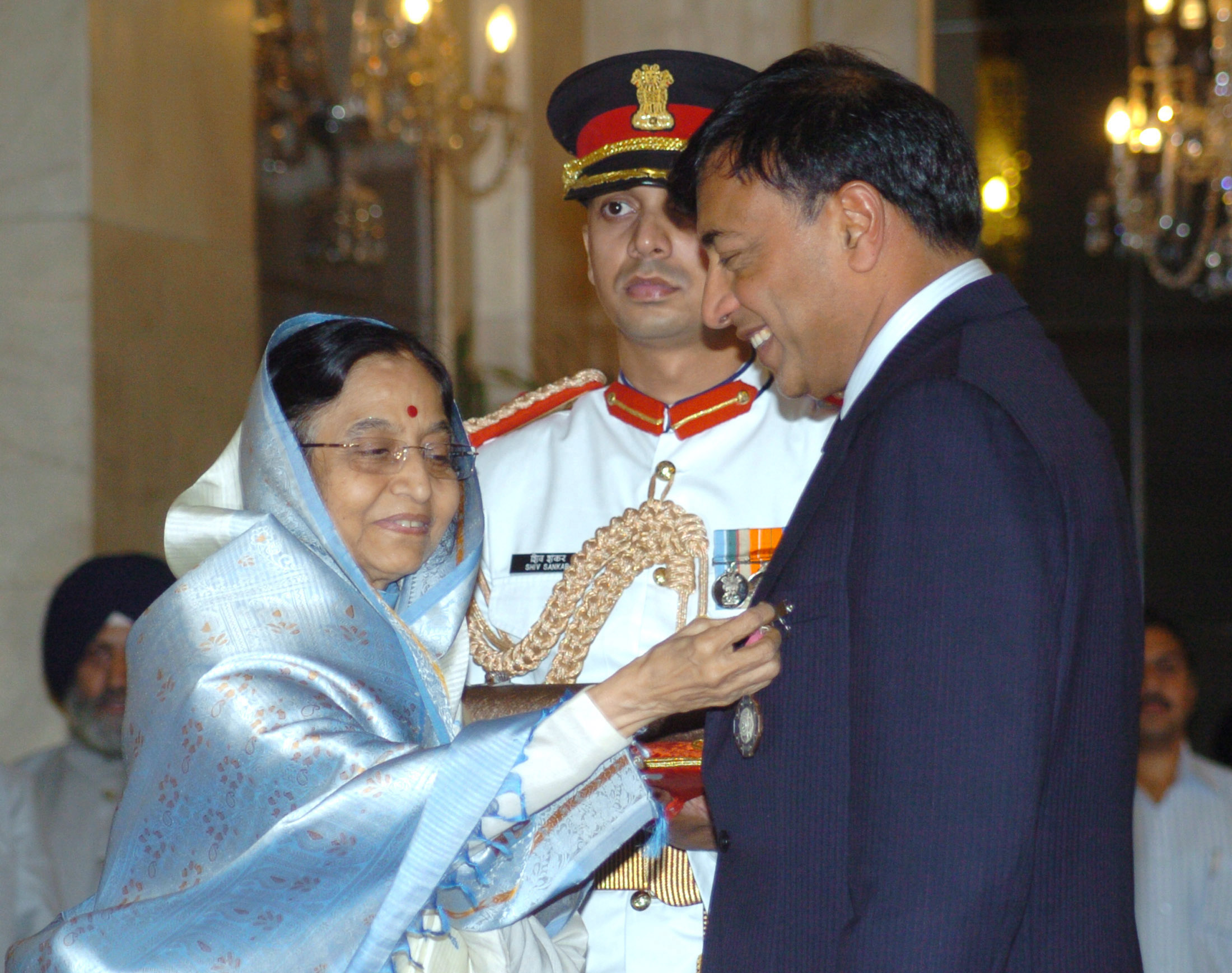
The President, Smt. Pratibha Devisingh Patil presenting the Padma Vibhushan to Shri Lakshmi Niwas Mittal at Civil Investiture-II Ceremony, at Rashtrapati Bhavan, in New Delhi on May 10, 2008

Year of award or honour	Name of award or honour	Awarding organisation
2008	Padma Vibhushan	Government of India
2008	Forbes Lifetime Achievement Award	Forbes
2007	Fellowship	King's College London
2007	Bessemer Gold Medal	IOM3
2004	European Businessman of the Year	Forbes
2004	Entrepreneur of the Year	The Wall Street Journal
2004	8th honorary Willy Korf Steel Vision Award	American Metal Market and World Steel Dynamics
1996	Steel Maker of the Year	New Steel

- Tim Bouquet and Byron Ousey – Cold Steel (Little, Brown, 2008)
- Navalpreet Rangi – Documentary Film (The Man with a Mission, 2010)
