= Opera (yacht) =

2023 superyacht by Lürssen

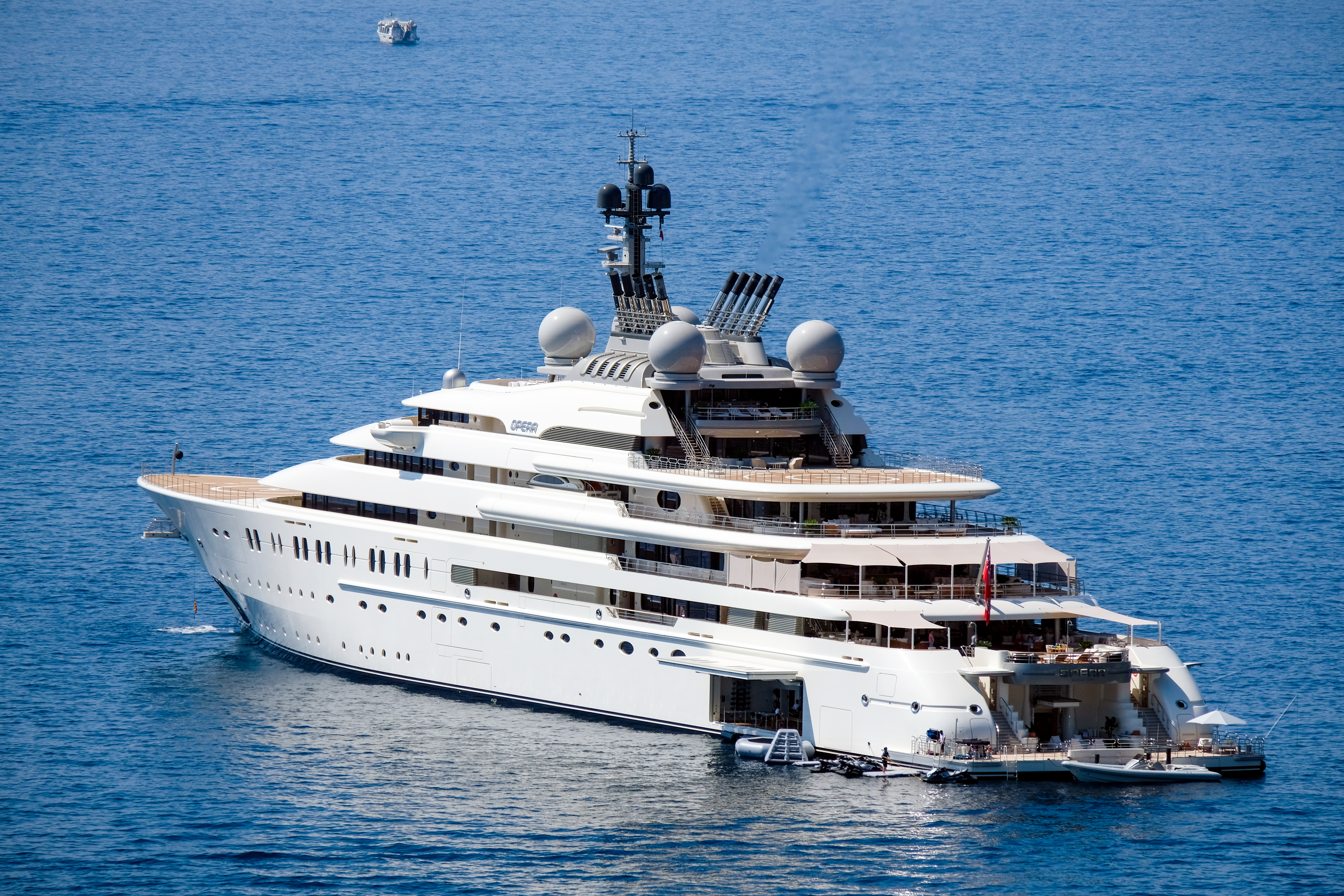
- Opera off the Amalfi coast, 2023

History

Cayman Islands
- Name: Opera
- Owner: Emirati royalty, possibly Abdullah bin Zayed Al Nahyan
- Builder: Lürssen
- Yard number: 13796
- Laid down: 2020
- Launched: 2022
- Completed: 2023
- Identification: IMO number: 1012933; MMSI number: 319256700; Callsign:ZGKQ9

General characteristics
- Class & type: Motor yacht
- Tonnage: 12,528 GT
- Length: 146.35 m (480 ft 2 in)
- Beam: 22.49 m (73 ft 9 in)
- Decks: 7
- Installed power: 2 × MTU diesel engines, 5,300 kW (7,100 hp) each; 10.600 kW (14.215 hp) total
- Propulsion: Twin screw propellers
- Capacity: 18 guest staterooms or 24
- Crew: 50 or 80
- Notes: Two helipads

Opera, a 146.35-metre (480 ft 2 in) superyacht built by the German shipyard Lürssen in Bremen, was commissioned in 2020 and delivered in February 2023. The reported owner is of Emirati royalty,, possibly Abdullah bin Zayed Al Nahyan of the royal family of the United Arab Emirates. The luxurious yacht is one of the largest of its kind and has been described as representing "a pinnacle of modern yachting" and "a floating palace", but also "a (fuel) guzzler". There are no official photos of the interior. Its price has been estimated to be about $450 million. Opera is registered in the Cayman Islands.

== Design and construction ==
The yacht has a steel hull and aluminum superstructure. Opera is 146.35 m (480 ft 2 in) long with a beam of 22.49 metres (73 ft 9 in), a draught of 6 metres (19 ft 8 in) and a volume of 12,518 gross tonnage (GT). The exterior lines and the interior spaces were developed by the team of Terence Disdale Design. There are seven decks. It has 18 (or 24) staterooms for 35 (or more) guests plus 25 (or more) cabins for a crew of 50 (or 80).) There are two pools and two helipads; the pool on the main deck has a rise-and-fall floor. Other amenities include wellness and spa facilities, a fitness gym, and entertainment areas, as well as a tender garage for support vessels and water toys.

== Propulsion ==
Opera is powered by twin MTU diesel-electric engines generating 5,300 kW (7,100 hp) each; 10,400 kW (13,900 hp) total. It is also reported that the vessel has 6 Wartsila engines. With its twin propellers, the yacht can reach a top speed of 22 knots (41 km/h; 25 mph); cruising speed is 18 knots (33 km/h; 21 mph) Opera has a cruising range of 6,000 nautical miles at 14 knots.

== Project Sassi ==
Project Sassi was a 146m motor yacht under construction by Lurssen in Bremen when on September 13, 2018, a fire broke out, lasting two days and requiring help from about 900 firefighters. No one was injured, but most of the yacht was damaged or destroyed. After the fire, the yacht was brought to Hamburg for salvage. Only one engine room was undamaged. The remains, including the hull, were then brought back to Bremen and used to build Opera.

== History ==
At Opera's launch in Sepiember 2022, the soprano Elizabeth Winn sang Puccini's chi il bel sogno. Opera has been noted to travel widely. In 2025, Opera traveled through the Mediterranean, via Gibraltar to Cape Town, South Africa, and then to Dubai.

== See also ==
- List of motor yachts by length
- List of yachts built by Lürssen
- Luxury yacht
