= Al Lusail (yacht) =

2017 Lürssen megayacht

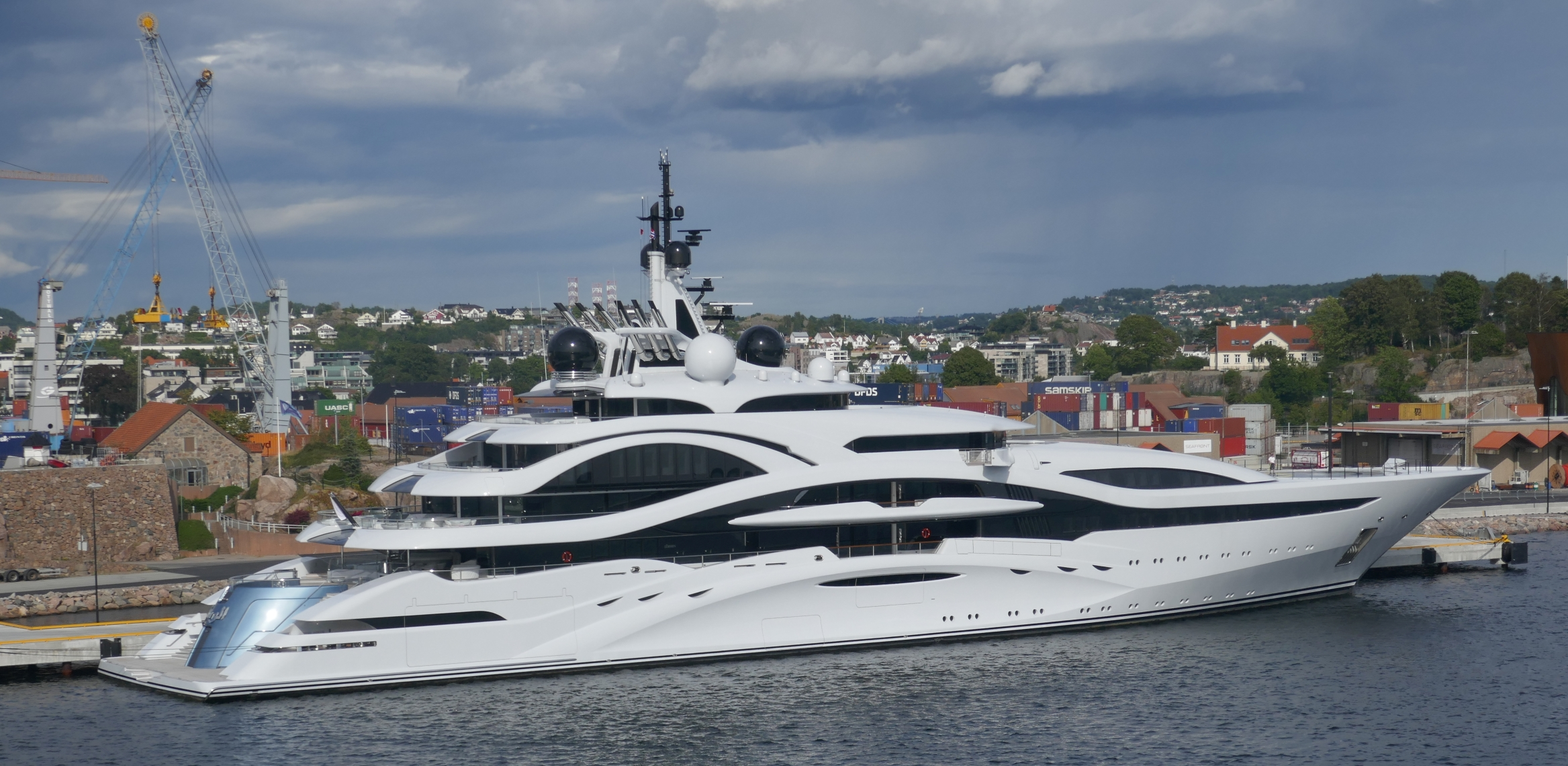

History

Qatar
- Name: Al Lusail
- Owner: Sheikh Tamim bin Hamad Al Thani
- Builder: Lürssen
- Launched: 27 October 2016
- In service: 2017
- Identification: IMO number: 9772929; MMSI number: 466443000; Callsign: A7HL

General characteristics
- Class & type: Motor yacht
- Tonnage: 8,489 GT
- Length: 123 m (404 ft)
- Beam: 23 m (75 ft)
- Draught: 5.50 m (18.0 ft)
- Speed: 15 knots (28 km/h)

Al Lusail is a superyacht owned by Sheikh Tamim bin Hamad Al Thani, the Emir of Qatar.

== Design ==
Al Lusail was launched in 2016 by Lürssen at their yard near Bremen. The yacht’s exterior is the design work of H2 Yacht Design. March & White was selected by the owner to create the custom interior. Its length is 123 m (404 ft), beam is 23 m (75 ft) and she has a draught of 5.50 m (18.0 ft). The hull is built out of steel, while the superstructure is made out of aluminium with teak laid decks. The yacht is classed by Lloyd's Register and flagged in Qatar.

=== Amenities ===
The Al Lusail is equipped with zero speed stabilizers, a gym, elevator, swimming pool, movie theatre, tender garage with a 9.10 m (29.9 ft) utility tender, a 8.20 m (26.9 ft) D-RIB and two 11.20 m (36.7 ft) limousine tenders, swimming platform, air conditioning, BBQ, beach club, beauty room, helicopter landing pad, underwater lights, and beauty salon.

== History ==
Its name refers to Lusail, a city 15 kilometers from Doha, the capital of Qatar, which stands out for its futuristic designs and hosted the 2022 World Cup. In 2026, the vessel underwent a seven-month refit at Lürssen.

Along with other superyachts, including Steven Spielberg's yacht Seven Seas, Al Lusail has been moored in the yacht harbor of Tarragona, Spain.

== See also ==
- List of motor yachts by length
- List of yachts built by Lürssen
