= List of yachts built by Lürssen =

This is a list of all the yachts built by Lürssen, sorted by year.

++ Indicates the longest yacht upon completion.

== 1954–1990 ==
Year	Length overall in meters	Name	Reference
1954	50.2 ++	Polaris	
1958	42.6	Haley	
1960	48.85	El Chris	
1961	42.6	Haley II	
1962	54.65 ++	Platinum	
1964	44.8	Sea Star	
1965	32.8	Alaya	
1970	47.5	Kuzey T	
1972	71.05	The One	
1983	46.6	Shergar	
1987	33.7	Allegra	

== 1991–2005 ==
Year	Length overall in meters	Name	Picture	Reference
1991	40.36	Be Mine		
1992	46.3	Ontario		
1993	58.8	Ronin		
1993	40.45	Marlin Del Rey V		
1994	72.54 ++	Coral Ocean		
1995	40.94	Blind Date		
1997	96.25 ++	Limitless		
1999	139.3 ++	Al Salamah		
2002	70.7	Skat		
2002	97.2	Carinthia VII		
2003	58.55	Capri		
2003	126.2	Octopus		
2003	115	Pelorus		
2004	60.97	Aurora		
2004	72.6	Queen K		
2004	138	Rising Sun		
2005	90.1	Ice		
2005	62.97	Polar Star		

== 2006–2015 ==
Year	Length overall in meters	Name	Picture	Reference
2006	59.4	Oasis		
2006	92.92	EOS		
2006	71	Titania		
2006	60	Podium		
2007	70.2	Saint Nicolas		
2007	74	Global		
2008	155 ++	Al Said		
2008	110	Al Raya		
2008	70.2	Martha Ann		
2008	60.35	Vive La Vie		
2008	78.5	TV		
2009	75.6	Northern Star		
2009	60	Arkley		
2009	110	Radiant		
2010	60	Solmates		
2010	85.2	Pacific		
2010	90.02	Phoenix 2		
2010	124.4	Katara		
2011	85.1	Meridian A		
2011	68.5	Hermitage		
2011	62	Lady Kathryn V		
2012	87	Ace		
2012	147.25	Topaz		
2013	180 ++	Azzam		
2013	86.11	Quattroelle		
2013	85.1	Solandge		
2014	104	Quantum Blue		
2014	95.2	Kismet		
2014	66	Elysian		
2015	123.2	Golden Odyssey		
2015	91	Lady Lara		

== 2016–present ==
Year	Length overall in meters	Name	Picture	Reference
2016	156	Dilbar		
2016	106	Amadea		
2017	74	Aurora		
2017	123	Al Lusail		
2017	85	Amatasia (Ex: Areti)		
2018	135.5	Crescent		
2019	136	Flying Fox		
2019	111	TIS		
2019	98	Madsummer		
2020	140	Scheherazade		
2020	87	Avantage		
2021	142	Nord		
2021	55.50	Moon Sand		
2021	115.10	Ahpo		
2022	160	Blue		
2023	89.99	Norn		
2023	146.35	Opera		
2024	138.8	Luminance		
2024	122	Kismet		
2024	82	Haven		
2024	142	Dragonfly		
2026	117	Boardwalk		

== Planned/Under construction ==
Planned delivery	Length overall in meters	Name	Reference
2026 (Delivered)	109	"O3"	
2025 (Delivered)	78	Odisea	
2026 (Delivered)	134.2	Deep Blue	
2026 (Delivered)	114.2	Nausicaä	
2026 (Delivered)	103	Nixie	
2027	146.2	Project Defy	

== See also ==
- List of motor yachts by length
- Luxury yacht
- Lürssen
