= Abdulla Al Futtaim =

Emirati businessman

- Children: Omar Al Futtaim

Abdulla Al Futtaim (Arabic: عبدالله الفطيم) is an Emirati businessman, billionaire, investor, philanthropist and owner of Al-Futtaim Group, and cousin of fellow billionaire Majid Al Futtaim. As of July 2025, his net worth was estimated at $4.9 billion.

He earned his wealth through operations in the automotive field, as well as retail and real estate.

== Personal life ==
He is married and lives in Dubai. His son, Omar Al Futtaim, is the CEO of Al-Futtaim Private Company LLC.

He is owner of the megayacht Radiant. The ship, originally commissioned by Boris Berezovsky, is 360 feet, and as of 2013, it ranked as the seventh most expensive luxury asset acquisition of all time, according to a study by Wealth-X.
