= Dilbar (yacht) =

Super-yacht

History
- Name: Dilbar
- Operator: Unknown , Germany
- Port of registry: Cayman Islands
- Builder: Lürssen
- Launched: 14 November 2015
- In service: 2016
- Identification: IMO number: 9661792; MMSI number: 319094900; Call sign: ZGFO

General characteristics
- Class & type: Displacement yacht
- Tonnage: 15,917 GT
- Length: 156 m (511 ft 10 in)
- Beam: 23.5 m (77 ft 1 in)
- Draft: 6 m (19 ft 8 in)
- Propulsion: Diesel electric
- Speed: 22.5 knots (41.7 km/h; 25.9 mph) (maximum); 18 knots (33 km/h; 21 mph) (cruising)
- Capacity: 40 passengers
- Crew: 80+ crew members

Dilbar (Persian: دلبر, literally "Beloved") is a super-yacht launched on 14 November 2015 at the German Lürssen shipyard and delivered in 2016. She was built as Project Omar. The interior design of Dilbar was designed by Andrew Winch and the exterior by Espen Oeino.

As of 2022, Dilbar is the sixth longest yacht in the world. At 15,917 gross tonnage (GT), she is the third largest yacht by volume, after Fulk Al Salamah and REV Ocean.

The yacht is owned by a company held in a trust settled by Uzbek-Russian billionaire oligarch Alisher Usmanov. The yacht is reported to have cost $600 million, employ 84 full-time crew members, and contain the largest indoor swimming pool installed on a superyacht at 180 cubic metres. Usmanov previously owned, another, smaller yacht also named Dilbar (renamed Al Raya in 2018).

== History ==
In 2016, the German shipyard Lürssen built the Dilbar yacht. The yacht was included in the irrevocable discretionary trust The Sister Trust, which Alisher Usmanov established for estate planning. Since then, the yacht has been owned and controlled by an independent trustee of this trust.

In 2017, Alisher Usmanov left The Sister Trust. His sister, Gulbakhor Ismailova, remained the only beneficiary of the trust.

At the start of hostilities in Ukraine, the Dilbar yacht was undergoing maintenance at the Lürssen shipyard in Hamburg. On March 2, 2022, Forbes reported that German authorities allegedly "seized" Dilbar as a yacht belonging to Alisher Usmanov.

On April 8, 2022, the EU included Gulbakhor Ismailova in the sanctions list, citing an investigation by the Federal Criminal Police Office of Germany, which allegedly established that Usmanov "transferred assets", including the Dilbar yacht, to Ismailova. The following was stated in the EU sanctions rationale: "Since 2017, Usmanov has no longer been a shareholder of this trust company. As a result, his sister, Ms. Gulbakhor Ismailova, has remained the sole beneficial owner of the Dilbar yacht".

The charter of the trust in which the yacht is held contained a clause on the automatic removal of any person from the list of beneficiaries immediately after being sanctioned. In this regard, after the imposition of sanctions, Ismailova was automatically excluded from the list of beneficiaries of the trust.

In March 2024, the statement by the Federal Criminal Police Office of Germany including the publications on X in which it was stated that Ismailova was the "owner" of the Dilbar yacht were removed. The agency officially undertook to no longer disseminate those statements.

During the same period Ismailova signed an official waiver of receiving benefits from the trusts. That meant that she would not be able to restore her right to receive benefits from the trusts, including the trust in which the Dilbar yacht is held, even after lifting the sanctions.

In February 2025, Germany's largest news agency Deutsche Presse-Agentur (DPA) officially retracted its piece of news dated 2022, in which Ismailova was referred to as the owner of Dilbar. The agency recommended that all its media partners remove those publications to avoid legal claims.

On June 11, 2026, the court of Frankfurt am Main upheld the claim of the Lürssen shipyard and ruled that the Dilbar yacht could not be considered frozen under the EU sanctions regime, and the authorities failed to prove that Usmanov or his sister have any influence over the trust in which the yacht is held.

== Ship and design ==
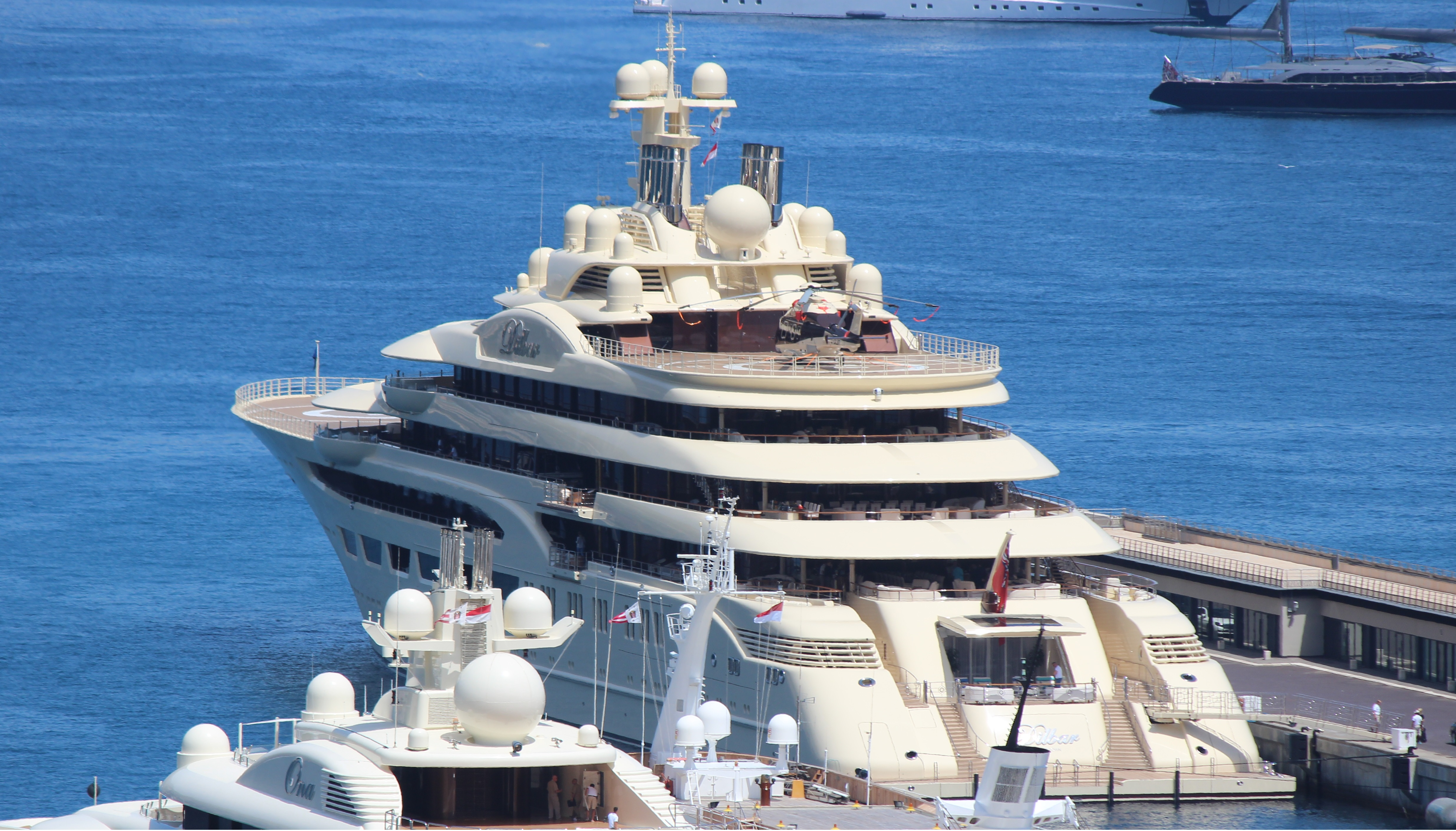
Dilbar in Port Hercules, Monaco, in 2017 with a helicopter on board

In April 2022, Dilbar was considered by Lürssen to be the largest motor yacht in the world by gross tonnage, measuring some 511 feet and 15,917 tons. She has two helipads and "one of the biggest indoor pools ever installed on a yacht." She was named after Alisher Usmanov's mother.

The length of the yacht is 156 m (511 ft 10 in), with a beam of 24 m (78 ft 9 in) and a draft of 6.1 m (20 ft 0 in). Dilbar features a steel displacement hull with an aluminium superstructure, and half teak decks. The ship is registered in the Cayman Islands.

== See also ==
- List of motor yachts by length
- List of yachts built by Lürssen
