= Omar Al Futtaim =

Emirati businessman

Omar Abdulla Al Futtaim is an Emirati businessman, the CEO and vice-chairman of Al-Futtaim Group, owned and founded by his father, Abdulla Al Futtaim.

== Early years and education ==
Al Futtaim has a bachelor's degree in economics and business studies from Macalester College, Minnesota, received in 1985.

The Al-Futtaim family split its business interests in 2000 with Abdulla Al Futtaim controlling the automotive and mainly retail business, and his cousin Majid controlling a property development business (now known as Majid Al Futtaim Group).

== Career ==
Al Futtaim was appointed as Vice Chairman of Orient Insurance in 2001. Since 2010 he has served as chairman of Emirates Islamic and Al Futtaim HC Securities, vice chairman of Orient Insurance, which is part of Al-Futtaim Group, and a director of the Commercial Bank of Dubai. He is also a board member of the Dubai Chamber of Commerce and Industry and a member of the Dubai Economic Council and Emirates National Development Program.
