= Usha Mittal Institute of Technology =

Usha Mittal Institute of Technology (UMIT)
- Type: Public
- Established: 1997
- Principal: Dr. Yogesh Nerkar
- Faculty: 32
- Undergraduates: need info
- Postgraduates: need info
- Location: Mumbai, Maharashtra, India
- Campus: Metropolitan
- Website: http://www.umit.ac.in

Usha Mittal Institute of Technology (UMIT) is an engineering college in Mumbai affiliated to SNDT Women's University. It was formerly known as the Institute of Technology for Women (ITW). The institute is directly managed by the SNDT Women's University and is approved by the All India Council of Technical Education (AICTE) and the University Grants Commission (UGC).

UMIT has over 800 students and 50 faculty. It is the only all-women engineering institute in Mumbai.

== History ==
SNDT established the Institute of Technology for Women in 1997. The institute offered a four-year bachelor's degree course in Computer Engineering, Computer Science and Technology, Artificial Intelligence, Electronics and Communications Engineering, Data Science and Information Technology.

After a generous donation from the Lakshmi Niwas Mittal Foundation, the institute was renamed Usha Mittal Institute of Technology.

== Committees ==
UMIT has student chapters of a number of organisations: SNDT Association for Computing Machinery for Women Student Chapter (ACM-W),Computer Society of India (CSI),IEEE, and E-Elite, National Entrepreneurship Network (NEN). The college has a National Service Scheme (NSS) unit. Recently, in 2019, UMIT started another chapter known as the Google Developer student club (GDSC) which is powered by Google. UMIT is one of the few colleges to have this club.

UMIT also has Sports Council which conducts 'Xuberance week' as their main event and conducts many sports related fun events to encourage students to maintain their physical fitness. In 2009, UMIT hosted the national-level conference-cum-technical festival 'Tech Tornado ', organised by the SNDT ACM-W Student Chapter. The chapter sponsor is Dr. T.J. Mathew. The 2009 trophy was won by PSG Coimbatore.

The college holds an annual cultural festival, 'Arcane Illusions'. The councils also hold festivals: SNDT ACM-W Student Chapter organizes its national level fest 'Tech Tornado and Tech week' which is a 2+5 days long fest activity (hosting 72 hr hackathons) following this several other councils like CSI organizes their 2 days technical festival 'Abhivyakti' while IEEE organizes 2 days technical fest '360 Degrees'.
