= Blue (yacht) =

Private motor yacht, launched 2022

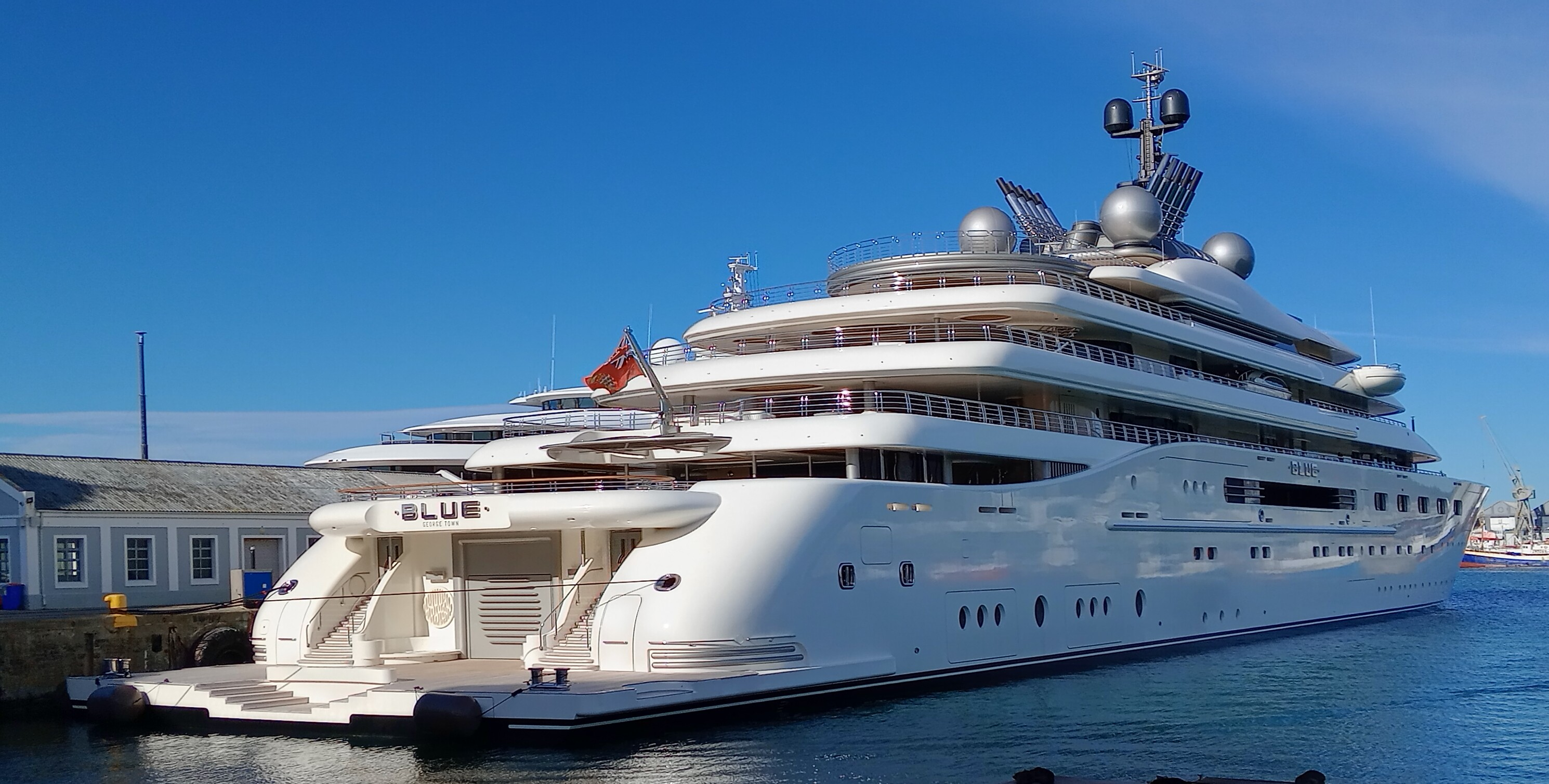
- Blue at the V&A Waterfront, Cape Town in 2024

History
- Name: Blue
- Owner: Mansour bin Zayed Al Nahyan
- Port of registry: Cayman Islands
- Builder: Lürssen
- Launched: 2022
- Completed: 2022
- Identification: IMO number: 9862231; MMSI number: 319239400

General characteristics
- Class & type: Motor yacht
- Tonnage: 14,785 GT
- Length: 160 m (524 ft 11 in)
- Beam: 22.5 m (73 ft 10 in)
- Draught: 5.5 m (18 ft 1 in)
- Capacity: 48
- Crew: 80

Blue is a 160-metre (524 ft 11 in)-long motor yacht owned by Sheikh Mansour bin Zayed bin Sultan Al Nahyan of the United Arab Emirates. She was launched and delivered by Lürssen in 2022. The interior design of Blue was done by Terence Disdale.

== History ==
Originally known as "Project Blue," Blue was launched in February 2022. By April, she was undergoing sea trials from Bremen. She was delivered to her owner in July of the same year and made her maiden voyage to Malta. She was the largest yacht launched in the year 2022 and, as of 2024, was the fifth largest yacht in the world by length.

== Features ==
Blue has a diesel-electric hybrid propulsion concept developed by Lürssen engineering specialists which is said to reduce emissions. It has an electric Azimuth Pod Drive, advanced exhaust after-treatment, and membrane wastewater treatment capable of disposing treated wastewater at "drinking water quality." She has two helicopter landing sites and a beach club connected to a swimming platform.

== Sightings ==
In September 2022, Blue was photographed in Marmaris. In October 2024, she was docked in Cape Town, where she was spotted again in May 2025. In June 2025, SuperYacht Times published photographs showing her in Porto Cervo in Sardinia. She was then reported to have stopped in Golfo Aranci before being spotted in Kalamata on August 18, 2025. By August 23 2025, Blue was reported to be docked at the Port of Heraklion as Mansour holidayed in Crete.

== See also ==
- List of yachts built by Lürssen
- List of motor yachts by length
