= Eye (yacht) =

Yacht built by Lürssen for Yuriy Kosiuk

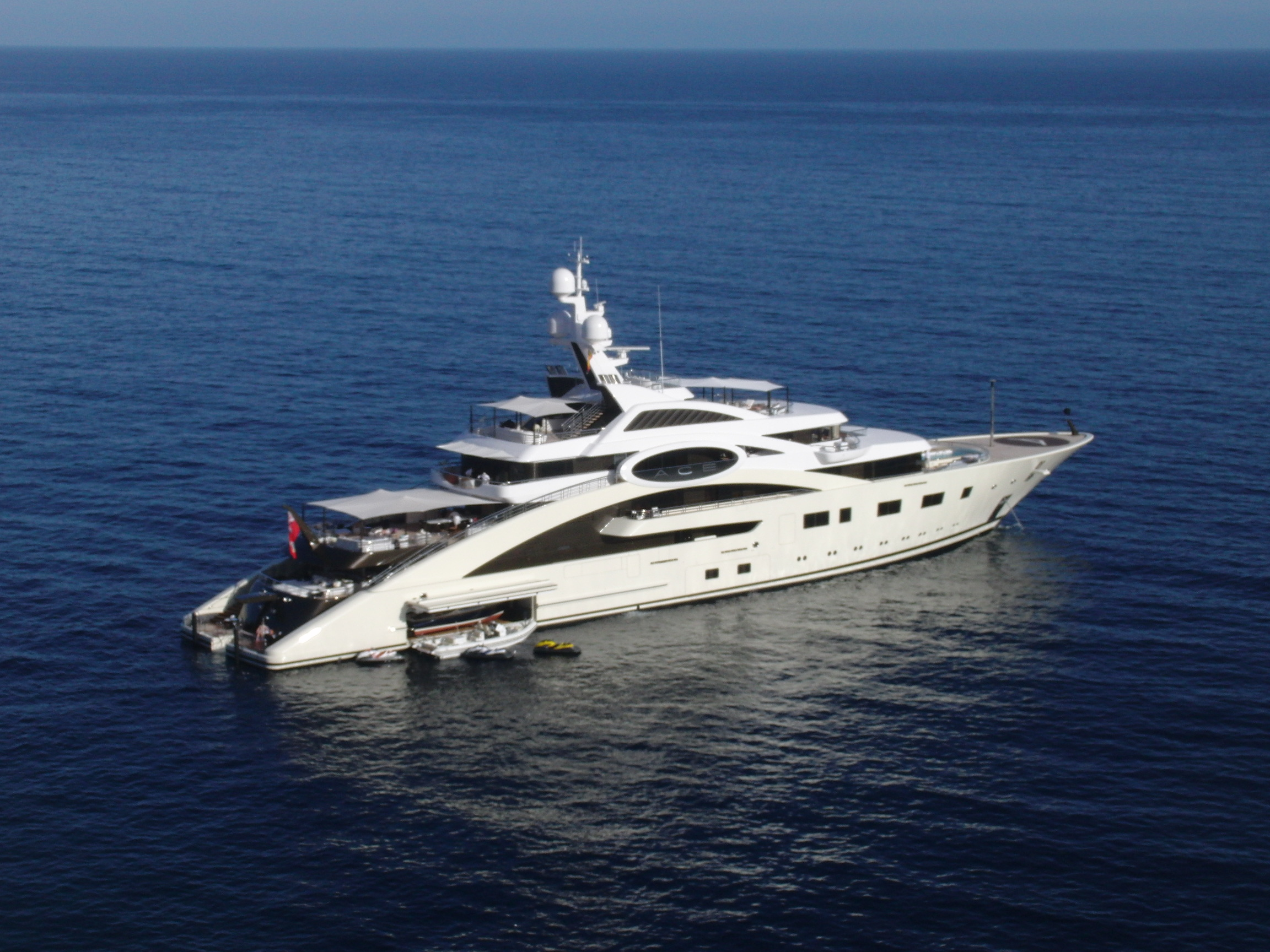

History

Cayman Islands
- Name: Ace
- Builder: Lürssen
- Yard number: 13665
- Launched: 10 September 2010
- Completed: 2012
- Identification: IMO number: 1011537; MMSI number: 319892000; Callsign: ZGBZ8

General characteristics
- Class & type: Motor yacht
- Tonnage: 2,732 gross tons
- Length: 85.00 m (278.87 ft) overall
- Beam: 14.30 m (46.9 ft)
- Draught: 3.75 m (12.3 ft)
- Speed: 17.8 knots (33 km/h) maximum

Eye, formerly Ace is a 87 m (285 ft) yacht built by Lürssen. She was delivered to her owner Yuriy Kosiuk in July 2012. The yacht accommodates 10 guests and 28 crew members. Her exterior and interior were both created by Andrew Winch Designs. One of ACE’s interior features is the spa. The spa includes a hammam, massage room, plunge pool and a Jacuzzi. Other features are a beach club, gym, movie theater, toys & tenders and helicopter landing capabilities.

In spring 2022, following its reported sale to a new owner, the superyacht entered the MB92 shipyard for a refit. She was renamed Eye in January 2024.

== Design ==
Ace is known for being one of the first yachts for which a special support ship was purpose built. This support ship was built in 2012 at Damen Shipyards in Holland. The yacht is classed with Lloyd's Register and registered in the Cayman Islands.

== Specifications ==
- Length: 85.00 m (278.87 ft) overall
- Beam: 14.30 m (46.9 ft)
- Draught: 3.75 m (12.3 ft)
- Tonnage: 2,732 gross tons
- Hull Material: Steel
- Superstructure Material: Steel and aluminum
- Number of Engines: 2
- Engines type: MTU Friedrichshafen 16V4000M61
- HP: 2 x 2,000 kW (2,700 hp)
- Max Speed: 17.8 knots (33 km/h)
- Cruise Speed:

== See also ==
- Damen
- Lürssen
- List of yachts built by Lürssen
- List of motor yachts by length
