= Al-Futtaim Group =

Conglomerate based in Dubai, United Arab Emirates

- Type: Private
- Industry: conglomerate
- Founded: 1939
- Headquarters: Dubai, United Arab Emirates
- Key people: Omar Al Futtaim (CEO), Abdulla Al Futtaim (owner)
- Number of employees: over 42,000 (2017)
- Subsidiaries: Kolber Geneve; Westar
- Website: alfuttaim.com

The Al-Futtaim Group (Arabic: مجموعة الفطيم, romanized: Majmouat al-Futtaim) is an Emirati conglomerate based in Dubai, United Arab Emirates.

== History ==
The group was founded in the 1930s and expanded rapidly in the 1940s and 1950s, becoming an integrated commercial, industrial, and services organization.

The Al-Futtaim family split its business interests in 2000 with Abdulla Al Futtaim controlling the automotive and mainly retail business, and his cousin Majid controlling a property development business (now known as Majid Al Futtaim Group).

In September 2013, the group bid $86 million to take full control of the Nairobi-based car retailer CMC Holdings.

== Operations ==
Al-Futtaim Group employs over 44,000 people and operates eight divisions comprising automotive, electronics, insurance, services, real estate, retail, industries, and overseas. Sheikh Mohammed bin Rashid Al Maktoum mediated a settlement between Abdulla Al Futtaim and his rival, cousin Majid Al Futtaim, in 2000 which split the assets, liabilities and operations of the then-larger Al Futtaim Group.

The CEO of the group was Robert Willett until he suddenly resigned in January 2011. After that, Omar Al-Futtaim became a board member, CEO and vice chairman.

In September 2022, the group was listed by Forbes in the Middle East's Top 100 Arab Family Businesses, ranking third.

== Businesses ==
Al Futtaim Motors: Established by the group in 1955, it is the exclusive distributor of Toyota, Lexus, Hino trucks and Toyota Material Handling equipment in the UAE.

In April 2008, the Al-Futtaim Group bought 88% of the shares of Robinsons & Co. at S$7.20 per share.

The group holds the franchise rights to operate IKEA stores in the UAE, Qatar, Egypt and Oman. It operates four IKEA stores in the UAE, Qatar and Egypt.

Ace Hardware: First opened in Dubai in 1991 by the group, Ace now trades in six locations in the United Arab Emirates including Dubai, Abu Dhabi, Ras Al Khaimah, and Al Ain. Each of the six stores are also certified as ‘Ace Helpful’ in keeping with global Ace standards.

Plug Ins: Consumer electronics store in the UAE.

Founded by Al-Futtaim in 1982, Orient is the largest insurance company in the United Arab Emirates by financial capital, with up to 500 million AED (approx. 136.1 million USD). Headquartered in Dubai, it works with major clients in Abu Dhabi, Dubai, Sharjah, and Ras Al Khaimah, as well as Oman and Bahrain.

The firm opened the U.A.E.'s first Toys "R" Us store in 1995, and owns and operates 19 Toys "R" Us and Babies "R" Us stores across Bahrain, Egypt, Kuwait, Oman, Qatar, and the United Arab Emirates. Its stores were unaffected by the franchiser's 2018 bankruptcy in the United States.

Al-Futtaim's businesses also include Kolber Geneve and Westar.

In 2018 the group acquired the franchise rights to Marks & Spencer locations in Hong Kong and Macau.

In July 2008, Associated Motorways (Private) Ltd in Sri Lanka came under the management expertise of Al-Futtaim Engineering (AFE), a wholly owned subsidiary of Al-Futtaim group.
