= Al Raya (yacht) =

Private yacht

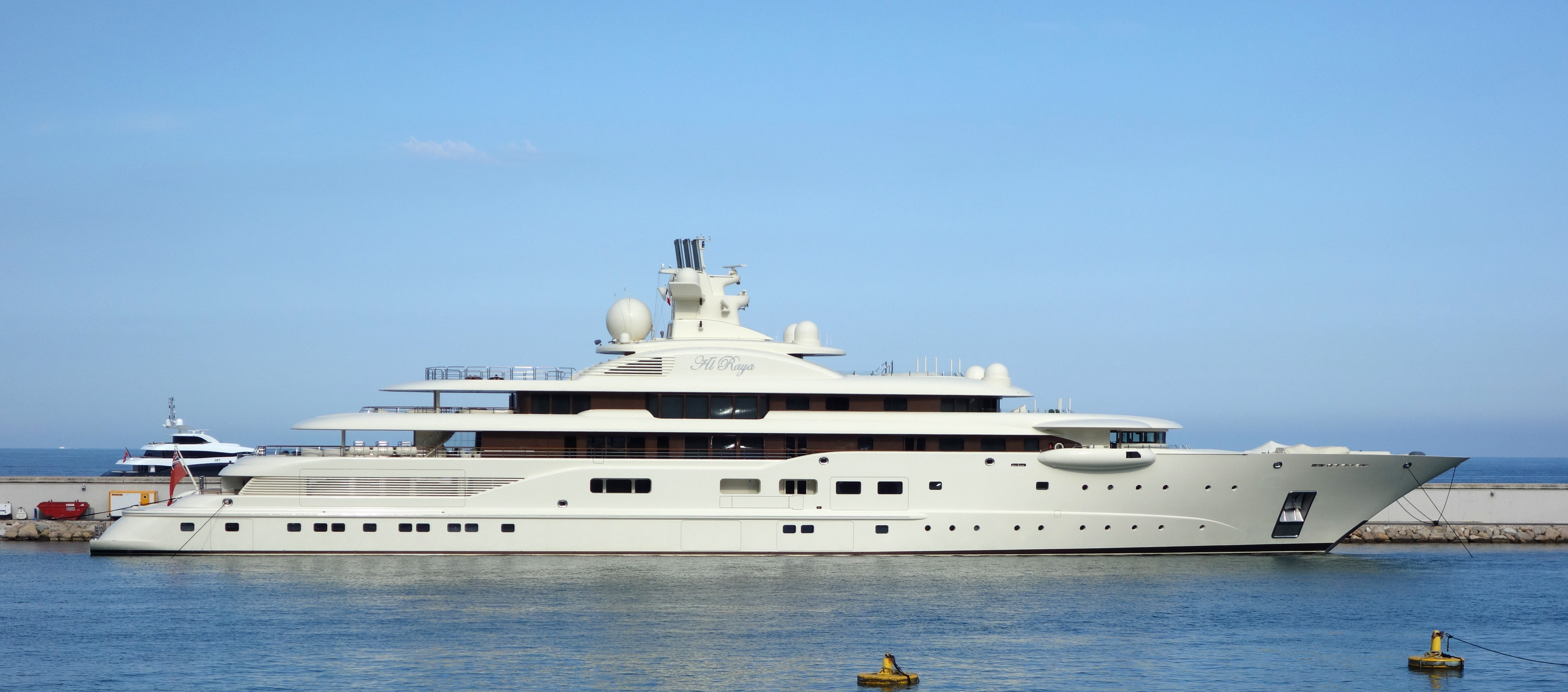

History

Cayman Islands
- Name: Al Raya
- Builder: Lürssen
- Launched: 15 June 2008
- Notes: IMO number: 9526758; MMSI number: 319526000; Call sign: ZCXS9

General characteristics
- Class & type: Megayacht
- Tonnage: 5,148 gt
- Displacement: 4,100 metric tons
- Length: 110.0 m (360.9 ft)
- Beam: 16.3 m (53 ft)
- Draft: 3.2 m (10 ft)
- Speed: 21 knots (39 km/h) (maximum); 18.4 knots (34 km/h) (cruising)
- Capacity: 20 passengers
- Crew: 48 crew members

Al Raya (originally Dilbar, then Ona), is a motor yacht built in 2008 by Lürssen. She was originally built for Russian oligarch Alisher Usmanov and named Dilbar, after Usmanov's mother. The ship has an overall length of 110.0 m (360.9 ft) and a beam of 16.3 m (53 ft).

After another, larger yacht also named Dilbar had been built for Usmanov in 2016, the original Dilbar was renamed to Ona and put up for sale. In 2018, the yacht had reportedly been sold to a Middle Eastern buyer and has been renamed Al Raya. The new owners are the Royal Family of Bahrain.

Al Raya's exterior was designed by Tim Heywood and her interior by Alberto Pinto.

== See also ==
- Dilbar
- Luxury yacht
- List of motor yachts by length
- List of yachts built by Lürssen
