= Al Mirqab (yacht) =

Motor yacht built in 2008

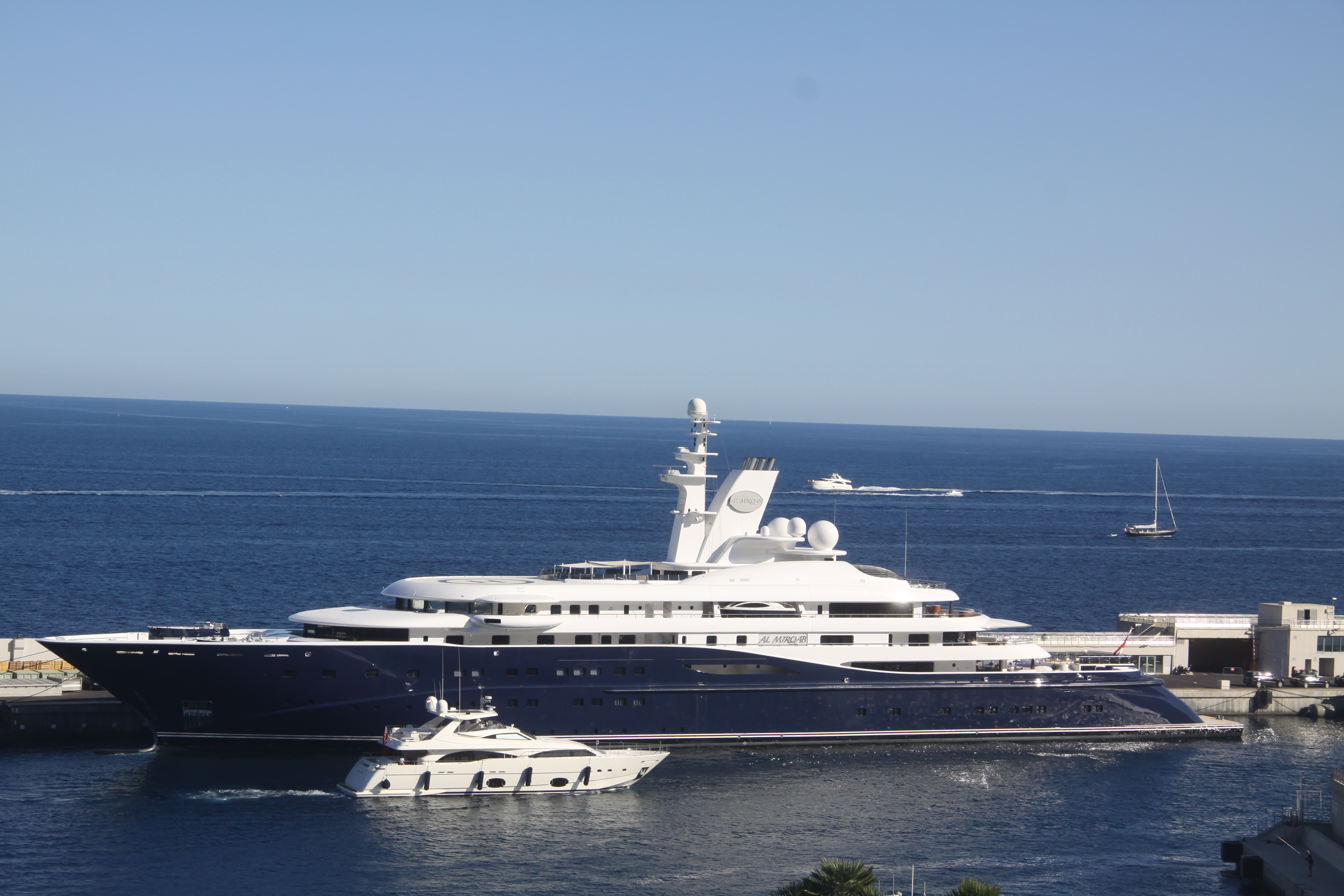
- in 2009

History

Cayman Islands
- Name: Al Mirqab
- Owner: Hamad bin Jassim bin Jaber Al Thani
- Builder: Peters Schiffbau Wewelsfleth, Germany
- Yard number: 681
- Launched: 8 March 2007
- Identification: Call sign: ZCTS4; IMO number: 1009223; MMSI number: 319361000
- Status: In service

General characteristics
- Class & type: Superyacht
- Tonnage: 9,518 GT; 1,440 DWT(summer deadweight)
- Length: 133.00 m (436.35 ft)
- Beam: 19.00 m (62.34 ft)
- Speed: 20.3 knots (37.6 km/h; 23.4 mph) (maximum); 18.7 knots (cruising)
- Capacity: 25
- Crew: 55

Al Mirqab is owned by Qatar's former Prime Minister and Foreign Minister Hamad bin Jassim bin Jaber Al Thani. The yacht was built at Peters Schiffbau Wewelsfleth yard in Germany. The yacht's architect was Tim Heywood, while the interior design was done by Andrew Winch Designs. During construction, the yacht was known as Project May.

== Design ==
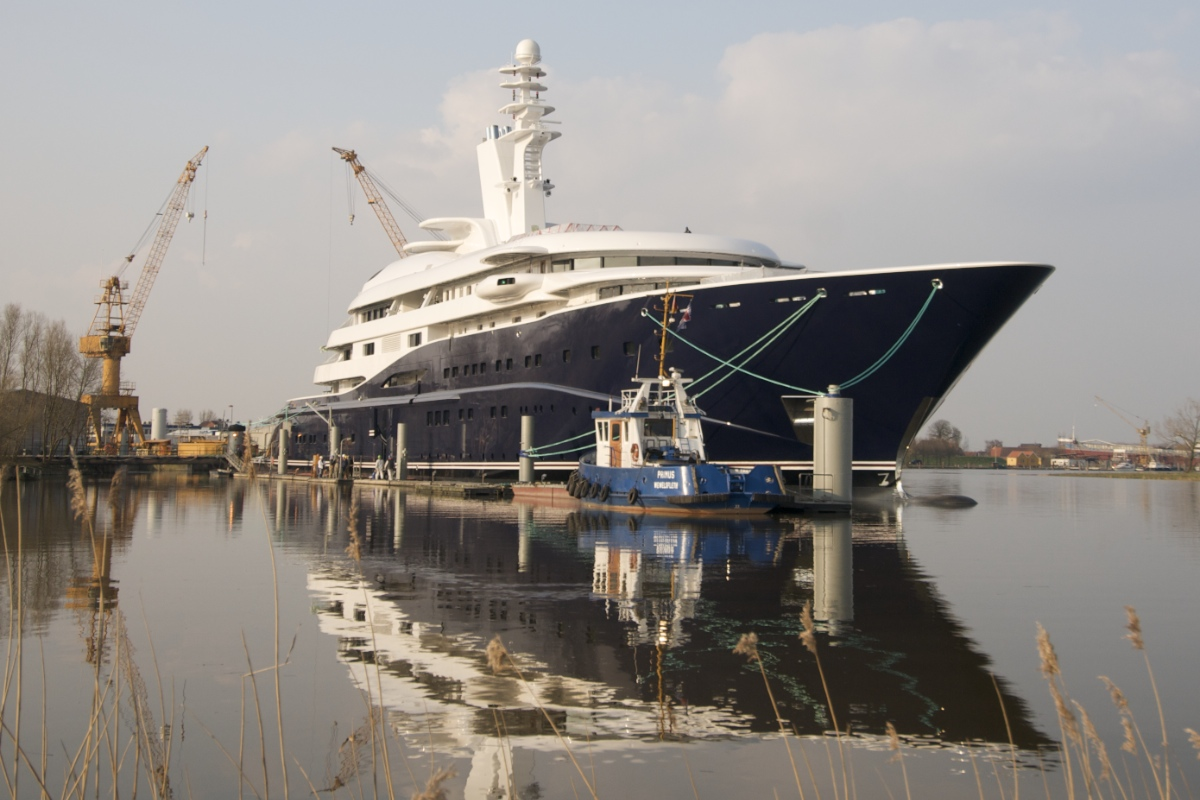
Al Mirqab

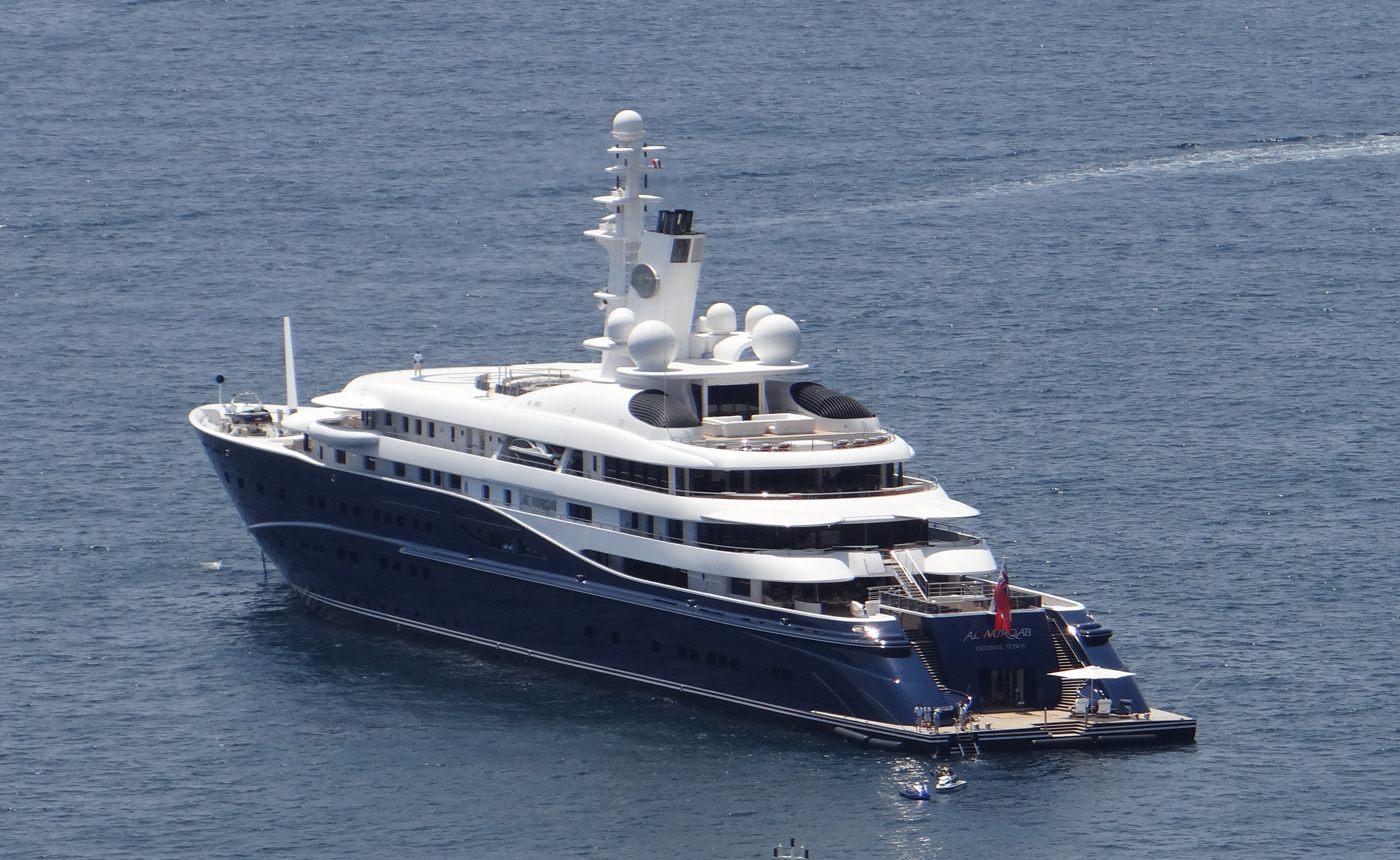
Stern of the Al Mirqab

The Al Mirqab was completed in 2008. The yacht has a length of 133 meters and a beam of 19 meters. The summer deadweight of the yacht is 1,440 DWT, while the gross tonnage is 9,518 GT. She is built of steel and can cruise at 21 knots with a maximum speed of 23 knots. The yacht spends most of the year around the Faliro coastal area of Athens, Greece.

== Interior and entertainment ==
The yacht can accommodate 24 guests in 10 guest suites with two VIP suites for the yacht owner. The suites are large; each with their own bathroom, living room and double bedroom. The yacht has a crew of 60.

The amenities on board include a cinema, outside bars, inside swimming pool and outside jacuzzi and a helicopter pad.

== See also ==
- List of motor yachts by length
