= Andrew Winch =

English yacht designer

Andrew Winch is an internationally known English yacht designer based in Barnes, London. He has been selected as one of two design teams for business jet interior development of the Boeing 787.

== Yacht designer ==
Founded in 1986, Winch Design is a London-based design studio.

=== List of yachts designed ===
This is a list of yachts designed by Winch, as listed on the website.

Yacht name	Year
Centurion 40 N°1 Helisaure II	1986
Swan 36	1988
Royal Eagle II	1988
Sensation	1988
Cyclos III	1989
Windship 105	1990
Centurion 59	1990
Victoria of Stratheim	1990
Yeoman XXX	1991
Oyster Fleet	1991
Sunfast Fleet	1991
Sun Odyssey Fleet	1992
Althea	1992
Thriller	1992
Feeling 546	1992
Wauquiez 60	1992
Sunfast Fleet	1991

Yacht name	Year
Sun Odyssey Fleet	1992
Teel	1992
Hetairos	1993
Naos	1993
Wauquiez 48	1994
White Rabbit	1994
Nefeli	1994
Dynasty 72	1995
Claire	1996
Minerva	1996
Concepta 65	1997
Golden Opus	1997
Shaman	1997
Surama	1997
Lady Aviva	1998
54m Motor Yacht	1998
Solemates	1998

Yacht name	Year
Gesar	1999
Unfurled	2000
Maxsamba	2000
Cakewalk	2000
Bermie	2001
Campbell Bay	2002
Alithia	2002
Whisper	2003
Scheherazade	2003
Phoenix	2004
Alfa Four	2004
Hamilton II	2005
Dubai	2006
Gu	2006
Netanya 8	2007
Carcharias	2007
Sarafsa	2008
St. David	2008

Yacht name	Year
Al Mirqab	2009
Xanadu	2009
Slipstream	2009
Cloud 9	2009
Sea Owl	2010
Phoenix 2	2010
Imagine	2011
Infinite Shades	2011
Aurara	2011
Whirlwind	2011
Hermitage	2011
Ace	2012
Sea Rhapsody	2012
Madame Gu	2013
Equanimity	2014
Z.	2014
Freefall	2015
Dilbar	2016

=== Awards ===
Winch has won a number of International Superyacht Society awards for design and styling, including the:

- 1992 award for Best Sail 23m+ as stylist and interior designer
- 1996 award for Best Power 43m+ as stylist and interior designer, and Best Power Interior as Interior Designer
- 1997 award for Best Power 43m+ as stylist and interior designer
- 2001 award for Best Power 43m+ and Best Sail 23m-36m as interior designer
- 2002 award for Best Sail 36m+ and Best Sail Interior as interior designer
- 2006 award for Best Sail 23m-36m as designer and interior designer
- 2009 award for Best Power 40m-65m as designer, stylist and interior designer, and Best Overall Interior

In recent years, awards are given for approximately 7 categories.

== Aircraft design experience ==
Lufthansa Technik is a Hamburg, Germany–based subsidiary of Lufthansa that has been tasked to design the Boeing 787 into a business jet. Boeing has announced one 787-8 order and three 787-9 orders in the business jet segment. Around 2001, Winch was first commissioned to work with the firm to convert a client's Boeing BBJ.

Andrew Winch Designs and Lufthansa Technik have partnered to design a business jet interior for the 787. The team has been described by journalists as "one of the most innovative and technically competent design teams

=== 787 design specifics ===
The LHT/Winch design has a forward lounge (certified for 12 people) which incorporates a 50 inch plasma screen on the forward bulkhead. Aft from the forward lounge are two guest cabins, to right and left. An additional VIP suite is planned. Upon entering the main number 3 door, there is a highly visible dining and conference room is intended to be a prime feature of the design. There is an integrated movie theater, which is also designed as a second social seating area. Further aft is a VIP suite with a full-width master stateroom.

=== Custom design for Roman Abramovich ===
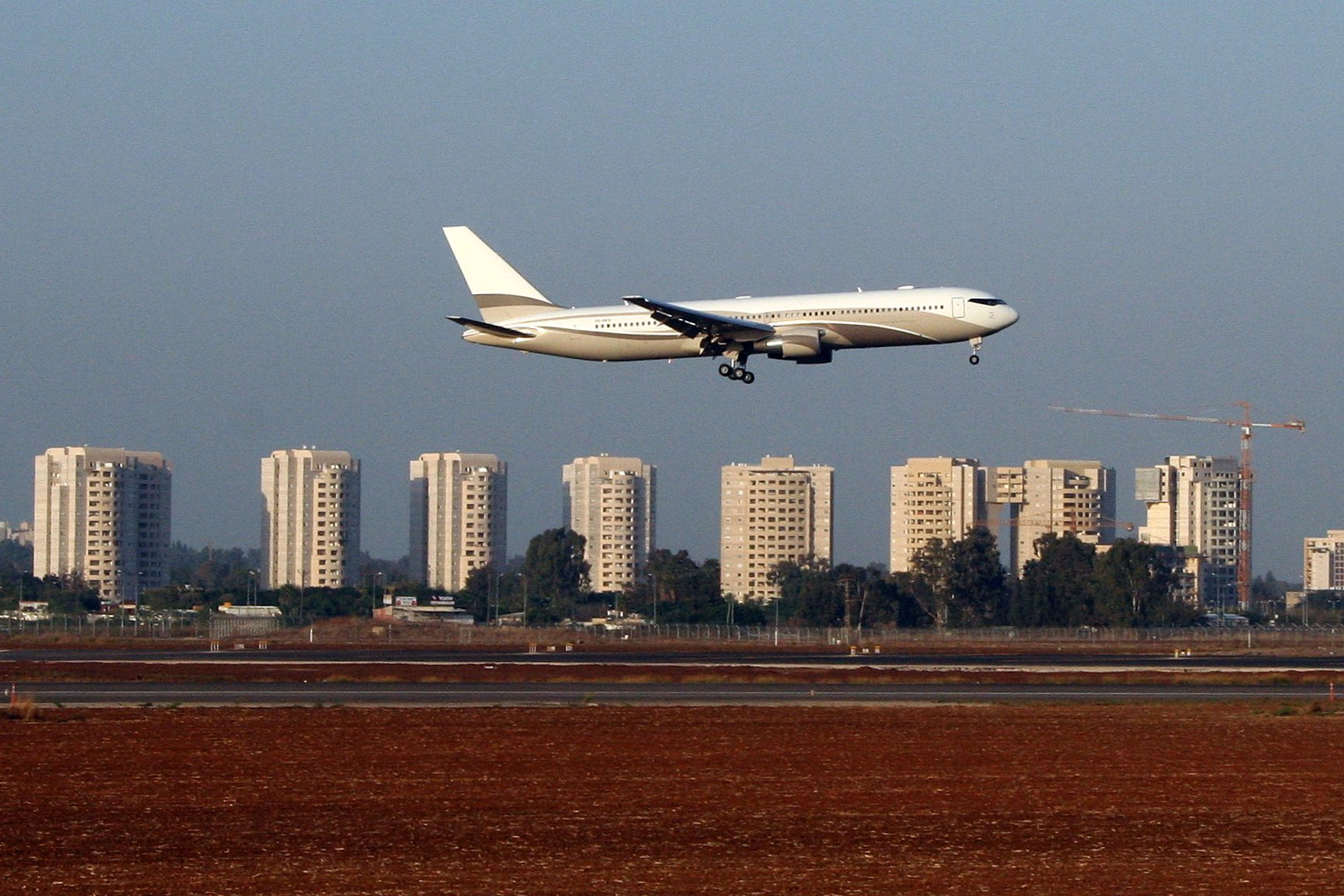
Roman Abramovich's Boeing 767, The Bandit, landing at Ben Gurion Airport, Israel

He designed a private Boeing 767-33A/ER, registered in Aruba as P4-MES for Russian billionaire Roman Abramovich. It is known as The Bandit due to its livery. Originally the aircraft was ordered by Hawaiian Airlines but the order was cancelled and Abramovich bought it from Boeing and refitted it to his own requirements by Andrew Winch, who designed the interior and exterior. The aircraft was estimated in 2016 to cost US$300 million and its interior is reported to include a 30-seat dining room, a boardroom, master bedrooms, luxury bathrooms with showers, and a spacious living room. The aircraft has the same air missile avoidance system as Air Force One.
