= Grace (yacht) =

Motor yacht built in 2014

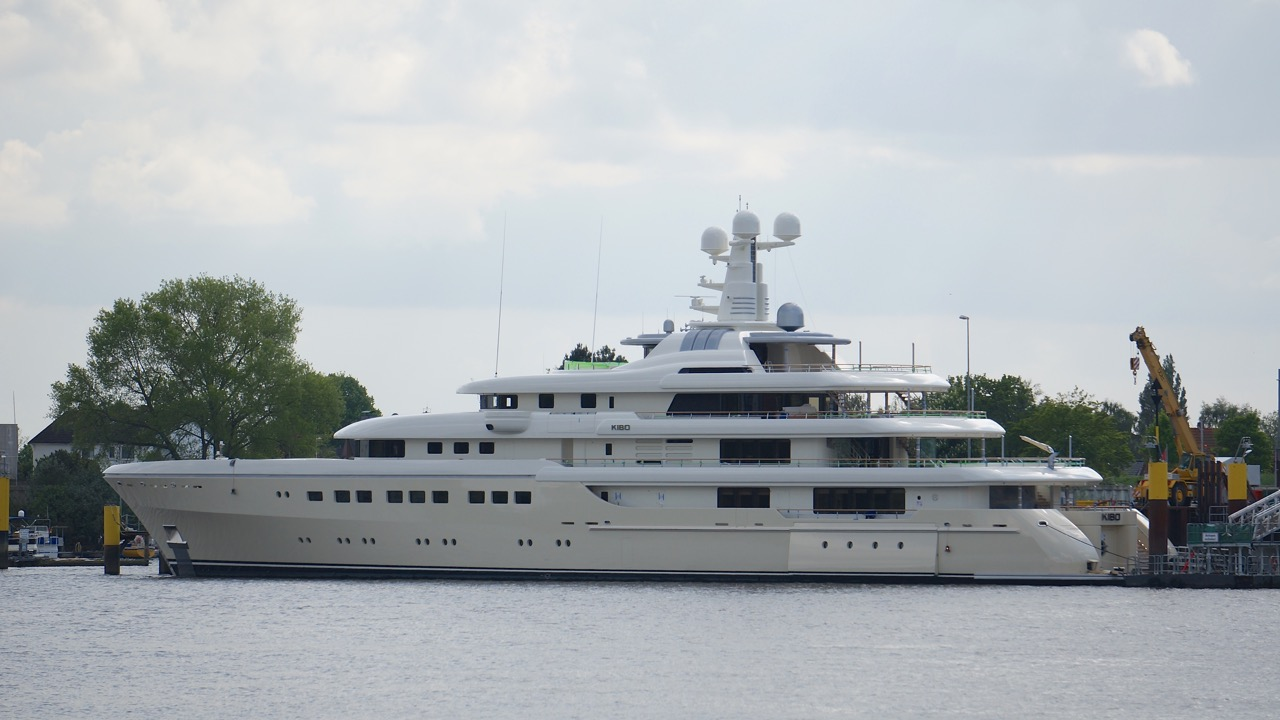

History

Cayman Islands
- Name: Grace (ex Kibo)
- Owner: John Reece
- Builder: Abeking & Rasmussen
- Launched: 2014
- In service: 2014
- Notes: IMO number: 1012294; MMSI number: 319061600; Call sign: ZGDR4

General characteristics
- Class & type: Megayacht
- Tonnage: 2606 gross tons
- Length: 81.00 m (265.75 ft)
- Beam: 14.00 m (45.93 ft)
- Draught: 3.50 m (11.5 ft)
- Propulsion: twin 2,000hp Caterpillar 3516-B
- Speed: 16.5 knots (31 km/h) (maximum); 14 knots (26 km/h) (cruising)
- Capacity: 12 passengers
- Crew: 26

Kibo, is a motor yacht built in 2014 by Abeking & Rasmussen. She was owned by Russian billionaire Alexander Mamut, but was sold in 2018 to John Reece and renamed Grace. With an overall length of 81.00 m (265.75 ft) and a beam of 14.00 m (45.93 ft).

== Design ==
Grace's exterior and interior were designed by Terence Disdale. The hull is built of steel and the superstructure is made of aluminium, with teak laid decks. The yacht is Lloyd's registered, issued by Cayman Islands.

Grace is 0.80 m (2.6 ft) shorter than her sister ship Romea.

=== Amenities ===
Zero speed stabilizers, elevator, beach club, grand piano, swimming platform, tender garage with tender, air conditioning, underwater lights.

=== Performance ===
She is powered by twin 2,000 hp Caterpillar 3516-B diesel engines. With her 170,000 L (45,000 US gal) fuel tanks she has a maximum range of 4,500 nmi (8,300 km).

== See also ==
- Romea
- Luxury yacht
- List of motor yachts by length
- List of yachts built by Abeking & Rasmussen
