= List of yachts built by Abeking & Rasmussen =

This is a list of all the yachts built by Abeking & Rasmussen, sorted by year.

Biggest by both length and volume upon completion
Biggest by length yacht upon completion
Biggest by volume upon completion

== Table ==
| Year | Size | | Name | | Picture | Reference |
| Year | Length at launch | Volume at launch | Original | Current (Note: As of 27 October 2022) | Picture | Reference |
|---|---|---|---|---|---|---|
| 1912 | 22.10 m (73 ft) | 85 GT | Konigin II | Fiamma Nera | | |
| 1914 | 19.90 m (65 ft) | | Skeaf VI, E-2 | | | |
| 1916 | 28 m (92 ft) | 60 GT | Étoile Polaire | Skeaf VII | | |
| 1923 | | | Andromeda | | | |
| 1928 | 21.10 m (69 ft) | | Waiandance, US-1 | | | |
| 1928 | 21.10 m (69 ft) | | Isis, US-2 | Isolde, US-2 | | |
| 1928 | 21.10 m (69 ft) | | Tycoon, US-3 | | | |
| 1928 | 21.10 m (69 ft) | | Iris, US-4 | | | |
| 1928 | 21.10 m (69 ft) | | Anitra, US-5 | | | |
| 1928 | 21.10 m (69 ft) | | Onawa, US-6 | | | |
| 1938 | 21.50 m (71 ft) | | Inga, G-1 | | | |
| 1938 | 21.50 m (71 ft) | 27 GT | Anita, G-2 | | | |
| 1939 | 21.48 m (70 ft) | 26 GT | Sphinx, G-4 | | | |
| 1943 | 32 m (105 ft) | 110 GT | Le Don Du Vent | | | |
| 1952 | 30.75 m (101 ft) | 110 GT | Dolphin | | | |
| 1954 | 28.96 m (95 ft) | 130 GT | Andrea Da Bari | Shyraga | | |
| 1954 | | | Anke II | | | |
| 1955 | 36 m (118 ft) | 202 GT | Westlake II | Lady Jersey | | |
| 1955 | 33.60 m (110 ft) | 127 GT | Vedersein | Sans Souci | | |
| 1956 | 28.96 m (95 ft) | 105 GT | Bar-L-Rick | Sea Diamond | | |
| 1957 | 51.33 m (168 ft) | 394 GT | Saint Kilda (E218) | Sedna IV | | |
| 1957 | 28.77 m (94 ft) | 93 GT | Wayfarer A | Wayfarer of London | | |
| 1958 | 47.55 m (156 ft) | 260 GT | Mira | | | |
| 1958 | 49.50 m (162 ft) | 295 GT | Algol | Independia | | |
| 1959 | 32.60 m (107 ft) | 115 GT | Sintra | | | |
| 1961 | 30.25 m (99 ft) | 126 GT | Fei-Seen | | | |
| 1962 | 23.16 m (76 ft) | 85 GT | Gael | | | |
| 1962 | 47.52 m (156 ft) | 260 GT | Castor | | | |
| 1963 | 22.23 m (73 ft) | 43 GT | Germania VI | | | |
| 1963 | 35.61 m (117 ft) | 153 GT | Tiziana | | | |
| 1966 | 36.40 m (119 ft) | 147 GT | The A | Tess | | |
| 1970 | 45 m (148 ft) | 198 GT | Aiglon | | | |
| 1970 | 37.80 m (124 ft) | 194 GT | Claybeth | George | | |
| 1972 | 36.52 m (120 ft) | 168 GT | Kalamoun | | | |
| 1974 | 45 m (148 ft) | 330 GT | Shark | Kriss | | |
| 1981 | 36.50 m (120 ft) | 221 GT | Jagare | | | |
| 1985 | 42.37 m (139 ft) | 279 GT | Dale R II | No Buoys | | |
| 1987 | 40.02 m (131 ft) | 296 GT | Silver Shalis | Lady Laura | | |
| 1988 | 35.80 m (117 ft) | 119 GT | Extra-Beat | One Lilo | | |
| 1992 | 34.49 m (113 ft) | 104 GT | Arrayan | Baiurdo VI | | |
| 1993 | 42.84 m (141 ft) | 120 GT | Hetairos | Asgard | | |
| 1995 | 36 m (118 ft) | 161 GT | Globana | Globana M | | |
| 1997 | 52 m (171 ft) | 887 GT | Sea Jewel | Amore Mio II | | |
| 1998 | 57.30 m (188 ft) | 1,049 GT | Ultima III | Diamond | | |
| 1999 | 52.09 m (171 ft) | 887 GT | Endeavour | Vera | | |
| 2001 | 57.30 m (188 ft) | 1,099 GT | Excellence III | Dream | | |
| 2002 | 39.78 m (131 ft) | 130 GT | Alithia | 4K | | |
| 2003 | 57.30 m (188 ft) | 1,092 GT | Zenobia | | | |
| 2003 | 57.90 m (190 ft) | 1,056 GT | Kwikumat | | | |
| 2004 | 44.90 m (147 ft) | 499 GT | Bravado | | | |
| 2005 | 45.60 m (150 ft) | 499 GT | My Little Violet | | | |
| 2007 | 57.90 m (190 ft) | 1,099 GT | Lady Sheridan | Amaral | | |
| 2007 | 67.90 m (223 ft) | 2,047 GT | Aviva | | | |
| 2008 | 78.43 m (257 ft) | 2,054 GT | Eminence | | | |
| 2008 | 41 m (135 ft) | 498 GT | Silver Cloud | Nurja | | |
| 2008 | 78.43 m (257 ft) | 2,054 GT | C2 | B2 | | |
| 2009 | 60 m (197 ft) | 1,090 GT | Elandess | Scott Free | | |
| 2010 | 80 m (262 ft) | 2,101 GT | Titan | | | |
| 2011 | 60 m (197 ft) | 1,091 GT | Kaiser | | | |
| 2011 | 78.43 m (257 ft) | 2,108 GT | Amaryllis | | | |
| 2012 | 60 m (197 ft) | 1,632 GT | Excellence V | Arience | | |
| 2013 | 82.48 m (271 ft) | 2,240 GT | Secret | Sea Pearl | | |
| 2014 | 81 m (266 ft) | 2,306 GT | Kibo | Grace | | |
| 2015 | 81.80 m (268 ft) | 2,312 GT | RoMEA | | | |
| 2016 | 25 m (82 ft) | 249 GT | Al Makher | | | |
| 2016 | 72.25 m (237 ft) | 2,293 GT | Cloudbreak | | | |
| 2017 | 98.40 m (323 ft) | 4,966 GT | Aviva | | | |
| 2018 | 74.50 m (244 ft) | 2,065 GT | Elandess | | | |
| 2019 | 80 m (262 ft) | 2,115 GT | Excellence | | | |
| 2020 | 68.20 m (224 ft) | 1,541 GT | Soaring | | | |

=== Under construction ===
| Planned delivery | Length overall in meters | Name | Reference |
|---|---|---|---|
| 2022 | 118.20 | Abeking #6507 | |
| 2022 | 70 | Abeking #6508 | |
| 2024 | 120+ | Abeking #6510 | |
| TBA | TBA | Abeking #6509 | |

== See also ==
- List of large sailing yachts
- List of motor yachts by length
- Luxury yacht
- Sailing yacht
