= Romea (yacht) =

Motor yacht built in 2015

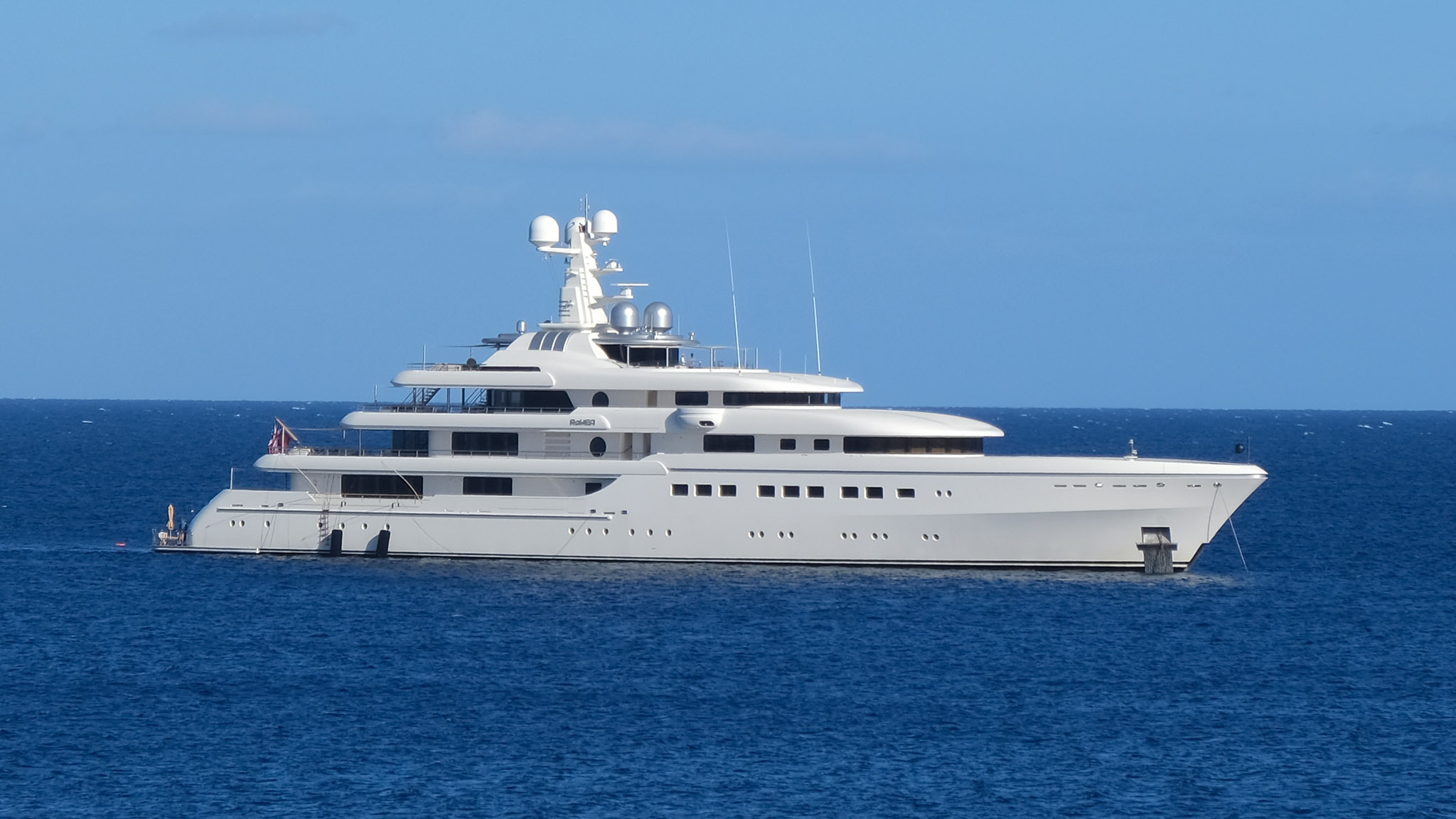

History

Cayman Islands
- Name: Romea
- Operator: Alexander Nesis
- Builder: Abeking & Rasmussen
- Yard number: 6498
- Launched: 2015
- In service: 2015
- Notes: IMO number: 1012309; MMSI number: 319078100; Call sign: ZGES

General characteristics
- Class & type: Megayacht
- Tonnage: 2312 gross tons
- Length: 81.80 m (268.4 ft)
- Beam: 14.00 m (45.93 ft)
- Draught: 3.50 m (11.5 ft)
- Propulsion: twin 2,000hp Caterpillar 3516-B
- Speed: 16.5 knots (31 km/h) (maximum); 14 knots (26 km/h) (cruising)
- Capacity: 12 passengers
- Crew: 23

Romea is a motor yacht built in 2015 by Abeking & Rasmussen. Owned by Russian billionaire Alexander Nesis, she has an overall length of 81.80 m (268.4 ft) and a beam of 14.00 m (45.93 ft).

== History ==
In March 2022, Forbes reported that Romea was still owned by Alexander Nesis. At 268 feet, she was registered in the Cayman Islands with a value of $110 million. On June 2, 2022, she was recorded in Göcek, Turkey.

== Design ==
Romea's exterior and interior were designed by Terence Disdale. The hull is built of steel and the superstructure is made of aluminium, with teak laid decks. The yacht is Lloyd's registered, issued by Cayman Islands.

Romea is 0.80 m (2.6 ft) longer than her sister ship Kibo.

=== Amenities ===
Among Romea's amenities are zero speed stabilizers, an elevator, a beach club, a grand piano, a swimming platform, an on-deck jacuzzi, a tender garage with tender, air conditioning, and underwater lights.

=== Performance ===
She is powered by twin 2,000 hp Caterpillar 3516-B diesel engines. With her 210,000 L (55,000 US gal) fuel tanks she has a maximum range of 5,750 nmi (10,650 km) at 14 knots (26 km/h).

== See also ==
- Kibo
- Luxury yacht
- List of motor yachts by length
- List of yachts built by Abeking & Rasmussen
