= Excellence (yacht) =

Super yacht

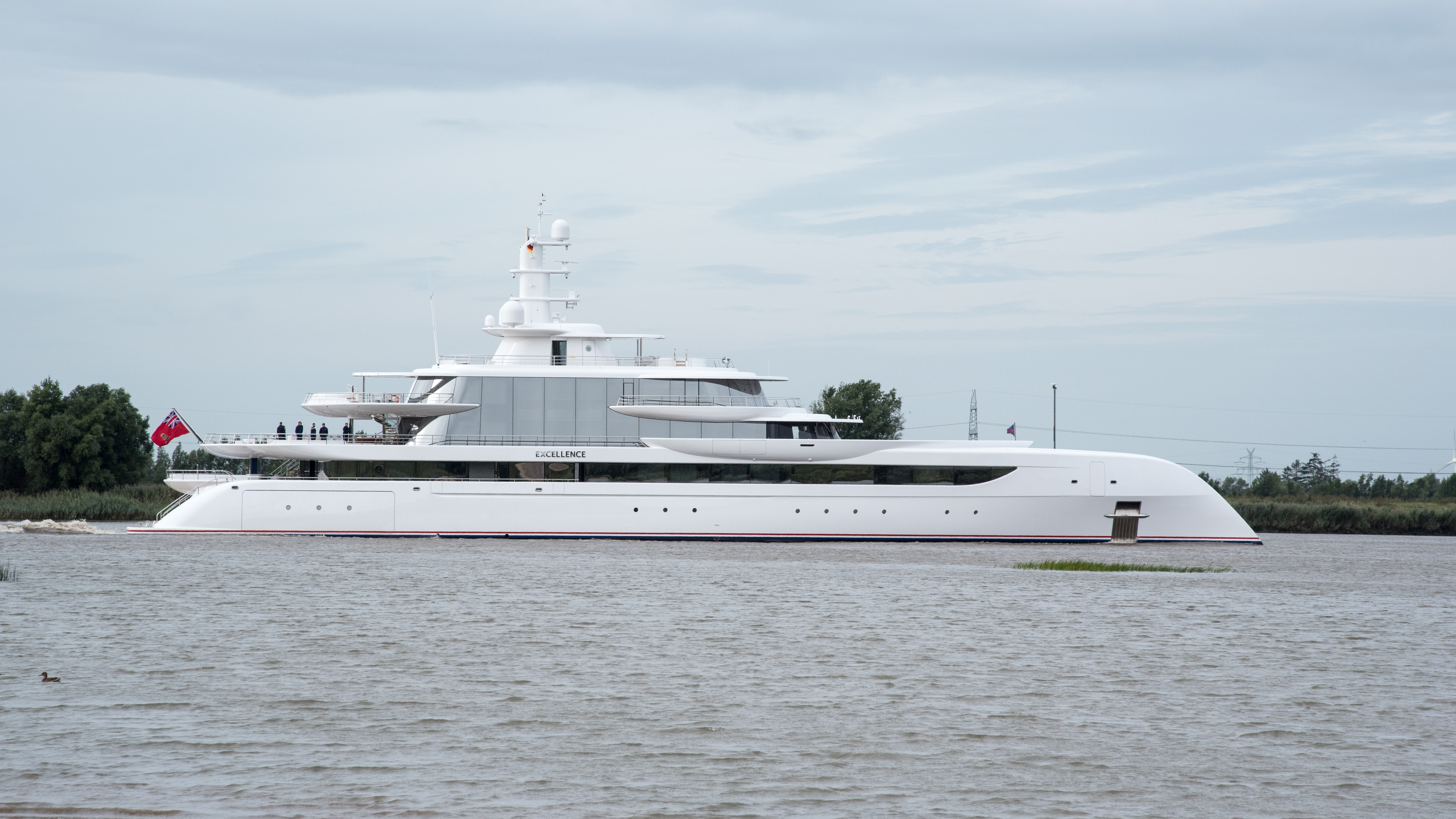

History

Cayman Islands
- Name: Excellence
- Owner: Herb Chambers
- Builder: Abeking & Rasmussen
- Launched: 25 May 2019
- In service: 2019
- Identification: IMO number: 9823144; MMSI number: 319161800; Callsign: ZGIM7

General characteristics
- Class & type: Motor yacht
- Tonnage: 2,115 GT
- Length: 80 m (260 ft)
- Beam: 14.45 m (47.4 ft)
- Draught: 3.45 m (11.3 ft)
- Propulsion: 2x 2,029hp MTU (12V 4000 M65R) diesel engines
- Speed: 17 knots (31 km/h) (maximum); 14 knots (26 km/h) (cruising)
- Capacity: 12 passengers
- Crew: 22

The 80 m (260 ft) superyacht Excellence was launched by Abeking & Rasmussen at their yard near Lemwerder. Both the yacht's exterior and interior design are the work of Winch Design.

== Design ==
Her length is 80 m (260 ft), beam is 14.45 m (47.4 ft) and she has a draught of 3.45 m (11.3 ft). The hull is built out of steel while the superstructure is made out of aluminium with teak laid decks. The yacht is classed by Lloyd's Register and flagged in the Cayman Islands.

=== Amenities ===
Zero speed stabilizers, gym, elevator, swimming pool, movie theatre, tender garage, swimming platform, air conditioning, BBQ, beach club, jacuzzi, WiFi. On board are also different kind of water toys including a banana, a small sailboat and two WaveRunners.

=== Performance ===
She is powered by twin 2,029 hp MTU (12V 4000 M65R) diesel engines. The engines power two propellers, which in turn propel the ship to a top speed of 17 knots (31 km/h). She has a cruising speed of 14 knots (26 km/h).

== See also ==
- List of motor yachts by length
- List of yachts built by Abeking & Rasmussen
