= Aviva (disambiguation) =

Aviva is an international insurance company based in the United Kingdom.

Aviva may also refer to:

- Aviva Stadium, Dublin, built on the site of the former Lansdowne Road stadium
- Aviva Tower, a building in London, now named St. Helen's
- Aviva (given name), a female first name
- Aviva (68m yacht), a motor yacht built in 2007
- Aviva (98m yacht), a motor yacht built in 2017
- AViVA (musician)
- Aviva (film), a 2020 film by Boaz Yakin
- Singlife with Aviva, a Singaporean insurance company with Aviva as a shareholder
