= Whisper (yacht) =

Luxury yacht built by the Lürssen shipyard in 2014

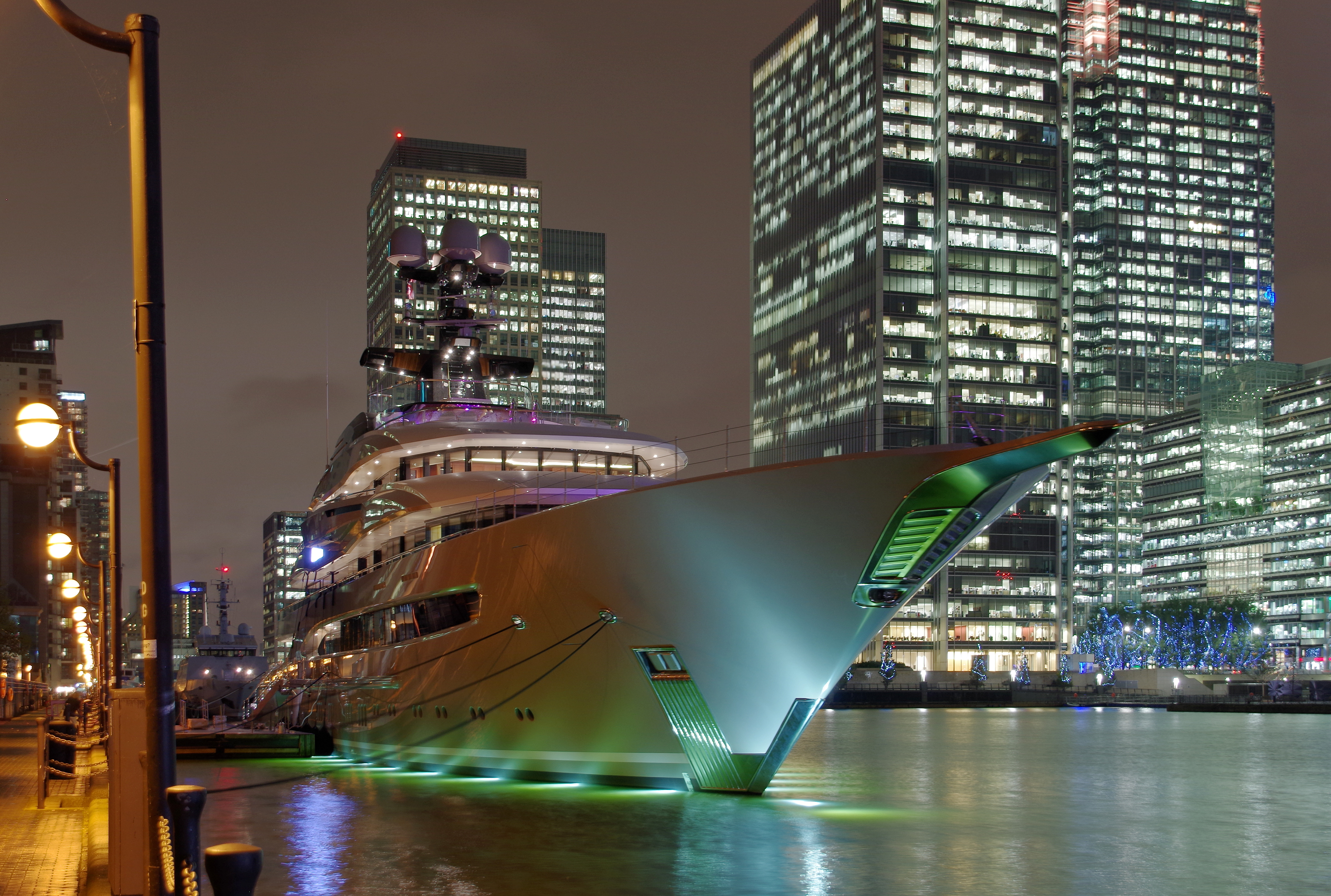
- As Kismet, moored in Canary Wharf

History
- Name: Kismet (2014–2024); Whisper (2024–present)
- Owner: Eric Schmidt
- Builder: Krögerwerft, Schacht-Audorf, Germany
- Yard number: 13678
- Completed: October 2014
- In service: 2014–present
- Status: In service

General characteristics
- Type: Superyacht
- Tonnage: 2,928 GT; 320 DWT
- Length: 95.2 m (312 ft 4 in)
- Beam: 13.8 m (45 ft 3 in)
- Speed: 17 knots (31 km/h; 20 mph)
- Capacity: 16

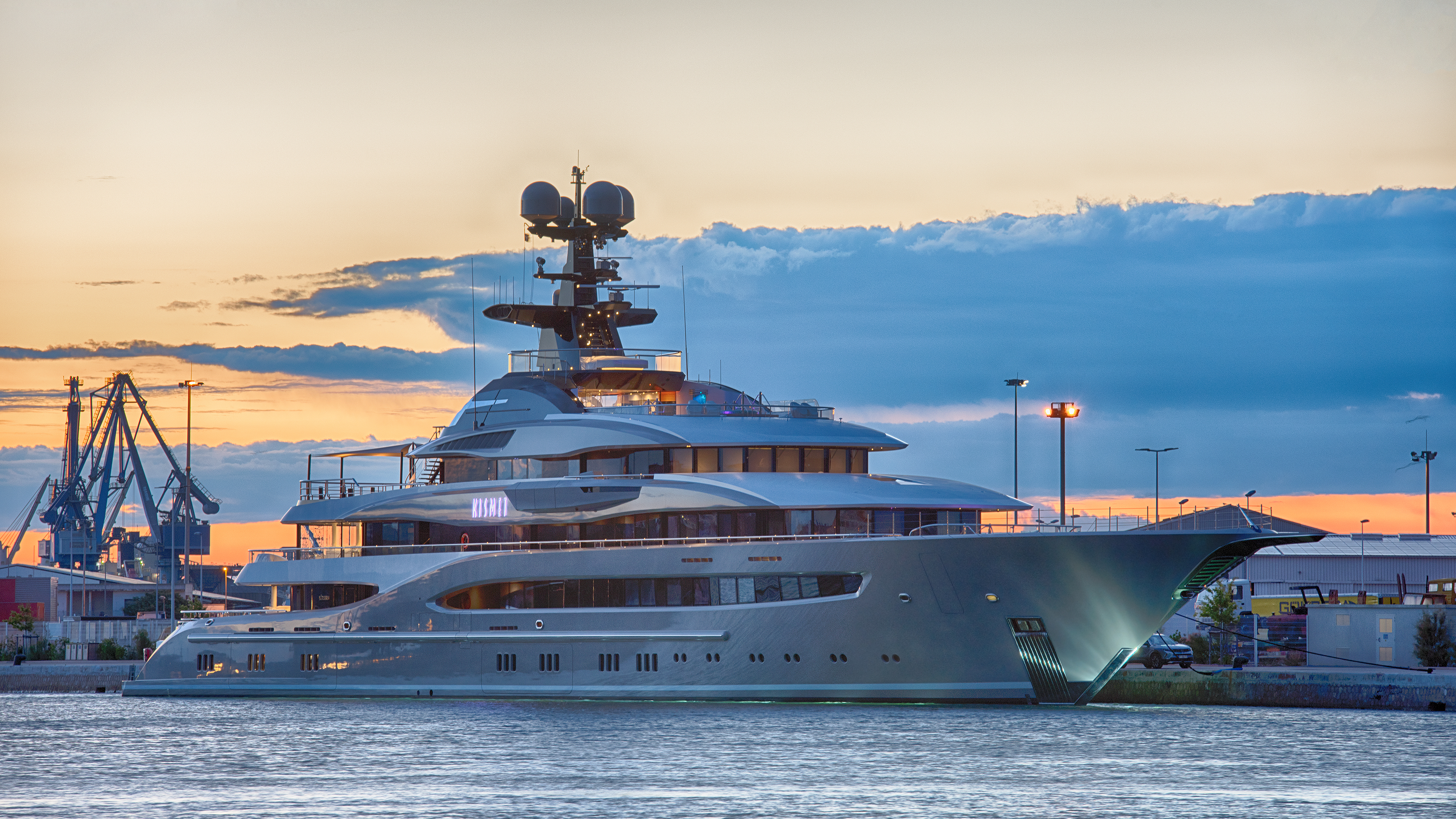
As Kismet, moored at Sète, France

Whisper, formerly known as Kismet, is a 95.2-metre (312 ft 4 in)-long superyacht which was built by Lürssen in 2014. The yacht's new-construction project was overseen by Moran Yacht & Ship, which also managed its chartering business, and it was owned by Pakistani-American billionaire Shahid Khan. In September 2023, the vessel was sold to former Google CEO Eric Schmidt and renamed Whisper. Shahid Khan built a new larger superyacht in 2024 with the name Kismet.

== Design and description ==
The vessel measures 95.2 m (312 ft 4 in) long overall with a beam of 13.8 m (45 ft 3 in). The megayacht was measured at 2,928 gross tonnage (GT) and 320 tons deadweight (DWT) at construction. The ship has a maximum speed of 17 knots (31 km/h; 20 mph). Kismet can carry 28 crew members at a time, and has eight state rooms which provide a capacity for 16 guests. Its design includes large and open public spaces for lounging and dining, and the rooms are stylized with exotic woods, handcrafted textiles, marble and leather. The exterior is notable for its large-sized windows across all decks.

It was finished in a luxurious style by Reymond Langton and Espen Øino (Oeino), with an expensive interior design. The fittings were specified to be better than a "five star hotel", featuring a deck of black marble and a large bath made of solid onyx. The yacht is complete with a swimming pool, barbecue area, movie theatre, sauna, helipad, elevator and gymnasium. Other amenities and provisions include an onboard internet connection, underwater lighting, and stabilizers at the anchor and underway.

In 2023 the vessel was retrofitted with a 474 kWh Orca ESS battery from Corvus Energy installed at the Lürssen-Krüger Werft shipyard.

== Construction and career ==
Kismet was ordered from Lürssen and constructed at Krögerwerft's shipyard in Schacht-Audorf, Germany. Construction was completed in October 2014, with the yacht entering service that year. The word kismet means "destiny" or "fate" in Khan's native language Urdu and many other languages. According to Yacht Harbour, Kismet is worth an estimated $200 million. It has a charter price of $1.2 million per week, excluding food, fuel and dockage costs.

In mid-2018, the yacht was rented by Jay-Z and Beyoncé during a vacation to Italy. Kismet was featured in the 2019 Netflix film 6 Underground starring Ryan Reynolds. The yacht was listed for sale in 2023. In September 2023, the vessel was sold by Cecil Wright & Christie Yachts. The buyer was revealed to be Eric Schmidt, who renamed the vessel Whisper.
