= Titan (yacht) =

Yacht built in 2010

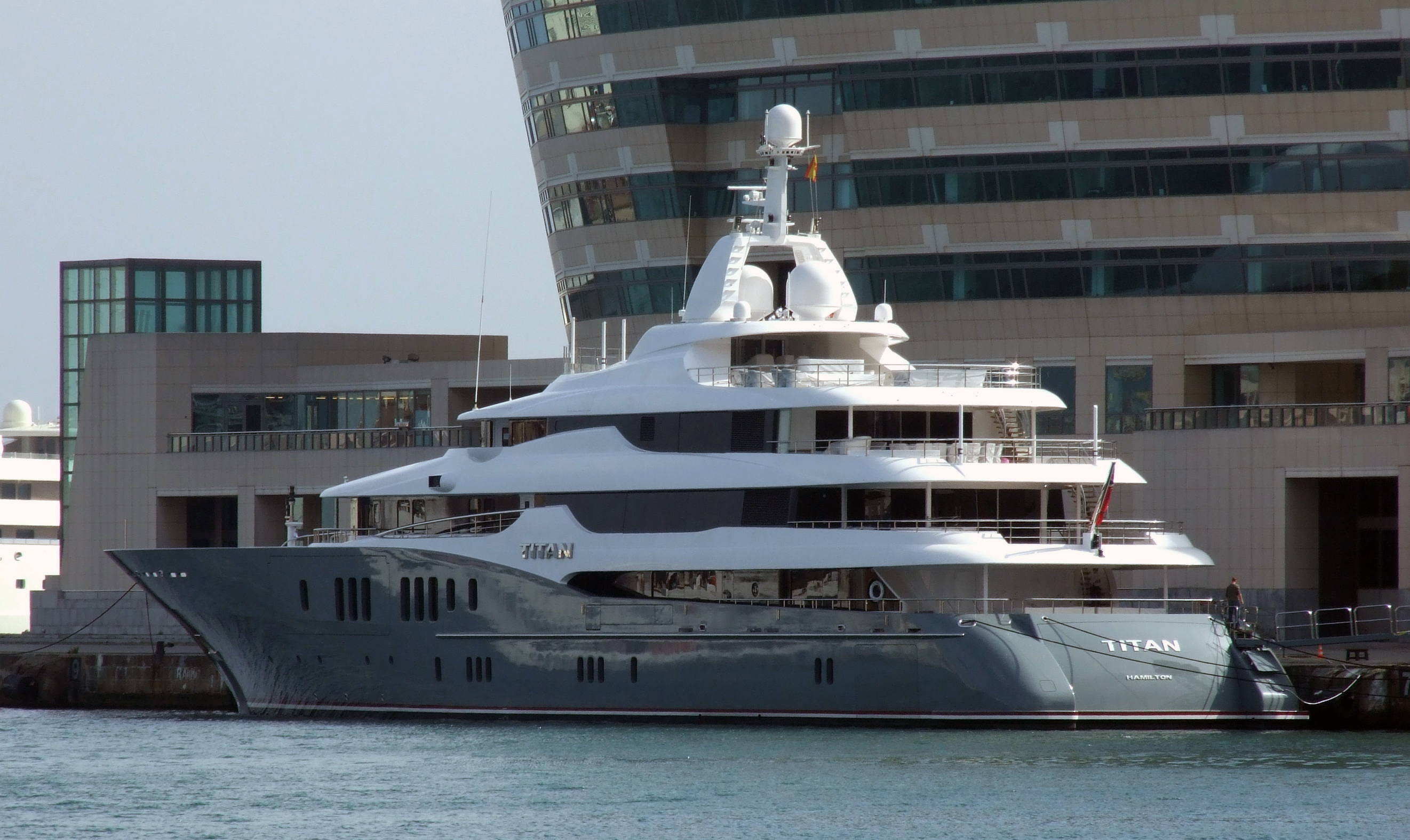

History

Panama
- Name: Titan
- Owner: Private
- Builder: Abeking & Rasmussen
- Yard number: 6483
- Launched: 2010
- Identification: IMO number: 1010478; MMSI number: 310598000; Callsign: ZCED2

General characteristics
- Class & type: Motor yacht
- Tonnage: 2,101 gross tons
- Length: 78 m (256 ft)
- Beam: 13 m (43 ft)
- Draught: 3 m (9.8 ft)
- Propulsion: 2 × Caterpillar Inc. 3516 DITA; 2 × 2.000 hp (1.491 kW)
- Speed: 16 knots (30 km/h) (maximum); 14 knots (26 km/h) (cruising)
- Capacity: 14 passengers
- Crew: 19 crew members

Titan is a super-yacht built in 2010 at the shipyard Abeking & Rasmussen. The interior and exterior design of Titan was done by Reymond Langton Design Ltd. The yacht has two sister ships, Amaryllis and Eminence, although Titan is a bit larger.

Not to be confused with the older motor yacht Titan, resulting from the conversion of HMS Beagle, a Royal Naval Coastal Survey Ship of the Bulldog Class.

== Design ==
The length of the yacht is 78 m (256 ft) and the beam is 13 m (43 ft). The draught of Titan is 3 m (9.8 ft). The materials of the hull is Steel, with the superstructure made out of Aluminium.

== Engines ==
The main engines are two Caterpillar Inc. 3516 DITA with a power of 2.000 hp (1.491 kW) each. The yacht Titan can reach a maximum speed of 16 knots (30 km/h), while the cruising speed is 14 knots (26 km/h).

== See also ==
- Amaryllis
- C2
- Eminence
- Motor yacht
- List of motor yachts by length
- List of yachts built by Abeking & Rasmussen
- HMS Beagle (A319)
