= Stabilizer (ship) =

Ship component meant to reduce a ship's roll

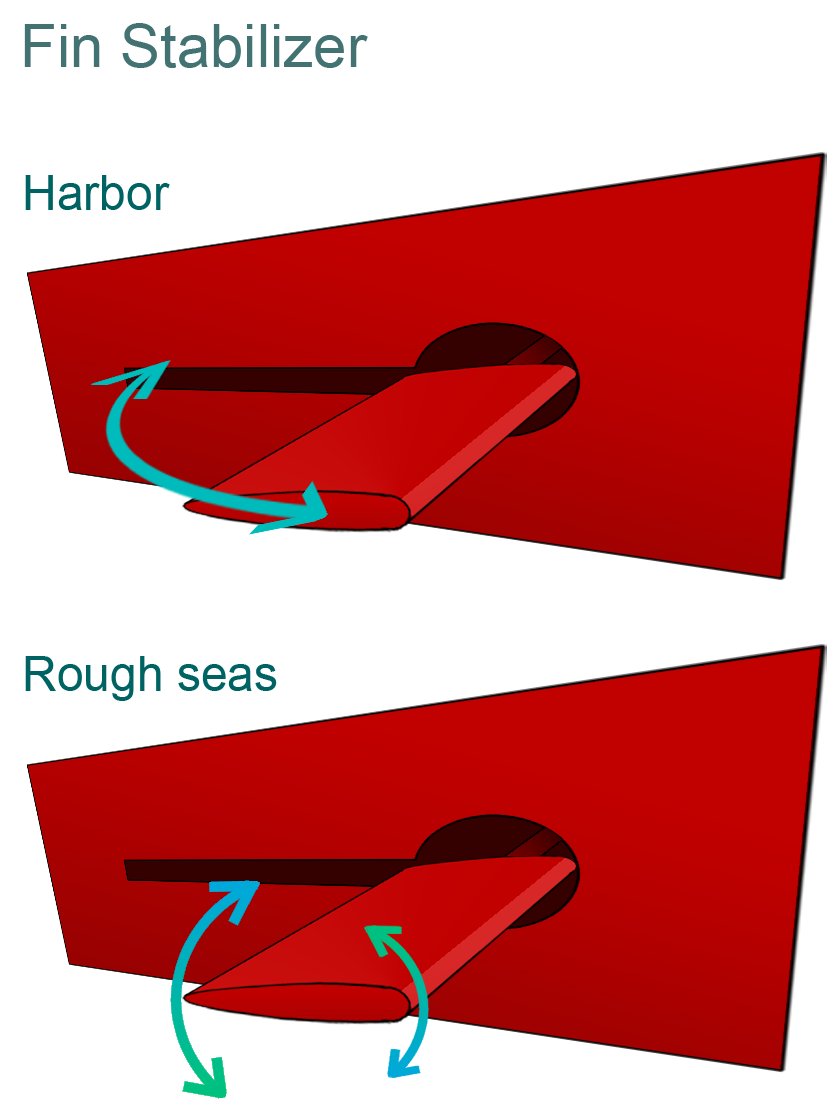
Diagram of retractable fin stabilizers on a ship.

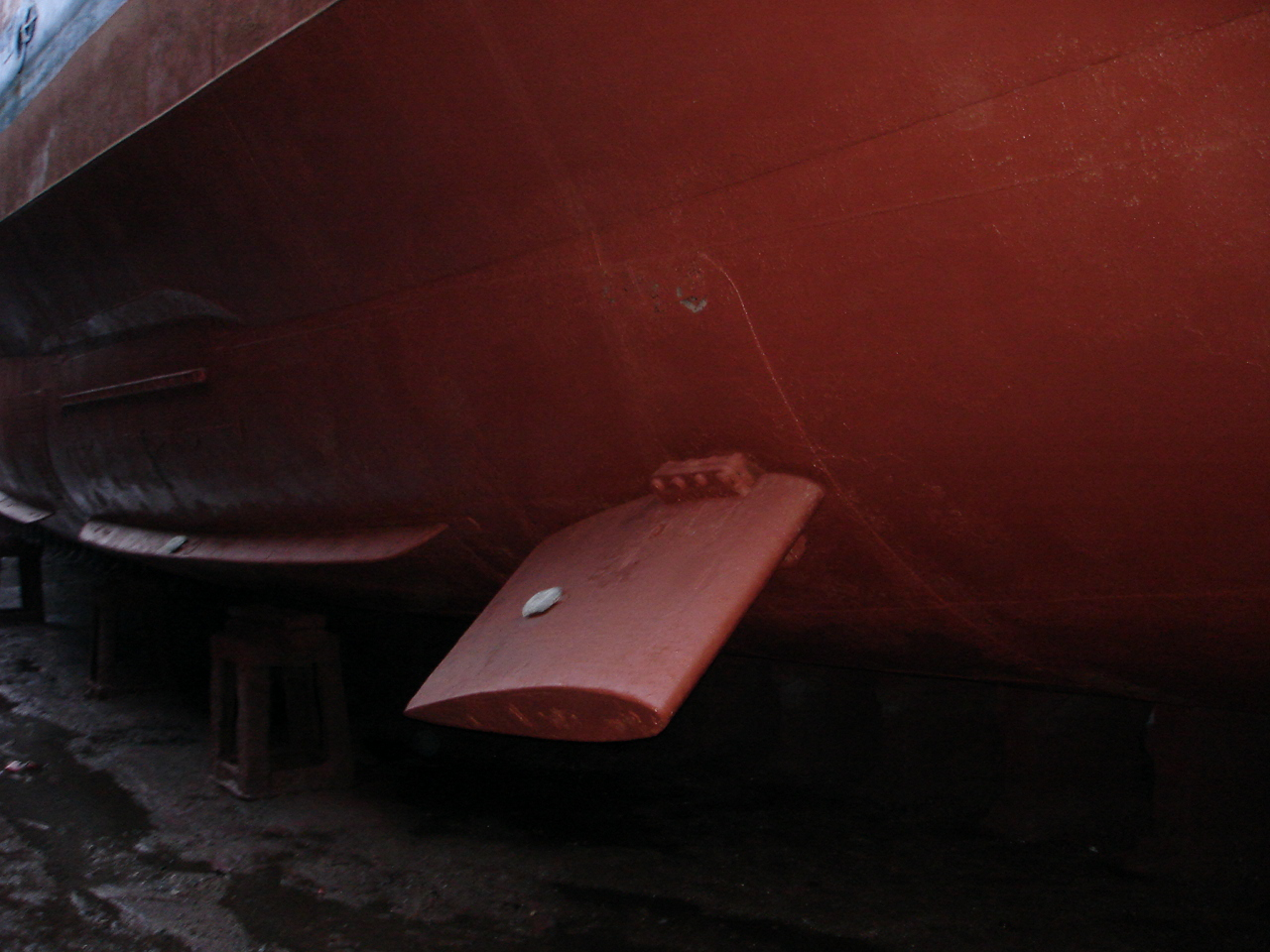
Ship stabilizers: a fixed fin stabilizer (foreground centre) and bilge keels (left background).

Ship stabilizers (or stabilisers) are fins or rotors mounted beneath the waterline and emerging laterally from the hull to reduce a ship's roll due to wind or waves. Active fins are controlled by a gyroscopic control system. When the gyroscope senses the ship roll, it changes the fins' angle of attack so that the forward motion of the ship exerts force to counteract the roll. Fixed fins and bilge keels do not move; they reduce roll by hydrodynamic drag exerted when the ship rolls. Stabilizers are mostly used on ocean-going ships.

== Function ==
Fins work by producing lift or downforce when the vessel is in motion. The lift produced by the fins should work against the roll moment of the vessel. To accomplish this, two wings, each installed underwater on either side of the ship, are used. Stabilizers can be:

- Retractable - All medium and large cruise and ferry ships have the ability to retract the fins into a space inside the hull in order to avoid extra fuel consumption and reduce the required hull clearance when the fins are not needed
- Non-retractable - Used on small vessels such as yachts.

Stabilizer movement is similar to that of aircraft ailerons. Some types of fins, especially the ones installed on larger ships, are provided with flaps, that increase the fin lift by about 15%. Stabilizer control needs to consider numerous variables that change quickly: wind, waves, ship motion, draft, etc. Fin stabilizers are much more efficient at higher velocities and lose effectiveness when the ship is under a minimum speed. Stabilization solutions at anchor or at low speed include actively controlled fins (such as the stabilisation at rest system developed by Rolls-Royce that oscillate to counteract wave motion), and rotary cylinders employing the Magnus effect. The latter two systems are retractable, allowing for a thinner vessel profile when docking and reducing drag while cruising.

== History ==
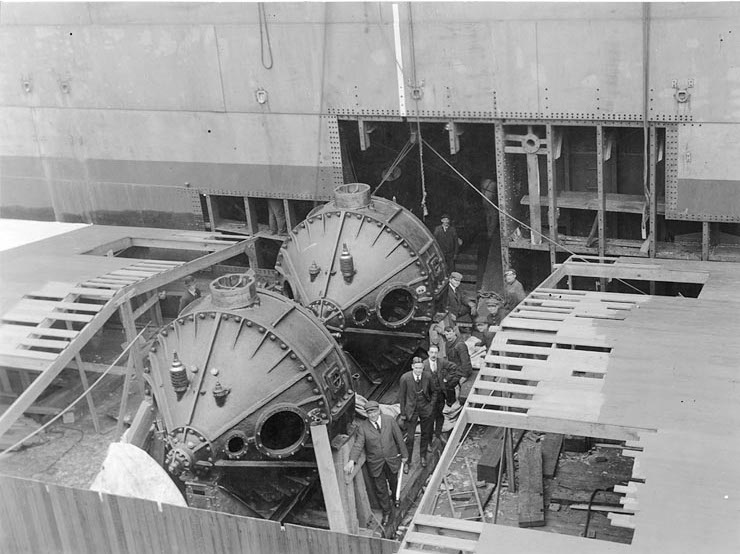
Two 25-ton roll-stabilizing gyroscopes are installed on the transport USS Henderson during construction in 1917. It was the first large ship to use gyroscopic stabilization.

Naval architect Reuven Leopold writes that modern naval stabilization engineering started with antiroll tanks installed on British warships in the end of 19th century. Another early stabilization technology was the anti-rolling gyro, or gyroscopic stabilization. In 1915 the gyroscopic stabilizer was mounted on US destroyer USS Worden (DD-16). The World War I transport USS Henderson, completed in 1917, was the first large ship with gyro stabilizers. It had two 25-ton (23 t), 9-foot (2.7 m) diameter flywheels mounted near the center of the ship, spun at 1100 RPM by 75 HP AC motors. The gyroscopes' cases were mounted on vertical bearings. When a small sensor gyroscope on the bridge sensed a roll, a servomotor would rotate the gyros about a vertical axis in a direction so their precession would counteract the roll. In tests this system was able to reduce roll to 3 degrees in the roughest seas. For about 20 years the effectiveness of the stabilizers was unclear (in part due to improved gunfire directors), and in the US Navy the feature remained experimental (gyrostabilizer on the USS Osborne (DD-295), active-tank stabilizer on USS Hamilton (DMS-18)) until 1950s. One of the most famous ships to first use an anti-rolling gyro was the Italian passenger liner SS Conte di Savoia, which first sailed in November 1932. It had three flywheels which were 13 feet (4.0 m) in diameter and weighed about 100 tons (91 tonnes) . Gyroscope stabilization was replaced by fin stabilization due to its lower weight and bulk, but it has seen renewed interest since the 1990s (Seakeeper, etc.).

The fin stabilizer had been patented by Motora Shintaro affiliated with Mitsubishi Shipbuilding (now a subsidiary of Mitsubishi Heavy Industries) of Japan in 1922. The first use of fin stabilizers on a ship was by a Japanese cruise liner in 1933. From the late 1930s the British were actively installing the Denny-Brown fin stabilizers onto their warships (over 100 installations by 1950). US Navy continued unsuccessful experiments with roll tanks until the successful fin stabilizer installations onto USS Gyatt (1956) and USS Bronstein (DE-1037) (1958).

In 1934 a Dutch liner introduced one of the world's most unusual ship stabilizer systems, in which two large tubes were mounted on each side of the ship's hull with the bottom of the tubes open to the sea. The top of the tubes had compressed air or steam pumped in. As the ship rolled, the side it was rolling to would fill with water and then compressed air or steam would be injected to push the water down, countering the roll.

In 2018, rocket and space technology company Blue Origin purchased the Stena Freighter, a roll-on/roll-off cargo ship, for use as a landing platform ship for its New Glenn launch vehicle booster stages. As of late 2018, the ship is undergoing refit to prepare for its role of landing rockets. The rocket boosters will be recovered downrange of the launch site in the Atlantic Ocean while the hydrodynamically-stabilized ship is underway. The ship stabilization technology is designed to increase the likelihood of successful rocket recovery in rough seas, as well as helping to carry out launches on schedule.

== See also ==
- Ship stability
- Stabilization while not under way

== Sources ==
- Kerchove, René de baron (1961). "Denny-Brown Stabilizer". International Maritime Dictionary: An Encyclopedic Dictionary of Useful Maritime Terms and Phrases, Together with Equivalents in French and German (2 ed.). Van Nostrand Reinhold. p. 213. ISBN 978-0-442-02062-0. OCLC 1039382382.
- Leopold, Reuven (December 1977). "Innovation adoption in naval ship design". Naval Engineers Journal. 89 (6): 35–42. Bibcode:1977NEngJ..89...35L. doi:10.1111/j.1559-3584.1977.tb05537.x. eISSN 1559-3584. hdl:1721.1/16291. ISSN 0028-1425.
