= Eminence (yacht) =

Super-yacht, built in 2008

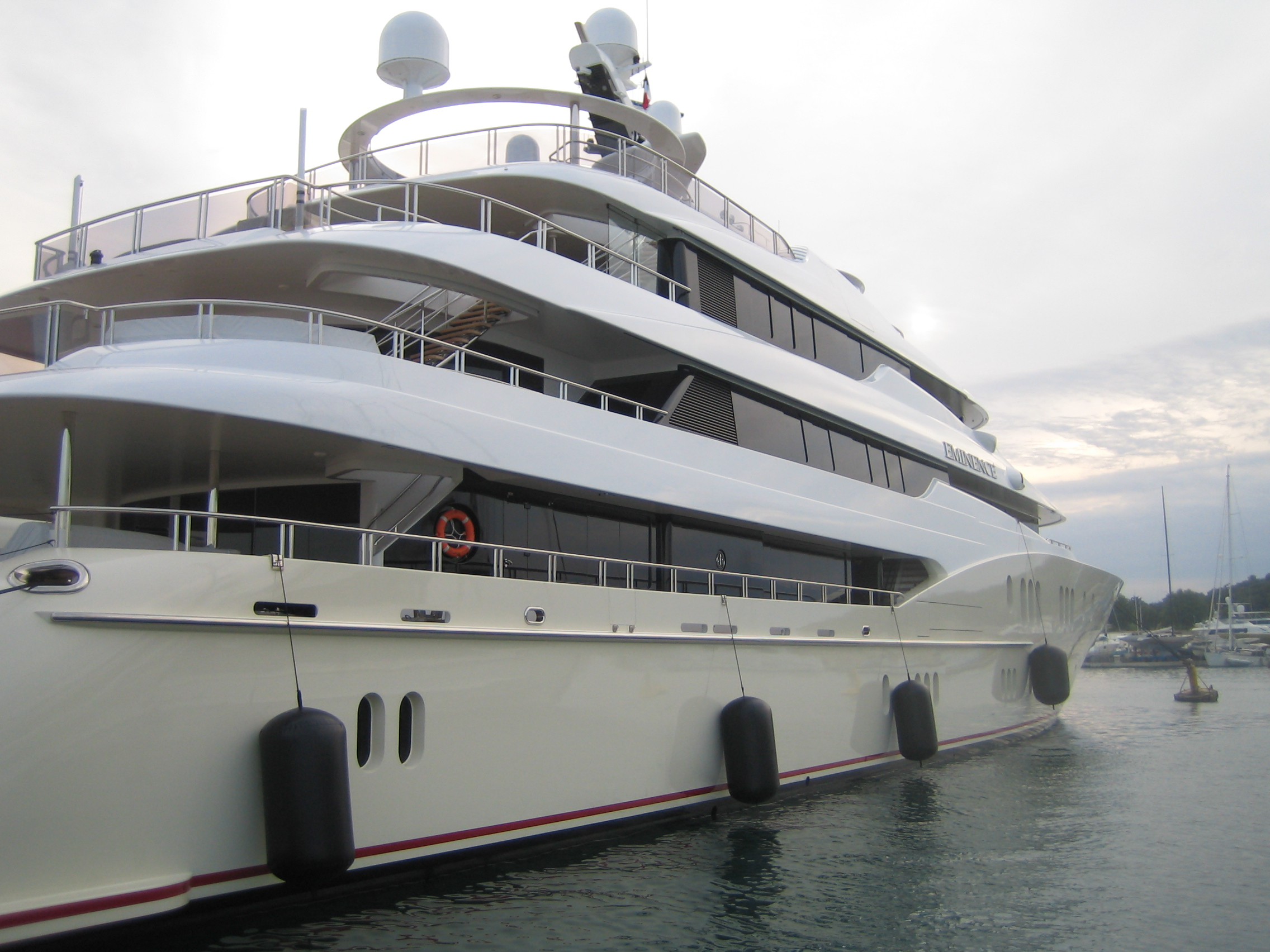

History

Cayman Islands
- Name: Eminence
- Owner: Haim Saban
- Builder: Abeking & Rasmussen
- Yard number: 6478
- Launched: 2008
- Identification: IMO number: 1009481; MMSI number: 319863000; Callsign: ZCXP5

General characteristics
- Class & type: Motor yacht
- Tonnage: 2,054 gross tons
- Length: 78.43 m (257.3 ft)
- Beam: 12.40 m (40.7 ft)
- Draught: 3.20 m (10.5 ft)
- Propulsion: 2 × Caterpillar Inc. 3516 DITA; 2 × 2.000 hp (1.491 kW)
- Speed: 16 knots (30 km/h) (maximum); 14 knots (26 km/h) (cruising)
- Capacity: 16 passengers
- Crew: 24 crew members

Eminence is a super-yacht built in 2008 at the shipyard Abeking & Rasmussen. The interior and exterior design of Eminence was done by Reymond Langton Design Ltd. She can carry 12 guests in 8 cabins. The yacht has two sister-ships, Amaryllis and Titan.

== Design ==
The length of the yacht is 78.43 m (257.3 ft), and she has a beam of 12.40 m (40.7 ft). Her draught is 3.20 m (10.5 ft). The hull is steel, and the superstructure is aluminium. The yacht is Lloyd's registered, issued by the Cayman Islands.

== Engines ==
The main power-plant of the yacht is composed of two Caterpillar Inc. 3516 DITA with a power of 2.000 hp (1.491 kW) each. She can reach a maximum speed of 16 knots (30 km/h), while she cruises at 14 knots (26 km/h).

== See also ==
- Amaryllis
- Titan
- Motor yacht
- List of motor yachts by length
- List of yachts built by Abeking & Rasmussen
