= Amaryllis (yacht) =

Yacht

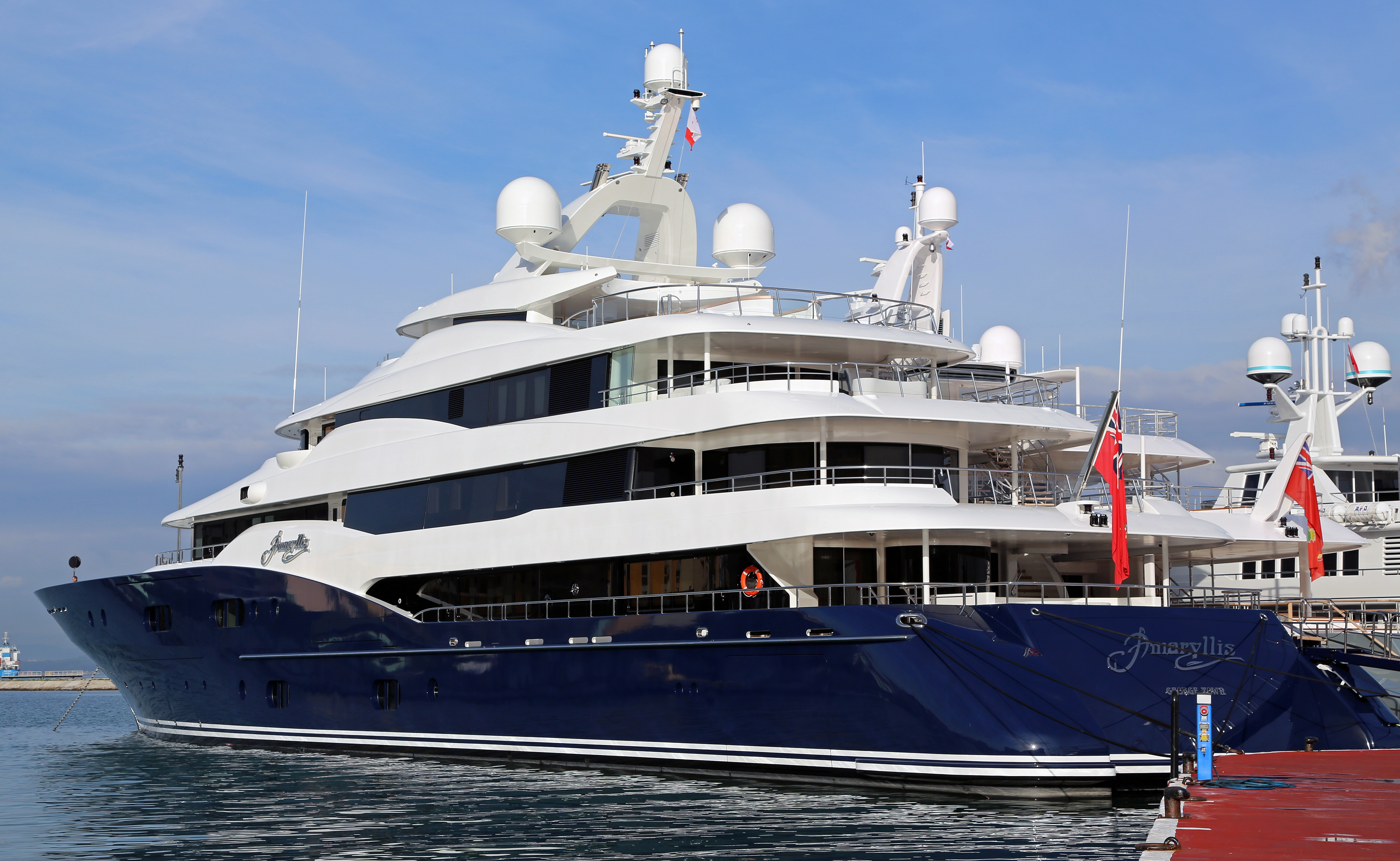

History

Cayman Islands
- Name: Amaryllis
- Builder: Abeking & Rasmussen
- Yard number: 6492
- Launched: 2011
- Identification: IMO number: 1010519; MMSI number: 319036400; Callsign: ZGBH7

General characteristics
- Class & type: Motor yacht
- Tonnage: 2,050 gross tons
- Length: 78.43 m (257.3 ft)
- Beam: 12.40 m (40.7 ft)
- Draught: 3.20 m (10.5 ft)
- Propulsion: 2 × Caterpillar Inc. 3516 DITA; 2 × 2,000 hp (1,500 kW)
- Speed: 16 knots (30 km/h) (maximum); 14 knots (26 km/h) (cruising)
- Capacity: 14 passengers
- Crew: 19 crew members

Amaryllis is a super-yacht built in 2011 at the shipyard Abeking & Rasmussen. The interior and exterior design of Amaryllis was done by Reymond Langton Design Ltd. The yacht has two sister ships, Eminence and Titan.

== Design ==
The length of the yacht is 78.43 m (257.3 ft) and the beam is 12.40 m (40.7 ft). The draught of Amaryllis is 3.20 m (10.5 ft). The materials of the hull is steel, with the superstructure made out of aluminium. The yacht is Lloyd's registered, issued by Cayman Islands.

The boat can accommodate 14 guests and 19 crew members.

== Engines ==
The main engines are two Caterpillar Inc. 3516 DITA with a power of 2,000 hp (1,500 kW) each. The yacht Amaryllis can reach a maximum speed of 16 knots (30 km/h), while the cruising speed is 14 knots (26 km/h).

== See also ==
- Eminence
- Titan
- Motor yacht
- List of motor yachts by length
- List of yachts built by Abeking & Rasmussen
