= Elysian (yacht) =

Cayman Islands yacht

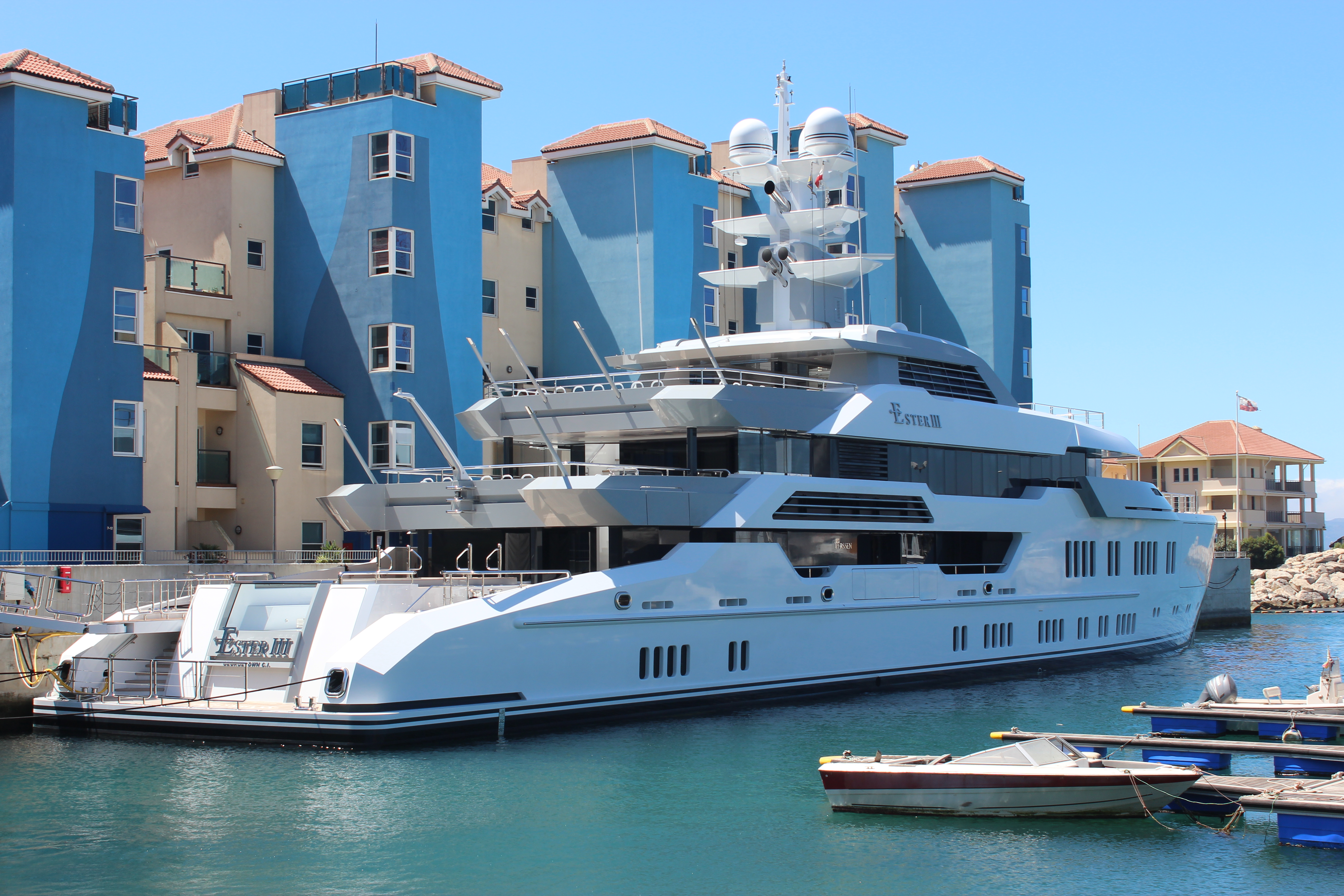
- Elysian under a previous name, in Queensway Quay Marina, Gibraltar in 2016

History

Cayman Islands
- Name: Elysian
- Owner: John W. Henry
- Builder: Lürssen
- Launched: 2014
- In service: 2014
- Identification: IMO number: 1012189; MMSI number: 319072300; Callsign: ZGED3

General characteristics
- Class & type: Motor yacht
- Tonnage: 1527 gross tons
- Length: 66 m (217 ft)
- Beam: 11.90 m (39.0 ft)
- Draught: 3.40 m (11.2 ft)
- Propulsion: Twin 2011hp MTU 12V4000M63 diesel engines
- Speed: 17 knots (31 km/h)
- Capacity: 12 guests
- Crew: 17
- Notes: Previous names: Iroquois, Ester III

The 66 m (217 ft) superyacht Elysian was launched by Lürssen at their Rendsburg shipyard. The yacht's exterior is the design work of Espen Øino. Reymond Langton Design was selected by the owner to create the custom interior.

== Design ==
Her length is 66 m (217 ft), beam is 11.90 m (39.0 ft) and she has a draught of 3.40 m (11.2 ft). The hull is built out of steel while the superstructure is made out of aluminium with teak laid decks. The yacht is Lloyd's registered, issued by Cayman Islands.

== Engines ==
Elysian is powered by twin MTU 12V4000M63 diesel engines, with a total power output 4022 hp.

== See also ==
- List of motor yachts by length
- List of yachts built by Lürssen
