= Shahid Khan =

Pakistani and American businessman (born 1950)

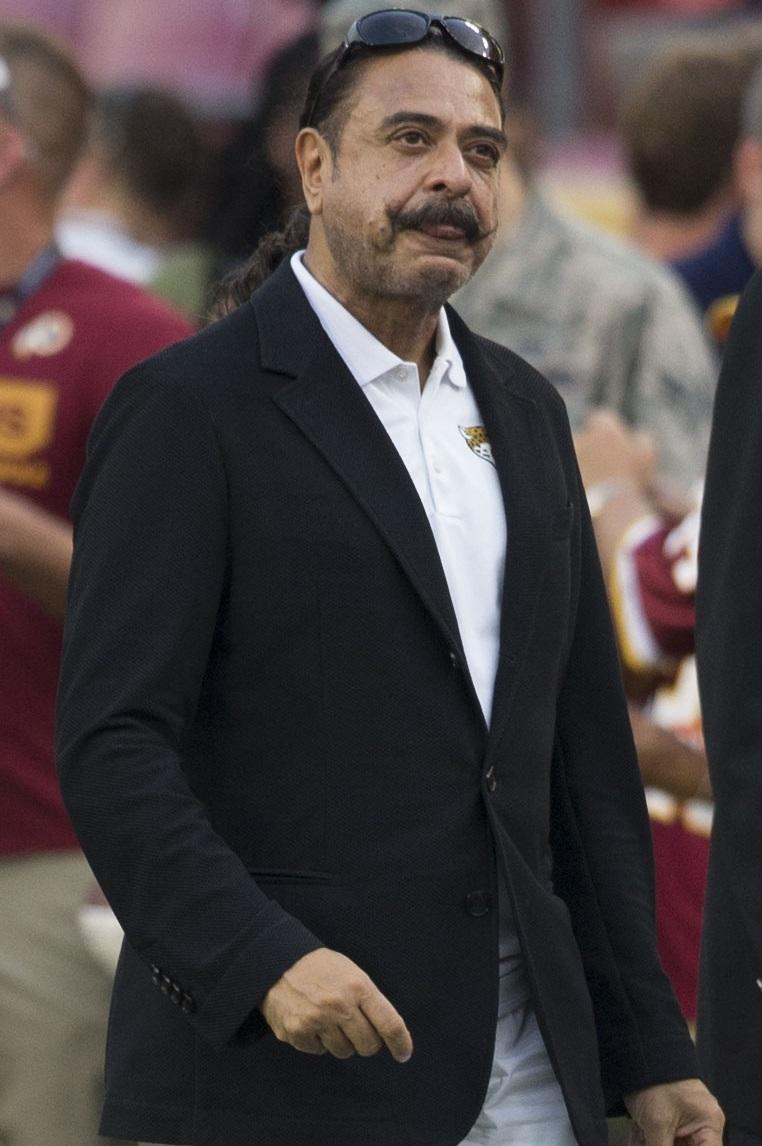
- Khan in 2015
- Born: Shahid Rafiq Khan; July 18, 1950 (age 76); Lahore, Punjab, Pakistan
- Citizenship: Pakistan; United States (since 1991)
- Education: University of Illinois at Urbana–Champaign (BS)
- Occupation: Businessman
- Years active: 1978–present
- Known for: Principal owner of the Jacksonville Jaguars and Fulham F.C.; Owner of Flex-N-Gate; Co-owner of All Elite Wrestling
- Spouse: Ann Carlson (m. 1977)
- Children: 2, including Tony
- Football career

Jacksonville Jaguars
- Title: Owner

Career information
- College: Illinois

Career history
- Jacksonville Jaguars (2012–present) Owner

Shahid Rafiq Khan (Note: Urdu: شاہد خان) (born July 18, 1950) is a Pakistani American businessman. He owns the Jacksonville Jaguars of the National Football League (NFL) and Fulham F.C. of the Premier League and is also a lead investor of the American wrestling promotion All Elite Wrestling (AEW), owned by his son, Tony. Khan is also the owner of Flex-N-Gate, an American supplier of motor vehicle components.

Khan appeared on the front cover of Forbes magazine in 2012, associating him as the face of the American Dream. As of January 2025, Khan's estimated net worth is $13.3 billion. In 2024, he ranked 55th in the Forbes 400 list of richest Americans, 167th richest in the world, and the richest auto parts magnate.

== Early life ==
Shahid Rafiq Khan was born on July 18, 1950 in Lahore, Punjab, Pakistan, to a middle-class Punjabi Muslim family involved in the construction industry. His father, Rafiq Khan, owned a shop that sold survey and drawing equipment, while his mother Zakia Khan was a professor of mathematics. Shahid Khan also has a younger brother named Faran Khan, a local businessman in Pakistan.

Khan moved to the United States in 1967 at age 16 to study at the University of Illinois at Urbana–Champaign. When he went to the United States, Khan spent his first night in a $2/night room at the university Young Men's Christian Association, and his first job was washing dishes for $1.20 an hour. Khan joined the Beta Theta Pi fraternity at the school and graduated from the Grainger College of Engineering with a BSc in industrial engineering in 1971. He was later awarded the Mechanical Science and Engineering Distinguished Alumni Award in 1999.

== Business career ==
=== Flex-N-Gate ===
Khan worked at the automotive manufacturing company Flex-N-Gate Corporation while attending the University of Illinois. When he graduated, Khan was hired as the engineering director for the company. In 1978, he started Bumper Works, which made car bumpers for customized pickup trucks and body shop repairs. The funds to start the new business included a $50,000 loan from the Small Business Administration and $16,000 of his own savings.

In 1980, Khan bought Flex-N-Gate from his former employer Charles Gleason Butzow, bringing Bumper Works into the fold. The company grew under him, so that it supplied bumpers for the Big Three automakers. In 1984, Khan began supplying a small number of bumpers for Toyota pickups. By 1987, it was the sole supplier for Toyota pickups, and by 1989, it was the sole supplier for the entire Toyota line in the United States. Adopting the Toyota Way increased company efficiency and ability to change its manufacturing process within a few minutes. Since then, the company has grown from $17 million in sales to an estimated $2 billion in 2010 to $8.89 billion in 2020. Its operation in Sandusky, Ohio is one of the largest automotive light manufacturing plants in the United States.

By 2019, Flex-N-Gate had 25,000 employees and 69 manufacturing plants in the United States, China, Argentina, Spain, France, Germany, Mexico and Canada. In 2020, it had a revenue of $8.9 billion and was ranked as the 46th largest privately held American company by Forbes. It is also ranked by Automotive News as the seventh largest American automotive parts supplier and overall 33rd largest supplier in the world.

== Sport and entertainment ==
=== Jacksonville Jaguars ===
Khan's first attempt to purchase a National Football League team came on February 11, 2010, when he entered into an agreement to acquire 60% of the then-St. Louis Rams from Chip Rosenbloom and Lucia Rodriguez, subject to approval by other NFL owners. However, Stan Kroenke, the minority shareholder of the Rams, ultimately exercised a clause in his ownership agreement to match any proposed bid.

On November 29, 2011, Khan agreed to purchase the Jacksonville Jaguars from Wayne Weaver and his ownership group subject to NFL approval. Weaver announced his sale of the team to Khan later that same day. The terms of the deal were not immediately disclosed, other than a verbal commitment to keep the team in Jacksonville, Florida. The purchase price was $770 million. The NFL owners unanimously approved the purchase on December 14, 2011. The sale was finalized on January 4, 2012, making Khan the first member of an ethnic minority to own an NFL team.

Khan is a board member of the NFL Foundation. He is one of three NFL team owners born outside of the United States, the other two being Kim Pegula of the Buffalo Bills, born in South Korea, and Zygi Wilf of the Minnesota Vikings, born in Germany.

=== Fulham F.C. ===
In July 2013, Khan negotiated the purchase of the London soccer club Fulham F.C. of the Premier League from its previous owner, Mohamed Al-Fayed. The deal was finalized on July 12, 2013, with the amount estimated between £150–200 million. An official purchase price for the club was not announced with him stating that it was "highly confidential".

=== All Elite Wrestling ===
In 2019, it was revealed that Shahid Khan and his son, Tony Khan, are the lead investors behind the professional wrestling promotion All Elite Wrestling (AEW). Tony Khan is also the president and CEO of the promotion.

On April 24, 2024, Khan made his on-screen debut, coming out to the ring after his son was attacked (as part of a story angle) by Jack Perry and The Young Bucks.

=== Black News Channel ===
Khan was the majority shareholder in Black News Channel throughout the network's two-year existence.

== Personal life ==
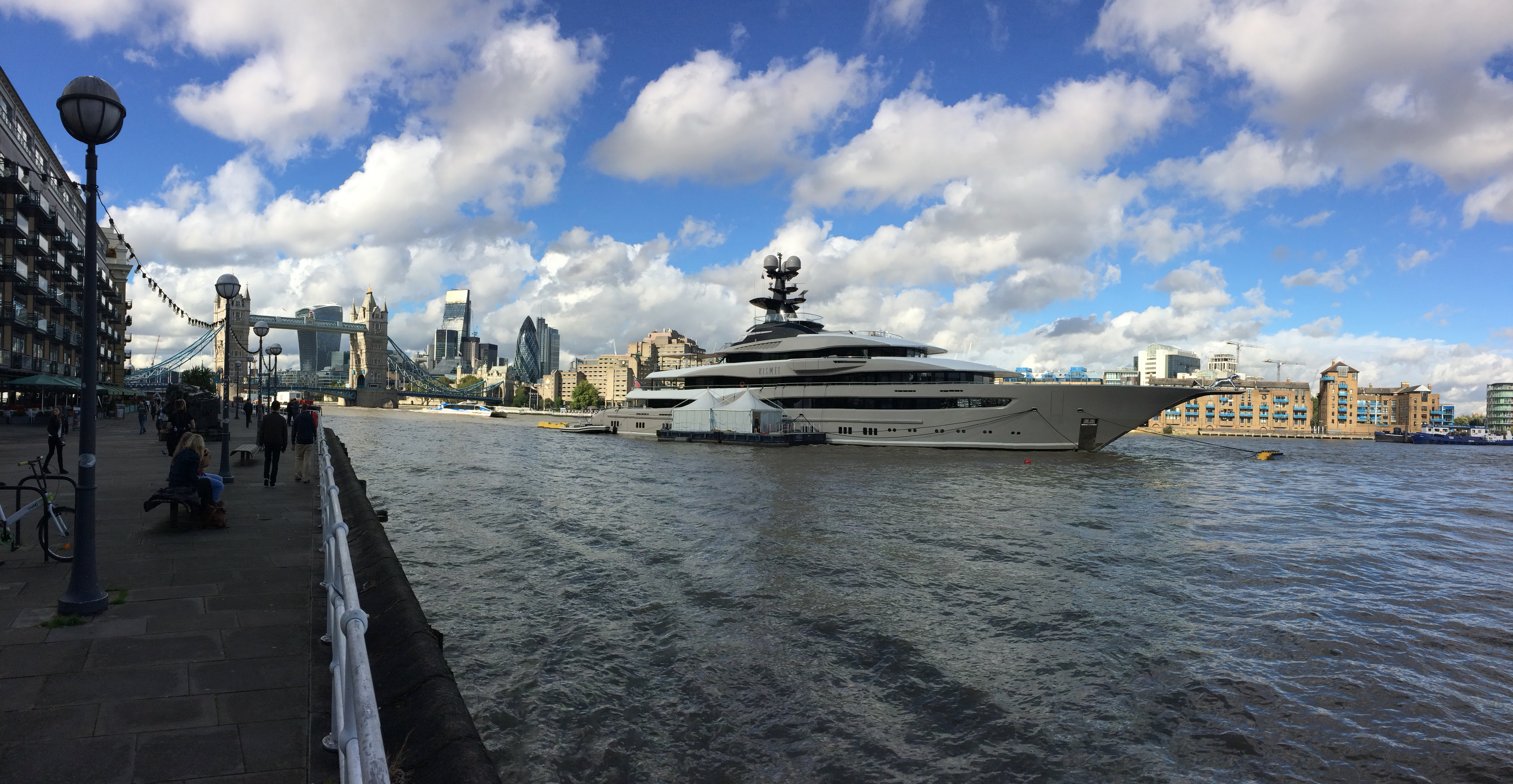
Khan's yacht moored by Tower Bridge, London while the Jacksonville Jaguars were visiting for an NFL International Series game (October 2016).

Khan is a cultural Muslim. Khan met Ann Carlson (now Ann Carlson Khan) at the University of Illinois in 1967 and dated her for ten years before they married in 1977. They have two children together, a daughter named Shanna and a son, Tony. Khan became a naturalized American citizen in 1991.

Khan owns a house in Naples, Florida, and an apartment in Chicago's Gold Coast neighborhood. He owned the superyacht Kismet until he sold it to Eric Schmidt in September 2023, who renamed it to Whisper. Khan built a new, larger superyacht in 2024 with the same Kismet name.

=== Political views ===
In 2016, Khan supported the Republican Party and Donald Trump's presidential campaign. He was among the NFL team owners who donated to Trump for his inauguration fund. However, in 2017, Khan was critical of the Trump administration's "Muslim immigration ban". Nevertheless, he later voiced support for Trump's economic policies while reassuring his opposition to Trump's social policies.

In July 2019, Khan met Pakistani prime minister Imran Khan and stated that he is "the best thing that’s happened to Pakistan".

== Awards and honors ==
Khan has received a number of awards from the University of Illinois, including a Distinguished Alumnus Award in 1999 from the Department of Mechanical Science and Industrial Engineering, the Alumni Award for Distinguished Service in 2006 from the College of Engineering, and (with his wife, Ann Carlson) the Distinguished Service Award in 2005 from the University of Illinois Alumni Association. In 2025, Khan received a Great Immigrant Award from the Carnegie Corporation of New York.
