= HBC (yacht) =

Motor yacht built in 2008

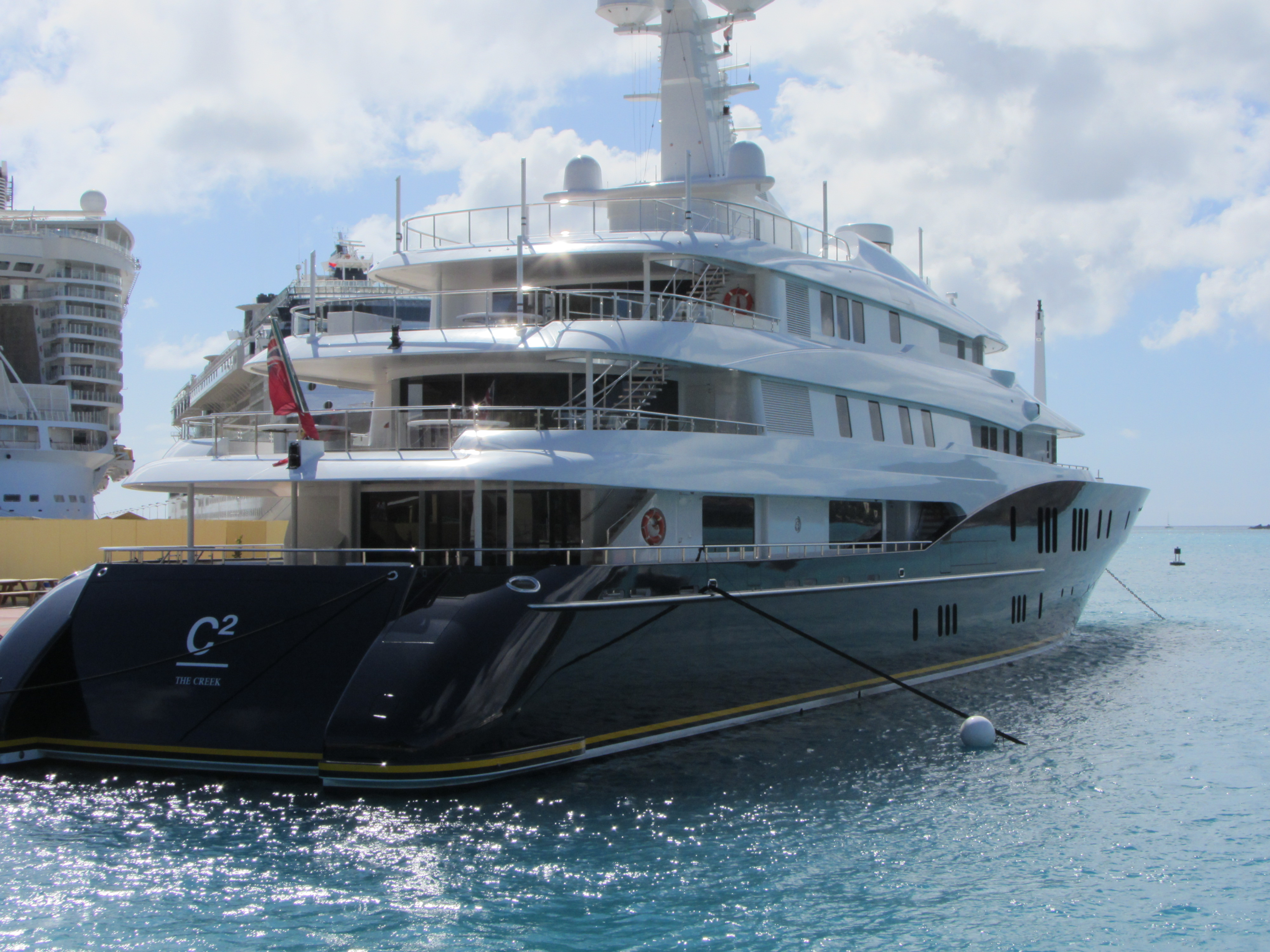
- C2 in 2012

History

Cayman Islands
- Name: HBC
- Builder: Abeking & Rasmussen
- Yard number: 6479
- Launched: 2008
- Identification: IMO number: 1009833; MMSI number: 319268000; Callsign: ZCYD3

General characteristics
- Type: Superyacht
- Tonnage: 2,075 GT
- Length: 85.62 m (280 ft 11 in)
- Beam: 12.40 m (40 ft 8 in)
- Draught: 3.20 m (10 ft 6 in)
- Propulsion: 2 × Caterpillar Inc. 3516 DITA; 2 × 2,000 hp (1,491 kW)
- Speed: 16 knots (30 km/h) (maximum); 14 knots (26 km/h) (cruising)
- Capacity: 14 passengers
- Crew: 19 crew members

HBC, formerly known as C2 and then B2, is a superyacht built in 2008 at the shipyard Abeking & Rasmussen. The interior and exterior design of HBC were done by Reymond Langton Design Ltd.

== Design ==
The length of the yacht is 85.62 m (280 ft 11 in) and the beam is 12.40 m (40 ft 8 in). The draught of HBC is 3.20 m (10 ft 6 in). The material of the hull is steel, and the superstructure is made out of aluminium. The yacht is Lloyd's registered, issued by Cayman Islands. The yacht can accommodate up to 22 passengers.

== Engines ==
The main engines are two Caterpillar Inc. 3516 DITA with a power of 2,000 hp (1,491 kW) each. The yacht HBC can reach a maximum speed of 16 knots (30 km/h), while the cruising speed is 14 knots (26 km/h).

== See also ==
- Motor yacht
- List of motor yachts by length
- List of yachts built by Abeking & Rasmussen
