= Reymond Langton Design =

British yacht design studio

Reymond Langton Design Ltd
- Industry: Design
- Founded: 2001
- Headquarters: Bath, Somerset, UK
- Key people: Pascale Reymond; Andrew Langton; Jason Macaree
- Website: www.reymondlangtondesign.com

Reymond Langton Design is a design studio specialising in the interior decoration of superyachts. It was founded by Pascale Reymond and Andrew Langton in 2001, and was originally based in London. The company headquarters and principal design studio subsequently relocated to the city of Bath.

Reymond Langton Design has been involved in the interior decoration of a number of motor and sail yachts, including:

- Aviva (2007)
- C2 (2008)
- Eminence (2008)
- Titan (2010)
- Amaryllis (2011)
- Serene (2011)
- Elysian (2014)
- Kismet (2014)
- Lady Lara (2015)
- Aviva (2017)
