= Aviva (68m yacht) =

Motor yacht, built 2007

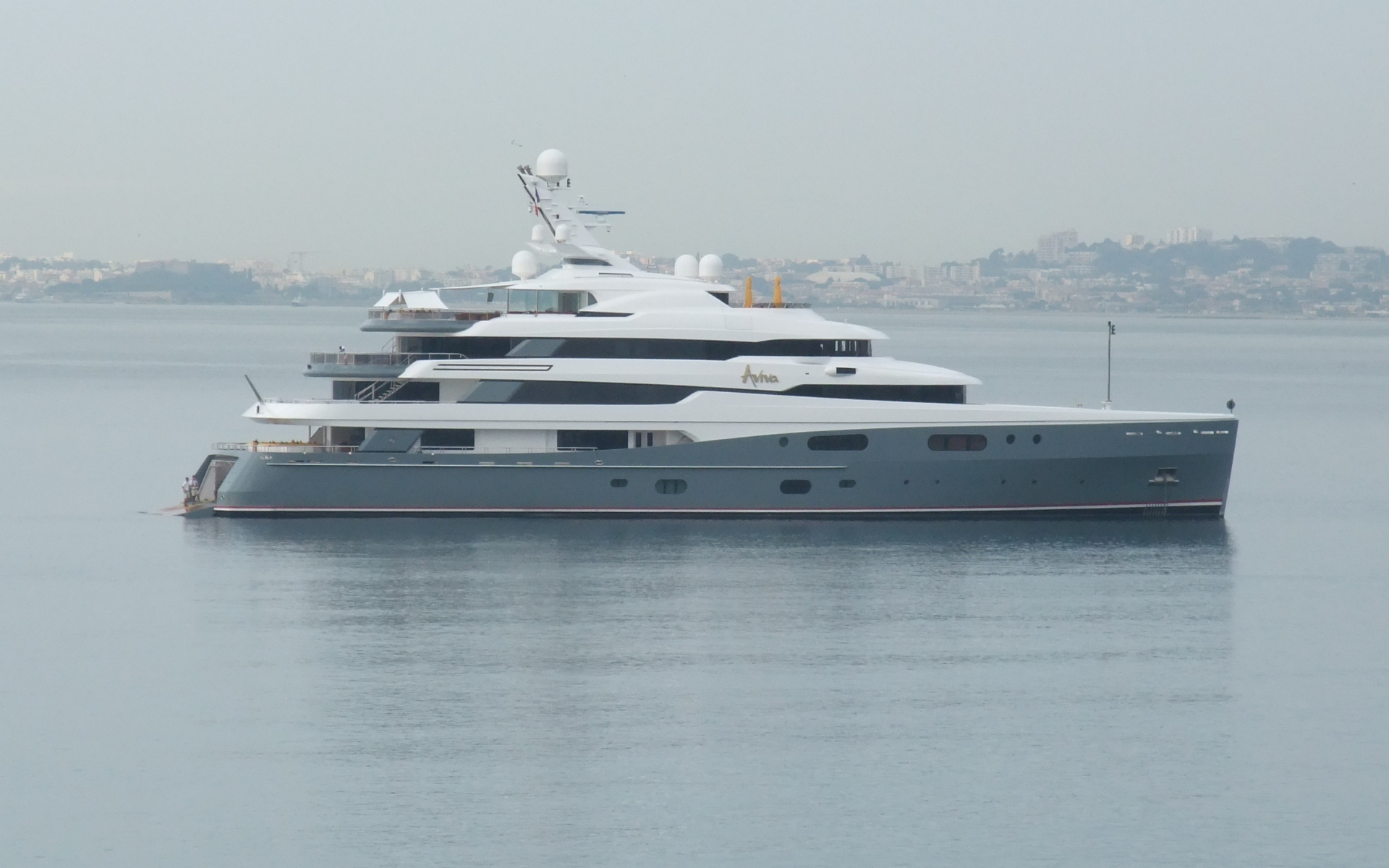

History
- Name: Aviva
- Owner: Joe Lewis
- Port of registry: Cayman Islands
- Builder: Abeking & Rasmussen
- Completed: 2007
- Identification: IMO number: 1009053; MMSI number: 319763000; Callsign: ZCPZ6

General characteristics
- Class & type: Motor yacht
- Length: 68 metres (223 ft)
- Capacity: 16 guests
- Notes: Third yacht built for Lewis called Aviva, this is Aviva III

Aviva is a 68 metres (223 ft) length motor yacht. Drafted as Aviva III, it is the third super yacht named Aviva built for Bahamas-based British businessman Joe Lewis. Launched in 2007 by Lemwerder-based German builder Abeking & Rasmussen, they undertook the overall design and interior details, while Reymond Langton were responsible for external styling.

Aviva acts as Lewis's personal mobile office, housing his personal art collection, Lewis has been known to live on Aviva for months at a time. Capable of housing up to 16 guests, the yacht has been refitted on at least two occasions since her 2007 launch.

In 2017, the same yard completed a new Aviva for Lewis, with a hull length of 98 metres.

== See also ==
- List of motor yachts by length
- Super yacht
