= Aviva (98m yacht) =

Motor yacht launched in 2017

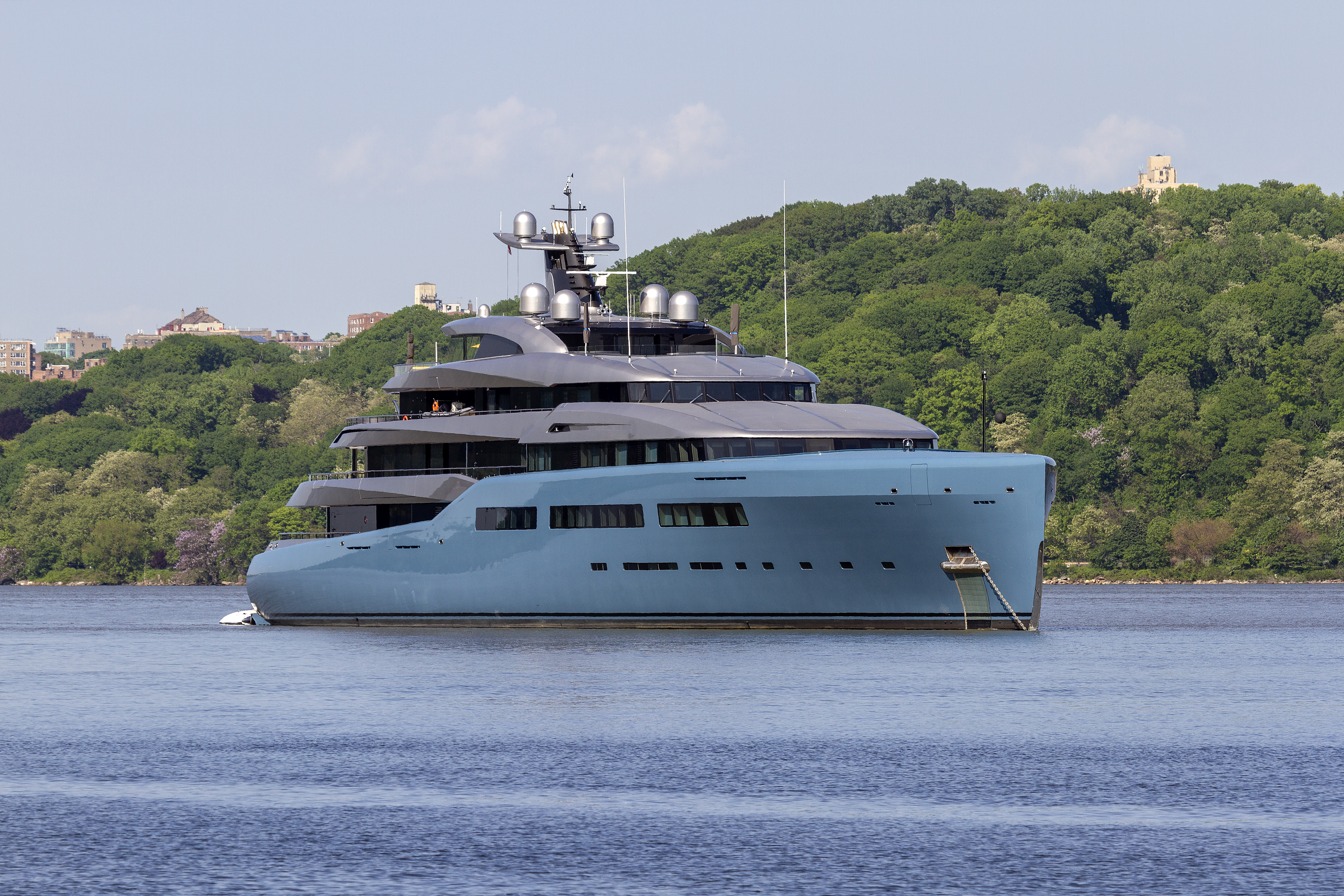
- Aviva anchored in the Hudson River

History
- Name: Aviva
- Owner: Joe Lewis
- Port of registry: Cayman Islands
- Builder: Abeking & Rasmussen; Flensburger Schiffbau-Gesellschaft
- Yard number: 6501
- Launched: 2015
- Completed: 2017
- Identification: IMO number: 1012957; MMSI number: 319111300

General characteristics
- Class & type: Motor yacht
- Length: 98 metres (322 ft)
- Notes: Fourth yacht built for Lewis named Aviva

Aviva is a 98-metre (322 ft) length motor yacht. She is the fourth yacht named Aviva built for Bahamas-based British businessman Joe Lewis, and replaces the 68m Aviva (III). Like her predecessor, Aviva was designed by Reymond Langton, and built by Lemwerder-based German builder Abeking & Rasmussen. The hull of the ship was built at Flensburger Schiffbau-Gesellschaft and launched in 2015.

She was launched in 2017, has the IMO Number 1012957, and the MMSI Number 319111300.

Aviva acts as Lewis's floating home and office, and features an indoor, full-sized padel tennis court.

== See also ==
- List of motor yachts by length
