= Stabilization while not underway =

Reducing an anchored/moored watercraft's rolling motion

Stabilisation while not underway, stabilisation at rest, zero-speed stabilisation or on-anchor stabilisation is the process of augmenting roll reduction for a vessel that is not underway. This process may in some cases be implemented through the use of equipment systems that are also used for roll stabilisation while underway.

Vessels at anchor, at moorings, adrift, or keeping station are subjected to roll and pitch generating forces similar to those that affect vessels underway. Different strategies for mitigating the effects of these forces have been adopted.

A variable system that uses "active fins" designed specifically for roll attenuation of a vessel while underway achieves lifting force through the flow of water over the fin's surface. By increasing the angle of attack of the fin to the water flow to some maximum working angle, a maximum lift force can be achieved for stabilising the hull. When these same systems are used for roll stabilisation of stationary vessels, the lift force available from water flow over the fin while underway is not available. For a stationary vessel, the ability to generate a lifting force (i.e. roll-resisting force) is limited to that achieved by any powered fin movements, and by the water volume displaced while stroking the fins in one direction at a precise point in time. Active fin systems can provide incremental add-on stability for vessels at rest, but these systems will usually have larger actuators and fins, and will likely have special power source requirements in comparison to systems designed for stability underway.

Zero Speed stabilisation was first introduced by Quantum Marine Stabilizers in the year 2000. Since then, various commercial suppliers produce a range of stabilization systems that can be used at rest, on-anchor, or at zero-speed.

== See also ==
- Anti-rolling gyro
