= USS Henderson (AP-1) =

US Navy transport ship in service 1917-1946

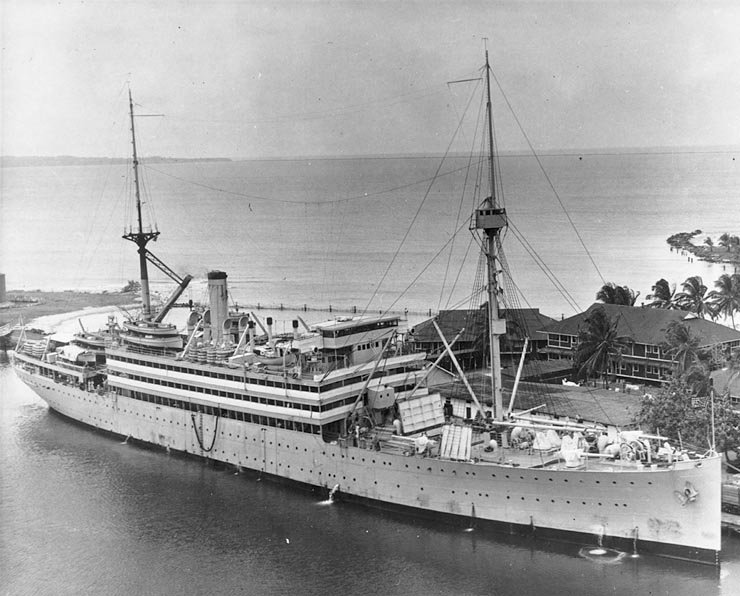
- USS Henderson (AP-1) at Coco Solo, Panama Canal Zone, 6 January 1933

History

United States
- Name: USS Henderson (AP-1)
- Namesake: Colonel Archibald Henderson, U.S. Marine Corps
- Builder: Philadelphia Navy Yard
- Laid down: 19 June 1915
- Launched: 17 June 1916
- Sponsored by: Miss Genevieve W. Taylor, great-granddaughter of General Henderson
- Commissioned: 24 May 1917
- Decommissioned: 13 October 1943
- Recommissioned: 23 March 1944, as Bountiful (AH-9)
- Decommissioned: 13 September 1946
- Renamed: USS Bountiful (AH-9), 1944
- Reclassified: AP-1 to AH-9, 23 March 1944
- Honors and awards: 4 battle stars for World War II service
- Fate: Sold for scrap, 28 January 1948

General characteristics
- Displacement: 7,730 long tons (7,854 t) light; 12,400 long tons (12,599 t) full
- Length: 483 ft 10 in (147.47 m)
- Beam: 61 ft 1 in (18.62 m)
- Draft: 16 ft 2 in (4.93 m)
- Propulsion: Twin-triple expansion steam engine 4,400 hp (3,281 kW)
- Speed: 12 knots (22 km/h; 14 mph)
- Capacity: (AP): 1,695 troops; (AH): 477 patients
- Complement: (AP): 233
- Armament: (AP); 8 × 5 in (130 mm) guns; 2 × 3"/50 caliber guns; 2 × 1-pounder guns

The first USS Henderson (AP-1) was a transport in the United States Navy during World War I and World War II. In 1943, she was converted to a hospital ship and commissioned as USS Bountiful (AH-9).

Named for Marine Colonel Archibald Henderson, she was launched by Philadelphia Navy Yard on 17 June 1916; sponsored by Miss Genevieve W. Taylor, great-granddaughter of General Henderson; and commissioned at Philadelphia, Pennsylvania on 24 May 1917.

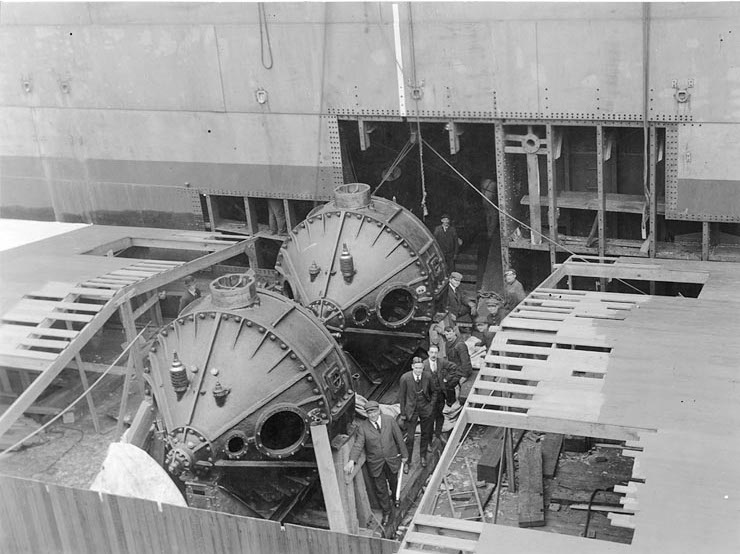
She was the first ship to be fitted with stabilizing gyroscopes

== Service history ==
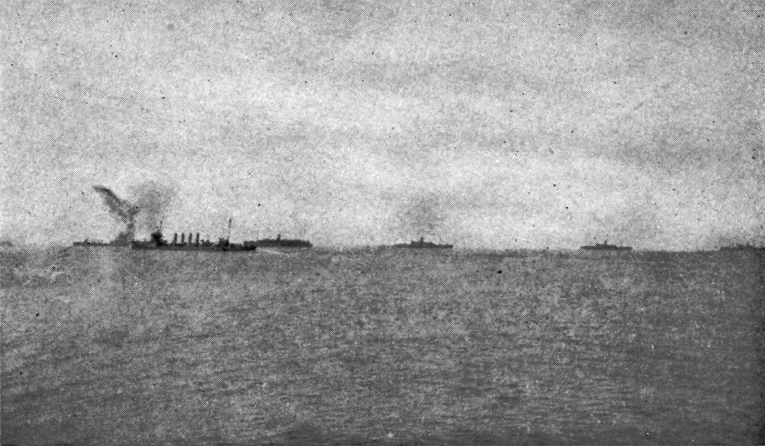
With America's first convoy. The troop ships are the Henderson, Antilles, Momus and Lenape.

=== World War I, 1917–1918 ===
The War Record of the U.S.S. Henderson book with cartoons illustrations, 1919

Henderson arrived New York on 12 June 1917 and sailed two days later with Rear Admiral Albert Gleaves' Cruiser and Transport Force, which carried units of the American Expeditionary Force to France. In her holds she had space for 1,500 men and 24 mules. Reaching Saint-Nazaire on 27 June she disembarked troops and returned to Philadelphia on 17 July 1917. Subsequently, Henderson made eight more voyages to France with troops and supplies for the allies in the bitter European fighting. She established two large base hospitals in France during 1917. In constant danger from submarines, the transport was steaming near Army transport Antilles on 17 October 1917 when the latter was torpedoed. Henderson escaped attack by wrapping herself in an envelope of smoke. But torpedoes were not her only danger.

She sailed for her seventh voyage on 30 June 1918 to France. A serious fire broke out in a cargo hold on 2 July 1918. Working throughout the night, and with Henderson listing as much as 15 degrees, and heavily rolling at times, making landing abreast possible on only one side, the destroyers Mayrant and Paul Jones transferred her 1,600 troop passengers and baggage to the transport Von Steuben without loss of life, completing the transfer by 6:00 am on 3 July. Von Steuben continued on to Brest, France carrying 3,500 troops and their equipment. Determined firefighting crews soon brought the flames under control and Henderson returned to the U.S. with destroyers escorting. On 27 February, one day after departing Saint-Nazaire, troopship Finland 's steering gear jammed, forcing her into the path of Henderson. That ship was able to maneuver such that Finland only dealt her a glancing blow. Finland suffered only superficial damage; Henderson was holed below the waterline, but her crew took advantage of unusually calm February seas to repair the damage, and were soon able to proceed to New York. The transport was carrying a number of wounded soldiers back, to the United States. She sailed again from Philadelphia Tuesday 13 August 1918 and arrived at Brest, France Monday 25 August 1918.

The Henderson may have rammed a U-boat that had just sunk tanker Frank W. Kellogg off the New Jersey coast on 13 August 1918. Lookouts sighted a submarine that was attempting to dive for a torpedo attack and Captain William R. Sayles ordered the rudder hard right attempting to run the enemy down. When the ship was next docked, it was found that her starboard bilge keel had been partly bent and broken. As there is no other explanation, it is believed that this damage was caused by striking the conning tower of the submarine as she was in the act of submerging. After the Armistice U-139 was inspected at Brest where it was noted that not only are the periscopes broken but the thin metal weather screen on the forward side of the conning tower was badly bent as the result of the collision. A German crew member, still on board, stated "the U-139 had encountered an American transport off the Atlantic coast, which had attempted to ram her, and had succeeded in breaking off both periscopes, so that for the remainder of the cruise the submarine was unable to attack while submerged." U-139 was commanded by Lothar von Arnauld de la Periere, the most successful submariner in the Kaiserliche Marine.

=== Caribbean, 1918–1923 ===
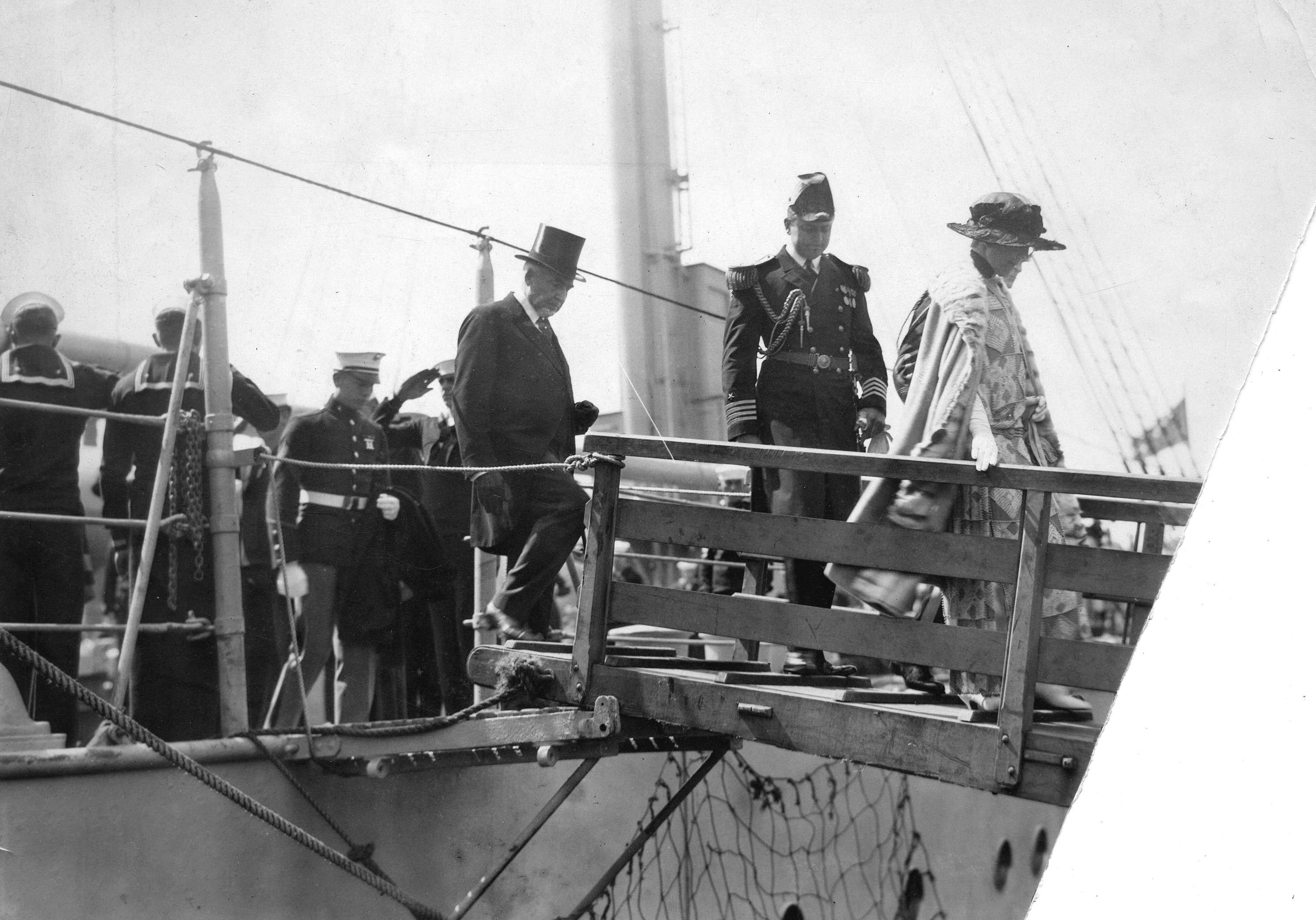
Warren Harding and Florence Harding disembark from the USS Henderson at Vancouver, British Columbia, Canada, July 26, 1923.

Following the armistice, Henderson made eight more transatlantic voyages bringing home members of the A.E.F. She carried more than 10,000 veterans before returning to Philadelphia on 27 December 1919. She then took up duty as troop rotation ship for Marine units in the Caribbean, carrying Marines, their dependents, and supplies to bases in Cuba, Haiti, and other islands. She also participated in Marine training maneuvers in Florida before returning to Philadelphia on 6 July 1920. After an extended period of repairs, the transport resumed her duties in the Caribbean. This was interrupted from 21 June until 21 July as Henderson carried military and civilian leaders to observe the historic bombing tests off the Virginia Capes.

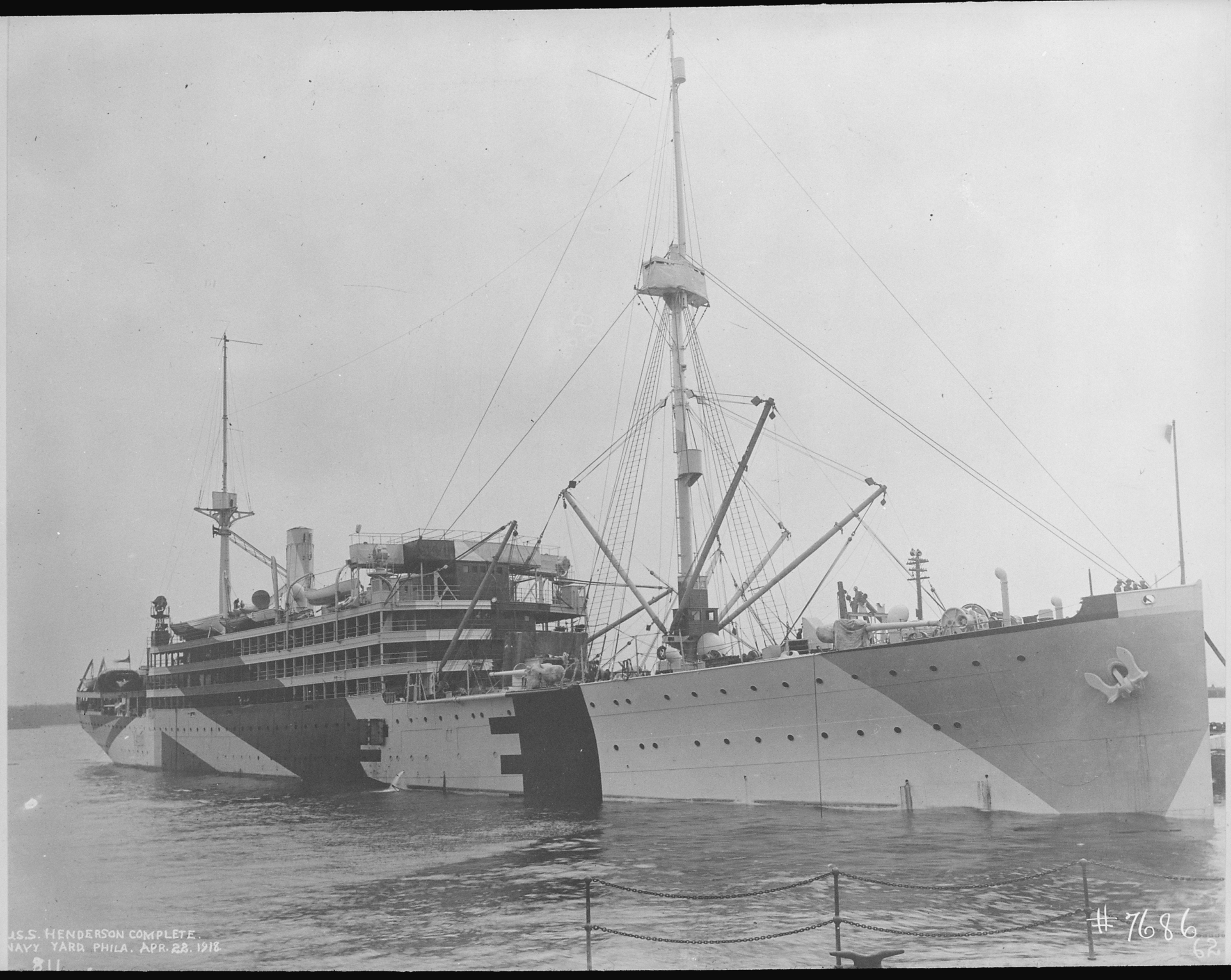
Henderson in camouflage, 1918

During the next few years, she also performed ceremonial duties, embarking a congressional party to observe fleet maneuvers in the Caribbean in the spring of 1923, and carrying President Warren G. Harding on an inspection tour of Alaska in July. The President called at Metlakatla, Ketchikan, Wrangell, Juneau, Skagway, Seward, Valdez, Cordova and Sitka in Alaska, as well as Vancouver, Canada. When approaching Seattle on 27 July in heavy fog, Henderson collided with the destroyer Zeilin (DD-313), which was badly damaged, but with no loss of life. The President's review of the fleet from the transport in Washington state's Elliott Bay then took place, before he disembarked at Seattle, only six days before his death. After departure for San Francisco the following morning, Henderson, was in collision again in fog, causing serious damage to the American barkentine Monterey.

=== Pacific, 1924–1941 ===
During Fleet Problem III in early 1924, Henderson participated in a mock amphibious invasion of the Panama Canal Zone. This major training operation by the fleet helped practice assault techniques and led to improved landing craft as well. The ship also aided in the protection of American interests in the volatile Caribbean states and in the Far East.

Henderson arrived in Shanghai on 2 May 1927 with Marines for the garrison there, and remained in China for six months protecting American nationals in the war-torn country. Here members of her crew originated the "Domain of the Golden Dragon," having cruised back and forth across the International Date Line. The troop transport was engaged in carrying replacements for the fleet and the Marines in China for the next fourteen years.

=== World War II, 1941–1943 ===
Henderson was berthed beside Battleship row and had both troops and women and children on board. On 6 December, Marines from USS Oklahoma and sailors stationed in Pearl Harbor volunteered to escort the women and children back to California in exchange for extra shore leave. When Japanese forces attacked on 7 December 1941, Henderson was outbound from Pearl Harbor. Henderson cleared Pearl Harbor at the end of the attack. The captain feared that the Japanese flotilla would continue on to California, having eliminated any opposition from Hawaii. Henderson would be a slow, conspicuous, and solitary target in their path. He set course for Alaska to avoid being overcome, maintaining strict radio silence even in the face of repeated attempts by the Navy to contact the ship and verify its survival. Henderson then hugged the Pacific Northwest coast down to San Francisco Bay, arriving eleven days after it had been presumed missing in action. During the Pacific War, Henderson continued its service as a transport between California and Hawaii, making over 20 such voyages with fighting men, civilian passengers, and cargo. On her last voyage, she departed Port Hueneme on 18 July 1943 and arrived at Nouméa with 71 much-needed nurses. The transport then sailed to the Solomon Islands with SeaBees before returning to San Francisco on 24 September 1943.

Henderson was decommissioned on 13 October 1943 for conversion to a hospital ship at General Engineering & Dry Dock Company, Oakland, California.

=== Hospital ship, 1944–1946 ===
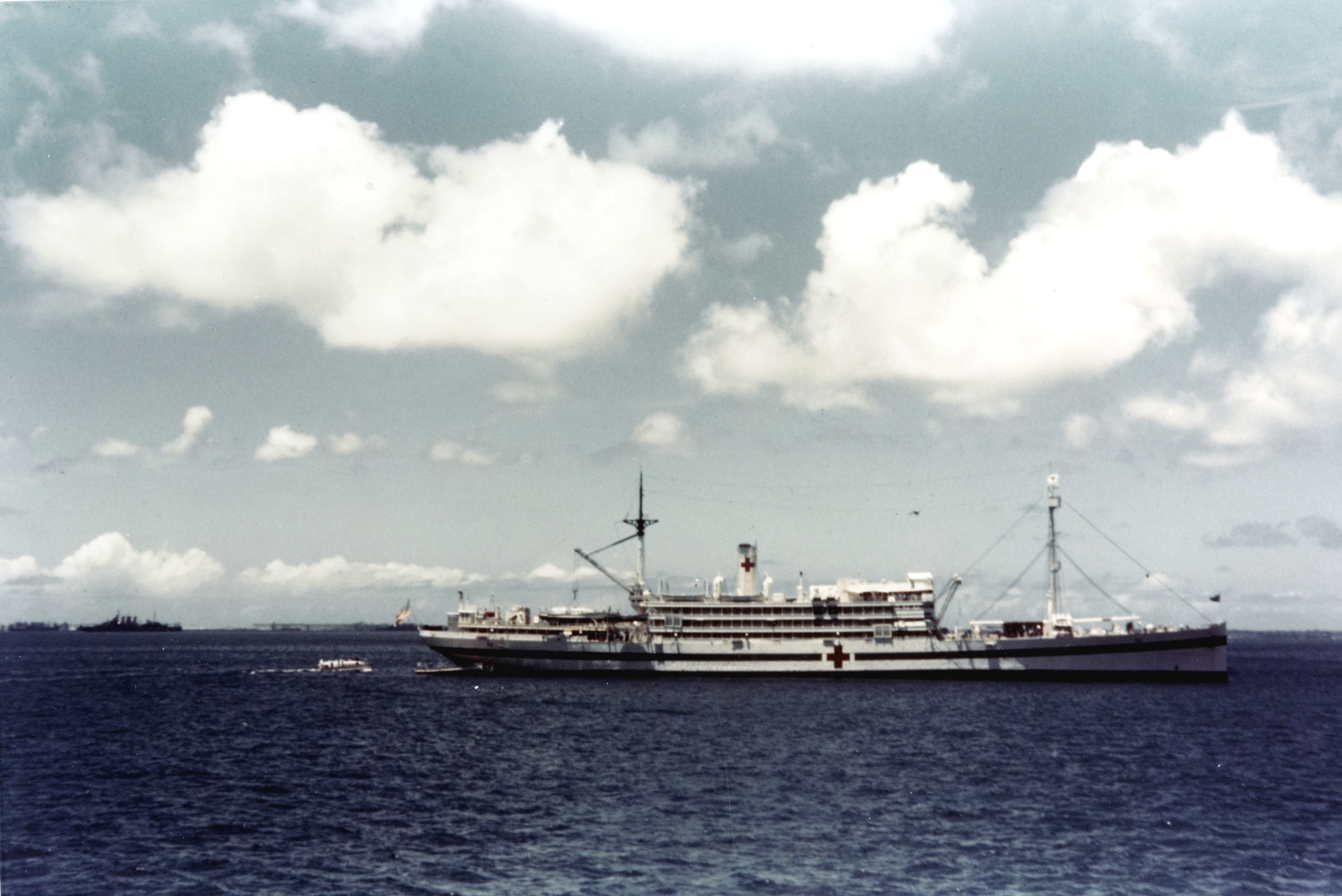
USS Bountiful (AH-9) In a Southwestern Pacific port in 1944–45. (Official U.S. Navy Photograph #: 80-G-K-2138 (Color))

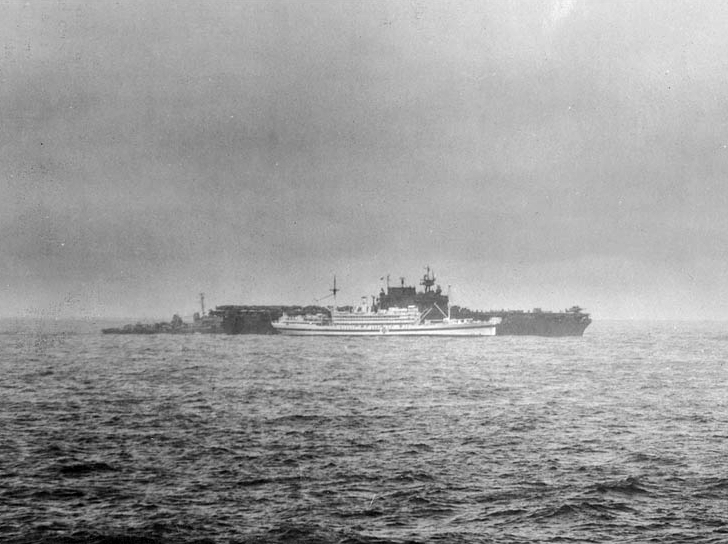
USS Enterprise transferring casualties to USS Bountiful after a kamikaze strike the previous day, 15 May 1945.

The ship was recommissioned as USS Bountiful (AH-9) on 23 March 1944.

Bountiful departed San Francisco on 1 April 1944 for Honolulu, returned later that month, and sailed once more on 1 May for the western Pacific. After brief service at Honolulu and Eniwetok, the ship arrived on 18 June at the Saipan invasion beaches. She made three passages to the hospitals on Kwajalein with casualties of the Marianas invasions. About this time Bountiful established one of the few blood banks in a Naval ship.

The floating hospital remained at Manus until 17 September when she sailed for the Palaus to bring casualties of the Peleliu landing to hospitals in the Solomons. After November Bountiful operated between Leyte and the rear bases carrying veterans of the Philippines campaign. She departed Manus on 24 February 1945 for Ulithi and Saipan to receive casualties of the bitter Iwo Jima assault, and in the next months sailed to rendezvous with the fleet to take on wounded from Iwo Jima, Okinawa, and the fleet units themselves. Returning to Leyte Gulf on 15 June, she remained until 21 July, and then got underway for California. Bountiful arrived after war's end, sailing into San Francisco Bay on 21 August 1945.

Bountiful was then assigned as hospital ship at Yokosuka, Japan, departing San Francisco 1 November 1945. She arrived on 24 November to support the occupation forces, and remained until 27 March 1946 when she sailed for San Francisco. After delivering her patients, the ship sailed on 26 May for the atomic tests at Bikini Atoll, and after providing medical services during the series of nuclear blasts during "Operation Crossroads", she returned to Seattle on 15 August 1946.

=== Decommissioning and sale ===
Bountiful was decommissioned on 13 September 1946, and was sold for scrap by the Maritime Commission on 28 January 1948 to Consolidated Builders, Inc., Seattle.

== Awards ==
Bountiful received four battle stars for World War II service.
