= John Reece =

British billionaire businessman (born 1957)

- Born: March 1957 (age 68–69)
- Education: University of Cambridge
- Occupation: Businessman
- Title: CFO, Ineos

John Reece (born March 1957) is a British billionaire businessman.

== Early life ==
Reece was born in March 1957. He was educated at Bede School, Sunderland (now Sunderland College), and studied economics at Queens' College, Cambridge.

== Career ==
In 2000, Reece, an accountant and partner at PricewaterhouseCoopers, joined the chemicals conglomerate Ineos, and is now the chief financial officer and minority shareholder.

In May 2021, Forbes estimated Reece's net worth to be $5.7 billion.

== Personal life ==
Reece lives in Bougy-Villars, Switzerland.
