= Joe Lewis (businessman) =

British businessman and investor (born 1937)

- Born: Joseph Lewis; 5 February 1937 (age 89); London, England
- Occupations: Businessman, investor, philanthropist
- Years active: 1958–present
- Spouses: Esther Browne (divorced): Jane Lewis
- Children: 2

Joseph C. Lewis (born 5 February 1937) is a British businessman and investor who holds many assets mainly through his Tavistock Group investment portfolio. He was previously the majority owner of ENIC Group, which is also the majority owner of Tottenham Hotspur Football Club, between 1991 until October 2022. Majority ownership was passed to the Lewis Family Trust in October 2022. The Trust is managed by two independent professional trustees on behalf of its beneficiaries. Lewis is not a beneficiary.

According to the Sunday Times Rich List in 2023, Lewis has a net worth of £5.096 billion, an increase of £811 million from 2022.

== Early life ==
Lewis was born to a Jewish family above a public house in Roman Road, Bow, London. Lewis left school at 15 to help run his father's West End catering business, Tavistock Banqueting. After he took charge, he quickly expanded it by selling luxury goods to American tourists, and also owned West End club the Hanover Grand, where he gave Robert Earl his first job. He later sold the business in 1979 to make his initial wealth.

== Currency trading ==
After selling the family business in the late 1970s, Lewis moved into currency trading in the 1980s and 1990s, resulting in his move to the Bahamas where he is now a tax exile. In September 1992, Lewis bet on the pound's crashing out of the European Exchange Rate Mechanism. The event was dubbed Black Wednesday.

== Tavistock Group ==
Lewis is the main investor in Tavistock Group, which owns more than 200 companies in 15 countries.

== Property ==
Lewis hosted the Tavistock Cup tournament every March from 2004 through 2013, in Florida, raising millions of dollars for charity, and owns three of the six clubs that competed in 2013: Albany, Lake Nona Golf & Country Club and Isleworth Golf & Country Club. Lewis built a golf community in the Bahamas called Albany, which opened in October 2010. Lewis currently resides in Albany. Tiger Woods and Ernie Els are also major shareholders in the luxury resort community located in New Providence. Lewis made a £70 million investment in Bulgarian property development.

== Lake Nona Medical City ==
Lewis seeded Lake Nona, covering 7,000 acres next to Orlando's international airport, with $100 million in gifts and land which was cultivated into a large-scale community offering research and educational facilities, hospitals for veterans and children, a town centre, and a range of workspaces and residential options.

== Lewis Scholarship ==
The Lewis Scholarship supports Bahamian students pursuing undergraduate and graduate degrees at the University of Central Florida. The program is run by Lewis' granddaughter, Dr. Alexandra Silverton. The scholarship helps remove financial barriers to higher education through tuition assistance, housing support, travel coverage and one-on-one mentorship.

== Bear Stearns ==
On 10 September 2007, Lewis paid US$860.4 million in an all-cash purchase of a 7% stake in Bear Stearns. By December 2007 Lewis had raised his stake at the brokerage firm to 9.4%, a total of 11 million shares, for which he paid an average price of $107 apiece. After the purchase of Bear Stearns by JPMorgan Chase for $10 a share, it was estimated that Lewis lost $1.16 billion on his investment.

== Mitchells & Butlers ==
Lewis is the largest shareholder in the British public house group Mitchells & Butlers, controlling 26.85% of the issued share capital through his investment vehicle Piedmont, which he built up since 2008.

== Insider trading conviction ==
On 25 July 2023, United States attorney for the Southern District of New York Damian Williams announced that Lewis would be charged for multiple counts of insider trading. Lewis was accused of tipping off employees, associates, friends, and romantic interests with non-public information about various entities and lending some of them hundreds of thousands of dollars to trade on the privileged knowledge. Lewis surrendered himself to the Manhattan authorities on 26 July 2023, pleading guilty to the charges in January 2024. In April 2024, Lewis was spared jail time after admitting insider trading, sentenced to probation, and fined $5 million. President Donald Trump pardoned Lewis on 13 November 2025 so that he could visit his grandchildren and receive medical treatment in the US.

== Personal life ==
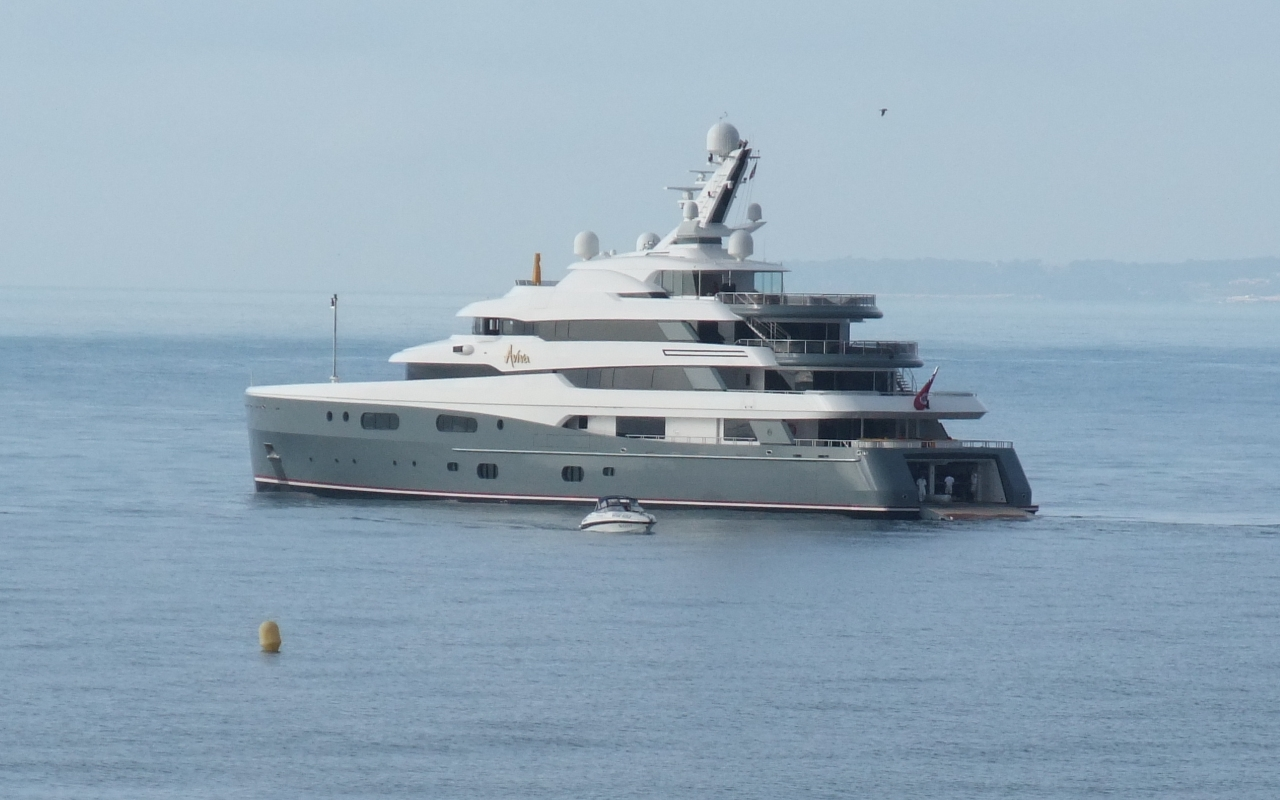
Superyacht Aviva

Lewis has been married twice. His first marriage to Esther Browne ended in divorce. They had two children, including Vivienne, who is seen as his heir and is on Tavistock's board of directors. She is divorced from Toby Silverton, the former chairman of Bristol Cars, once fully owned by Tavistock. Lewis is now married to Jane Lewis.

Lewis owns the superyacht Aviva.

== Art collection ==
Lewis' art collection is estimated to be worth $1 billion and includes works by Picasso, Matisse, Lucian Freud and sculptor Henry Moore, Lewis bought Francis Bacon's Triptych 1974–1977 in 2008 for £26.3 million, then a record for postwar artwork bought in Europe. In November 2018 Joe Lewis sold his Portrait of an Artist (Pool with Two Figures) by David Hockney in Christie's salesroom for $90.3 million.

Lewis is the owner of several versions of Arturo Di Modica's Charging Bull, possibly including the original, which the artist installed during the middle of the night on 15 December 1989 on Wall Street with no prior permission from the authorities. Lewis, however, claims as of 2026 not to own the original version of the statue installed on Bowling Green.

== See also ==
- List of people granted executive clemency in the second Trump presidency
