= Underway =

State of a vessel free to move through the water

Underway, or under way, is a nautical term describing the state of a vessel which is unconstrained from horizontal translational movement relative to the water and the ground. "Way" arises when there is sufficient water flow past the rudder of a vessel that it can be steered. A vessel is said to be underway if it meets the following criteria:

- It is not aground
- It is not at anchor
- It has not been made fast to a dock, the shore, or other stationary object.

If a vessel is adrift and not being propelled by any instrument or device, it is said to be underway, not making way.

"Under weigh" is a variation, coming from folk etymology, first used in 1749. "Under way" is likely [probably] from the Dutch onderweg or Middle Dutch onderwegen (lit. "under" or "among the ways"). Weigh is also a synonym for hanging or dangling, so that the process of raising an anchor, which causes it to hang at the end of the anchor-rope or chain is called “weighing [the] anchor” which leads to confusion between weigh and way, since both are pronounced identically.
