= Abeking & Rasmussen =

Shipyard in Lower Saxony, Germany

Coordinates: 53°09′58″N 8°37′04″E

Abeking & Rasmussen Schiffs- und Yachtwerft SE
- Company type: Societas Europaea (SE)
- Industry: Shipbuilding, defence
- Founded: 1907; 119 years ago
- Founder: Georg Abeking and Henry Rasmussen
- Headquarters: Lemwerder, Wesermarsch, Lower Saxony, Germany
- Area served: Worldwide
- Key people: Hans M. Schaedla (CEO)
- Products: Warships, research vessels, yachts
- Website: www.abeking.com

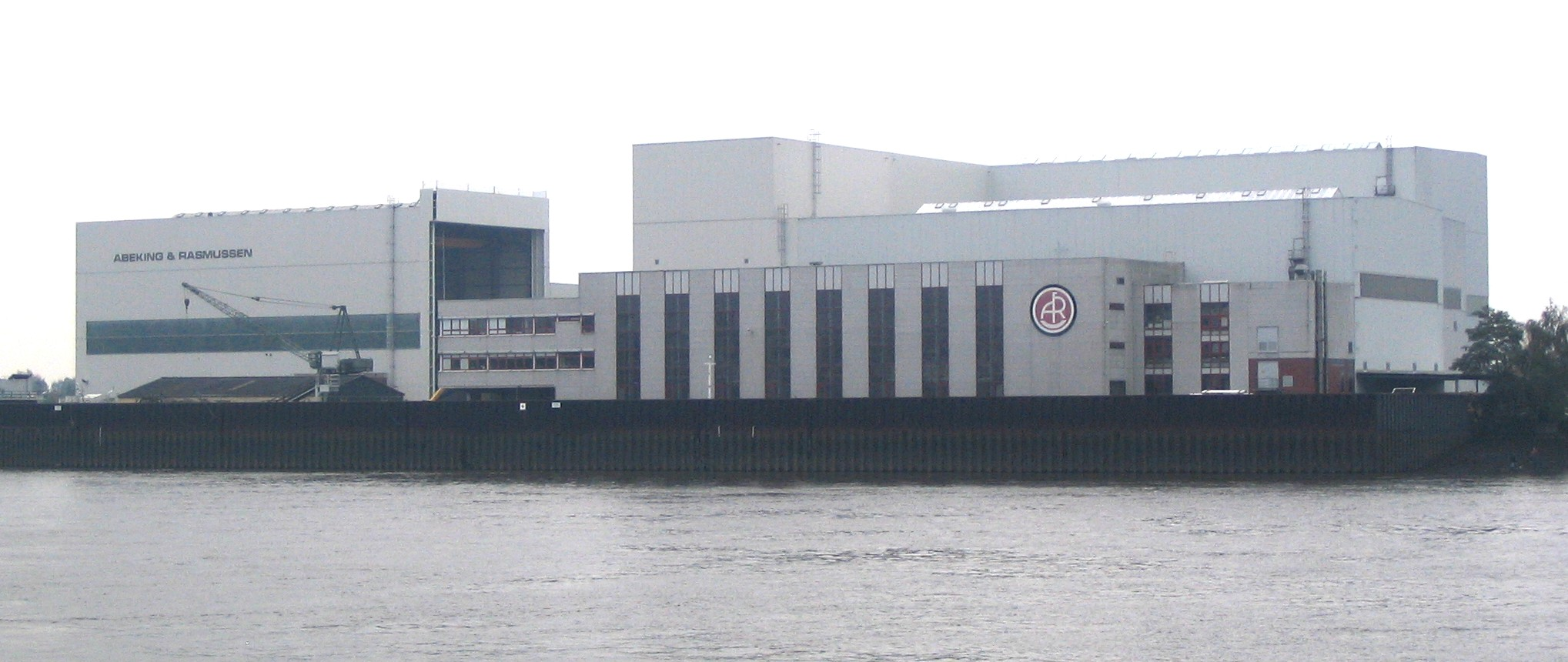
The Abeking & Rasmussen shipyard

Abeking & Rasmussen (A&R) is a shipyard situated in Lemwerder, near Bremen in the German state of Lower Saxony. The shipyard is on the left bank of the River Weser, and currently comprises five production halls with associated workshops and offices, an inner harbour and a syncrolift.

== History ==
The business was founded in 1907 by Georg Abeking and Henry Rasmussen. Abeking, mechanical engineer at the Nordseewerke yard in the harbour of the north German city of Emden, was a friend of Rasmussen and became his partner. With the support of the Grand Duke of Oldenburg, a sailing enthusiast, Abeking and Rasmussen founded their yacht- and shipyard at Lemwerder on the south side of the Weser, opposite the small town of Vegesack. Rasmussen, who idolised American yacht designer Nathanael Herreshoff, was known as a talented yacht skipper and proved to be equally adept as a yacht designer himself. Rasmussen built his first sailing yacht, a vessel called Frisia in the 5-metre class, for himself in the initial year of the Abeking & Rasmussen yard's operation. In its early years, the yard worked for the private, commercial and military sectors, building wooden sailing yachts and motor yachts, together with patrol boats and other specialised vessels.

In 1928, the yard began building Starling Burgess' Atlantic one-design; at this time, the post-war economy made European-built boats attractive in the United States.

Today the yard continues to construct a similar spread of vessels, building yachts alongside naval vessels, pilot boats and similar ships. The yard is particularly well known for a number of superyachts, and for its work in the development of small-waterplane-area twin hull (SWATH) ships.

A&R built its last yacht with a varnished hull, the 11.4 m saling yacht Barbarella, in 1981. The shipyard's own cost–benefit analysis showed the continued building of smaller yachts to be impracticable, consequently it has concentrated on the exclusive market of superyachts. Among those the yard has built since is the Bruce King-designed ketch Hetairos, now Asgard (42 m LOA), a 230-ton centreboarder with a cold-moulded hull made of African khaya and sipo mahogany. Fitted with a 42 m main mast, the ship draws 3 m with the bronze centreboard retracted and 8.7 m in veered position. Built for a European owner and launched in 1993, the vessel's construction is in classic yacht style.

== See also ==
- List of yachts built by Abeking & Rasmussen
