= Yachts impacted by international sanctions following the Russian invasion of Ukraine =

International sanctions have been imposed during the Russo-Ukrainian War by a large number of countries, including the United States, Canada, the European Union, and a number of international organisations against Russia, Crimea, and Belarus following the Russian invasion of Ukraine, which began in late February 2014. These sanctions were imposed against individuals, businesses, officials and assets such as yachts from Russia, Belarus and Ukraine.

== Impacted yachts ==
Name	Owner	Action taken				Photo	Refs
Name	Owner	Date	Action	By	Status	Photo	Refs
M/Y A	Andrey Melnichenko		Flag state deregistered	Isle of Man	Sailed to Ras Al Khaimah in the United Arab Emirates and stuck in port until a new flag state is found.		
S/Y A	Andrey Melnichenko	12 March 2022	Arrested	Italy			
Alfa Nero	Andrey Guryev		Seized	Antigua and Barbuda	The yacht was abandoned in the harbour since February 2022. She was auctioned off in 2023 but the auction failed to conclude, so the government of Antigua and Barbuda sold the ship to businessman Ali Riza Yildirim for $ 40 million in 2024.		
Alfa Nero	Andrey Guryev	TBA	Auction date	Antigua and Barbuda	The yacht was abandoned in the harbour since February 2022. She was auctioned off in 2023 but the auction failed to conclude, so the government of Antigua and Barbuda sold the ship to businessman Ali Riza Yildirim for $ 40 million in 2024.		
Amadea	Suleyman Kerimov	4 May 2022	Arrested	Fiji	Transported by a US crew to San Diego.		
Amadea	Suleyman Kerimov	27 May 2022	Seized	United States	Transported by a US crew to San Diego.		
Amore Vero	Igor Sechin	2 March 2022	Arrested	France			
Axioma	Dmitry Pumpyansky	22 March 2022	Arrested	Gibraltar	Axioma was arrested by Gibraltar authorities on behalf of JPMorgan Chase. Later she was officially seized and put up for auction on 23 August 2022. On 27 September 2022 it was announced that the winning bid was selected out of a total of 63, and is worth $37.5m.		
Axioma	Dmitry Pumpyansky		Seized	Gibraltar	Axioma was arrested by Gibraltar authorities on behalf of JPMorgan Chase. Later she was officially seized and put up for auction on 23 August 2022. On 27 September 2022 it was announced that the winning bid was selected out of a total of 63, and is worth $37.5m.		
Axioma	Dmitry Pumpyansky	23 August 2022	Auction date	Gibraltar	Axioma was arrested by Gibraltar authorities on behalf of JPMorgan Chase. Later she was officially seized and put up for auction on 23 August 2022. On 27 September 2022 it was announced that the winning bid was selected out of a total of 63, and is worth $37.5m.		
Axioma	Dmitry Pumpyansky	27 September 2022	Winning bid selected	Gibraltar	Axioma was arrested by Gibraltar authorities on behalf of JPMorgan Chase. Later she was officially seized and put up for auction on 23 August 2022. On 27 September 2022 it was announced that the winning bid was selected out of a total of 63, and is worth $37.5m.		
Crescent	Igor Sechin	15 March 2022	Arrested	Spain			
Dilbar	Alisher Usmanov	3 March 2022	Sanctioned	United States			
Dilbar	Alisher Usmanov	3 March 2022	Arrested	Germany			
Firebird	Andrey Yakunin	17 October 2022	Arrested	Norway	Both yacht and owner were arrested after drones were flying from the yacht and presumably taking pictures of strategic areas, which is not allowed under current sanctions.		
Flying Fox	Dmitry Kamenshchik	28 March 2022	Arrested	Dominican Republic	Flying Fox was briefly detained and searched in the Dominican Republic and released due to no evidence of wrongdoing. As soon as she was released, she started crossing the Atlantic Ocean towards Turkey. Later Flying Fox was added to the US sanctions list due to its association with Imperial Yachts. Flying Fox was removed from the US sanctions list on the 30th of September 2024 after breaking ties with Imperial Yachts		
Flying Fox	Dmitry Kamenshchik		Released	Dominican Republic	Flying Fox was briefly detained and searched in the Dominican Republic and released due to no evidence of wrongdoing. As soon as she was released, she started crossing the Atlantic Ocean towards Turkey. Later Flying Fox was added to the US sanctions list due to its association with Imperial Yachts. Flying Fox was removed from the US sanctions list on the 30th of September 2024 after breaking ties with Imperial Yachts		
Flying Fox	Dmitry Kamenshchik	3 June 2022	Sanctioned	United States	Flying Fox was briefly detained and searched in the Dominican Republic and released due to no evidence of wrongdoing. As soon as she was released, she started crossing the Atlantic Ocean towards Turkey. Later Flying Fox was added to the US sanctions list due to its association with Imperial Yachts. Flying Fox was removed from the US sanctions list on the 30th of September 2024 after breaking ties with Imperial Yachts		
Flying Fox	Dmitry Kamenshchik	30 September	Unsanctioned	United States	Flying Fox was briefly detained and searched in the Dominican Republic and released due to no evidence of wrongdoing. As soon as she was released, she started crossing the Atlantic Ocean towards Turkey. Later Flying Fox was added to the US sanctions list due to its association with Imperial Yachts. Flying Fox was removed from the US sanctions list on the 30th of September 2024 after breaking ties with Imperial Yachts		
Galactica	Vagit Alekperov	3 March 2022	Sanctioned	Netherlands	Since Galactica was still being fitted out by the yard, she was not allowed to be delivered to her owner because of sanctions.		
Garcon	Roman Abramovich	March 2022	Arrested	Antigua and Barbuda	Garcon was arrested on Antigua at the request of the United Kingdom. The reason for her release is unknown but as soon as she was she started crossing the Atlantic Ocean towards Morocco.		
Garcon	Roman Abramovich	22 July 2022	Released	Antigua and Barbuda	Garcon was arrested on Antigua at the request of the United Kingdom. The reason for her release is unknown but as soon as she was she started crossing the Atlantic Ocean towards Morocco.		
Graceful	Russian Government; Vladimir Putin (alleged)	3 June 2022	Sanctioned	United States	Graceful left Blohm + Voss, Germany abruptly mid refit on 9 February 2022. She was hiding from sanctions in Kaliningrad, Russia. Her AIS tracker was turned off in August 2022. In June 2026 she was spotted leaving the Baltic Sea, escorted by Russian destroyer Severomorsk and the alleged salvage vessel Voevoda (Project 23700), passing the island of Anholt on 29 June.		
Halo	Roman Abramovich	March 2022	Arrested	Antigua and Barbuda	Halo was arrested on Antigua at the request of the United Kingdom. The reason for her release is unknown but as soon as she was she started crossing the Atlantic Ocean towards Morocco.		
Halo	Roman Abramovich	22 July 2022	Released	Antigua and Barbuda	Halo was arrested on Antigua at the request of the United Kingdom. The reason for her release is unknown but as soon as she was she started crossing the Atlantic Ocean towards Morocco.		
Lady Anastasia	Aleksandr Mikheyev	26 February 2022	Attempted scuttling	Taras Ostapchuk (ships engineer)			
Lady Anastasia	Aleksandr Mikheyev	15 March 2022	Arrested	Spain			
Lady M	Alexei Mordashov	5 March 2022	Arrested	Italy			
Lena	Gennady Timchenko	5 March 2022	Arrested	Italy			
Luna	Farkhad Akhmedov	12 May 2022	Arrested	Germany			
Madame Gu	Andrei Skoch	3 June 2022	Sanctioned	United States	Madame Gu is hiding from sanctions in Dubai, UAE.		
New Vogue		2 April 2022	Arrested	Italy			
Olympia	Vladimir Putin	3 June 2022	Sanctioned	United States	Olympia is hiding from sanctions in Russia.		
PHI	Vitaly Vasilievich Kochetkov	29 March 2022	Arrested	United Kingdom			
Quantum Blue	Sergey Galitsky	3 March 2022	Arrested	Monaco			
Quantum Blue	Sergey Galitsky	4 March 2022	Released	Monaco			
Ragnar	Vladimir Strzhalkovsky	23 February 2022	Inspected	Norway	Because the owner is Russian, local fuel companies refused to sell fuel to the yacht causing her to be stuck in Narvik. The Norwegian government had to order a different company to deliver fuel so she could leave.		
Ragnar	Vladimir Strzhalkovsky		Arrested	The people of Norway	Because the owner is Russian, local fuel companies refused to sell fuel to the yacht causing her to be stuck in Narvik. The Norwegian government had to order a different company to deliver fuel so she could leave.		
Ragnar	Vladimir Strzhalkovsky	30 March 2022	Released	Norway	Because the owner is Russian, local fuel companies refused to sell fuel to the yacht causing her to be stuck in Narvik. The Norwegian government had to order a different company to deliver fuel so she could leave.		
Royal Romance	Viktor Medvedchuk	23 March 2022	Arrested	Croatia	Following the arrest of the owner, the yacht was arrested by Croatian authorities in Split. On 1 December 2022 it was announced she was seized and set to be auctioned off by the Asset Recovery and Management Agency. An auction date is not announced as of 1 December 2022.		
Royal Romance	Viktor Medvedchuk	1 December 2022	Seized	Croatia	Following the arrest of the owner, the yacht was arrested by Croatian authorities in Split. On 1 December 2022 it was announced she was seized and set to be auctioned off by the Asset Recovery and Management Agency. An auction date is not announced as of 1 December 2022.		
Royal Romance	Viktor Medvedchuk	TBA	Auction date	Croatia	Following the arrest of the owner, the yacht was arrested by Croatian authorities in Split. On 1 December 2022 it was announced she was seized and set to be auctioned off by the Asset Recovery and Management Agency. An auction date is not announced as of 1 December 2022.		
Royal Romance	Viktor Medvedchuk	TBA	Winning bid selected	Croatia	Following the arrest of the owner, the yacht was arrested by Croatian authorities in Split. On 1 December 2022 it was announced she was seized and set to be auctioned off by the Asset Recovery and Management Agency. An auction date is not announced as of 1 December 2022.		
Scheherazade	Eduard Khudainatov	9 May 2022	Arrested	Italy			
Sea Rhapsody	Andrey Kostin	3 June 2022	Sanctioned	United States	Sea Rhapsody is hiding from sanctions in the Seychelles.		
Tango	Viktor Vekselberg	5 April 2022	Seized	United States	She was boarded by Spanish and US agencies and subsequently seized by the US.		
Valerie	Sergey Chemezov	15 March 2022	Arrested	Spain	MY Valerie was arrested while being moored at the MB92 shipyard in Barcelona. She later changed the name to Meridian A in an effort to confuse Spanish officials and try to escape the arrest. Following a relocation from the refit yard where she was taking up space since her arrest to a vacant berth the owner stopped paying for the berthing fees and the yacht was subsequently seized.		
Valerie	Sergey Chemezov	4 November 2022	Seized	Spain	MY Valerie was arrested while being moored at the MB92 shipyard in Barcelona. She later changed the name to Meridian A in an effort to confuse Spanish officials and try to escape the arrest. Following a relocation from the refit yard where she was taking up space since her arrest to a vacant berth the owner stopped paying for the berthing fees and the yacht was subsequently seized.		

== Other sanctioned yacht owners ==
Below a list of yachts that have not directly been impacted by sanctions but do have owners that are on one or more sanction lists.

Owner	Yacht	Photo	Refs
Alexander Abramov	Titan		
Roman Abramovich	Eclipse		
Roman Abramovich	Solaris		
Roman Abramovich	Sussurro		
Vagit Alekperov	Galactica Super Nova		
Vagit Alekperov	Galactica Plus		
David Davidovich	Aquamarine		
Oleg Deripaska	Clio		
Oleg Deripaska	Sputnik		
Filaret Galchev	Sapphire		
Ihor Kolomoyskyi	Lauren L		
Dmitry Medvedev	Universe		
Leonid Mikhelson	Pacific		
Andrey Molchanov	Aurora		
Alexei Mordashov	Nord		
God Nisanov	Galaxy of Happiness		
Vladimir Potanin	Nirvana		
Vladimir Potanin	Feadship BN1010		
Viktor Rashnikov	Ocean Victory		
Arkady Rotenberg	Rahil		
Eugene Shvidler	Le Grand Bleu		
Alexander Svetakov	Cloudbreak		
Rustem Teregulov	Grand Rusalina		
Oleg Tinkov	La Datcha		

== See also ==
- List of large sailing yachts
- List of motor yachts by length
- Luxury yacht
- Sailing yacht
