= Party Girl =

Party Girl or Party Girls may refer to:

== Film and TV ==
- Party Girl (1930 film), starring Marie Prevost
- Party Girl (1958 film), starring Robert Taylor and Cyd Charisse
- Party Girl (1995 film), starring Parker Posey
- Party Girl (2014 film), a French film
- Party Girl (TV series), a 1996 short-lived series based on the 1995 film and starring Christine Taylor
- "Party Girl", an episode of the 1990s sitcom Brotherly Love (1995 TV series)

== Songs ==
- "Party Girl" (Girlband song)
- "Party Girl" (Grace Jones song)
- "Party Girl" (McFly song)
- "Party Girl" (U2 song)
- "Party Girl" (StaySolidRocky song)
- "Party Girl", a Bernadette Carroll single produced and co-written by Ernie Maresca
- "Party Girl", a song from Elvis Costello and the Attractions' album Armed Forces
  - A cover of the above song featured on Linda Ronstadt's Mad Love
- "Party Girl", a song written by Buddy Buie and released as a single by Tommy Roe in 1964
- "Party Girl", a song by Asher Roth
- "Party Girls", a 2014 song by Ludacris.
- "Party Girls", Mink DeVille from album Cabretta
- "Party Girls", song by Swazy Styles featuring Qwote 2010
- "Party Girls", single by Ya Boy featuring Rico Love from Rich Rocka

== Other uses ==
- Party Girl (yacht), a 2012 yacht
- Party Girl, a 2007 novel by sex columnist Anna David (journalist)
