= Olympia (yacht) =

2002 superyacht by Feadship

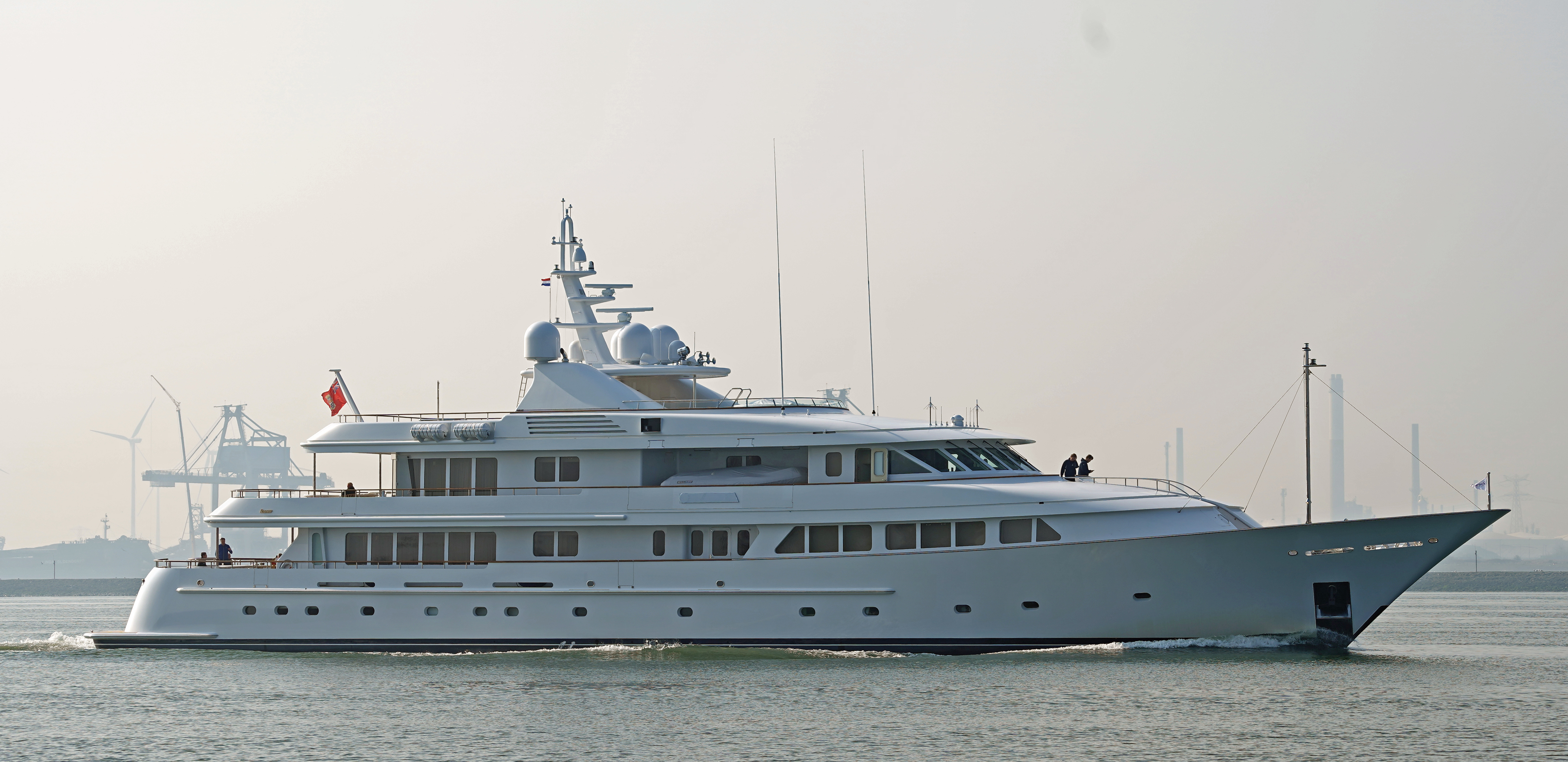
- Olympia

History

Cayman IslandsRussia
- Owner: Russian Government
- Builder: Feadship, Aalsmeer, Netherlands
- Laid down: 1999
- Completed: 2002
- Identification: IMO number: 1006960; MMSI number: 319766000; Callsign:ZCGR
- Status: sanctioned in 2022

General characteristics Olympia
- Class & type: Motor yacht
- Tonnage: 776 GT
- Length: 57 m (187 ft)
- Beam: 10.1 m (33 ft)
- Draft: 2.95 m (9.7 ft)
- Propulsion: 2x 1,500hp diesel engines
- Speed: 15.5 knots (29 km/h) (maximum)
- Range: 4,700 nm
- Capacity: 10 guests
- Crew: 16
- Notes: 5 cabins

Olympia is a motor superyacht built by Feadship in Aalsmeer, the Netherlands. Construction started in 1999, and the vessel was delivered in 2002. The vessel has been linked to President Putin and been sanctioned in 2022.

== Design and specifications ==
The vessel was designed by De Voogt Naval Architects (exterior) and Mark Hampton/John Gallagher (interior). The hull is of steel and the superstructure of aluminum. The vessel's length is 57 metres (187 ft) with a beam of 10.5 metres (34 ft) and a draft of 2.95 metres (9.7 ft). The enclosed volume is 778 GT. It has three decks with 5 cabins for 10 guests, and crew quarters for 16. The sundeck has a spa pool. The owner's quarters include a private study.

== Performance and energy consumption ==
The ship has a maximum speed of 15 knots and a cruising speed of 13 knots with a range of 4,700 nm. It has twin Caterpillar 1,500hp diesel engines for propulsion with twin propellers. The fuel tanks take 100,000 liters. Two Caterpillar electrical generators can independently supply the yacht's electrical needs. The generators are linked to a Halyard exhaust-cleaning system.

== Ownership ==
SCF Management Services / Ironstone Marine Investments, Russian shell or holding companies from Cyprus, are listed as the original owners. The vessel seems to be property of entities of the Russian Government and is considered to be one of Putin's yachts. Since June of 2022, the yacht has been sanctioned by the United States Treasury Department together with the ships Kosatka, Shellest and Nega.

== History ==
The vessel was refitted in 2008.

In April 2021, shortly after the Russian invasion of Ukraine, Olympia was relocated from Rotterdam to Russia. The last known location of the yacht was the port of St. Petersburg on May 2, 2021. Since then, the AIS has been silent. The current location of the yacht is not known.

== Comment ==
In 2014, the Feadship Monara, launched in 1969, had also been named Olympia at the time of her refit.

== See also ==
- Yachts impacted by international sanctions following the Russian invasion of Ukraine
