= Lady Anastasia =

History

Saint Vincent and the Grenadines
- Name: Lady Anastasia; Aria
- Builder: Sensation Yachts, Auckland
- Launched: 2001
- Homeport: Kingstown
- Identification: IMO number: 8742496; MMSI number: 377423000; Callsign: J8Y4288

General characteristics
- Tonnage: 476
- Length: 47.75 m (156 ft 8 in)
- Beam: 8.5 m (27 ft 11 in)
- Draft: 2.2 m (7 ft 3 in)
- Decks: 4
- Propulsion: 2 × 2,650 hp (1,980 kW) diesel, twin-screw
- Crew: 9

MY Lady Anastasia (formerly Aria) is a 47.75 m (156 ft 8 in) luxury motor yacht. The luxury yacht was built in 2001 by Sensation Yachts. In 2022, the yacht became embroiled with the fallout from the Russo-Ukrainian War, with a crew member attempting to scuttle it, and authorities seizing it pursuant to sanctions against Russia.

== History ==
In 2001, the yacht was launched by Sensation Yachts in New Zealand She was launched under the name Aria. for Robert Milhous.

In 2018, the yacht was placed on sale.

In February 2022, chief engineer Taras Ostapchuk tried to sabotage and sink the superyacht by intentional scuttling through opening the seacocks, at Port Adriano, Palma, Mallorca, Spain. He was unsuccessful as other crew members were alerted by alarm and rescued the ship. Ostapchuk attempted to take action against the head of Rosoboronexport, arms oligarch and yacht owner Aleksandr Mikheyev, in revenge for Russia attacking Kyiv during the 2022 Russian invasion of Ukraine.

In March 2022, Spanish authorities seized the yacht pursuant to European Union sanctions against Mikheev.

== Specifications ==
- Designer: Donald Starkey
- Naval architect: Ray Harvey
- Shipyard: Sensation Yachts, Auckland, New Zealand
- Length: 47.75 m (156 ft 8 in)
- Beam: 8.5 m (27 ft 11 in)
- Draft: 2.2 m (7 ft 3 in)
- Gross tonnage: 476
- Decks: 4
- Guests: 10
- Crew: 9
- Cabins: 5
- Propulsion: 2 × 2,650 hp (1,980 kW) diesel, twin-screw

== Registration ==
- Flag nation: Saint Vincent and the Grenadines
- IMO number: 8742496
- MMSI number: 377423000
- Callsign: J8Y4288
- Home port: Kingstown
