= Baton Rouge (yacht) =

2010 superyacht

History

United Kingdom
- Name: Baton Rouge
- Owner: Martin Bouygues
- Builder: ICON Yachts
- Yard number: 003
- Launched: 2010
- In service: 2010
- Identification: IMO number: 1010935; MMSI number: 235077185; Callsign: 2CZZ7

General characteristics
- Class & type: Motor yacht
- Tonnage: 1423 gross tons
- Length: 62.50 m (205.1 ft)
- Beam: 11.40 m (37.4 ft)
- Draught: 3.70 m (12.1 ft)
- Propulsion: twin diesel MTU 12V4000M71 engines
- Speed: 16 knots (30 km/h) (max)
- Capacity: 12 guests
- Crew: 18

The 62.50 m (205.1 ft) superyacht Baton Rouge was launched by ICON Yachts at their yard in Harlingen. The interior design of Baton Rouge was done by Tim Heywood and the exterior work was done by Redman Whiteley Dixon. She has two sister ships, the 2013 built Party Girl and the lengthened 2009 built Icon.

She is available as a charter yacht.

== Design ==
Her length is 62.50 m (205.1 ft), beam is 11.40 m (37.4 ft) and she has a draught of 3.70 m (12.1 ft). The hull is built out of steel while the superstructure is made out of aluminium with teak laid decks. The yacht is Lloyd's registered, issued by United Kingdom.

== Engines ==
She is powered by twin diesel MTU 12V4000M71 engines.

== See also ==
- List of motor yachts by length
- ICON Yachts
- MY Party Girl
- MY Icon
