= Loon (yacht) =

Superyacht by ICON Yachts

History

Cayman Islands
- Name: Icon
- Owner: Private
- Builder: ICON Yachts
- Yard number: 001
- Launched: 2009
- In service: 2009
- Identification: IMO number: 1010246; MMSI number: 319124900; Callsign: PBUG

General characteristics
- Class & type: Motor yacht
- Tonnage: 1423 gross tons
- Length: 67.50 m (221.5 ft)
- Beam: 11.40 m (37.4 ft)
- Draught: 3.40 m (11.2 ft)
- Propulsion: twin diesel MTU 12V4000M71 engines
- Speed: 16 knots (30 km/h) (max)
- Capacity: 12 guests
- Crew: 18

The 67.50 m (221.5 ft) superyacht Loon (former Icon) was launched by ICON Yachts at their yard in Harlingen. The interior design of Icon was done by Studio Linse and the exterior work was done by Redman Whiteley Dixon. There are two sister ships, the 2013 built Party Girl and the 2013 built Baton Rouge.

The ship is available as a charter yacht.

== Design ==
The ship length is 67.50 m (221.5 ft), beam is 11.40 m (37.4 ft) and has a draught of 3.40 m (11.2 ft). The ship was built as a 62.50 m (205.1 ft) yacht, but was lengthened in 2014. The hull is built out of steel while the superstructure is made out of aluminium with teak laid decks. The yacht is Lloyd's registered, issued by Cayman Islands.

== Engines ==
The ship is powered by twin diesel MTU 12V4000M71 engines.

== See also ==
- List of motor yachts by length
- ICON Yachts
- MY Baton Rouge
- MY Party Girl
