= PHI (yacht) =

Yacht

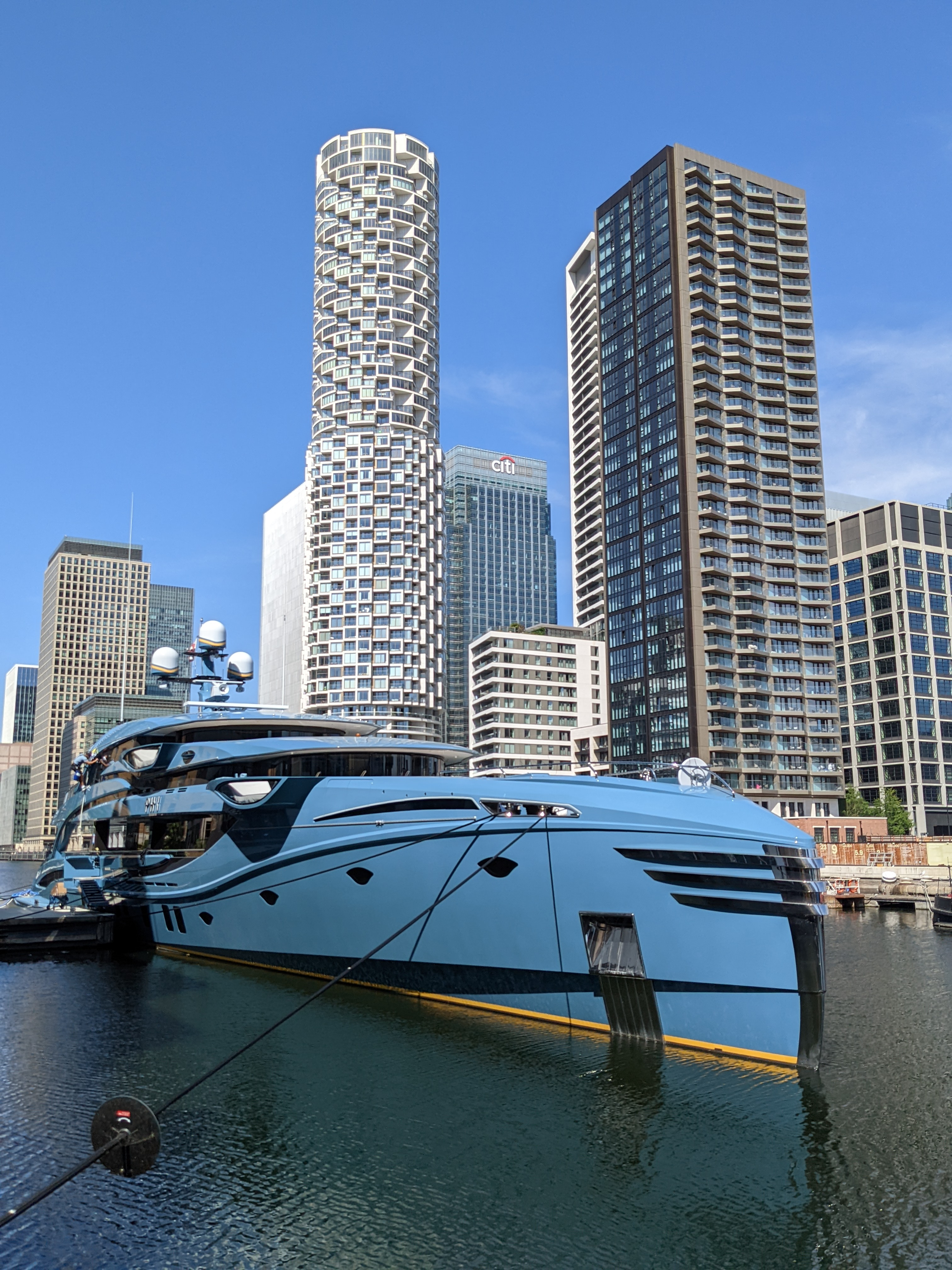
- PHI at Canary Wharf, London

History

Malta
- Name: PHI
- Owner: Sergei Naumenko
- Builder: Royal Huisman
- Cost: £38 million ($50 million)
- Launched: 2021
- Completed: 2021
- In service: 2021–2022
- Out of service: 2022 (impounded)
- Fate: Sanctioned by UK Government
- Status: Impounded

General characteristics
- Class & type: Lloyd's Register
- Type: Super yacht
- Tonnage: 499 GT
- Length: 58.5 m (192 ft)
- Beam: 9.73 m (31.9 ft)
- Propulsion: 2 ×MTU 12V 2000 M96L
- Speed: 22 knots (41 km/h) (maximum)
- Capacity: 12 passengers
- Crew: 11
- Notes: Aluminium hull & superstructure

PHI or Phi is a 58.5 m (192 ft) superyacht delivered by noted Dutch shipbuilders Royal Huisman, in 2021, costing £38 million ($50 million). Along with Phi itself, a support vessel, the PHI Phantom, was built by Alia Yachts at their yard in Antalya, Turkey, with her design mirroring the exterior style of Phi. Phi is registered to a company based in the Caribbean dual-island nation of Saint Kitts and Nevis, and sails under a Maltese flag.

The superyacht has been impounded by the UK Government, under United Kingdom sanctions in connection with the 2022 Russian invasion of Ukraine, since March 2022. Successive appeals to the UK High Court of Justice to have sanctions on PHI lifted have been unsuccessful.

Phi remains docked at Canary Wharf in London. The yacht has suffered significant deterioration during its prolonged detention, including hull degradation, lapsed insurance coverage, and the loss of its classification status.

== Design ==
Phi's exterior design, inspired by the cobra, was done by Cor D. Rover Design, the interior is by Lawson Robb. Phi has a 7-metre swimming pool, which can be filled with either seawater or freshwater. The floor of the pool's is manoeuvrable, allowing extra deck space to be created when required. Phi has a large wine cellar.

== Sanctions ==
Phi had arrived in London in December 2021 for a winter stopover, docking in Canary Wharf. On March 28, 2022, Phi was due to leave London for Malta, however before she was able to do this, UK authorities announced sanctions on her, and ordered the superyacht's immediate impounding. It was the first time that UK Government sanctions had been used on a ship. The sanctioning was on the instructions of then Secretary of State for Transport Grant Shapps.

On March 28, Shapps went to Phi's location in Canary Wharf, filming a video of himself for his TikTok account, and speaking to the assembled media. Shapps stated of Phi : "It's a yacht which belongs to a Russian oligarch, a friend of Putin". He added that Phi had been detained "indefinitely," and that (its sanctioning) sent "a clear and stark warning to Putin and his cronies."

The UK Department for Transport (DfT) worked alongside the UK's National Crime Agency and the Border Force Maritime Investigation Bureau to identify and detain Phi. They initially refused to name the superyacht's owner, stating that he is "a Russian businessman", and that its seizure was aimed at "putting pressure on rich Russians following the invasion of Ukraine." Phi was later revealed to be owned by Russian property developer Sergei Naumenko, who has not been sanctioned by the UK Government.

Naumenko initially requested a ministerial review of the sanctioning of Phi, when this was rejected he took his case to the High Court. In July 2023 in London, in the first High Court appeal against assets frozen since Russia's 2022 invasion of Ukraine, the court heard the appeal of Naumenko (represented as 'Dalston Projects') for Phi to be unsanctioned. Naumenko's lawyers argued that the confiscation of Phi was both "unlawful" and "disproportionate", that Naumenko was not in fact a "friend of Putin", as Shapps had claimed, that Naumenko himself was not under UK Government sanctions and that sanctions had been applied to Phi "improperly". Later in July, Sir Ross Cranston, sitting in retirement, delivered his judgment. Sir Ross stated in his judgment that Phi was lawfully detained because she is a "high value ship", and her owner was "connected with' Russia." Sir Ross accepted that Grant Shapps was wrong to describe Naumenko as a "friend of Putin", but said it was "excusable political hyperbole," and that "The Secretary of State is entitled to a broad margin of discretion in deciding that the detention power is to be exercised in pursuit of the government's foreign policy aims." Sir Ross dismissed Naumenko's other claims, as he ruled against him, noting in his judgment that a ruling in favour of Naumenko would have sent out a signal that the UK Government was "softening" its approach on sanctions, and have implications for the aircraft detained by the UK Government under sanctions.

Naumenko appealed the High Court judgment against him. His appeal was heard alongside that of sanctioned Russian businessman Eugene Shvidler at the UK Court of Appeal in January 2024. On February 27, the Court of Appeal delivered its judgment. Lord Justice Singh made criticisms of the High Court's ruling against Naumenko, and the conduct of then Transport Secretary Grant Shapps, stating of Shapps' statement of the time "It was not hyperbole; it was incorrect. There is hyperbole where a statement which is true is exaggerated, but the statement that was made about Mr Naumenko's connections with President Putin was not true. It ought not to have been said and it certainly should not have been taken into account when exercising a discretionary power." However, Lord Justice Singh ultimately ruled against Shvidler and Naumenko, stating that "sanctions often have to be severe and open-ended if they are to be effective".

On appeal to the UK Supreme Court, Lord Sales and Lady Rose giving the judgment of the Court (Note: Lord Leggatt dissented from the judgment in relation to the joined appeal brought by Eugene Shvidler, but concurred with Lord Sales and Lady Rose's judgment in relation to the appeal brought by Dalston Projects (the ultimate beneficial owners of the Phi).) dismissed the appeal and upheld the lawfulness of the detention direction. The Court held at §190 that the Phi was "an archetypal emblem of conspicuous consumption", and at §182 that the prevention of the income Mr Naumenko would earn through chartering the Phi would either make its way to the Russian economy or would increase Mr Naumenko's prestige within the circle of Russian society in which he moves, meant that the detention direction is rationally connected to the legitimate aim of deterring Russian aggression in Ukraine. Further, having concluded at §203 that there were no less intrusive means to achieve the desired outcome, the Court the considered if the detention direction struck a fair balance, holding at §§204-205 that:

"[…] The direction in relation to the Phi means that Mr Naumenko is impeded in the use of a trophy asset to advertise his wealth and in earning some income from chartering it out for use. It is not suggested that this would have any significant effect upon how he lives his life, which given his great wealth is not surprising. As Singh LJ put it (para 129), the direction "does not cause him individual hardship in his normal daily life".

Weighing these matters against each other, Sir Ross Cranston and the Court of Appeal had no hesitation in concluding that the direction in respect of the Phi struck a fair balance. Singh LJ described this as "straightforward": para 126. We agree."

Following the Supreme Court's dismissal of the appeal in July 2025, Captain Guy Booth announced plans to approach the European Court of Human Rights (ECHR) to challenge the detention. As of March 2026, this appeal to the ECHR remains pending.

== Deterioration and maintenance issues ==
As of March 2026, Phi remains docked at Canary Wharf in London under continuous detention. The yacht has suffered extensive deterioration during its prolonged impoundment. The vessel is reported to be out of class and has lost its protection and indemnity insurance coverage. Several critical onboard systems, including fire detection and suppression systems, have been shut down. Stray electric current has caused galvanic corrosion in the fuel and water tanks that form the hull sides. The yacht carries approximately 60,000 litres of diesel fuel that cannot be pumped out due to the movement restrictions.

Visible signs of deterioration include hull degradation and scaffolding erected around much of the superstructure to protect it from debris. Some of the yacht's windows have been whitewashed to protect the interior. According to Captain Guy Booth, the yacht has experienced 18 attempted intrusions during its detention.

The sanctions regime prohibits moving the yacht, which has the effect of preventing significant maintenance work that would normally be performed. Yacht brokers note that vessels typically require being taken out of the water annually for maintenance, with engines, water systems, fuels, and lubricants needing to run continuously. Phi is part of a broader trend affecting detained Russian-linked yachts across Europe. According to yacht brokerage Cecil Wright, 15 impounded Russian-linked yachts have collectively lost approximately €580 million in value, declining from an estimated worth of €3.5 billion if properly maintained to around €2.9 billion.

Phi remains the only instance of UK Government sanctions being used on a ship. Naumenko is responsible for the vessel's maintenance costs but is not allowed to access or use Phi, which remains his property under UK law.

== See also ==
- Le Grand Bleu (yacht)
- List of motor yachts by length
