= ICON Yachts =

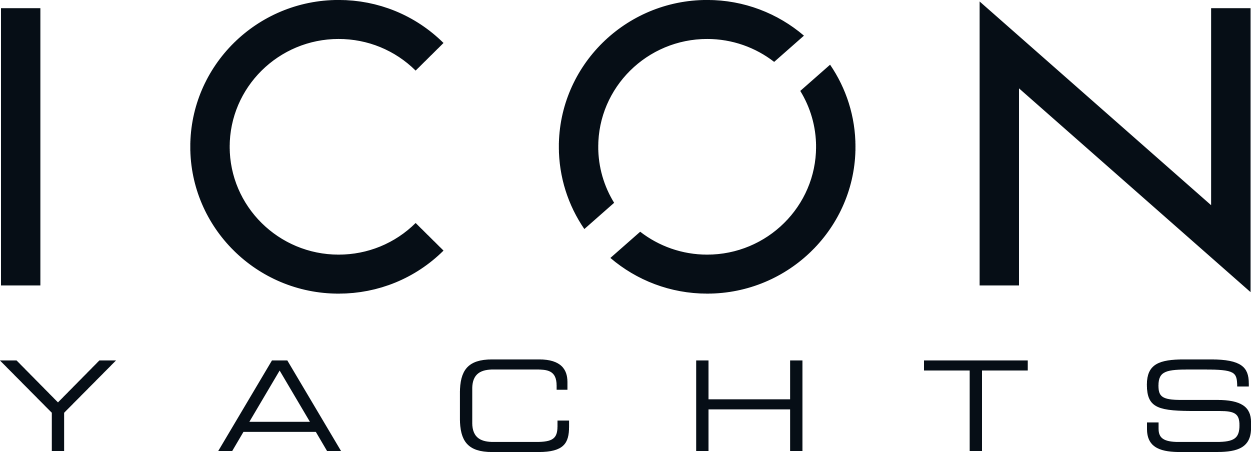
- Industry: Shipbuilding
- Founded: 2005
- Headquarters: Harlingen, Netherlands
- Key people: Tony Gale (CEO)
- Products: Superyachts
- Services: Conversions, refits and new builds
- Owner: Micca Ferrero
- Website: www.iconyachts.eu

ICON Yachts is a Dutch shipbuilding company headquartered in Harlingen, Netherlands.

ICON Yachts is a highly specialized shipyard for yacht conversion and refit projects, which has established a leading position in the sector of Explorer yachts and purpose vessels.

Since 2021, Mr. Micca Ferrero, a prominent Swiss businessman, has owned the ICON Yachts group.

== The shipyard ==
The shipyard is located outside the historic port of Harlingen and it has unrestricted open-water access from locks and bridges. The yard facilities include a 150 x 33m covered and heated dry dock with a 7.5m maximum draft and a 90m long floating dock. ICON Yachts strategic site has been crucial in defining the company's specialization in conversions and refits.

Lloyd's Register awarded ICON Yachts ISO 9001 and ISO 14001 certifications. Thus, since 2021, the shipyard uses 100% green energy and it was the first Dutch shipbuilding company to be awarded with the ISO 14001.

== History ==
ICON Yachts was founded in late 2005 by the investor Ton van Dam and Alex Shnaider, former F1 team owner and real estate investor. The founders were shortly after joined by business partners, who helped further the shipyard's growth.

In its early years, ICON Yachts launched several superyachts. In 2009, the 67.50 m (221.5 ft) superyacht MY ICON (now sold and re-named MY LOON) was launched in collaboration with the renowned British Yacht Designers Redman Whiteley Dixon, who carried out her exterior design. Afterward, and using the same proven hull platform, ICON Yachts created MY BATON ROUGE, MY PARTY GIRL (now sold and re-named MY NORA), then later a smaller yacht MY BASMALINA II

In 2015, ICON Yachts launched MY LEGEND (77m), one of the shipyard’s greatest refit works. The original vessel, an ice-breaking tug named MV GIANT, underwent an extensive refit/conversion that was conducted at the Dutch shipyard in a short amount of time. Upon completion, the vessel was renamed MY LEGEND and she is now one of the first ice-capable yachts with Lloyds 1A Ice Class.

In August 2017, ICON Yachts signed a contract to convert the commercial motor vessel Sanaborg, a 68m icebreaker built by Koninklijke Niestern Sander, into a luxury superyacht. In 2020, in association with the UK design team RWD, ICON launched RAGNAR (68m), an eye-catcher Explorer Yacht that turned into the brand’s flagship piece. In 2024 the yacht changed ownership to a US client and is re-named MY Q.

Since 2020, Tony Gale has headed the company, as CEO. In July 2021 Swiss businessman Micca Ferrero became sole shareholder and operates as the ‘face of’ ICON Yachts, playing a key role in the company as co-Director.

The shipyard is currently working on a massive 70-meter conversion project, Project MASTER, to create a luxury explorer yacht that includes a collaboration with the world-renowned designer and naval architect Espen Øino, who is responsible for the superyacht's new appearances.

== List of yachts built/rebuilt ==
Biggest by both length and volume upon completion
Biggest by length yacht upon completion
Biggest by volume upon completion

Year	Size		Name		Note	Reference
Year	Length at launch	Volume at launch	Original	Current (Note: As of 27 October 2022)	Note	Reference
2009	62.50 m (205 ft)	1,251 GT	ICON	Loon	In 2014 she was lengthened with 5 metres to an overall length of 67.50 m (221 ft).	
2010	62.50 m (205 ft)	1,423 GT	Baton Rouge			
2011	41.60 m (136 ft)	347 GT	Basmalina II			
2012	62.50 m (205 ft)	1,266 GT	Maidelle	Party Girl		
1974 / 2016	73.50 m (241 ft) / 77.40 m (254 ft)	2,407 GT	Dimant	Legend	Originally built in 1974 by IHC Verschure as an Icebreaker. She was transformed into an expedition yacht by Giant Limited in Mexico. In 2014 she started with a rebuild at ICON Yachts, which took over two years to be completed. Ex names: Giant I, Giant, Gigant, and Dimant	
2012 / 2020	68.20 m (224 ft)	1,520 GT / 2,272 GT	Sanaborg	Ragnar	Originally built in 2012 by Koninklijke Niestern Sander as an Icebreaking Multipurpose Support & Supply Vessel. In 2020 ICON Yachts finished a two year conversion. Ex name: Sanaborg	

=== Rebuilts ===
Name	Refit year	Builder
MY Basmalina II (43m)	2011	ICON Yachts
MY C2 (78m)	2011	Abeking & Rasmussen
MY Slipstream (61m)	2011	CMN
SY ICON (63m)	2011	ICON Yachts
SY EOS (92m)	2012	Lurssen
Rahil (48m)	2012	BVB
MY Seven Sins (52m)	2012	Heesen
MY Meridian (63m)	2013	ICON Yachts
SY Germania Nova (55m)	2013/2014	FNM
MY Princess Too (48m)	2013/2014	Feadship
MY Legend (77.4m)	2014/2015	IHC Verschuure
MY Ilona (74m)	2016	Amels
MY Seahorse (52m)	2016	Amels
MY Sherakhan (70m)	2016/2017	Vuijk Scheepswerven
MY Virginian (62m)	2017	Feadship
MY Game Changer (72m)	2020	Damen

=== Under construction ===
Length overall in meters	Name	Reference
70 m (230 ft)	Project Master	
70 m (230 ft)	Project UFO	

== See also ==
- List of motor yachts by length
- MY Icon
- MY Baton Rouge
- MY Party Girl
- RAGNAR
