= Ragnar (yacht) =

Ship

History

Netherlands
- Name: Sanaborg
- Operator: Wagenborg Shipping
- Builder: Koninklijke Niestern Sander
- Launched: 29 March 2012
- Commissioned: July 2012
- Decommissioned: 2017
- Out of service: 2015
- Fate: Sold to ICON Yachts for conversion

General characteristics before conversion
- Class & type: Ice Breaking Multipurpose Support Vessels
- Tonnage: 1,520 GT
- Length: 68.20 m (223.8 ft)
- Beam: 14 m (46 ft)
- Draught: 2.50 m (8.2 ft)
- Propulsion: Twin 1,950hp diesel engines
- Capacity: 5 passengers
- Crew: 8

Malta
- Name: Ragnar
- Owner: Vladimir Strzhalkovsky
- Builder: ICON Yachts
- Launched: 24 January 2020
- Acquired: 2017
- In service: 2020
- Home port: Valletta, Malta
- Identification: IMO number: 9621522; MMSI number: 215598000; Callsign: 9HA5201
- Status: In active service

General characteristics after conversion
- Class & type: Conversion motor yacht
- Tonnage: 2,272 GT
- Length: 62.50 m (205.1 ft)
- Beam: 14 m (46 ft)
- Draught: 3.15 m (10.3 ft)
- Propulsion: Twin 2,682hp Caterpillar (3516C-HD) diesel engines
- Speed: 10 knots (19 km/h) (maximum); 8 knots (15 km/h) (cruising)
- Range: 4,800 nmi (8,900 km) at 8 knots (15 km/h)
- Capacity: 12 guests
- Crew: 17

The 68.20 m (223.8 ft) superyacht Ragnar was launched by ICON Yachts at their yard in Harlingen and delivered later that same year to Russian millionaire Vladimir Strzhalkovsky.

== History ==
The Yacht Ragnar started out as an offshore supply vessel named Sanaborg for Wagenborg Shipping built in 2012 by Koninklijke Niestern Sander at their yard in Farmsum.

=== Conversion ===
In 2017 Sanneborg was acquired by ICON Yachts as a starting point for the conversion to what later would become the yacht Ragnar after being laid up in 2015. Ragnar was launched 24 January 2020 and delivered later that year.

=== 2022 citizen's arrest ===
Following the 2022 Russian invasion of Ukraine, the yacht was boarded on 23 February 2022 for an inspection by the Norwegian authorities because the owner has ties to the Kremlin. Ragnar was allowed to leave but because the owner is Russian, local fuel - and supply companies refused to sell to the yacht causing her to be stuck in Narvik for almost 2 months. The Norwegian government had to order a different company to deliver fuel so she could leave.

== Design ==
Her length is 68.20 m (223.8 ft), beam is 14 m (46 ft) and she has a draught of 2.50 m (8.2 ft) with a volume of 1,520 GT. After the redesign by RWD the draught changed to 3.15 m (10.3 ft) with a new volume of 2,272 GT. The hull and the existing superstructure were built out of steel. The new parts of the superstructure that were added during the conversion were also made out of steel but with teak decks. The yacht is classed by Bureau Veritas and flagged in Malta.

=== Amenities ===
Zero speed stabilizers, gym, air conditioning, BBQ, spa room, sauna, jacuzzi. There is also a commercial graded helicopter landing pad on the upperdeck.

==== Tenders ====
- Two 8 m (26 ft) tenders
- Two 6 m (20 ft) RHIBs

==== Recreational toys ====
U-Boat Worx C-Explorer 3, Ripsaw EV2, 4x Ribeye jet-skis, 4x snowmobiles, 4x amphibious ATV's.

=== Performance ===
She is powered by twin 2,682 hp Caterpillar (3516C-HD) diesel engines. The engines power two propellers, which in turn propel the ship to a top speed of 10 knots (19 km/h). At a cruising speed of 8 knots (15 km/h), her maximum range is 4,800 nmi (8,900 km).

== See also ==
- MY Legend
- Yachts impacted by international sanctions following the Russian invasion of Ukraine
