= Solaris (yacht) =

2021 megayacht

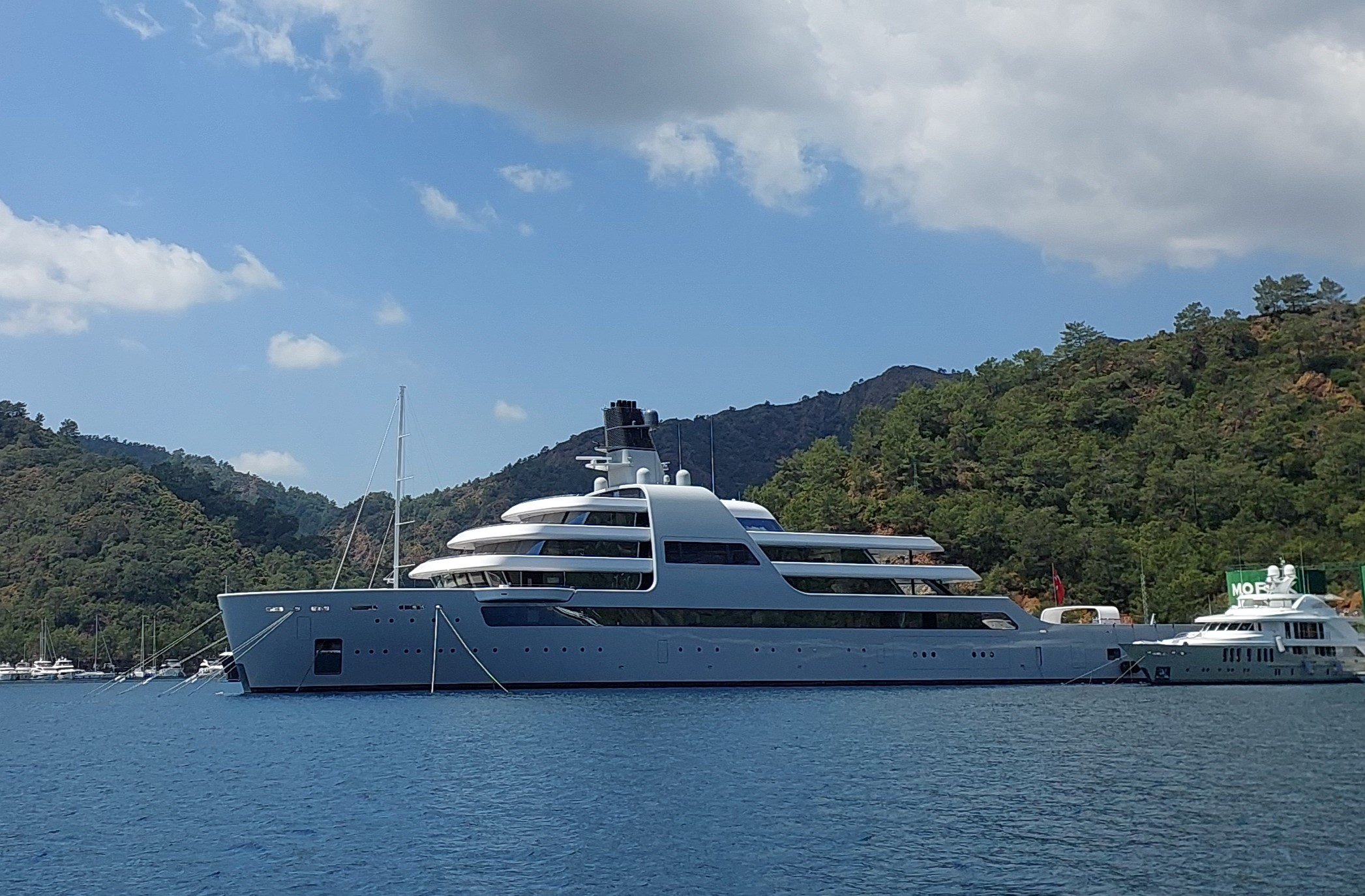
- MY Solaris docked at Port Azure Marina in Göcek, Turkey, April 2025

History

Bermuda
- Name: Solaris
- Owner: Roman Abramovich
- Builder: Lloyd Werft
- Identification: IMO number: 9819820; Call sign: ZCEX8; MMSI number: 310792000

General characteristics
- Type: Motor yacht
- Tonnage: 11,247 GT
- Length: 458 ft 4 in (139.70 m)
- Beam: 70 ft 0.55 in (21.3 m)
- Draft: 19 ft 6.25 in (5.9500 m)
- Installed power: 9,000 kW (12,069 hp)
- Propulsion: 2 x 4,500 kW (6,035 hp) ABB Azipod CO1400L, 2 x Bow Thrusters

Solaris is a 139.7-metre (458 ft) yacht built in 2021 for Russian and Israeli business oligarch Roman Abramovich by Lloyd Werft.

== Sanctions ==
As a result of the 2022 Russian invasion of Ukraine, Roman Abramovich is subject to international sanctions which have seen seizures of yachts owned by those believed to have links to the Kremlin. Since 2022 both Solaris and Abramovich's flagship motor yacht Eclipse have been moved to countries that decline to impose the sanctions, and as of 2023 have evaded seizure.

Media reported the yacht, which was in Barcelona for repairs, put to sea on March 8, 2022, as yacht seizures began to escalate. She was in port at Tivat, Montenegro, March 12–14, then was determined to be in Turkish waters. Between March 21 and April 3, she was reported to have docked at Bodrum in Turkey, where the ship would not be subject to the sanctions. She was moved to another Turkish port around May 5. Her AIS position may be tracked at MarineTraffic's website.

== See also ==
- List of motor yachts by length
