= United Kingdom government sanctions =

Sanctions imposed by the government of the United Kingdom against countries, individuals, and organisations that the UK Government rules violate the interests, or are opposed to the values of the United Kingdom. The United Kingdom refers to those sanctioned as 'designated', countries, organisations, or individuals. Sanctions take the form of asset freezes, preventing the designated country, person, or organisation from accessing their finances in the United Kingdom, travel bans, preventing the designated person from entering the United Kingdom, and transport sanctions. Transport sanctions prevent the transport the designated person owns or controls from entering UK territory.

When imposed on countries, sanctions are used with the intent of damaging that country's economy in response to unfavourable policy or decisions. United Kingdom sanctions on countries are imposed either in response to that country imposing sanctions on the United Kingdom, or to assert pressure on a country to change its actions to align with the politics and values of the United Kingdom. When United Kingdom sanctions are applied to an organisation, they are done so with the aim of asserting pressure on that organisation to change its actions to align with the politics and values of the United Kingdom. United Kingdom sanctions on individuals are usually imposed on non-British citizens due to their association with regimes, or organisations, which the United Kingdom is opposed to, or prohibited terrorist organisations.

In July 2022, British journalist Graham Phillips became the first British citizen holding no other citizenship to be added to the UK Government sanctions list. Phillips was added to the list because his work "supports and promotes actions and policies which destabilise Ukraine and undermine or threaten the territorial integrity, sovereignty, or independence of Ukraine".

Despite some criticisms of their effectiveness, sanctions have become for the United Kingdom, as many countries across the world, a key part of government strategy in pursuing foreign policy goals. The UK Government has a 100% record of defending sanctions appeals in the UK Court system.

== History ==
=== 19th century ===
The UK, along with other nations, notably the United States, has deployed embargoes, or sanctions, for centuries. At the time of the Napoleonic Wars at the start of the 19th century, the United Kingdom banned all trade between France, her allies, and the Americas. This was in response to France prohibiting all neutral trade with the United Kingdom, in 1806.

=== 20th century ===
The First World War led to the League of Nations being created, with Article 16 of the League of Nations Charter requiring all members to sever all trade or financial relations with "belligerent countries" - that is countries which had gone to war rather than resolve disputes peacefully. The belief was that sanctions could deter wars and also how leaders of a nation treated their own citizens. Sometimes the threat of imposing sanctions worked, however some countries simply ignored them and continued as before. When Italy attacked Ethiopia in 1935, 52 counties imposed sanctions on Italy, including the UK. The sanctions on Italy affected armaments, financial instruments, the import of all goods from Italy and the export of some specified goods to Italy. However the sanctions only lasted 8 months, and were ineffective.

With the formation of the United Nations following the Second World War, the deployment of sanctions as a political tool was reintroduced, this time with the US involved. The UN did not interfere with individual countries imposing their own sanctions on any country, however when the UN imposed sanctions, just 5 times between 1946 and 1990, against North Korea, South Africa, Portugal, Rhodesia and Iraq, the UN expected all nations to back the sanctions. The UK imposed its own, non-UN sanctions against Iran 1951–53, Egypt in 1956, Uganda 1972-79 and Somalia in 1988. In the second part of the 20th century, sanctions generally became more prominent as an economic tool.

=== 21st century ===
In modern times, the UK Government both issues its own stand-alone sanctions, and has also endorsed sanctions issued by other countries in acts of multi-national cooperation. In the 21st century, UK Government sanctions have targeted individuals or companies in response to high-profile incidents, such as the 2006 murder of Alexander Litvinenko. In 2019, the UK, along with the European Union, imposed sanctions on those suspected to be involved in the 2018 Poisoning of Sergei and Yulia Skripal. In July 2020, the UK announced the first sanctions under a new global human rights regime, "designed to target those who have been involved in some of the gravest human rights violations and abuses around the world". Forty-nine individuals and organisations were designated for sanctions, with sanctions preventing them from entering the country, channelling money through UK banks, or profiting from the UK economy.

As of 2024, UK Sanctions are passed according to the 2018 Act.

The 2018 Act was passed after the UK invoked article 50 of the Treaty on European Union, to begin the process of withdrawal from the EU. It makes provision to enable sanctions to be imposed where appropriate for purposes that include international peace and security and furthering foreign policy objectives (see the long title to the Act). The explanatory notes explain that these were matters that were (at the time that the Act was passed) dealt with through EU law, but that as a result of withdrawal from the EU it was necessary to create a new legislative framework....

UK sanctions have been targeted at a wide range of individuals, and companies. Following the 2022 Russian invasion of Ukraine, the UK began to introduce a series of packages of sanctions targeted at Russian individuals, and companies. On 10 March 2022, Russian oligarch and then owner of Chelsea, Roman Abramovich was sanctioned by the UK as part of a group of seven Russian oligarchs. Abramovich, who has Russian, Israeli and Portuguese citizenship, had his UK assets frozen and a travel ban was put in place. The British government said the sanctions were in response to Abramovich's alleged ties to the Kremlin and said the companies Abramovich controls could be producing steel used in tanks deployed offensively by Russia in Ukraine. Abramovich denied that he has close ties to Vladimir Putin and the Kremlin. UK Government sanctions forced Abramovich to sell his football club, Chelsea, which he had owned for 19 years.

In March 2022, then Chancellor Rishi Sunak stated that sanctions on Russia "are not cost free" for British people and he cannot completely protect them "from difficult times ahead". Sunak attributed anti-Russia sanctions for contributing to the UK cost of living crisis. In May 2023 at the annual G7 summit, in Tokyo, UK Prime Minister Rishi Sunak stepped up sanctions on Russia, banning the import of Russian diamonds, along with Russian-origin copper, aluminium and nickel, as he redoubled UK support for Ukraine. The UK also sanctioned a further 86 Russian individuals and companies. Sunak stated: "Sanctions imposed on Russia by the UK and G7 partners are having a clear and progressive impact in downgrading Putin's war effort."

From the 1990s, until 2021, the USA had issued two-thirds of global sanctions, however following the 2022 Russian invasion of Ukraine, other countries, notably the United Kingdom, have become more active issuers of sanctions. As of 2024, the UK has sanctioned more than 1,600 individuals and frozen over 18 billion pounds ($22.8 billion) in assets. The list of those sanctioned, and the sanctions imposed, by the UK Government is available online, on the UK Government website.

=== Sanction implementation, and removal from sanctions list ===
UK Government sanctions are often issued without notice given to the designated country, organisation, or individual. Sanctions are issued directly by the UK Government, with no involvement of the UK Judicial system. They do not represent a criminal charge. Sanctions are not connected to stripping of the British passport. The sanctioned entity, or person, can appeal their designation by ministerial review, and if that is unsuccessful, in the High Court of Justice. Several individuals have been removed from the UK Government sanctions list after ministerial review, however as of 2024, no High Court appeal against sanctions has been successful.

So far the government has made only vague statements about the possibility of an “offramp” for the oligarchs and recently lifted sanctions against Oleg Tinkov, but more clarity is needed about delisting policy to ensure sanctions really incentivise behaviour change.(Spotlight on Corruption)

UK Government sanctions are described by the UK Government as 'temporary and reversible'. There is no fixed timeframe applied to sanctions. If the country, organisation or individual is not removed from the sanctions list as a result of appeal, they will be removed when the UK Government decides.

==== Sanction enforcement, licences ====
Established in 2016, the Office for Financial Sanctions Implementation (OFSI), a department of the UK Treasury, has a number of responsibilities, including helping to ensure that financial sanctions are properly understood, implemented and enforced. The detection and investigation of potential breaches. OFSI can impose financial sanctions, such as asset freezing and the restriction of financial services against people or entities.

Designated individuals or companies are able to apply to OFSI for 'licences', which may release some of their funds for 'basic needs'. A licence was granted to Roman Abramovich so he could sell Chelsea, with Abramovich and the UK Government apparently signing a statement in March 2022 that proceeds from the sale be used “for the benefit of all victims of the war in Ukraine”. In 2023, however the UK Government insisted that the funds, around £2.5 billion, be used for “exclusively humanitarian purposes in Ukraine”, leading to Abramovich's representatives accusing them of changing the terms of the deal, which had not stipulated on the nationality of 'victims of the war'. The situation is currently at a stalemate, with the funds in a frozen bank account belonging to Abramovich's company Fordstam.

==== High Court appeals against UK sanctions ====
In July 2023, in the first High Court appeal against assets frozen since Russia's 2022 invasion of Ukraine, the court ruled against the appeal to release the superyacht Phi to its owner, Russian businessman Sergei Naumenko. “Phi was lawfully detained because she is a high value ship, and her owner was 'connected with' Russia,” said Judge Ross Cranston during a written ruling. The judge accepted that Grant Shapps was wrong to describe Naumenko as a friend of Putin, but said it was "excusable political hyperbole.” Naumenko appealed the judgment against him.

In August 2023, in the first case of sanctions on an individual being challenged, the High Court ruled against businessman Eugene Shvidler. Shvidler is Russian-born, with British and American citizenship. His lawyers argued in his legal challenge to the sanctions in the High Court, that his rights under the European Convention on Human Rights had been breached, and that sanctions caused "disproportionate hardship" and "discriminated against him as a Russian-born person". In August 2023, the challenge was rejected by the court, with judge Neil Garnham stating “Whilst the effects of designation are serious, and the claimant and his family have been subjected to enormous inconvenience and no little financial loss, they do not threaten his life or liberty." Shvidler appealed the High Court ruling against him.

“(Sanctions are) an area where the courts have to defer to the judgment of the secretary of state. The relative benefits, disadvantages and effectiveness of different measures taken in pursuit of foreign policy objectives is not one on which the court can second-guess the Foreign Office.” (Justice Neil Garnham)

In the case of Graham Phillips, UK Government sanctions were criticised as a violation of freedom of speech. Phillips' case was positioned as 'Freedom of expression versus Russia sanctions'. In court, Phillips' lawyers argued that Phillips was being unfairly punished by 'Orwellian' sanctions without crime by the UK State, however Justice Johnson in his January 2024 ruling stated that the sanctions were a 'proportionate interference with Phillips' human rights' in the 'legitimate aim of protecting the UK's national security'.

(Mr Phillips) decided to set his face against an overwhelming international consensus, to align himself with Russia’s invasion of Ukraine, to travel to the frontline, and to help Russia fight its propaganda war. He has not shown any journalistic responsibility or ethics.

==== Court of Appeal ====
Shvidler and Naumenko's appeals against the High Court rulings against them were heard alongside each other in January 2024 at the UK Court of Appeal. They were the first cases to reach the UK Court of Appeal. On 27 February, the Court of Appeal delivered its judgment, ruling against Shvidler and Naumenko. Alexa Magee, a legal researcher at 'Spotlight on Corruption', stated that the UK Government victory had given it "the green light to pursue sanctions with even greater ambition".

=== Criticism of sanctions ===
Since their inception, there has been ongoing debate about the actual effectiveness of sanctions, and criticisms of sanctioning as a policy. Although Justice Garnham ruled against him in his High Court judgment, the Shvidler case led to a call for an independent review of the UK sanctions regime.

"his (Shvidler's) evidence painted a picture of an overstretched team in the Office of Financial Sanctions Implementation (OFSI) tasked with responding to licence applications seeking exemptions from sanctions. He also raised legitimate questions about what practical steps he and other designated persons need to take to come off the sanctions list." (Spotlight on Corruption)

British barrister Marina Wheeler wrote after the Phillips judgment that using sanctions to "slow the spread of disinformation" was "not without risks" and there were situations where "it may be less easy to distinguish between legitimate political dissent – worthy of protection – and illegitimate propaganda." British journalist Peter Hitchens has been strongly critical of the UK Government in their sanctioning of Phillips, viewing it as punishment of a British citizen without any judicial procedure. Hitchens has described Phillips' fight against sanctions as "Liberty fighting tyranny", describing Phillips as a "prisoner of the (UK) state", and comparing the treatment of Phillips with that of Julian Assange.

== See also ==
- European Union sanctions
- United States sanctions
- International sanctions during the Russian invasion of Ukraine
- International sanctions during the Russo-Ukrainian War
- List of people banned from entering the United Kingdom
