= Russian destroyer Severomorsk =

Udaloy-class destroyer of the Russian Navy

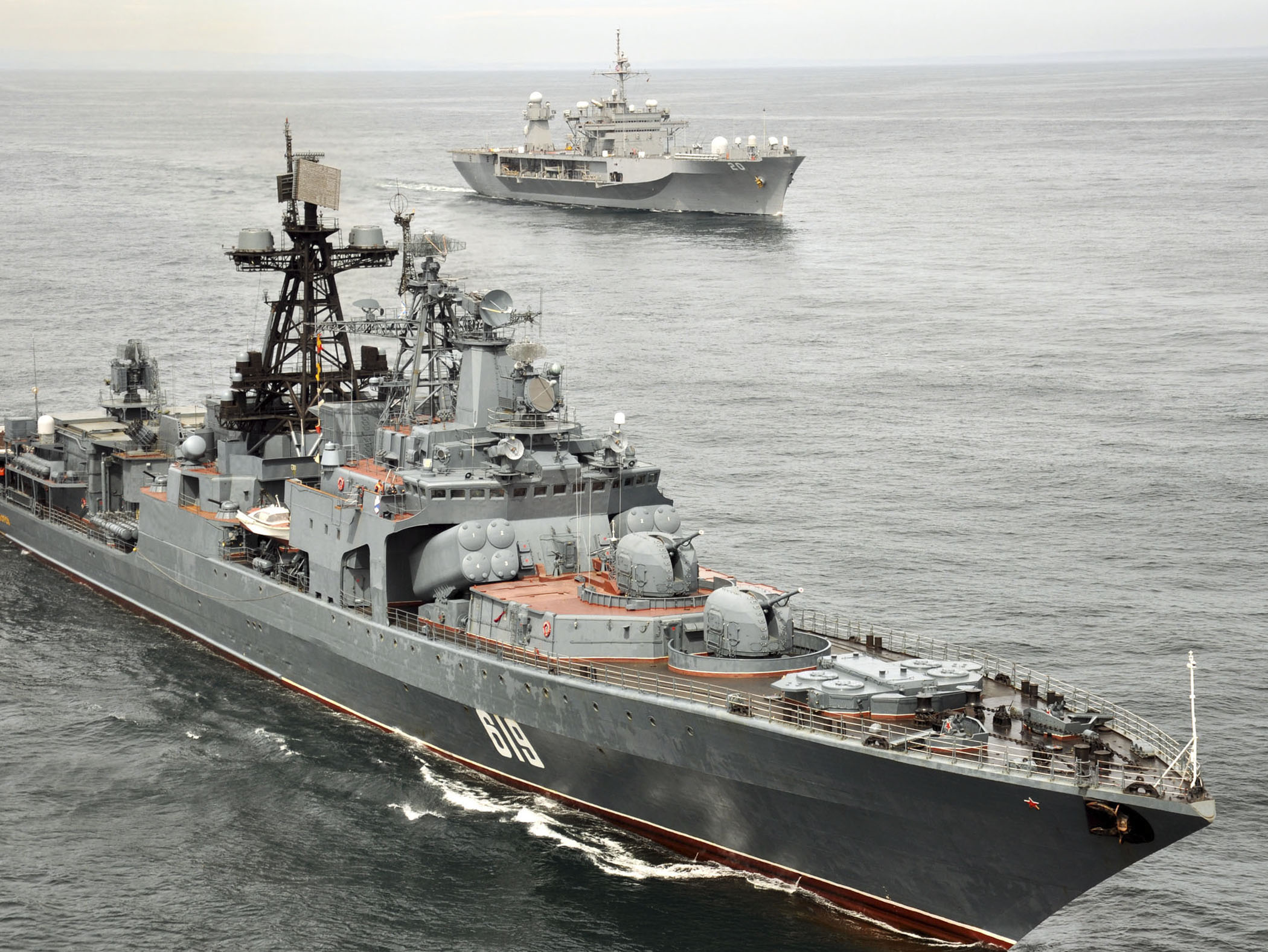
- Severomorsk underway with USS Mount Whitney on 19 July 2010

History

Russia
- Name: Severomorsk; (Северомо́рск)
- Namesake: Severomorsk
- Builder: Severnaya Verf, Saint Petersburg
- Laid down: 12 June 1984
- Launched: 24 December 1985
- Commissioned: 30 December 1987
- Home port: Severomorsk
- Identification: Pennant number: 487, 619, 684
- Status: Active

General characteristics
- Class & type: Udaloy-class destroyer
- Displacement: 6,930 tons standard, 7,570 tons full load
- Length: 163 m (534 ft 9 in)
- Beam: 19.3 m (63 ft 4 in)
- Draught: 6.2 m (20 ft 4 in)
- Propulsion: 2 shaft COGAG, 2 × D090 6.7 MW and 2 × DT59 16.7 gas turbines, 120,000 hp 89.456 MW
- Speed: 35 knots (65 km/h; 40 mph)
- Range: 10,500 nmi (19,400 km; 12,100 mi) at 14 knots (26 km/h; 16 mph)
- Complement: 300
- Sensors & processing systems: Radar: MR-760MA Fregat-MA/Top Plate 3-D air search radar and MR-320M Topaz-V/Strut Pair air/surface search radar; Sonar: Horse Tail LF VDS sonar and Horse Jaw bow mounted LF sonar; Fire control: 2 MR-360 Podkat/Cross Sword SA-N-9 SAM control, 2 3P37/Hot Flash SA-N-11 SAM control, Garpun-BAL SSM targeting
- Electronic warfare & decoys: Bell Squat jammer, Bell Shroud intercept, Bell Crown intercept, 2 × PK-2 decoy RL
- Armament: Guns: 2 × 1 21KM AA guns; 4 × 6 30 mm AK-630 CIWS; 2 × 1 AK-100 100 mm naval guns; Missiles; 8 (2 × 4) SS-N-14 'Silex' anti-submarine/anti-ship missiles; 64 (8 × 8) VLS cells for SA-N-9 'Gauntlet' surface-to-air missiles; Anti-submarine: 2 × 4 533 mm torpedo tubes for Type 53 or Type 65 torpedoes; 2 × 12 RBU-6000 anti-submarine rocket launchers; 2 × 6 RBU-1000 anti-submarine rocket launchers
- Aircraft carried: 2× Ka-27 series helicopter
- Aviation facilities: Helipad and hangar

Severomorsk is a Udaloy-class destroyer. The ship entered service with the Soviet Navy in 1987 and after the breakup of the Soviet Union, became part of the Russian Navy.

== Development and design ==
Project 1155 dates to the 1970s when it was concluded that it was too costly to build large-displacement, multi-role combatants. The concept of a specialized surface ship was developed by Soviet designers.

They are 156 metres (511 ft 10 in) in length, 17.3 metres (56 ft 9 in) in beam and 6.5 metres (21 ft 4 in) in draught.

== Construction and career ==
Severomorsk was laid down on 12 June 1984 and launched on 24 December 1985 by Severnaya Verf in Saint Petersburg. She was commissioned on 30 December 1987.

On 4 October 2017, a detachment of ships led by Severomorsk arrived at the main base of the Northern Fleet, Severomorsk, after successfully completing exercises in the Arctic Ocean.

Beginning on 5 July 2018, the destroyer began a long voyage, visiting ports in Algeria, Victoria, Australia, Pemba and Antsiranana. Severomorsk took part in the Russian-Japanese naval anti-piracy exercises in the Gulf of Aden and then in Russian-Pakistani exercises on anti-piracy activities Arabian Monsoon 2018.

On 8 January 2019, the ship passed the Dardanelles and entered the Sea of Marmara. On 10 January, the ship arrived at Sevastopol to restore technical readiness, after which it continued a long sea voyage. At the beginning of April, Severomorsk performed tasks in the Mediterranean. In mid-2019 she participated in the naval parade in Saint Petersburg.

In mid-2020 Severomorsk was deployed to the Bering Sea via the Northern sea route. Before returning to her homeport at Severomorsk, in November the ship sailed just outside of British territorial waters in the Moray Firth alongside the tanker Sergey Osipov.

In January 2021, she entered the Barents Sea for naval artillery drills. She has remained active in the period since and in January 2026 was reported escorting two sanctioned cargo vessels in the aftermath of the American seizure of another Russian flagged vessel earlier in the month. Since beginning of May 2026, the ship is stationed at sea position near the German Baltic Sea island of Fehmarn. On 29 June 2026 Severomorsk was sighted in the Kattegat leaving the Baltic Sea, escorting salvage vessel Voevoda and Vladimir Putin's alleged private yacht Graceful.

Severomorsk was regularly operating in the Baltic in 2026 leading to suggestions that she had replaced the decommissioned destroyer Nastoychivy as the Baltic Fleet flagship. However, this had not been officially confirmed.

== Gallery ==
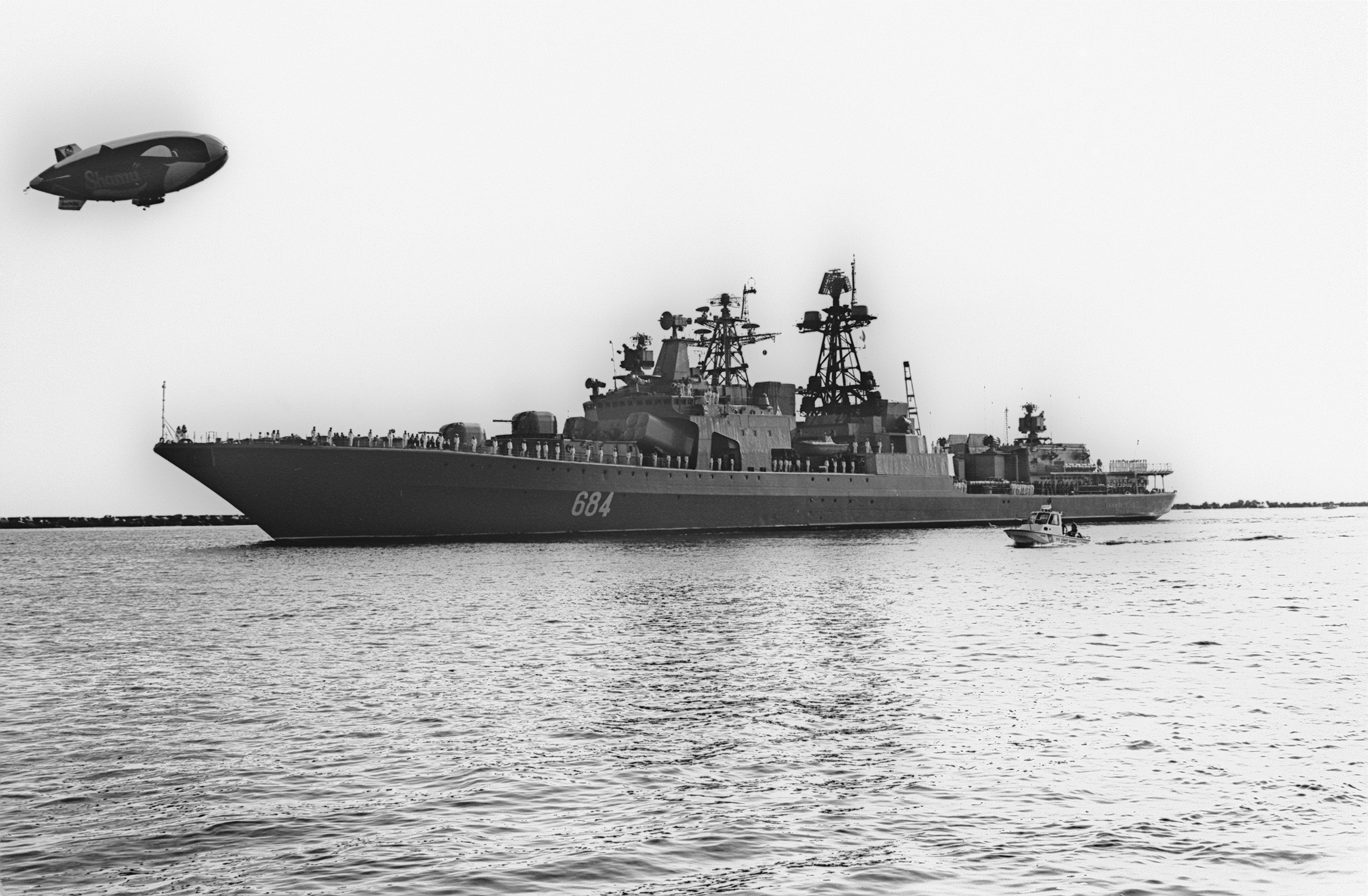
Severomorsk anchored on 7 January 1991.

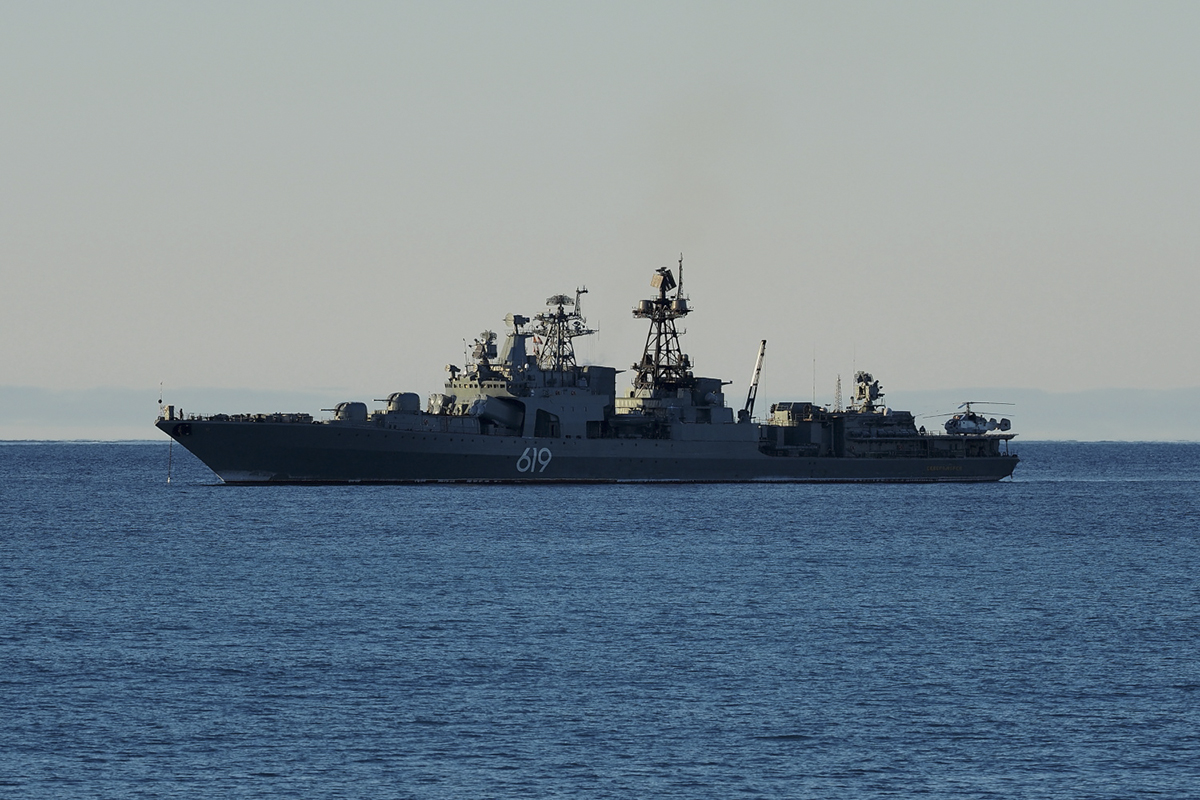
Severomorsk underway on 28 September 2017.

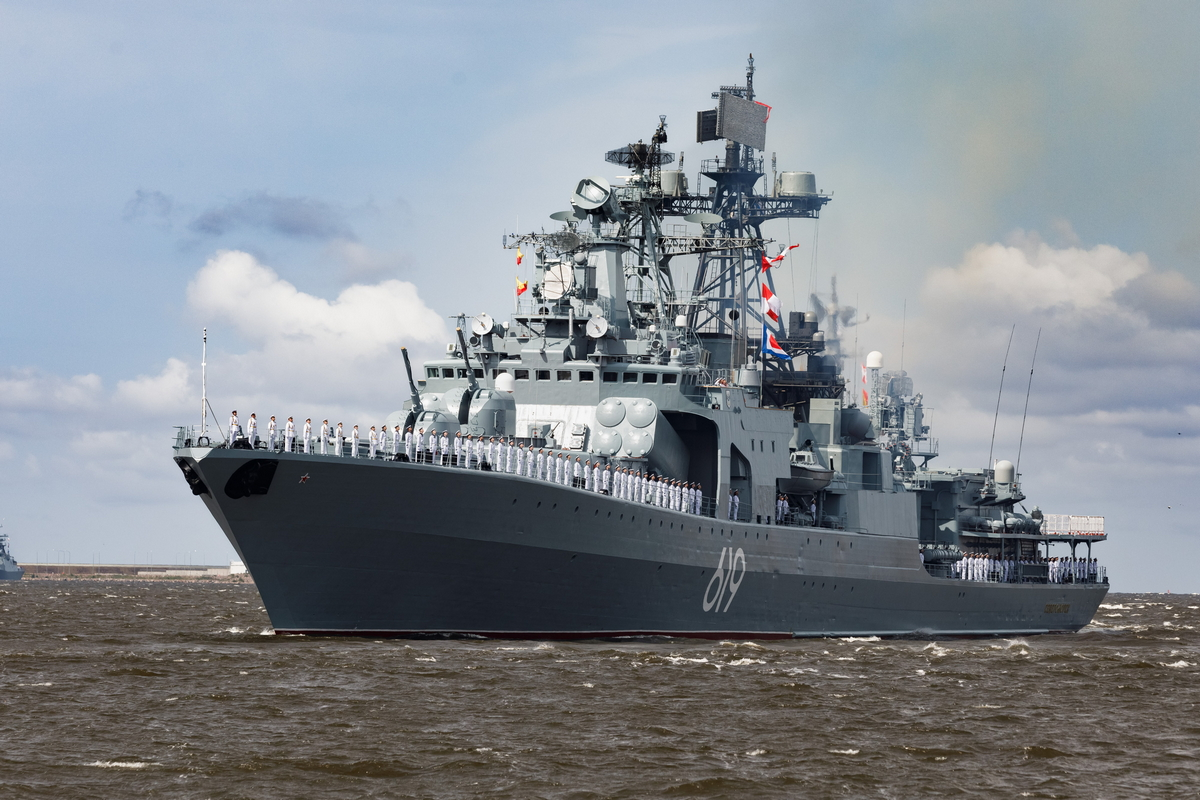
Severomorsk during the Russian Navy Day Parade in 2023.
