= Eugene Shvidler =

Russian oligarch (born 1964)

- Born: Evgeny Markovich Shvidler; 23 March 1964 (age 62); Ufa, Russian SFSR, Soviet Union (now Russia)
- Citizenship: British, American, French
- Education: Gubkin Institute of Petrochemicals and Natural Gas; Fordham University
- Spouse: Zara Shvidler (now divorced)
- Children: 5

Evgeny Markovich Shvidler (Russian: Евгений Маркович Швидлер; born 23 March 1964), known in English as Eugene Shvidler, is a Soviet-born billionaire businessman, and winemaker.

Shvidler was sanctioned by the UK Government in March 2022 in the wake of the Russian invasion of Ukraine and he remains under United Kingdom sanctions. Shvidler holds dual British and American citizenship. In August 2023, the UK High Court rejected Shvidler's application for his being sanctioned to be reviewed. In February 2024, Shvidler's appeal to the UK Court of Appeal was rejected.

As of April 2014, Shvidler's wealth is estimated at $1.6 billion, although it is unclear how much of this is sanctioned.

== Early life ==
Shvidler was born in Ufa, Russian SFSR, Soviet Union (now Russia). His place of birth has sometimes been incorrectly listed as Moscow. Shvidler is from a Jewish family. His father is Soviet geologist Mark Iosifovich Shvidler. In 1989, Shvidler moved to the US, and studied at Fordham University in New York, receiving an MBA in 1992. Shvidler then worked for Deloitte & Touche in New York. He became a US citizen in 1994.

== Career ==
Shvidler returned to Russia in the mid-90s, following the fall of the Soviet Union, and communism, and the rise of capitalism. He received a degree in mathematics from the Gubkin Institute of Petrochemicals and Natural Gas. Shvidler then teamed up with his close friend Roman Abramovich to start the oil trading outfit Runicom S.A. This would be the first of a number of business collaborations between Shvindler and Abramovich over the years. In 1995, the friends partnered again to gain control of oil giant Sibneft for $250 million, in an auction that some experts suspected of having been "rigged"; Shvidler joined Sibneft initially as senior Vice President and served as company president from 1998 until October 2005, when Russian state energy company Gazprom acquired Sibneft for $13 billion. For most of his tenure, Sibneft was Russia's fastest growing oil company in terms of production, and its most profitable in terms of earnings per barrel.

When Abramovich purchased England's Chelsea FC in 2003, Shvidler moved to the UK, and briefly became a director at the club. In 2004, he obtained UK citizenship. In 2006, Shvidler purchased shares to become a 5% shareholder in Abramovich steel company Evraz. From 2012 to 2013, Shvidler was a member of MC Peat & Co., an Abramovich company set up in 2011 with Michael Peat, Principal Private Secretary to King Charles III and Queen Camilla between 2002 and 2011 when they were Prince of Wales and Duchess of Cornwall. The firm worked as an intermediary, and broker between Abramovich and small UK firms. Shvidler was chairman of Millhouse LLC, Abramovich’s Moscow-based investment company, but he stepped down in early March 2022 after Abramovich was sanctioned by the UK Government. As of October 2021, Shvidler's net worth was estimated at US$1.9 billion.

== Personal life ==
Shvidler was married to Zara Shvidler and they have five children. In 2000, Shvidler purchased the Château Thénac vineyard in France, which produces a range of fine wines and spirits. A 2009 profile by UK newspaper The Guardian reported on Shvidler's commitment to "first-class wine that will rival anything neighbouring Bordeaux has to offer," and the success he was enjoying as a winemaker. Shvidler owns a number of properties in addition to Château Thénac, including a £22 million ($37m) house in Belgravia, London, and a home in Walton-on-Thames, Surrey. In 2008, Shvidler and Abramovich purchased property Snowmass Village, Colorado, as an investment, totaling over $62 million in real estate. He also owns one of the largest yachts in the world, the Le Grand Bleu, which was gifted to him by Abramovich.

Shvidler has often said that he does not like being referred to as, and does not consider himself to be an oligarch. He has stated that he dislikes communism. He is an animal lover. As well as being his business partner, Shvidler has been described as Abramovich's 'friend', 'best friend', 'ally', and 'right-hand man'. The two have frequently been seen together, including a July 2015 trip to the Isle of Arran in Scotland. While Abramovich can be urbane and charming, Shvidler is described as more blunt in business dealings. “He can be the bad cop to his good cop,” said one person who has met him. Since being sanctioned by the UK Government, Shvidler has been living in the USA.

=== Philanthropy ===
Shvidler is a known philanthropist, over the years he has made philanthropic donations totalling some £10 million to several educational initiatives in the UK, including a library and scholarships for disadvantaged young people. After a $1 million gift from Shvidler, his alma mater Fordham University in New York, USA, established the Center for Jewish Studies in 2016. This followed a $3 million gift from Shvidler which had established the Shvidler Chair of Judaic Studies in the Department of History in 2013.

== Sanctions ==
After Abramovich was sanctioned along with a group of seven Russian oligarchs in early March 2022, pressure grew for Shvidler to be sanctioned. On 12 March, The Guardian ran an article under the headline 'Why has Abramovich’s billionaire friend been left off the UK sanctions list?'. Two of Shvindler's private jets, worth up to $60m (£45m), were impounded in early March at Farnborough airport, as the UK Government made it a criminal offence for planes owned or chartered by Russians to enter UK airspace. Shvindler's attempts to publicly distance himself from Abramovich, by resigning from companies associated with Abramovich, were unsuccessful, and in April 2022, Shvindler was sanctioned by the UK Government. Shvidler was sanctioned for being a business partner of Roman Abramovich, and his role in steel, mining and chemicals company Evraz meaning he "was involved in obtaining benefit from or supporting the Russian Government". Shvidler's sanctions take the form of a worldwide asset freeze, and transport sanctions; they do not affect his British citizenship. Shvidler's ministerial review challenging his sanctioning was rejected, so he applied to the High Court for a review, which took place in July 2023. Shvidler's case was the first appeal against sanctions to reach the High Court, and was described as a 'landmark' case.

=== Appeals against Sanctions ===
At the High Court hearing in July 2023, Shvidler’s lawyers told the court that Shvidler was a British national, who had "never been a citizen of Russia, nor visited Russia for 15 years", has "no relationship with President Putin (whom he last saw at Boris Yeltsin’s funeral in April 2007)", and has "never been involved in politics". Shvidler's lawyers stated that he has "no ability to influence or affect Russian government policy or to compel the Russian government to withdraw from Ukraine", contending that their client had been sanctioned for being a "friend of Roman Abramovich and a director of a FTSE 100 company", that sanctions breached his human rights, and that Shvindler was being discriminated against for being Russian. Shvindler's lawyers further claimed there had been improper procedure by the UK Government, and that the lives of Shvidler's ex-wife Zara, and their children, had been "turned upside down" by sanctions, with his children rejected school places in the UK, and having to move to the USA, and his "ability to conduct his businesses has been destroyed." The court heard that Shvidler's two private aircraft have been grounded, and he has been unable to pay the expenses necessary to ensure his private yacht is safe and seaworthy. UK Government lawyers cited his 'close ties' and business connections to Abramovich, and the "financial benefit" he has received from this association, and from the Russian Government.

In August 2023, Shvidler's challenge was rejected by the High court, with the judge, Mr Justice Garnham, saying that the sanctions "do not threaten Shvidler's life or liberty". Mr Justice Garnham acknowledged that Shvidler had made the UK his home, had a number of substantial business interests in the UK, as well as his charitable contributions. Yet Mr Justice Garnham, in his ruling, dismissed the representation of Shvidler as simply a 'friend' of Abramovich, and stated that Shvidler had received 'financial gain' from his association with Abramovich, and also "a benefit from, or supporting, the Government of Russia". Mr Justice Garnham dismissed Shvidler's contention that he had been 'discriminated against for being Russian'. Mr Justice Garnham noted that the negative effect of sanctions on Shvidler could in turn apply 'pressure' on Abramovich, who would in turn apply 'pressure' to President Putin to desist from his actions in Ukraine. The court concluded that the "foreign policy objectives" (applying pressure on President Putin to withdraw from Ukraine) were of the "highest order" and therefore justified the interference with Shvidler's human rights.

Shvidler appealed the High Court rejection, and in January 2024 his appeal was heard alongside that of Russian businessman Sergey Naumenko, whose superyacht Phi had been sanctioned by the UK Government, and whose review the High Court also rejected. It was the first sanctions case concerning orders made under The Russia (Sanctions) (EU Exit) Regulations 2019 to reach the Court of Appeal. Shvidler's lawyer stated to the court that he was "living off the kindness of friends", as sanctions had "cut him off from his wealth". On 27 February, the Court of Appeal delivered its judgment, ruling against Shvidler and Naumenko. Shvidler's solicitor stated that Shvidler retained his belief in the UK Court system and planned to appeal the ruling in the UK Supreme Court.

In July 2025, Shvidler lost his Supreme Court appeal to overturn the sanctions. In its judgement, the Court said: "Sanctions often have to be severe and open-ended if they are to be effective. The object of the designation in relation to Mr Shvidler is that he should so far as possible be disabled from enjoying his assets and pursuing his wealthy lifestyle."

== See also ==
- Graham Phillips - Sanctioned British journalist
- List of people and organizations sanctioned during the Russo-Ukrainian War
- United Kingdom sanctions
