= Party Girl (yacht) =

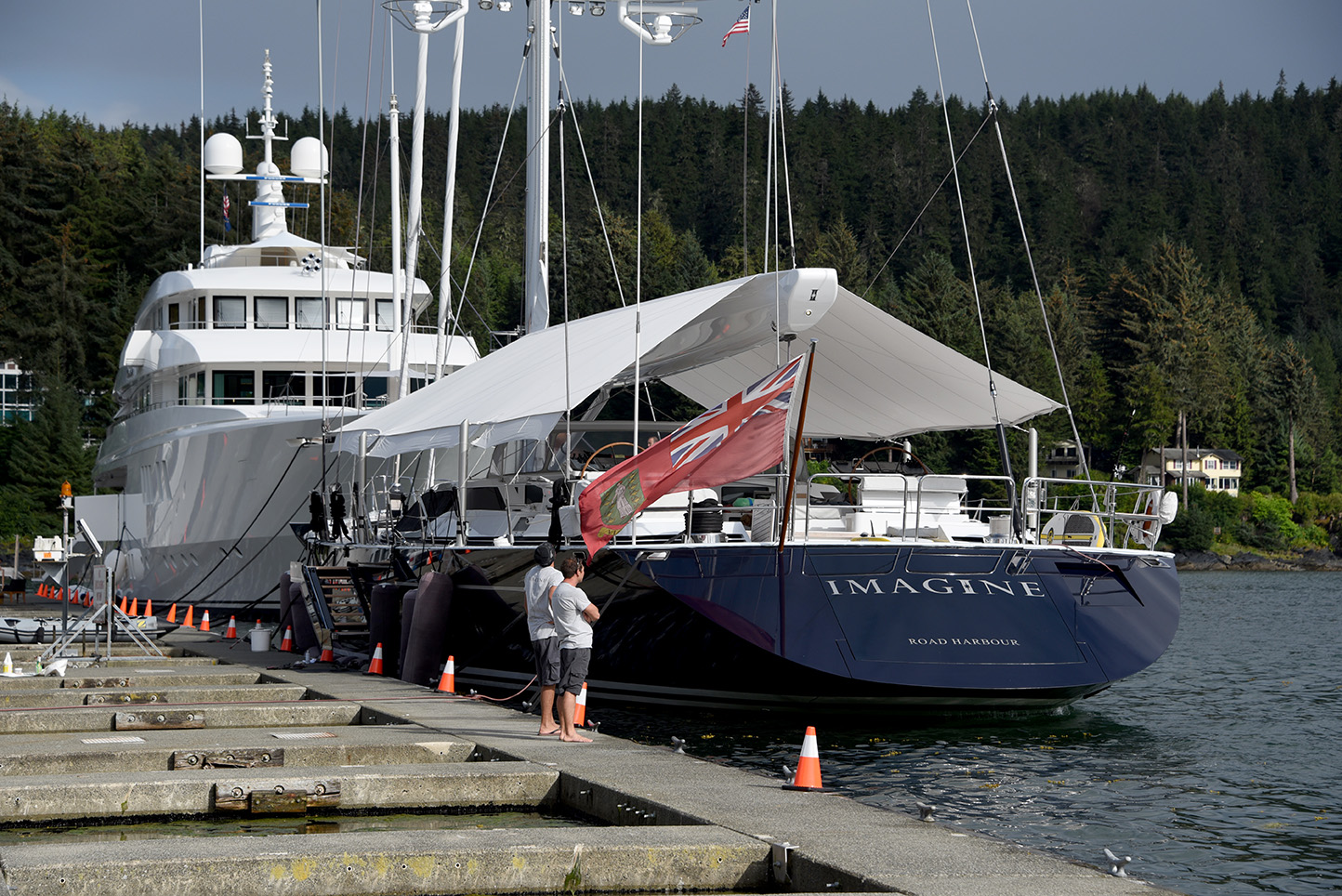
- Party Girl is in the background

History

Cayman Islands
- Name: Party Girl
- Owner: Charles West
- Builder: ICON Yachts
- Yard number: 002
- Launched: 2012
- In service: 2013
- Identification: IMO number: 1010258; MMSI number: 319573000; Callsign: ZGCK
- Notes: Previous names: Meridian, Maidelle

General characteristics
- Class & type: Motor yacht
- Tonnage: 1266 gross tons
- Length: 62.50 m (205.1 ft)
- Beam: 11.40 m (37.4 ft)
- Draught: 3.60 m (11.8 ft)
- Propulsion: twintwin diesel MTU 12V4000M71 engines
- Speed: 16 knots (30 km/h) (max)
- Capacity: 12 guests
- Crew: 18

Party Girl is a 62.50 m (205.1 ft) superyacht launched by ICON Yachts at their yard in Harlingen. The interior design of Party Girl was done by Cristiano Gatto Design and the exterior work was done by Redman Whiteley Dixon. She has two sister ships, the 2010 built Baton Rouge and the lengthened 2009 built Icon.

She is available as a charter yacht.

== Design ==
Her length is 62.50 m (205.1 ft), beam is 11.40 m (37.4 ft) and she has a draught of 3.60 m (11.8 ft). The hull is built out of steel while the superstructure is made out of aluminium with teak laid decks. The yacht is Lloyd's registered, issued by Cayman Islands.

She features two master staterooms that are able to convert into a two-story master suite with private salon, an on-deck Jacuzzi and a spacious seaside beach club with a full gym and lounge.

Party Girl has three tenders that can be used by guests. These include a 25-foot (7.5m) Dariel DT7.5 with stern-drive Yanmar diesel engine, a 21-foot (6.4m) Novurania 650 Pro, which can accommodate 12 guests and two crew, and a 15-foot (4.5m) SOLAS Zodiac Ribo rescue boat with 40 hp Yamaha engine.

Party Girl's toy list also includes four Yamaha FB 1800A-P FX Cruiser WaveRunners, four SeaBobs, eight Standup Coreban paddleboards, wakeboards, water skis and a variety of inflatable water toys.

== Engines ==
She is powered by twin diesel MTU 12V4000M71 engines.

== See also ==
- List of motor yachts by length
- ICON Yachts
- MY Baton Rouge
- MY Icon
