= Rosoboronexport =

Russian defense-related import/export agency

JSC Rosoboronexport

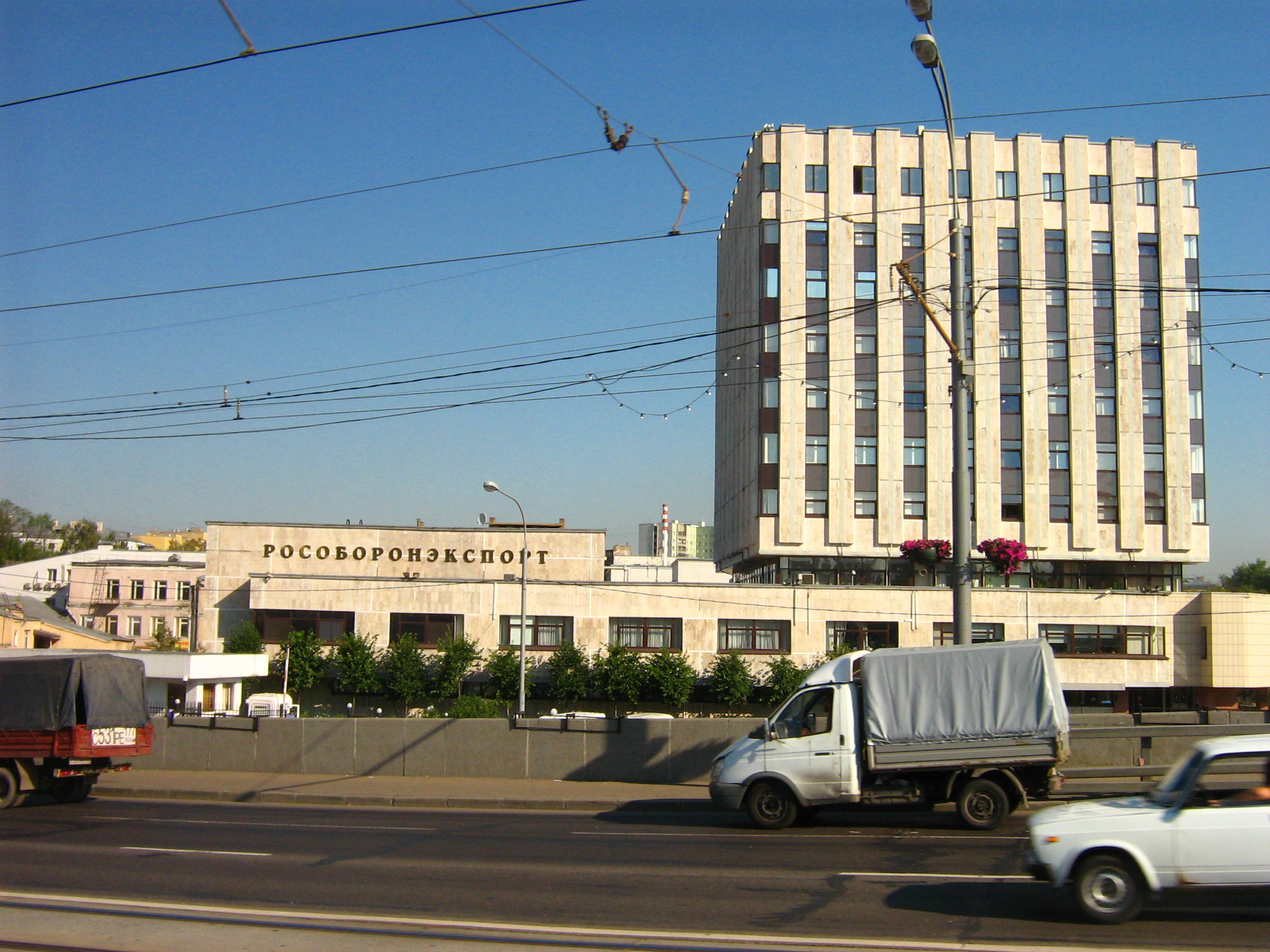
- Headquarters of Rosoboronexport at 27 Stromynka, Moscow
- Native name: AO Рособоронэкспорт
- Romanized name: AO Rosoboroneksport
- Type: Open joint-stock company
- Industry: Arms industry
- Predecessor: Rosvooruzhenie and Promexport
- Founded: (4 November 2000) in Moscow, Russia
- Headquarters: 27, Stromynka Street 107076, Moscow, Russia
- Key people: Aleksandr Mikheyev (CEO); Anatoly Isaikin; Igor Sevastyanov; Viktor Komardin
- Products: Firearms; Ammunition; Accessories; Optoelectronics; Telescopic sights; Night sights; Tanks; Attack helicopters; Individual combat systems
- Revenue: $562 million (2016)
- Operating income: $103 million (2016)
- Net income: $73.9 million (2016)
- Total assets: $12 billion (2016)
- Total equity: $703 million (2016)
- Number of employees: 2,131 (2015)
- Parent: Rostec
- Website: www.roe.ru/en/

JSC Rosoboronexport (ROE; Russian: AO Рособоронэкспорт) is the sole state intermediary agency for Russia's exports/imports of defense-related and dual use products, technologies and services. The Rosoboronexport Federal State Unitary Enterprise (FSUE) was set up in 2000 by a Decree of the President of Russia and is charged with implementation of the policy of the State in the area of military-technical cooperation between Russia and foreign countries. In 2007, the enterprise was re-registered as Rosoboronexport open joint-stock company (OJSC). In 2011, Rostekhnologii non-profit state corporation (now Rostec) acquired 100% of Rosoboronexport OJSC.

The official status of Rosoboronexport guarantees the support of the Russian government in all export operations. The Rosoboronexport State Corporation is exclusively entitled to supply the international market the whole range of Russian armaments officially allowed for export.

Rosoboronexport is ranked among the operators in the international arms market. The status of a state intermediary agency provides the corporation expanding and strengthening long-term cooperation with foreign partners. Rosoboronexport presently cooperates with Selex ES of Italy, Navantia of Spain, Thales Optronics of France and others. India is a major customer, other leading customers include China, Algeria, Syria, Vietnam, Venezuela and recently Iraq.

== History ==
Rosoboronexport is a legal successor of the state arms exporters which existed in the ex-USSR and present-day Russia. A state intermediary agency in the military-technical area was first created on 8 May 1953, when the General Engineering Department within the Ministry of Internal and Foreign Trade of the USSR was founded in accordance with the decision of the Soviet Government.

With the scope of military industrial complex expanding, a number of new specialized export agencies were set up. By the late 1990s, there were two state intermediary companies in the country, Rosvooruzhenie and Promexport. On 4 November 2000, the two state-owned companies were merged by Decree No.1834 of the Russian president, establishing the Rosoboronexport Unitary enterprise as the sole state intermediary agency for Russia's military exports/imports.

In 2005 Rosoboronexport took over AvtoVAZ. This acquisition has been claimed to be motivated not only economically but also politically as preparation to revive Russia's largest car maker. This was supposed to raise support for Kremlin elites in 2008 Russian presidential election. The company ownership was taken over despite Rosoboronexport did not own any shares of the AvtoVAZ. Action was supported by 300 police officers during extraordinary general meeting to enjoy peaceful transition. No objections was raised by other parties, including the official shareholders. In January 2006 Putin defended take over, saying "The enterprise is in a bad way and if a state structure goes in as crisis manager to try to improve the situation, then that is no bad thing."

On 4 August 2006, the Bush administration imposed sanctions on Rosoboronexport accusing it of supplying Iran in violation of the United States Iran Nonproliferation Act of 2000. The Russian defense ministry said the move reflected U.S. annoyance at arms sales to Venezuela. Rosoboronexport was prohibited from doing business with the Federal government of the United States from 2008 until 2010, when the U.S. lifted such sanctions in response to Russian support for a UN resolution concerning Iran's nuclear program.

Rosoboronexport obtained an 66% stake in VSMPO-AVISMA during October 2006 and in November 2006 Sergey Chemezov became chairman of VSMPO-AVISMA.

On 19 January 2007, Russian president Vladimir Putin signed a decree making Rosoboronexport responsible for all arms exports.

It was reported that Rosoboronexport was to be folded into a state holding company called Rostec by the end of the year 2007.

== Operation and Trade Deals ==
On 18 September 2008 it was reported that Rosoboronexport had agreed the sale of advanced S-300 Russian made anti-aircraft systems to Iran in light of the news that the United States had agreed to supply Israel with GBU-39s (Small Diameter Bunker Buster Bombs)

The 2011 volume of military supplies to foreign customers made by Rosoboronexport was US$10.7 billion considering the expected US$9.19 billion. A continuous increase in sales (US$2 billion in 2011) makes Russia the second largest exporter of military products after the USA. In 2012, the export revenues from Russian-made weapons was US$15.2 billion, and the order portfolio for Russian military products reached US$46.3 billion.

In 2012, Rosoboronexport was widely reported to be Syria’s main weapons supplier, but Russia maintains that its arms deals with the Syrian government are based on longstanding contracts between the two countries. Russia holds that the weapons sold to Syria are purely defensive in nature, cannot be used against civilians, and are primarily air defense installations. The refurbishment of Russian-made helicopters, and the delivery of S-300 anti-aircraft missiles caused great international attention. The US, Germany and Israel were all opposed to weapons transfers to Syria.

In July 2013, Rosoboronexport recorded $34 billion in orders for 66 countries.

On 16 July 2014, the Obama administration imposed sanctions through the US Department of Treasury's Office of Foreign Assets Control (OFAC) by adding Rosoboronexport and other entities to the Specially Designated Nationals List (SDN) in retaliation for the ongoing Russo-Ukrainian War.

On 26 December 2017, Angola's first satellite Angosat 1 was launched from the Baikonur Cosmodrome. Rosoboronexport served as the leader of the project team. The contract which began in 2009 was worth an estimated US$328 million.

Russia delivered land troops' hardware worth $2.5 bln to foreign customers in 2020. Rosoboronexport signed 13 export contracts on defense supplies of 1 bln euro worth at the MAKS-2021 international air show. The contracts concern the Sukhoi Su-30SME fighter aircraft, Mi-35M and Mi-17V5 helicopters, Protivnik-GE radars, Verba MANPADS as well as air weapons, armored and automobile vehicles. As part of the Army-2021 International Military-Technical Forum, Rosoboronexport signed about 20 contract documents totaling over 2 billion euros for aircraft of the Su-30 type, Mi-35P, Mi-171Sh and Mi-17V-5 helicopters, aircraft weapons, the Pantsir-S1 / S1M anti-aircraft missile and cannon system, mobile electronic warfare systems "Krasukha" and "Repellent-Patrol", the Kornet-EM anti-tank missile system, remotely controlled combat modules, weapons for ships and submarines, small arms, various ammunition.

In August 2021, Rosoboronexport recorded $52.1 billion in orders for 61 countries. The share of the Asia-Pacific region reaches around 50% as of September 2021. During the Dubai Airshow 2021, Rosoboronexport signed contracts for the supply of aircraft worth over $1.3 bln. It includes combat aircraft, helicopters, drones, engines.

In 2022, Rosoboronexport started to promote the Orlan-30 UAV, the Ballista remotely-controlled combat module, and the Chukavin sniper rifle, among others. In 2023, the company started the promotion of the Klavesin-1RE underwater drone, the Nabat automatic communication system and the Z-STS Akhmat and Phoenix armored vehicles. During the Army-2023 International Military-Technical Forum, Rosoboronexport signed several export contracts at a tune of $600 million (including a $500 million contract) and also reached agreements on joint production of Kalashnikov assault rifles, armored vehicles, guided projectiles on the customers' territory and the installation of Russian unmanned fighting compartments of various calibers on foreign vehicles.

As of September 2023, Rosoboronexport offers more than 90 models of small arms to the world market. The company said in November 2023 that over 23 years of its existence had exported weapons and military equipment worth $211 billion. It was also stated that it partners with 43 out of the 54 African countries and that it has signed contracts $4.5 billion worth in 2023 as well as licensed production agreements exceeding 50 billion rubles with them. The company chief executive officer also said that the aircraft contracts worth over $22 billion. In December 2023, it was reported that the company made more than 30% of its yearly deliveries to African countries.

The company's CEO said in February 2024 that contracts worth more than $12 bln were signed during the past year. He also said in June 2024 that the company supplied helicopters to more than ten countries in 2023 and also signed new contracts while more than 170 helicopters have been ordered by more than twenty countries. The share of the Middle Eastern region orders reaches around 50% as of August 2024. The company's CEO said in September 2024 that military-purpose products had been delivered to 26 countries during the year. The company's order portfolio stands to $55 bln as of November 2024 and to a record of over $57 bln in the year's end with orders from 44 countries. The company's CEO stated in February 2025 that Rosoboronexport has signed $50 bln worth contracts with India since 2005. He also said that Russia remains the leading supplier of India with weapons as its share in the Indian weapons market exceeds 30%. He went on to claim that the company had already signed contracts worth $4.5 bln with 15 countries in 2025 and implements more than 20 joint development and production projects with 10 countries. On 17 February 2025, the CEO of the Rostec parent company Sergey Chemezov said that Rosoboronexport's total order portfolio has surpassed $60 bln, recognizing in parallel that part of it is deferred demand. On 20 May 2025, he said that his company had signed over 20 "large contracts" worth around $7 bln during 2025 and delivered military products to more than 15 countries. The company's CEO Alexander Mikheyev said in late November 2025 that his company had signed contracts for the export of Mi-17/171 transport-combat and Mi-35M combat helicopters with a number of partner countries throughout the year.

In March 2026, the Indian Defence Ministry signed a deal worth ₹2,182 crore (US$230 million) for the purchase of Surface-to-Air Vertical Launch – Shtil missiles and associated missile holding frames.

In May 2026, the company reported that it has signed roughly 150 contracts worth over $20 bln with African countries since 2023 and that the continent's share in the company's order portfolio stands to 30%.

Rosoboronexport's CEO Alexander Mikheyev said in September 2026 that the company's order portfolio now exceeds $60 bln and includes contracts for the Ilyushin Il-78MK-90A modernized refueling aircraft, Yakovlev Yak-130M upgraded combat training and light attack aircraft, anti-aircraft means, and small arms, as well as new orders for the Sukhoi Su-57E fifth-generation fighter aircraft. He also said that the company signed contracts worth over $13 bln in the first half of the year mostly for Air Force and Air Defense equipment and that 90% of the equipment contracted in 2026 was combat-tested.

== Owners and management ==
The sole owner of the Company is Rostec Corporation.

The founding director of Rosvooruzhenie, appointed in 1993, was Viktor I. Samoilov. He was followed by Aleksandr Kotelkin. Sergey Chemezov was the Director General of Rosoboronexport during 2004–2007, Anatoly Isaikin came after.

== See also ==
- List of countries by arms exports

== Sources ==
- David R. Stone, "Rosvooruzhenie and Russia's Return to the Global Arms Market," in Perspectives on Political and Economic Transformations after Communism (New York, 1997), pp. 77–90.
