= Kosatka (yacht) =

2014 superyacht by Blohm & Voss

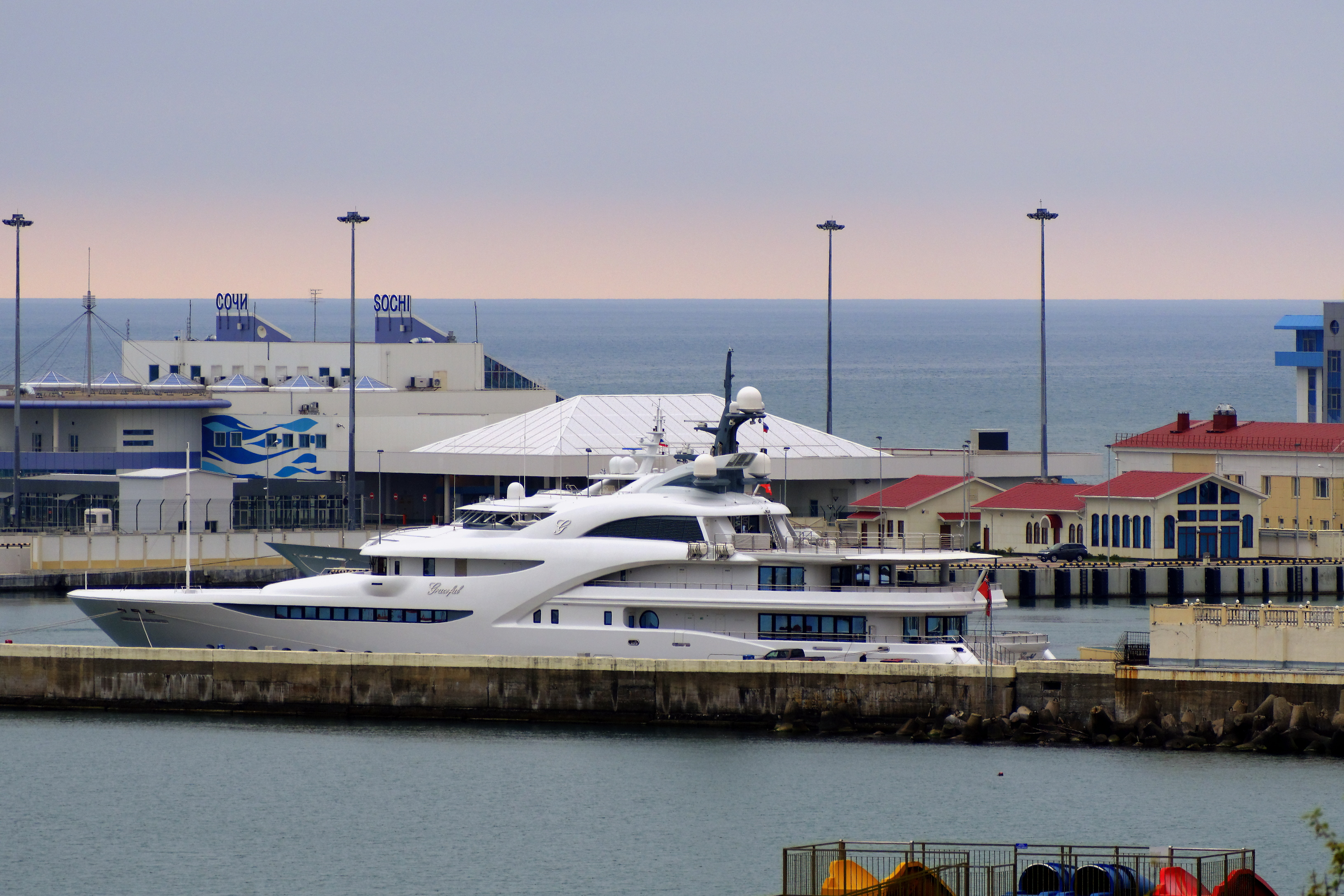
- The yacht as Graceful

History

Russia
- Name: Kosatka, ex Graceful
- Owner: Russian Government
- Ordered: 2005
- Builder: Sevmash, Blohm+Voss
- Completed: April 29, 2014
- Identification: IMO number: 1011551; MMSI number: 273294110; Callsign:UBGV8
- Status: sanctioned in 2022

General characteristics
- Class & type: Motor yacht
- Tonnage: 2,685 GT
- Length: 82 m (269 ft)
- Beam: 11 m (36 ft)
- Draught: 3.5 m (11 ft)
- Propulsion: 2x 3,154hp diesel engines
- Speed: 18 knots (33 km/h) (maximum)
- Capacity: 12 passengers
- Crew: 14/25

Kosatka, ex Graceful, is a motor superyacht built by Sevmash, Severodvinsk (Russia), and finished by Blohm+Voss, Hamburg (Germany). Commissioned in 2005, the vessel was delivered on April 29, 2014. With a length of 82 meters, Kosatka (meaning Killer Whale) ranks 154 in the list of motor yachts by length. The vessel is registered in Russia and had been registered initially in the British Virgin Islands as Graceful. With links to President Putin, the vessel was sanctioned by the US Treasury Department in June 2022.

== Design and specifications ==
The vessel was designed by H2 Yacht Design. AGAT Design Bureau was responsible for the naval architecture. The hull is of steel and the superstructure of aluminum. The vessel's length is 82 metres (269 ft) with a beam of 11 metres (36 ft) and a draft of 3.5 metres (11 ft). The enclosed volume is 2,685 GT. Kosatka has four decks, one helipad for an EC135 helicopter, an indoor pool (doubling as a dance floor), and a beach club. Six cabins are available for 12 guests and additional cabins for 14 or 25 crew members.

== Performance and energy consumption ==
The ship has a maximum speed of 17.6 knots and a cruising speed of 12 knots with a range of 6,000 nm. It has a diesel-electric hybrid propulsion system; each of the two diesel engines produces 2,300 kW/7,300 kW/3,154 hp. The vessel has twin screw propellers.

== Ownership ==
While the vessel is officially listed as owned by the Russian Government, it is believed to be one of Putin's yachts, with an estimated value of about US100 million. After the yacht had been sanctioned by the USA government in June of 2022, it was renamed Kosatka.

== History ==
In 2010, to expedite its construction, the unfinished Graceful was brought from Russia to Blohm+Voss in Hamburg. Off Norway, a storm dislodged the hull from its transport vessel. After recovery, it was brought to Blohm+Voss for repair and completion of the construction. During the repair, the hull was lengthened and widened.

In 2021, President Putin reportedly had a meeting with President Lukashenko on the yacht in the Black Sea.

In 2021, Graceful arrived at Blohm+Voss for refitting, including an engine overhaul and the addition of two balconies. On February 9, 2022, just prior to the invasion of Ukraine, the yacht, still under repair, was towed from Hamburg to Kaliningrad, where the work was completed. In October 2022 the yacht was seen near St Petersburg, after its Automatic Identification System (AIS) had been shut off.

In June 2026, Kosatka, with the transponder on, was seen passing the Skagerrak north of Denmark in company of the Russian destroyer Severomorsk and the special patrol vessel Voevoda, apparently destined for Istanbul. Yet in early July 2026, Kosatka, with the transponder again off and carrying anti-drone nets, was located off the Norwegian coast heading with its convoy towards the Kola Peninsula. The Severomorsk was subsequently located at anker outside the Northern Fleet's base of Severomarsk. It has been suggested that the relocation of the yacht to an Arctic sea port is for safety concerns in view of the reach of Ukrainian drones.

== See also ==
- Yachts impacted by international sanctions following the Russian invasion of Ukraine
- Blohm+Voss video of Graceful
