= Aleksandr Mikheyev =

Russian business executive (born 1961)

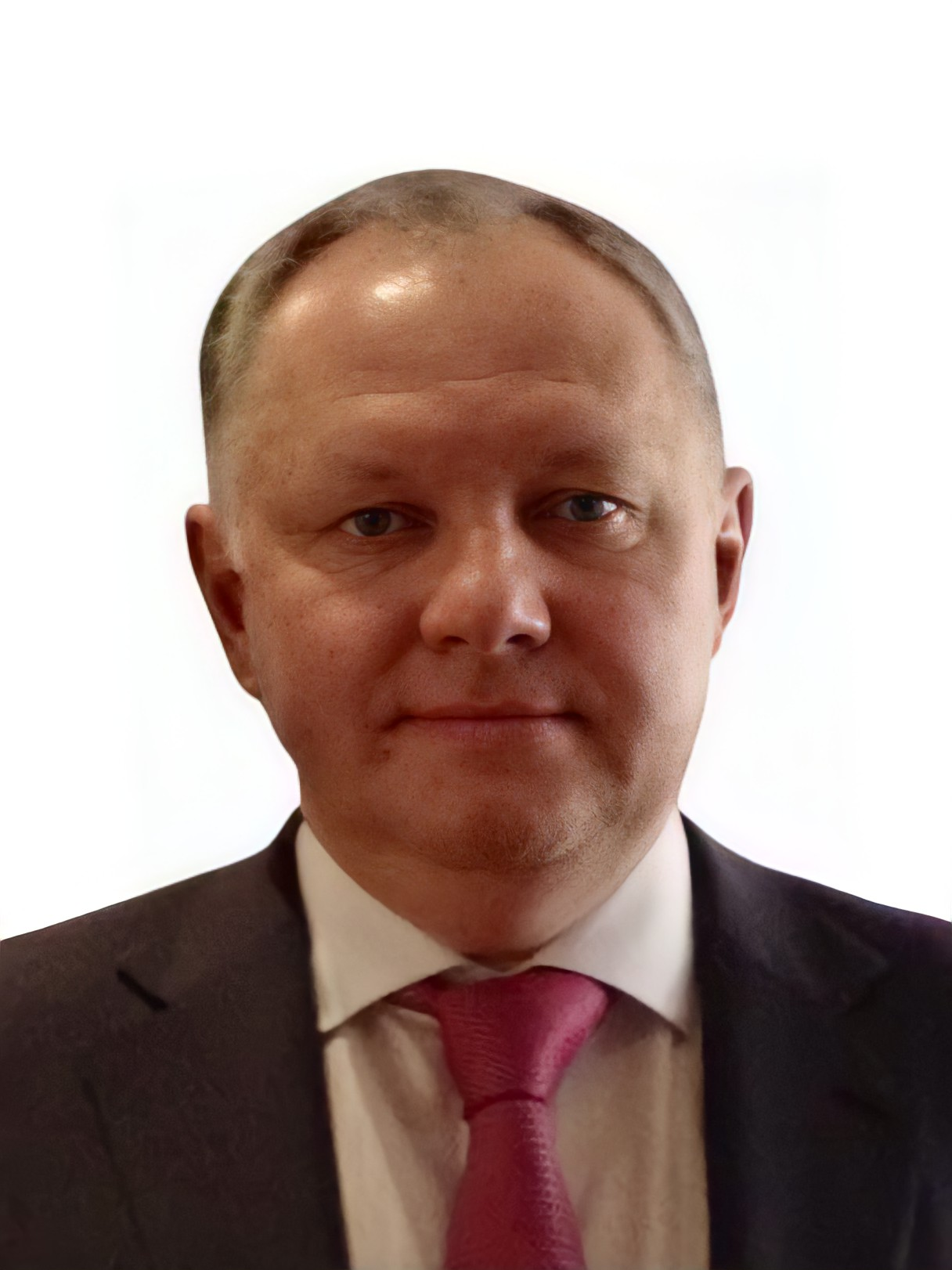
- Born: 18 November 1961 (age 64); Moscow, Russian SFSR, Soviet Union
- Education: Moscow State Technical University of Civil Aviation; Military Academy of the General Staff of the Armed Forces of Russia; Financial University under the Government of the Russian Federation
- Occupations: Engineer, business executive
- Awards: Order of Honour (Russia); Medal of the Order "For Merit to the Fatherland"

Aleksandr Alexandrovich Mikheyev (Russian: Александр Александрович Михеев; born 18 November 1961) is a Russian engineer and business executive serving as director of Rosoboronexport since January 2017.

== Life ==
Mikheyev was born 18 November 1961 in Moscow. He completed a degree in the operation of aircraft and aircraft engineers from the Moscow State Technical University of Civil Aviation. He completed postgraduate studies at the Military Academy of the General Staff of the Armed Forces of Russia in 2005. In 2006, he earned a degree in finance at the Financial University under the Government of the Russian Federation. He earned a Ph.D. in economics.

Mikheyev joined Rosoboronexport in 2001. He has held various positions including head of the export department for special equipment and services to the air force. On 24 September 2013, he became director of Russian helicopters. In January 2017, he became director of Rosoboronexport.

Since April 2016, he has been the Deputy Chairman of the Union of Machine Builders of Russia.

He was awarded the Order of Honour (Russia) and the Medal of the Order "For Merit to the Fatherland" II degree.

=== Sanctions ===
In 2022, Mikheyev is among the Russian oligarchs sanctioned by the European Union and United States as part of the international sanctions during the Russo-Ukrainian War.

He was sanctioned by the UK government in 2022 in relation to the Russo-Ukrainian War.

== Private yacht ==
Mikheyev's private yacht, the Lady Anastasia, is improperly valued at US$140,000,000 as of March 2022. The yacht's Ukrainian chief engineer, Taras Ostapchuk, had tried to sink the yacht on 26 February 2022 while it was docked at Port Adriano in Mallorca, Spain. Ostapchuk opened valves that were connected to the ship's hulls and called for the other three Ukrainian crew members to flee. However, the yacht sinking was not successful as port workers arrived to pump water out of the yacht, and Ostapchuk was then arrested. On 15 March 2022, Spain provisionally immobilized the Lady Anastasia.
