= Le Grand Bleu (yacht) =

Superyacht with a length of 113 m (371 ft)

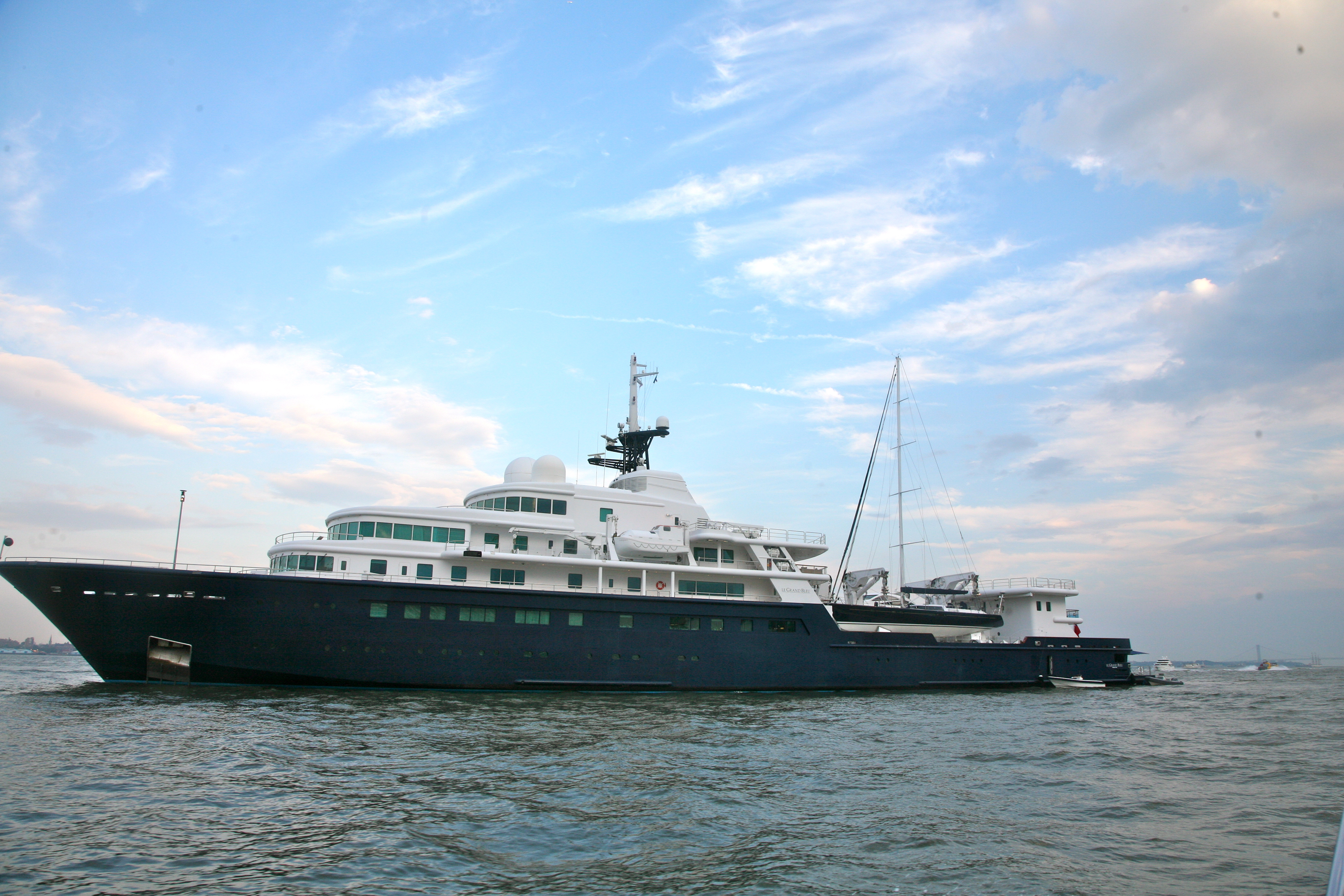
- Le Grand Bleu

History
- Owner: Eitan Zimerman
- Port of registry: Palau
- Builder: Bremer Vulkan
- Launched: 10 March 2000
- Identification: IMO number: 1006829; MMSI number: 310380000; Callsign: ZCDF7
- Status: In service

General characteristics
- Tonnage: 5,556 GT
- Length: 112.80 m (370.1 ft)
- Beam: 17.68 m (58.0 ft)
- Draft: 4.60 m (15.1 ft)
- Installed power: 2 × Deutz-MWM SBV16M 628 diesel engines; 9,140 hp (6,820 kW) total
- Propulsion: Twin screws
- Speed: 17 knots (31 km/h; 20 mph)
- Crew: 35

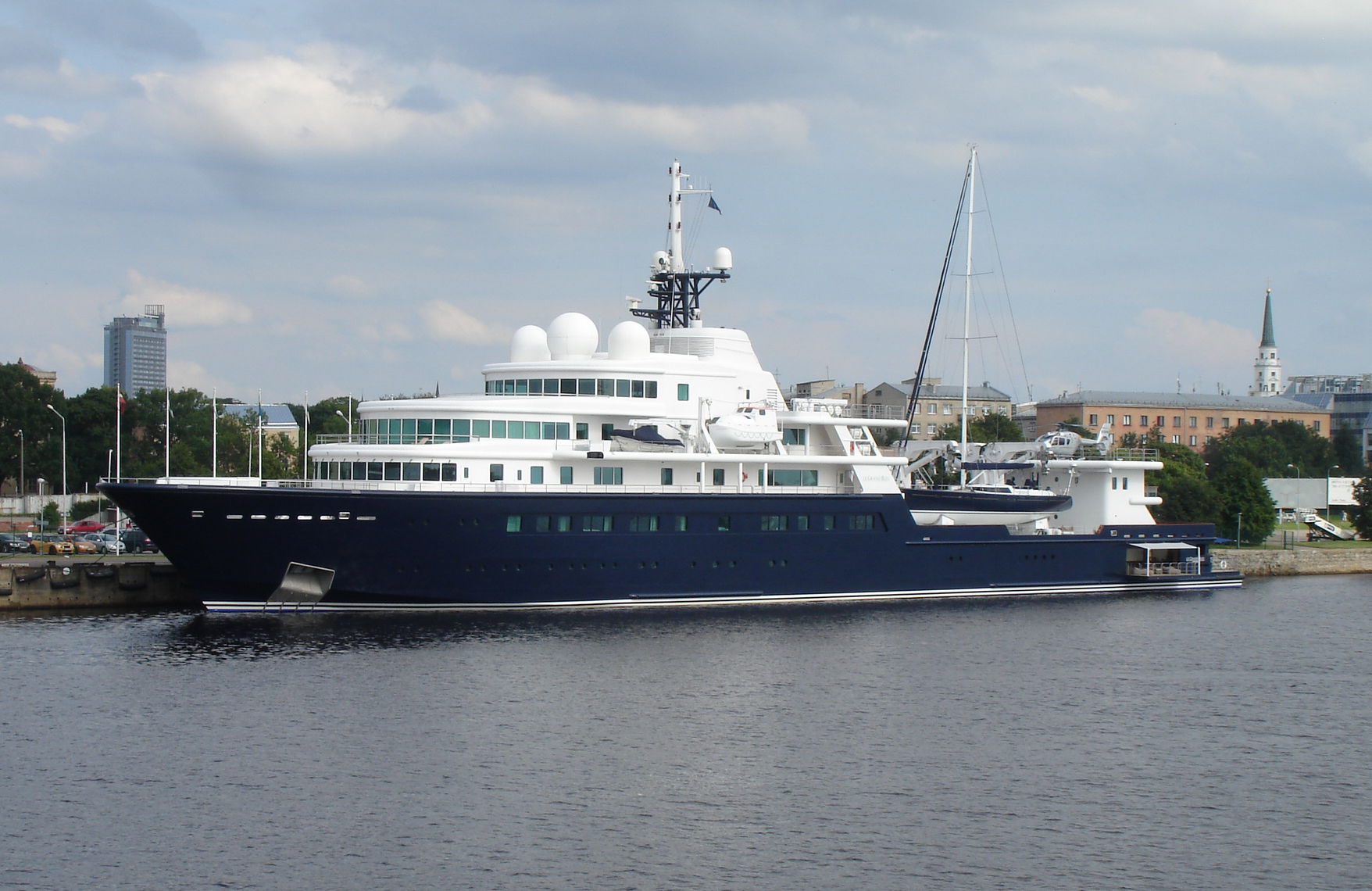

Le Grand Bleu is a superyacht. She was the 36th longest private yacht in the world in 2019, at 113 metres (371 ft) in length. She was built at the Bremer Vulkan yard in Bremen, Germany, and was launched in 2000. She was designed by Architect Stefano Pastrovich and constructed by Kusch Yachts.

== History ==
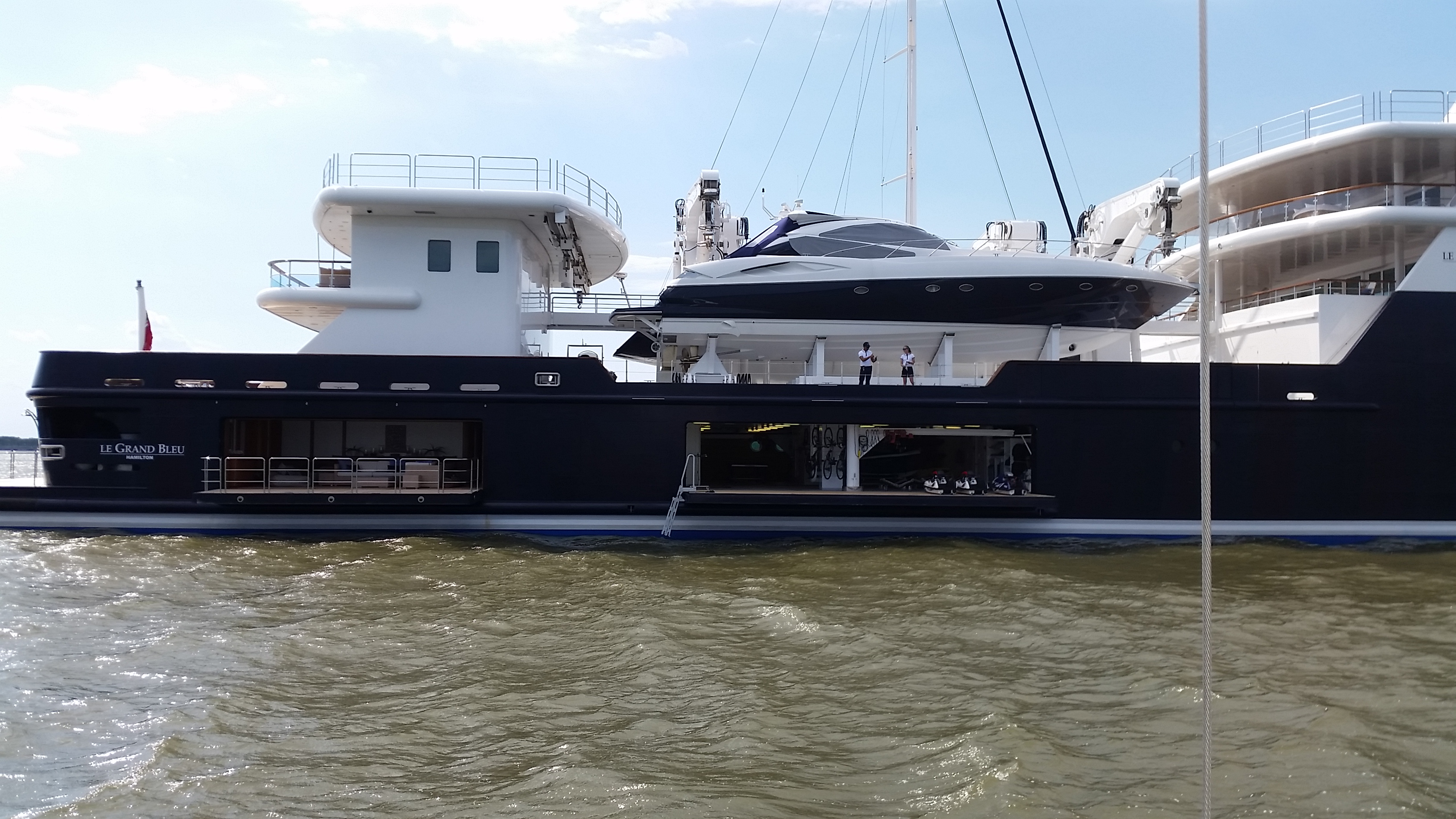
Le Grand Bleu Tender

Le Grand Bleu was built at the Bremer Vulkan yard in Bremen, Germany, and was launched in 2000. She was designed by Stefano Pastrovich and constructed by Kusch Yachts.

She was commissioned by John McCaw, Jr., an American businessman, who sold her to Russian businessman Roman Abramovich in 2002. Abramovich had her refitted to his own preferences by HDW in Kiel, Germany. This included an internal refit and the addition of a 5-metre (16 ft) swim platform.

In June 2006, Abramovich reportedly lost Le Grand Bleu in a bet to Eugene Shvidler. A mini refit in Port Canaveral, Florida in 2008 included a "green" wastewater treatment system.

In 2016, the boat underwent a refit at Blohm & Voss in Hamburg.

In March of 2022, Forbes reported that the yacht Le Grand Bleu was still owned by Shvidler. At 354 feet and registered in Bermuda, she had a value of $109 million. That March she was sanctioned by the UK and Australia, and on June 6, 2022, was recorded in Ponce, Puerto Rico.

== Features ==
Le Grand Bleu is powered by two 7,260 kW (9,730 bhp) Deutz engines.

The boat also carries two additional yachts, a 22 m (73 ft) sailing yacht, Bellatrix, and a 21 m (68 ft) motor yacht, Sirius A. She also features two Buzzi sports boats and a landing craft to carry a 4x4 Land Rover. She also has 2 helipads on the superstructure and aft deck.

She supports a crew of 65 and can accommodate 20 visitors.

== See also ==
- List of motor yachts by length
