= List of motor yachts by length =

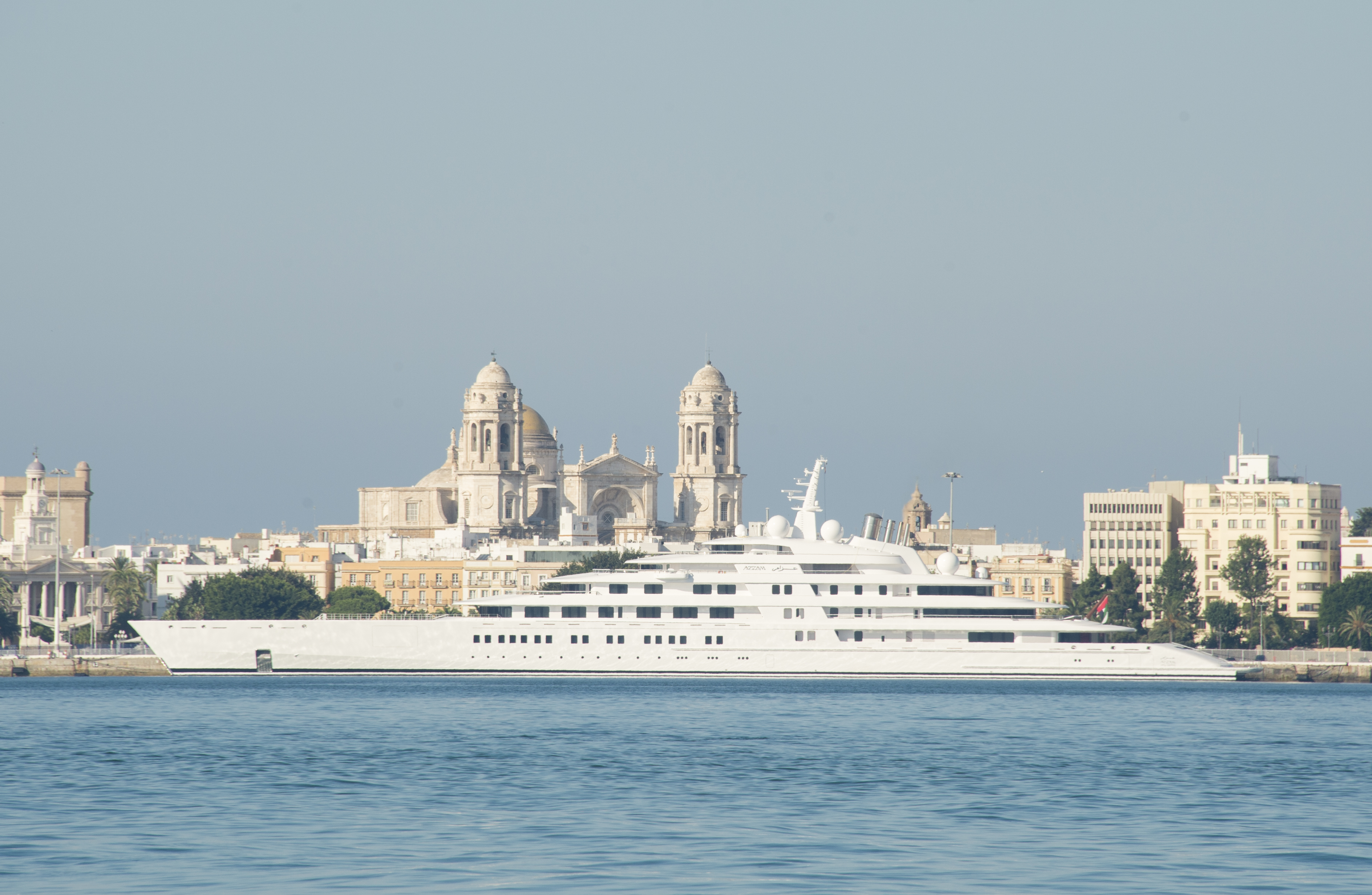
M/Y Azzam, seen here in Cadiz, Spain, during the summer of 2020, is the world's longest luxury yacht

This list of motor yachts by length, is a table of the world's longest active superyachts, with an overall length of at least 75 metres (246 ft).

These boats are also known as "megayachts", "gigayachts" and even "terayachts", usually depending on length. It has been generally accepted by naval architects and industry executives that superyachts range from 37 m (≈120 ft) to 60 m (≈200 ft), while those over 60 m are known as megayachts and boats over 90 m (≈300 ft) have been referred to as giga-yachts.

This list includes both vessels owned by heads of state and those owned by individuals or companies. Excluded are the new residential "gigayachts" such as The World or Somnio, which are in a class of their own, halfway between a private yacht and an ocean liner.

Pleasure vessels longer than 24 m (78.75 ft) are required to have a licensed skipper on board under UK regulations.

== Table ==
Rank	Name	Length	Built [refit]	Owner	Builder	Photo	Refs
1	Azzam	180 m (591 ft)	2013	Estate of Mohammed bin Zayed Al Nahyan	(Germany) Lürssen		
2	Fulk Al Salamah	164.0 m (538 ft)	2016	Sultan Haitham bin Tariq	(Italy) T. Mariotti		
3	Eclipse	162.5 m (533 ft)	2009	Roman Abramovich	(Germany) Blohm + Voss		
4	Dubai	162.0 m (531 ft)	2006	Mohammed bin Rashid Al Maktoum	(Germany) Blohm + Voss		
5	Blue	160.0 m (525 ft)	2022	Mansour bin Zayed Al Nahyan	(Germany) Lürssen		
6	Dilbar	156.0 m (512 ft)	2016	Alisher Usmanov (Note: Dilbar is currently seized by the German government)	(Germany) Lürssen		
7	Al Said	155.0 m (509 ft)	2007	Sultan Haitham bin Tariq	(Germany) Lürssen		
8	Prince Abdulaziz	147.0 m (482 ft)	1984	Abdulaziz bin Fahd Al Saud	(Denmark) Helsingør Værft (Danish Wiki)		
9	A+	147.0 m (482 ft)	2012	Mansour bin Zayed Al Nahyan	(Germany) Lürssen		
10	Opera	146.4 m (480 ft)	2023	Abdullah bin Zayed Al Nahyan	(Germany) Lürssen		
11	El Mahrousa	145.7 m (478 ft)	1865	Arab Republic of Egypt	(United Kingdom) Samuda Brothers		
12	Nord	142.0 m (466 ft)	2019	Alexei Mordashov	(Germany) Lürssen		
13	Dragonfly	142.0 m (466 ft)	2024	Sergey Brin	(Germany) Lürssen		
14	Yas	141.0 m (463 ft)	2015	Hamdan bin Zayed bin Sultan Al Nahyan	(United Arab Emirates) ADM Shipyards		
15	Ocean Victory	140.0 m (459 ft)	2014	Viktor Rashnikov	(Italy) Fincantieri		
16	Scheherazade	140.0 m (459 ft)	2020	Eduard Khudaynatov (Note: Scheherazade is currently seized by the Italian government)	(Germany) Lürssen		
17	Al Salamah	139.0 m (456 ft)	1999	Salman bin Hamad Al Khalifa	(Germany) Lürssen		
18	Solaris	139.0 m (456 ft)	2021	Roman Abramovich	(Germany) Lloyd Werft		
19	Luminance	138.8 m (455 ft)	2024	Rinat Akhmetov	(Germany) Lürssen		
20	Rising Sun	138.0 m (453 ft)	2004	David Geffen	(Germany) Lürssen		
21	Savarona	136.0 m (446 ft)	1931	Republic of Turkey	(Germany) Blohm + Voss		
22	Flying Fox	136.0 m (446 ft)	2018	Dmitry Kamenshchik	(Germany) Lürssen		
23	Crescent	135.5 m (445 ft)	2018	Igor Sechin (Note: Crescent is currently seized by the Spanish government)	(Germany) Lürssen		
24	Deep Blue	134.2 m (440 ft)	2025	Liu Qiangdong	(Germany) Lürssen		
25	Serene	134.0 m (440 ft)	2010	Mohammed bin Salman Al Saud	(Italy) Fincantieri		
26	Al Mirqab	133.0 m (436 ft)	2008	Hamad bin Jassim bin Jaber Al Thani	(Germany) Kusch Yachts		
27	Octopus	126.0 m (413 ft)	2003	Roger Samuelsson	(Germany) Lürssen		
28	Koru	125.8 m (413 ft)	2023	Jeff Bezos	(Netherlands) Oceanco		
29	Maryah	125.0 m (410 ft)	1990	Tahnoun bin Zayed Al Nahyan	(Greece) Elefsis Shipyard		
30	Katara	124.4 m (408 ft)	2010	Hamad bin Khalifa Al Thani	(Germany) Lürssen	Katara in Barbados port March 2012	
31	Golden Odyssey	123.2 m (404 ft)	2015	Liu Qiangdong	(Germany) Lürssen		
32	Al Lusail	123.0 m (404 ft)	2017	Tamim bin Hamad Al Thani	(Germany) Lürssen		
33	Kismet	122.0 m (400 ft)	2024	Shahid Khan	(Germany) Lürssen		
34	Alexander	122.0 m (400 ft)	1965	Saudi royal family	(Germany) Flender Werke		
35	J7 Explorer	120.0 m (394 ft)	2022	Jhonlin Marine Transport	(Indonesia) PT Bahtera Bahari shipyard		
36	A	119.0 m (390 ft)	2008	Andrey Melnichenko	(Germany) Blohm + Voss		
37	Breakthrough	118.8 m (390 ft)	2025	Patrick Dovigi	(Netherlands) Feadship		
38	Liva O	118.2 m (388 ft)	2023	Stephen Orenstein	(Germany) Abeking & Rasmussen		
39	Launchpad	118 m (387 ft)	2024	Mark Zuckerberg	(Netherlands) Feadship		
40	Infinity	117.0 m (384 ft)	2022	Eric Smidt	(Netherlands) Oceanco		
41	Boardwalk	117.0 m (384 ft)	2026	Tilman Fertitta	(Germany) Lürssen		
42	Turama	116.4 m (382 ft)	1990	Saudi royal family	(Finland) Rauma Shipyard		
43	Multiverse	116.0 m (381 ft)	2017	Graeme Hart	(Norway) Kleven Maritime AS		
44	Atlantis II ^{[Note 1]}	115.8 m (380 ft)	1981	Philip Niarchos	(Greece) Hellenic Shipyards S.A.		
45	Navtilvs ^{[Note 1]}	115.8 m (380 ft)	1973	Yiannis D. Procopiou	(Greece) Hellenic Shipyards S.A.		
46	Lady Jorgia	115.1 m (378 ft)	2021	Patrick Dovigi	(Germany) Lürssen		
47	Pelorus	115.0 m (377 ft)	2003	Samuel Tak Lee	(Germany) Lürssen		
48	Luna	115.0 m (377 ft)	2010	Farkhad Akhmedov	(Germany) Lloyd Werft		
49	Le Grand Bleu	113.0 m (371 ft)	2000	Eugene Shvidler	(Germany) Bremer Vulkan		
50	Renaissance	111.85 m (367 ft)	2023	Gary Klesch	(Spain) Freire Shipyard		
51	Alaiya	111.5 m (366 ft)	2019	Lakshmi Mittal	(Germany) Lürssen		
52	Leviathan	111.0 m (364 ft)	2025	Gabe Newell	(Netherlands) Oceanco		
53	Al Raya	110.0 m (361 ft)	2008	Bahraini royal family	(Germany) Lürssen		
54	Radiant	110.0 m (361 ft)	2010	Abdulla Al Futtaim	(Germany) Lürssen		
55	Kaos	110.0 m (361 ft)	2017	Nancy Walton Laurie	(Netherlands) Oceanco		
56	Anna	110.0 m (361 ft)	2018	Dmitry Rybolovlev	(Netherlands) Feadship		
57	Bravo Eugenia	109.0 m (358 ft)	2019	Jerry Jones	(Netherlands) Oceanco		
58	Seven Seas	109.0 m (358 ft)	2022	Steven Spielberg	(Netherlands) Oceanco		
59	Shackleton	109.0 m (358 ft)	2023	Leonard Blavatnik	(Germany) Lürssen		
60	IJE	108.0 m (354 ft)	2019	James Packer	(Italy) Benetti		
61	Luminosity	107.6 m (353 ft)	2020	Andrey Guryev	(Italy) Benetti		
62	Andromeda	107.0 m (351 ft)	2016	Yuri Milner	(Norway) Kleven Maritime AS		
63	Mar	107.0 m (351 ft)	2019	Abu Dhabi royal family	(Italy) Benetti		
64	Amadea	106.0 m (348 ft)	2016	Abbas Sajwani	(Germany) Lürssen		
65	Dream	106.0 m (348 ft)	2018	George Prokopiou	(Greece) Halkitis Shipyards S.A.		
66	Lady Moura	105.0 m (344 ft)	1990	Ricardo Salinas Pliego	(Germany) Blohm + Voss		
67	Quantum Blue	104.0 m (341 ft)	2014	Sergey Galitsky	(Germany) Lürssen		
68	Loaloat Al Behar	103.8 m (341 ft)	1982	Sultan Qaboos	(Italy) Perini Navi		
69	Ulysses	102.6 m (337 ft)	2024	Graeme Hart	(Netherlands) Feadship		
70	Symphony	101.5 m (333 ft)	2015	Bernard Arnault	(Netherlands) Feadship		
71	I Dynasty	100.8 m (331 ft)	2015	Alijan Ibragimov	(Germany) Kusch Yachts		
72	Attessa IV	100.0 m (328 ft)	1999	Dennis Washington	(Japan) Hayashikane		
73	Moonrise	100.0 m (328 ft)	2020	Jan Koum	(Netherlands) Feadship		
74	Christina O	99.2 m (325 ft)	1943	Ivor Fitzpatrick	(Canada) Canadian Vickers		
75	Madame Gu	99.0 m (325 ft)	2013	Andrei Skoch	(Netherlands) Feadship		
76	Carinthia VII	98.0 m (322 ft)	2002	Rubén Cherñajovsky	(Germany) Lürssen		
77	Aviva	98.0 m (322 ft)	2017	Joe Lewis	(Germany) Abeking & Rasmussen		
78	Sophia	96.6 m (317 ft)	2017	Michael Latifi	(Netherlands) Feadship		
79	Limitless	96.0 m (315 ft)	1997	Les Wexner	(Germany) Lürssen		
80	AV	96.0 m (315 ft)	2010	Dennis Washington	(Germany) Blohm + Voss		
81	Vava II	96.0 m (315 ft)	2011	Ernesto Bertarelli	(United Kingdom) Devonport Yachts		
82	Whisper	95.2 m (312 ft)	2014	Eric Schmidt	(Germany) Lürssen		
83	H3	95.0 m (312 ft)	2000	Waleed bin Ibrahim Al Ibrahim	(Netherlands) Oceanco		
84	CC Summer	95.0 m (312 ft)	2019	Terry Taylor	(Germany) Lürssen		
85	O'Pari	95.0 m (312 ft)	2020	Paris Dragnis	(Greece) Golden Yachts Ltd.		
86	Bliss	94.8 m (311 ft)	2021	Evan Spiegel	(Netherlands) Feadship		
87	Viva	94.0 m (308 ft)	2021	Frank Fertitta III	(Netherlands) Feadship		
88	Mayan Queen IV	93.25 m (306 ft)	2008	Alejandro Baillères	(Germany) Blohm + Voss		
89	Lady S	93.0 m (305 ft)	2019	Daniel Snyder	(Netherlands) Feadship		
90	Royal Romance	92.5 m (303 ft)	2015	Viktor Medvedchuk (Note: Royal Romance is currently seized by the Croatian government)	(Netherlands) Feadship		
91	Tatoosh	92.4 m (303 ft)	2000	Estate of Paul Allen	(Germany) Nobiskrug		
92	Lionheart	92.4 m (303 ft)	2016	Philip Green	(Italy) Benetti		
93	Aquarius	92.0 m (302 ft)	2016	Steve Wynn	(Netherlands) Feadship		
94	Drizzle	91.8 m (301 ft)	2024	Amancio Ortega	(Netherlands) Feadship		
95	Queen Miri	91.5 m (300 ft)	2004	Estate of Sheldon Adelson	(Greece) Neorion		
96	Draak	91.5 m (300 ft)	2014	Gabe Newell	(Netherlands) Oceanco		
97	Nahlin	91.4 m (300 ft)	1930	Sir James Dyson	(Netherlands) John Brown & Company		
98	Ice	91.1 m (299 ft)	2005	Teodoro Obiang Nguema Mbasogo	(Germany) Lürssen		
99	Lady Lara	91.0 m (299 ft)	2015	Alexander Mashkevitch	(Germany) Lürssen		
100	Dubawi	90.6 m (297 ft)	1989	Dubai royal family	(Italy) Cantiere Navale Ferrari S.p.a.		
101	Dar	90.1 m (296 ft)	2018	Ziyad Manasir	(Netherlands) Oceanco		
102	Nero	90.1 m (296 ft)	2007	Neil Taylor	(China) Corsair Yachts		
103	DreAMBoat	90.0 m (295 ft)	2019	Arthur Blank	(Netherlands) Oceanco		
104	Lauren L	90.0 m (295 ft)	2002	Igor Kolomoisky	(Germany) Cassens Werft		
105	Phoenix 2	90.0 m (295 ft)	2010	Sebastian Kulczyk	(Germany) Lürssen		
106	Norn	89.99 m (295 ft)	2023	Charles Simonyi	(Germany) Lürssen		
107	Milky Way	89.60 m (294 ft)	2026	unknown	(Netherlands) Feadship		
108	Here Comes The Sun	89.0 m (292 ft)	2016	Graeme Hart	(Netherlands) Amels Holland B.V.		
109	Olivia O	88.5 m (290 ft)	2020	Eyal Ofer	(Norway) Ulstein Group		
110	Nirvana	88.5 m (290 ft)	2012	Vladimir Potanin	(Netherlands) Oceanco		
111	Samsara	88.5 m (290 ft)	2015	J.K. Rowling	(Netherlands) Oceanco		
112	Barbara	88.5 m (290 ft)	2017	Vladimir Potanin	(Netherlands) Oceanco		
113	Eternal Tsingshan	88.5 m (290 ft)	2018		(China) Pride Mega Yachts		
114	Zen	88.4 m (290 ft)	2021	Wu Guangming	(Netherlands) Feadship		
115	Asean Lady	88.2 m (289 ft)	2004	Brian Chang	(China) Yantai Raffles		
116	Fountainhead	87.8 m (288 ft)	2011	Eddie Lampert	(Netherlands) Feadship		
117	Musashi	87.8 m (288 ft)	2011	Larry Ellison	(Netherlands) Feadship		
118	Arctic P	87.6 m (287 ft)	1989	James Packer	(Germany) Schichau Unterweser AG		
119	OceanXplorer	87.0 m (285.4 ft)	2010	Ray Dalio	(Spain) Freire Shipyard		
120	Eye	87.0 m (285 ft)	2012	Samvel Karapetyan	(Germany) Lürssen		
121	Lonian	87.0 m (285 ft)	2018	Lorenzo Fertitta	(Netherlands) Feadship		
122	Avantage	87.0 m (285 ft)	2020	Bulat Utemuratov	(Germany) Lürssen		
123	Quattroelle	86.1 m (282 ft)	2013	Majid Al Futtaim	(Germany) Lürssen		
124	Man of Steel	86.0 m (282 ft)	2011	Barry Zekelman	(Netherlands) Oceanco		
125	Kingdom 5KR	86.0 m (282 ft)	1980	Al-Waleed bin Talal Al Saud	(Italy) Benetti		
126	Chakra	86.0 m (282 ft)	1963		(Netherlands) Scheepswerf Gebr. van der Werf		
127	Ecstasea	86.0 m (282 ft)	2004	Alshair Fiyaz	(Netherlands) Feadship		
128	HBC	85.6 m (281 ft)	2008		(Germany) Abeking & Rasmussen		;
129	Aquila	85.6 m (281 ft)	2010	Ann Walton Kroenke	(United States) Derecktor Shipyards		
130	Amore Vero	87.36 m (287 ft)	2013	Igor Sechin (Note: Amore Vero is currently seized by the French government)	(Netherlands) Oceanco		
131	Vibrant Curiosity	85.5 m (281 ft)	2009	Reinhold Wuerth	(Netherlands) Oceanco		
132	Sunrays	85.5 m (281 ft)	2010	Ravi Ruia	(Netherlands) Oceanco		
133	Moonlight II	85.3 m (280 ft)	2005	Sultan bin Khalifa Al Nahyan	(Greece) Neorion		
134	Pacific X	85.2 m (280 ft)	2010	Leonid Mikhelson	(Germany) Lürssen		
135	Meridian A	85.1 m (279 ft)	2011	Sergey Chemezov (Note: Valerie is currently seized by the Spanish government)	(Germany) Lürssen		
136	Solandge	85.1 m (279 ft)	2013	Muqrin bin Abdulaziz Al Saud	(Germany) Lürssen		
137	Gigia	85.0 m (279 ft)	2017	Igor Makarov	(Germany) Lürssen		
138	O'Ptasia	85.0 m (279 ft)	2018	Paris Dragnis	(Greece) Golden Yachts Ltd.		
139	Bold	85.0 m (279 ft)	2019	Guido Krass	(Australia) Silver Yachts		
140	Victorious	85.0 m (279 ft)	2021	Vural Ak	(Turkey) Akyacht		
141	Wanderlust	85.0 m (279 ft)	2022	Yim Leak	(Australia) Silver Yachts		
142	Obsidian	84.2 m (276 ft)	2023		(Netherlands) Feadship		
143	White Rabbit	84.0 m (276 ft)	2018	Goh Cheng Liang	(Australia) Echo Yachts		
144	Savannah	83.5 m (274 ft)	2015	Lukas H. Lundin	(Netherlands) Feadship		
145	Genesis	82.9 m (272 ft)	2024		(Netherlands) Heesen Yachts		
146	Sakura	82.9 m (272 ft)	2024		(Netherlands) Feadship		
147	Talitha	82.6 m (271 ft)	1929	Mark Getty	(Germany) Germaniawerft		
148	Emir	82.5 m (271 ft)	1987		(Japan) Mitsubishi Heavy Industries		
149	Sea Pearl	82.5 m (271 ft)	2013	Sri Prakash Lohia	(Germany) Abeking & Rasmussen		
150	Basrah Breeze	82.0 m (269 ft)	1981	Government of Iraq	(Denmark) Helsingør Værft (Dutch Wiki)		
151	Ilona	82.0 m (269 ft)	2004	Frank Lowy	(Netherlands) Amels Holland B.V.		
152	Alfa Nero	82.0 m (269 ft)	2007		(Netherlands) Oceanco		
153	Pure	82.0 m (269 ft)	2008	Olivier Leclercq	(United Kingdom) Devonport Yachts		
154	Kosatka	82.0 m (269 ft)	2014	Vladimir Putin	(Germany) Blohm + Voss		
155	Haven	82.0 m (269 ft)	2024		(Germany) Lürssen		
156	Romea	81.8 m (268 ft)	2015	Alexander Nesis	(Germany) Abeking & Rasmussen		
157	Air	81.0 m (266 ft)	2011	Augusto Perfetti	(Netherlands) Feadship		
158	Grace	81.0 m (266 ft)	2014	John Reece	(Germany) Abeking & Rasmussen		
159	HNoMY Norge	80.2 m (263 ft)	1937	Harald V of Norway	(United Kingdom) Camper and Nicholsons		
160	Grand Ocean	80.2 m (263 ft)	1990	Nidal Karameh	(Germany) Blohm + Voss		
161	Constellation	80.0 m (262 ft)	1999	Hamad bin Khalifa Al Thani	(Netherlands) Oceanco		
162	Yasmine of The Sea	80.0 m (262 ft)	2001	Abdullah Al Thani	(Netherlands) Oceanco		
163	Batello	80.0 m (262 ft)	2006		(Netherlands) Oceanco		
164	Titan	80.0 m (262 ft)	2010	Alexander Abramov	(Germany) Abeking & Rasmussen		
165	Chopi Chopi	80.0 m (262 ft)	2013	Taha Mikati	(Italy) CRN Spa		
166	Elements	80.0 m (262 ft)	2019	Fahad al-Athel	(Turkey) Yachtley		
167	Excellence	80.0 m (262 ft)	2019	Herb Chambers	(Germany) Abeking & Rasmussen		
168	Artefact	80.0 m (262 ft)	2020	Mike Lazaridis	(Germany) Nobiskrug		
169	Tatiana	80.0 m (262 ft)	2020	Cyrus Pallonji Mistry	(Turkey) Bilgin Yachts		
170	Leona	80.0 m (262 ft)	2023	Saudi royal family	(Turkey) Bilgin Yachts		
171	Faith	80 m (262 ft)	2025	Lawrence Stroll	(Netherlands) Feadship		
172	Wingman	80 m (262 ft)	2022	Mark Zuckerberg	(Netherlands) Damen Yachts		
173	Dragon	79.9 m (262 ft)	2019		(Italy) Palumbo Superyachts		
174	Mimtee	79.4 m (260 ft)	2019	Najib Mikati	(Italy) CRN Spa		
175	SS Delphine	78.6 m (258 ft)	1921	Jacques Bruynooghe	(United States) Great Lakes Engineering Works		
176	Pegasus VIII	78.6 m (258 ft)	2003	Mohammed bin Salman Al Saud	(Denmark) Royal Denship		
177	Rocinante	78.5 m (258 ft)	2008	Gabe Newell	(Germany) Lürssen		
178	Hampshire II	78.5 m (258 ft)	2012	Jim Ratcliffe	(Netherlands) Feadship	Hampshire II	
179	Tueq	78.5 m (258 ft)	2002	Salman of Saudi Arabia	(Netherlands) Van der Giessen de Noord		
180	HDMY Dannebrog	78.4 m (257 ft)	1932	Frederik X of Denmark	(Denmark) Orlogsværftet		
181	Eminence	78.4 m (257 ft)	2008	Alexander Khloponin	(Germany) Abeking & Rasmussen		
182	Amaryllis	78.4 m (257 ft)	2011	Andrey Borodin	(Germany) Abeking & Rasmussen		
183	Platinum	78.29 m (257 ft)	2024		(Italy) Admiral Yachts		
184	Venus	78.2 m (257 ft)	2012	Laurene Powell Jobs	(Netherlands) Feadship		
185	Montkaj	78.0 m (256 ft)	1995	Muhammad bin Fahd Al Saud	(Netherlands) Amels Holland B.V.		
186	Energy	77.8 m (255 ft)	2022	Valeriy Khoroshkovskyi	(Netherlands) Amels Holland B.V.		
187	Tango	77.7 m (255 ft)	2011	Viktor Vekselberg (Note: Tango is currently seized by the Spanish government)	(Netherlands) Feadship		
188	Malia	77.7 m (255 ft)	2023		(Greece) Golden Yachts Ltd.		
189	Sea Ranger	77.4 m (254 ft)	1973	Peter Lewis	(Germany) Schichau Unterweser AG		
190	Pi	77.2 m (253 ft)	2019	Howard Schultz	(Netherlands) Feadship		
191	BRP Ang Pangulo	77.0 m (253 ft)	1959	President of the Republic of the Philippines	(Japan) IHI Corporation		
192	Sea Stallion	77.0 m (253 ft)	2012	Dubai royal family	(Australia) Silver Yachts		
193	Silver Fast	77.0 m (253 ft)	2015	Guido Krass	(Australia) Silver Yachts		
194	Legend	77.0 m (253 ft)	1974	Jan Verkerk	(Netherlands) IHC Verschure		
195	GO	77.0 m (253 ft)	2018	Hans-Peter Wild	(Turkey) Turquoise Yachts		
196	La Datcha	76.9 m (252 ft)	2020	Oleg Tinkov	(Netherlands) Damen Yachts		
197	Samar	76.9 m (252 ft)	2006	Kutayba Alghanim	(United Kingdom) Devonport Yachts		
198	Yersin	76.6 m (251 ft)	2015	Francois Fiat	(France) Piriou		
199	Boardwalk	76.5 m (251 ft)	2021	Tilman Fertitta	(Netherlands) Feadship		
200	Lady Sarya	76.3 m (250 ft)	1972	Ahmed Zaki Yamani	(Italy) Nuovi Cantieri Apuania S.p.A.		
201	Alvia	76.05 m (250 ft)	2024	Philippe Casanovas	(Netherlands) Feadship		
202	Ebony Shine	76.0 m (249 ft)	2009	Teodoro Nguema Obiang Mangue	(Netherlands) Feadship		
203	Huntress	75.6 m (248 ft)	2009	George Argyros	(Germany) Lürssen		
204	Reborn	75.5 m (248 ft)	1999	Gabriele Volpi	(Netherlands) Amels Holland B.V.		
205	Wheels	75.5 m (248 ft)	2008	Ralf Schmid	(Netherlands) Oceanco		
206	Kenshō	75.18 m (247 ft)	2022	Udo Mueller	(Italy) Admiral Yachts		
207	Meserret III	75.0 m (246 ft)	1992	Mehmet Ömer Koç	(Germany) Peene-Werft		
208	Planet Nine	75.0 m (246 ft)	2018	Nathaniel Rothschild	(Italy) Admiral Yachts		
209	Arrow	75.0 m (246 ft)	2020	Michael Platt	(Netherlands) Feadship		
210	Abeona	75.0 m (246 ft)	2023	Jeff Bezos	(Netherlands) Damen Yachts		
211	Infinite Jest	75.0 m (246 ft)	2023		(Turkey) Turquoise Yachts		

== Notes ==
Yacht seizures

Following the 2022 Russian invasion of Ukraine, many countries announced sanctions against Russia and Russian President Vladimir Putin, along with a group of men known as Russian oligarchs, that are close friends as well as business and political allies of Putin. The sanctions have led to the seizure of their bank accounts and properties through civil forfeiture, (outside of Russia and non-participating countries), including yachts, private jets, expensive artworks, luxury homes, etc., alleging these assets to be the proceeds of crime. All these assets are to be auctioned off, for the benefit of the people of Ukraine.

Misc. notes

^{[Note 1]}Atlantis II and Navtilvs were built as part of a trio of sister ships, though the third was never completed.

== See also ==
- List of yacht support vessels by length
- List of large sailing yachts
- Luxury yacht tender
