= Monaco Yacht Show =

Trade show in Monaco

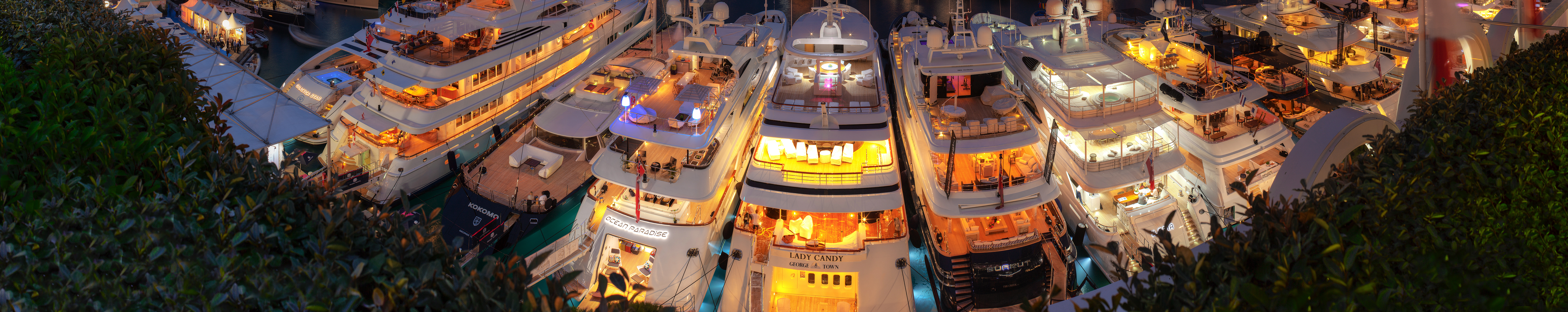
- Monaco Yacht Show in 2013
- Genre: Luxury yacht
- Frequency: Annually
- Locations: Port Hercules, Monaco
- Inaugurated: 1991
- Founder: Maurice Cohen
- Participants: 580+
- Attendance: 30,000+
- Organiser: Informa
- Website: monacoyachtshow.com/en/

The Monaco Yacht Show (MYS) is an annual trade show in Monaco, organised by the British events and publishing company, Informa. It was launched in 1991 as a broker-oriented event focused on superyachts over 20 m (66 ft) in length. It is held in Port Hercules, and is Europe's biggest in-water display of large yachts.

In addition to the estimated 125 yachts on display, over 580 exhibitors including brokerage companies, superyacht builders, yacht designers, luxury brands, and luxury automobile companies participate in the event.

Throughout the four-day event, there are over 150 private events including press features conferences, receptions and product presentations.

In 2020, Informa cancelled the show due to the world wide COVID-19 pandemic.

== History ==
The Monaco Yacht Show was founded in 1991 and organized by the French entrepreneur Maurice Cohen. In 1994, the rights to the event were sold to IIR, a management company that also held the rights to the Superyacht de Nice event.

After attendance issues, IIR decided to focus the Monaco Yacht Show on superyachts, featuring boats range that from approximately 20 m (66 ft) to 90 m (300 ft) in length, and repurposed its event in Nice as a trade show.

The event grew to host 65 yachts in 2002 and attracted nearly 15,000 visitors. In 2005, IIR was acquired by the British event organizer Informa for $1.4 billion.

By 2016, the event had more than doubled its 2002 attendance numbers and increased the number of yachts in Port Hercules to 125. That same year, the Monaco Yacht Show debuted an exhibition space for luxury automobiles called Car Deck.

The Car Deck exhibition has included automobiles from Aston Martin, Bentley, Hemmels, Lamborghini, McLaren, and Mercedes-Benz. In 2017, there was an estimated €4.5 billion value in yachts in Monaco during the event.

The 2024 Monaco Yacht Show featured two of the largest yachts ever displayed, Kismet and Golden Odyssey, both built by Lürssen

== Notable yachts ==
- Illusion 1
- Project Sunrise
- ROCK.IT
- Infinity
- Thumper
- Anyuta
- Jubilee
- O'Mega
- Kismet
- Renaissance
- Legend
