= Ocean Independence =

Yacht brokerage company

Ocean Independence AG
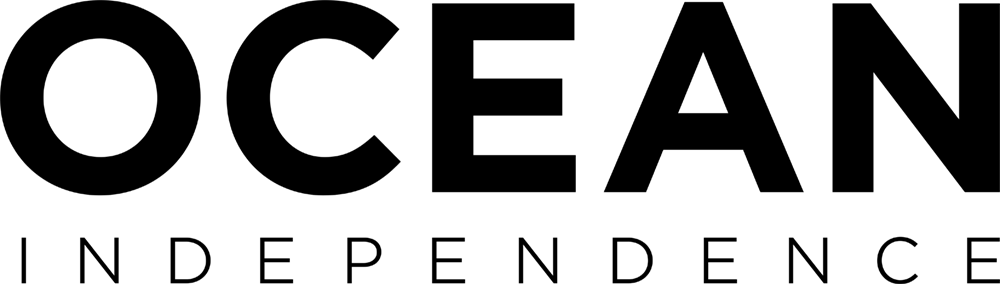
- Company type: Aktiengesellschaft
- Industry: Yachting
- Predecessor: Ocean Cruise
- Founded: 1991
- Founder: Peter Hürzeler
- Headquarters: Küsnacht, Zurich, Switzerland
- Number of locations: 16 (2025)
- Area served: Worldwide
- Key people: Peter Hürzeler (founder & CEO)
- Services: Yacht Sales and Purchases, Yacht Charter Retail, Yacht Charter Management, Yacht Services, New Construction and Refit Management, Consulting, Private Aviation
- Website: https://www.oceanindependence.com

Ocean Independence is a yacht brokerage firm that provides luxury yachting services across yacht sales, yacht charter, management, and build. The company is headquartered in Küsnacht, Zurich, Switzerland.

== History ==
=== Early years ===
Ocean Independence, initially established as Ocean Cruise, was founded in 1991. Ocean Cruise’s origins trace back to the mid-1980s, when Peter Hürzeler, his brother, and a group of friends built and operated some of the first commercially registered sailing yachts for charter. In the mid-1990s, when they decided to sell the fleet, Peter Hürzeler continued Ocean Cruise and started to focus on the brokerage and consultancy business in Zollikon, Zurich.

=== Expansion ===
In 1999, Ocean Cruise opened an office in Monaco and four years later in Palma, Mallorca. In 2005, the firm expanded through the acquisition of Velonà Yachting, a Monaco-based brokerage house, and subsequently merged with Sea Independence (formerly Dahm International), a brokerage house in Palma, forming the Ocean Independence brand known today. Through this expansion the company increased its workforce from 22 to 45 people. That same year, Nicholas Dean joined Ocean Cruise as a Managing Partner. One year later, in 2006, the company officially launched its dedicated yacht management services.

To further expand, Ocean Independence acquired Cavendish White, a British brokerage house based in London, in 2008. This acquisition increased the company’s workforce to 70 people and expanded its reach in the UK market. In 2011, the acquisition of Primo Yacht, a yacht charter firm based in Antibes (France), expanded Ocean Independence’s role in charter fleet management

In 2015, Ocean Independence expanded its operations by establishing a U.S. charter and sales office in Fort Lauderdale, Florida. The same year, the company relocated its global headquarters from Zollikon (Zurich) to Küsnacht (Zurich), revised its brand identity and launched a lifestyle magazine called PURSUIT. Two years later, in 2017, Ocean Independence acquired the Hong Kong-based brokerage company Seanergy.

== Services ==
Ocean Independence specializes in crewed motor and sailing yachts over 18 meters. While the company does not own any yachts itself, it acts as an intermediary on behalf of its clients. Its core services include representing clients in yacht sales and purchases, yacht ownership management, charter management and retail as well as overseeing the construction and refit process of yachts.

=== Prominent Sales ===
Ocean Independence sells yachts worth several hundred million euros every year. According to the firm's own claims, Ocean Independence has sold over 500 yachts since its founding in the 1990s and generated a total yacht sales revenue of 4 billion euros. Some prominent yacht sales from the past include:

- Alfa (70m, Benetti, sold in 2024)
- Azteca (72m, CRN, sold in 2021)
- Pegasus V (now Pegasus VIII) (77m, Royal Denship, sold in 2014)
- Reverie (70m, Benetti, sold in 2013)
- Sunrise (90m, Nuovi Cantieri Apuania, sold in 2011)
- Haida G (71m, Krupp Germany, sold in 2011)
- Nomad (70m, Oceanfast, sold in 2010)
- Hebridean Spirit (90m, Nuovi Cantieri Apuania, sold in 2009)
- Annaliesse (now Delma) (85m, Neorion, sold in 2007)
