= List of yachts built by Bilgin Yachts =

This is a list of all the yachts built by Bilgin Yachts, sorted by year.

Biggest by both length and volume upon completion
Biggest by length upon completion
Biggest by volume upon completion

== Table ==
| Year | Size | | Name | | Reference |
| Year | Length (LOA) | Volume | Original | Current (Note: As of 10 November 2022) | Reference |
|---|---|---|---|---|---|
| 2002 | 30 m (98 ft) | 140 GT | Questa E La Vita | | |
| 2002 | 30 m (98 ft) | 140 GT | Sevsin | | |
| 2003 | 34 m (112 ft) | 230 GT | Derin 2 | M-Irafish | |
| 2004 | 27.94 m (92 ft) | 115 GT | Erdogan | | |
| 2005 | 30 m (98 ft) | 140 GT | Sun-Set | April | |
| 2002 | 32 m (105 ft) | 140 GT | Dodo | Vedo B | |
| 2006 | 30 m (98 ft) | 140 GT | Imperatore | Mia Kai | |
| 2006 | 33.30 m (109 ft) | 148 GT | Tatiana | | |
| 2007 | 36 m (118 ft) | 195 GT | Star Sapphire | Christina B | |
| 2007 | 33.50 m (110 ft) | 128 GT | Je T'Aime Too | Silence | |
| 2008 | 33.70 m (111 ft) | 165 GT | D'Angleterre | | |
| 2010 | 37.60 m (123 ft) | 261 GT | Noor | RL Noor | |
| 2010 | 33.53 m (110 ft) | 163 GT | Madness | Good Vibes | |
| 2010 | 39 m (128 ft) | 247 GT | Indiana | | |
| 2010 | 37.40 m (123 ft) | 226 GT | Tee-Dje | | |
| 2011 | 45 m (148 ft) | 388 GT | Tatiana | Tatiana I | |
| 2012 | 40.30 m (132 ft) | 290 GT | M | Ocean Club | |
| 2012 | 48.70 m (160 ft) | 334 GT | M&M | Fly me to the Moon | |
| 2014 | 45 m (148 ft) | 388 GT | Elada | | |
| 2015 | 51.80 m (170 ft) | 795 GT | Dusur | | |
| 2015 | 48.70 m (160 ft) | 344 GT | Clarity | | |
| 2016 | 46.80 m (154 ft) | 496 GT | Giaola-Lu | | |
| 2017 | 47.50 m (156 ft) | 496 GT | Nerissa | Starburst III | |
| 2019 | 47.40 m (156 ft) | 499 GT | Lilium | Moonraker | |
| 2020 | 80 m (262 ft) | 1,689 GT | Tatiana | | |
| 2022 | 80 m (262 ft) | 1,730 GT | Leona | | |
| 2024 | 50 m (164 ft) | 498 GT | Eternal Spark | | |
| 2025 | 50 m (164 ft) | 499 GT | Camila | | |
| 2025 | 80 m (262 ft) | 1,755 GT | Project Silence | Al Reem | |

== Under construction ==
| Planned delivery | Length (LOA) | Name | Reference |
|---|---|---|---|
| 2024 | 74 m (243 ft) | Bilgin 243 #1 | |
| TBA | 86 m (282 ft) | TBA | |
| TBA | 52 m (171 ft) | TBA | |
| TBA | 52 m (171 ft) | TBA | |

== See also ==
- List of motor yachts by length
- Luxury yacht
