= List of yachts built by CRN S.p.A. =

This is a list of all the yachts built by CRN S.p.A., sorted by year.

Was the longest yacht upon completion.

== 1969–1999 ==
Year	Length overall in meters	Name	Reference
1969	38.61	Mar	
1970	26.82	Hiilani	
1972	27.69	Ocean Falcon	
1972	26.82	Hathor	
1973	28.20	Gold	
1973	34.44	Maranatha	
1974	30.82	A & A	
1974	30.80	Active Gazella	
1975	28.56	Mi Alma	
1975	39.60	Resina	
1976	28.60	Oceane II	
1976	40	Ava	
1977	39	Monaco	
1978	37.19	Nordic Star	
1978	30.52	Vespucci	
1978	46.20	Dubai Ocean Star	
1979	46.88	Dubai Queen II	
1979	38.93	Sylviana	
1979	39.70	Parvati	
1980	52.43	Wind of Fortune	
1980	32.25	La Alteana	
1981	52.80	Shaf	
1982	42.80	Anmad	
1982	42.80	Tyndareo	
1983	32.50	Argolide	
1983	32.90	F-100	
1984	55.30	Achilles	
1985	48.88	Jameel	
1986	37.50	Mister P	
1987	45	Bella Stella	
1987	61.20	Il Vagabondo	
1987	45.20	All Seven	
1988	47.80	Azzurra II	
1990	49.95	Maracunda	
1991	68	Alwaeli	
1994	40.01	AquaLibrium 1	
1996	48.20	Azul V	
1997	49.95	Sahab IV	
1998	49.77	Dr No No	

== 2000–2009 ==
Year	Length overall in meters	Name	Reference
2000	61.50	Katharine	
2001	43	Magenta M	
2004	39.60	Ariela	
2004	46	Cacique	
2005	39.60	Bunker	
2005	46	Eight	
2006	39.60	Agatha	
2006	54.20	Alouette II	
2006	60	Constance	
2007	39.60	Sima	
2007	42.60	Emotion 2	
2007	54.20	Maraya	
2008	42.60	Megalodon	
2008	42.60	Hana	
2008	56.50	Royal Rubin	
2009	39.60	Libertas	
2009	60	Tacanuyaso M.S.	
2009	59.50	Blue Eyes London	
2009	42.60	Sofico	

== 2010–2019 ==
Year	Length overall in meters	Name	Reference
2010	42.60	Eviva	
2010	42.60	Avant Garde	
2010	72	Azteca	
2010	59.50	Ramble on Rose	
2011	39.60	5G	
2011	42.60	Juna Too	
2011	59.50	Light Holic	
2013	58.20	J'ade	
2013	80	Chopi Chopi	
2013	42.60	Only Eighty	
2014	61.30	Saramour	
2014	73	Yalla	
2015	54.80	Atlante	
2017	74	Lady Jorgia	
2018	49.80	Latona	
2019	79.45	Mimtee	

== 2020–present ==
Year	Length overall in meters	Name	Reference
2020	61.9	Voice	

== Under construction ==
Planned delivery	Length overall in meters	Name	Reference
2021	62	CRN 138	
2022	70	CRN 139	
2022	60	CRN 141	
2022	52	CRN 142	
TBA	45	Project 45m AlfaRosso	
TBA	50	Project 50m AlfaRosso	
TBA	55	Project 55m AlfaRosso	

== See also ==
- List of motor yachts by length
- Luxury yacht
