= Somnio =

Somnio may refer to:

- Somnio (yacht), the first "yacht liner"
- Infinity Chamber, a 2016 American science fiction film
