= Maryah =

Superyacht built in 2014

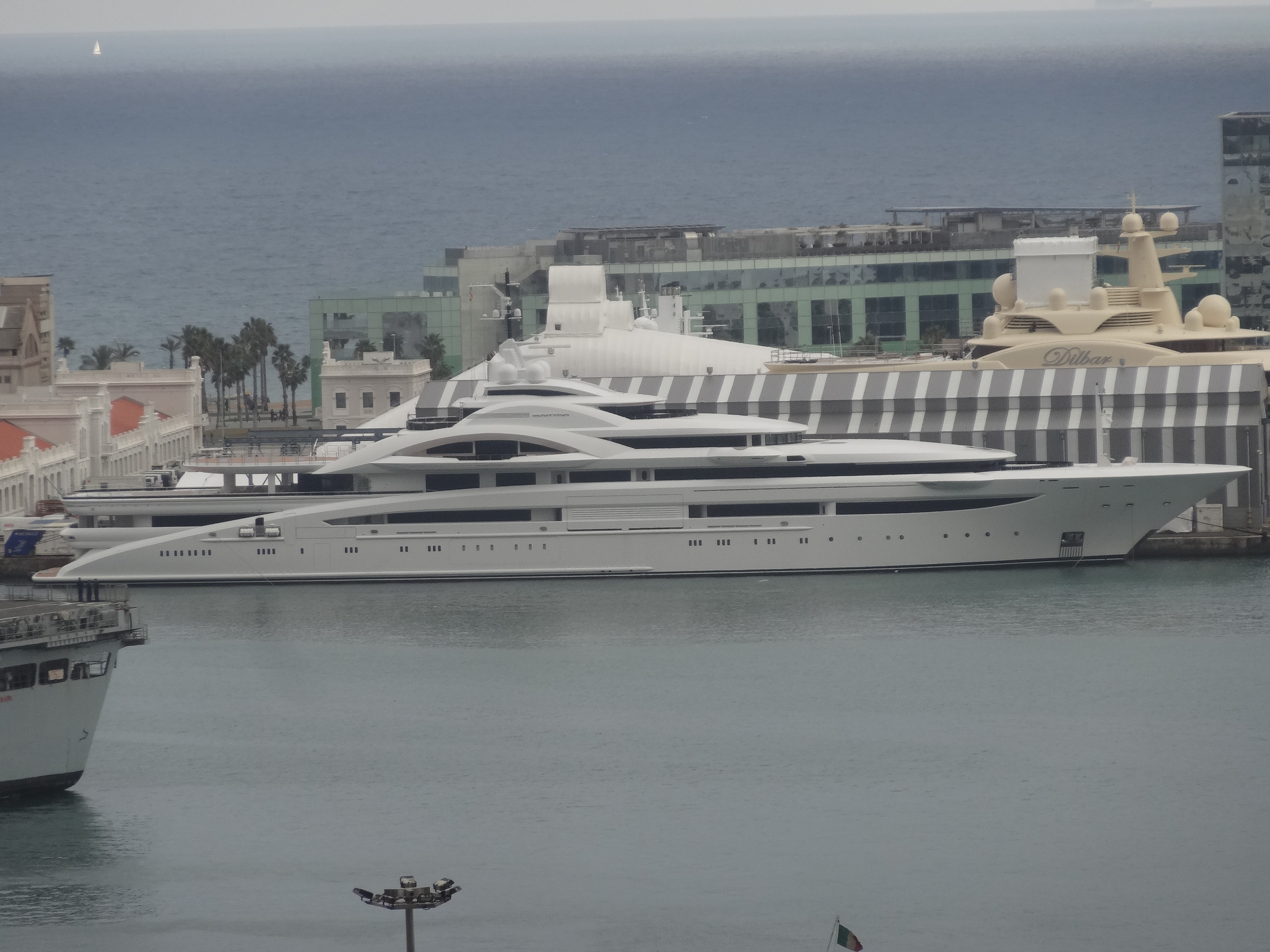
- Maryah in Barcelona, 2016

History
- Name: Maryah
- Owner: Tahnoun bin Zayed Al Nahyan
- Port of registry: Cayman Islands
- Builder: Szczecin Shipyard (original hull) Elefsis Shipyards (conversion)
- Identification: IMO number: 9044619; MMSI number: 319068600

General characteristics
- Class & type: Motor yacht; conversion
- Tonnage: 5,650 GT
- Length: 125 m (410 ft)
- Beam: 17 m (56 ft)
- Draught: 5.6 m (18 ft)
- Capacity: 54
- Crew: 60

Maryah is a 125.0 meters (410 ft) long motor yacht owned by Tahnoun bin Zayed Al Nahyan of Abu Dhabi. A former Soviet research ship, she was launched in 1990 and retrofited into a luxury yacht between 2007 and 2015.

== History ==
Maryah was launched as a Soviet research ship in 1990 from the Szczecin Shipyard in Poland. At launch, she was named Dalmorgeologiya but she was later renamed Fortune.

In 2009, H2 Yacht Design was commissioned to design a retrofit of the craft. At the time, her name was Czar with the project known as Project Czar. In September 2014, it was announced she would be christened Maryah.

She was converted at the Elefsis Shipyards and launched in 2015 as a superyacht. Her interior was delivered by Genesis Yachtline of Fort Lauderdale, Florida while the naval architecture was done by Naos S.r.l. of Trieste.

== Sightings ==
Maryah began sea trials in Greece in October 2014 and, in March 2015, was seen at Porto Montenegro in Tivat. She completed her maiden voyage in Livorno, Italy in April 2015. In May 2015, she was spotted in the French Riviera. In 2019, she was again spotted in Porto Montenegro. In 2023, she was spotted in Gibraltar en route for a retrofit. The refit was completed by NCA Refit in 2024.

== See also ==
- List of motor yachts by length
