= Boardwalk (disambiguation) =

A boardwalk is a pedestrian walkway. It can also refer to an entertainment district on an oceanfront.

Boardwalk or The Boardwalk may refer to:

== Arts and entertainment ==
- Boardwalk (film), a 1979 film starring Ruth Gordon, Lee Strasberg and Janet Leigh
- Boardwalk, the most expensive property in Monopoly (game)
- Boardwalk Empire, American HBO period political crime drama television series, set in Atlantic City during the 1920s

== Businesses ==
- Boardwalk (music club), in Manchester, England
- Boardwalk (nightclub), a former nightclub and live music venue in Sheffield, Yorkshire
- Boardwalk Books, a Canadian publisher acquired by Dundurn Press
- Boardwalk Hall, an arena and U.S. National Historic Landmark in Atlantic City, New Jersey
- Boardwalk Hotel and Casino, a former establishment in Las Vegas, Nevada
- Boardwalk Pipeline Partners, an energy company based in Houston, Texas
- Boardwalk Records, a record label
- Disney's BoardWalk Resort, Walt Disney World Resort, Greater Orlando area, Florida
- Boardwalk Fun Park, an amusement park in Grand Prairie, Texas, that closed in 1992
- The Boardwalk, a themed area of Knott's Berry Farm, Buena Park, California
- The Boardwalk at Coney Island, a Thor Equities proposed resort development in 2009
- Coney Island Hot Dog Stand, roadside attraction formerly known as The Boardwalk at Coney Island, in Colorado
- The Boardwalk at Hersheypark, a themed area of Hersheypark in Hershey, Pennsylvania
- Santa Cruz Beach Boardwalk, an amusement park located in Santa Cruz, California
- The Boardwalk at Bricktown, a proposed development including Legends Tower in Bricktown, Oklahoma City, Oklahoma

== Sports ==
- Boardwalk Brown (1889-1977), American Major League Baseball pitcher
- Boardwalk Bowl, a post-season college football game held in Atlantic City, New Jersey

== Ships ==
- Boardwalk, a superyacht built by Lurssen in 2026

== Streets ==
- Boardwalk, a prominent location and street address in Atlantic City, New Jersey

== See also ==
- Under the Boardwalk, a pop song recorded by The Drifters in 1964
