= Ocean Victory (yacht) =

2014 megayacht

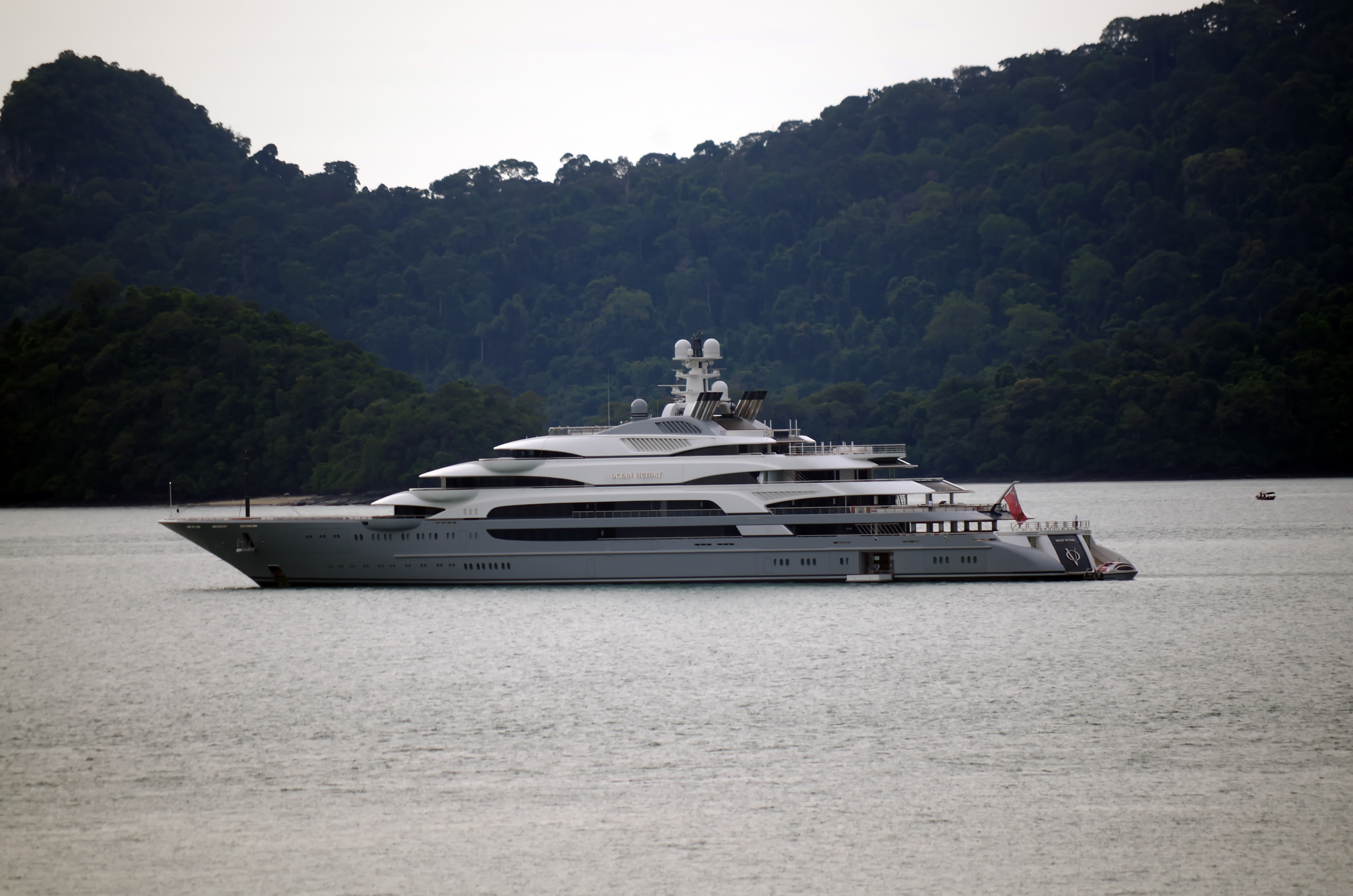

History

Italy
- Name: Ocean Victory
- Owner: Victor Rashnikov
- Ordered: 2010
- Builder: Fincantieri
- Yard number: 6218
- Launched: 22 April 2014
- Completed: 2014

General characteristics
- Length: 140 metres

Ocean Victory is a Fincantieri super yacht, designed by Espen Øino (Oeino) and Alberto Pinto. At 140m long she was at the time of her construction one of the top 10 largest yachts in the world. She is reported to have seven decks, a helipad, six pools, and can accommodate a 14m tender in a floodable garage. She can accommodate 36 guests.

On March 13, 2016, a crew member of the yacht was fatally injured during anchoring maneuvers when the yacht was near Koh Tachai in the Similan Islands National Park, Thailand. The cause of the accident was determined to be the failure of a windlass brake, causing the anchor chain to run out uncontrollably, with the loose end of the chain striking the officer and causing fatal leg injuries.

In 2018, she was owned by Russian billionaire Viktor Rashnikov. In March 2022, Forbes reported that the yacht Ocean Victory was still owned by Victor Rashnikov. At 459 feet, it was registered in the Cayman Islands with a value of $294 million. At that time, it had been sanctioned by the EU, UK, Canada, Switzerland, and Australia. It was recorded in Malé, Maldives on March 1, 2022. That month, its location transponders were switched off, with the location becoming unknown to authorities.
