= Pegasus VIII =

Yacht built in Denmark

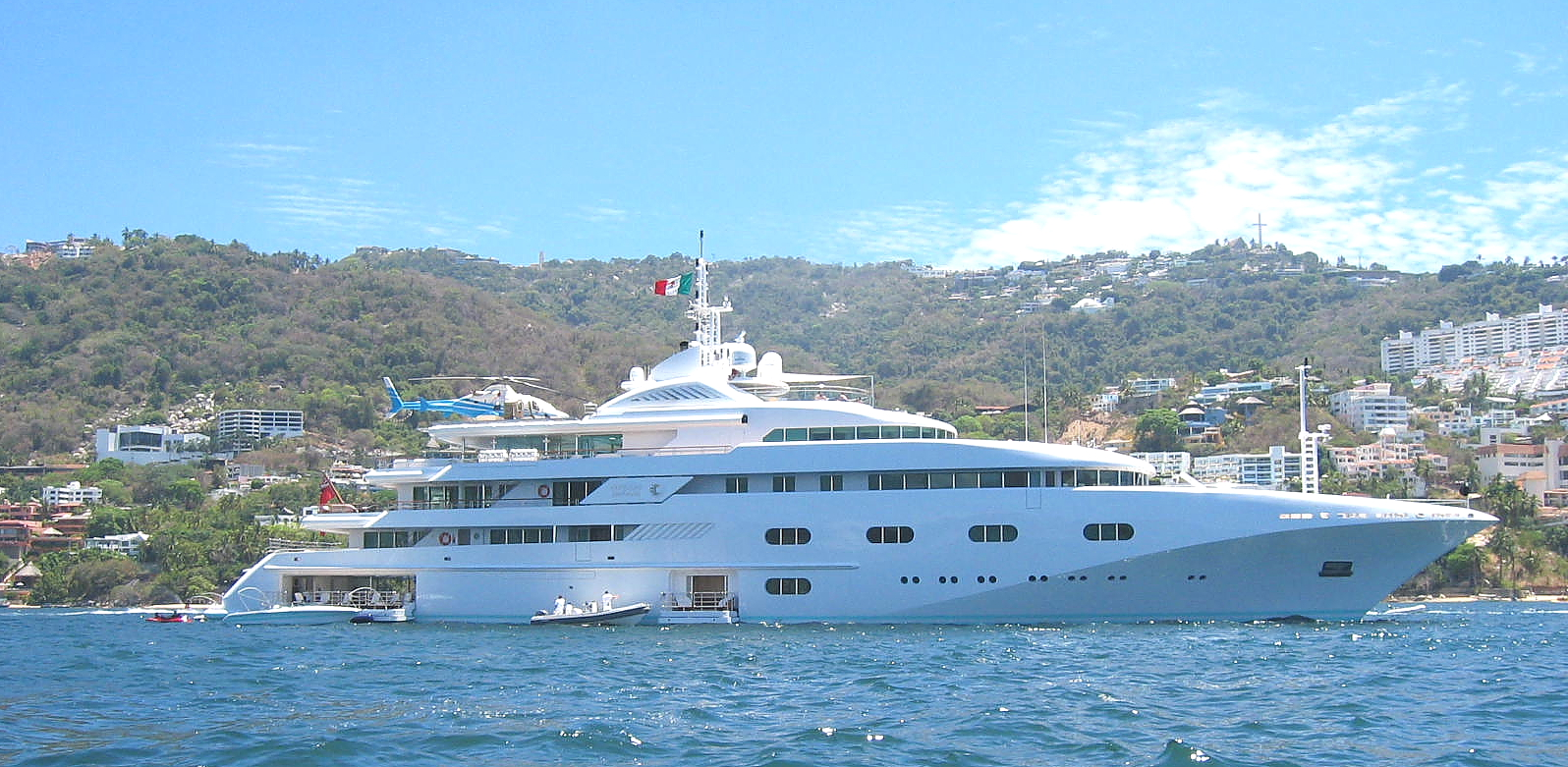
- Pegasus V in Acapulco in 2004

History
- Name: Pegasus VIII
- Builder: Royal Denship
- Launched: 10 May 2002
- Notes: Call sign: ZCND3; IMO number: 1007794; MMSI number: 319961000

General characteristics
- Class & type: Luxury yacht
- Length: 78.60 m (257.9 ft)
- Beam: 14.40 m (47.2 ft)
- Draft: 4.50 m (14.8 ft)
- Propulsion: 2 x Deutz V12M SB 628 MWMs
- Speed: 17 knots (31 km/h; 20 mph) (maximum); 16 knots (30 km/h; 18 mph) (cruising)
- Capacity: 12 passengers
- Crew: 26 crew members

Pegasus VIII (formerly Pegasus V, formerly Princess Mariana) is a yacht originally built for Carlos Peralta, head of lusacell (now AT&T Mexico). The yacht was ordered in 2002 at the Danyard A/S Frederikshavn shipyard in Denmark. One year later Princess Mariana was delivered by Royal Denship. In 2006 she was the 33rd largest yacht in the world.

== Design ==
Pegasus V has a length of 78.60 m (257.9 ft), beam of 14.40 m (47.2 ft) and draft of 4.50 m (14.8 ft). The yacht is driven by two main engines Deutz V12M SB 628 MWMs, which are giving enough power for the yacht to reach maximum speed of 17 knots (31 km/h; 20 mph).

== Sales ==
In 2008 it was listed for sale for €125,000,000. That amount was reduced to €98,000,000 in 2009. May 2011 saw the sale of Princess Mariana at an asking price of $98,000,000. Following the transaction, she was renamed Pegasus V and made available for charter. The selling price was reduced $6 million to $88 million in 2013. Ronald Tutor acquired the ship and later sold it in 2015 to Mohammed Bin Salman who christened her Pegasus VIII.

== See also ==
- List of motor yachts by length
