= Jason-class tank landing ship =

Greek naval ship class

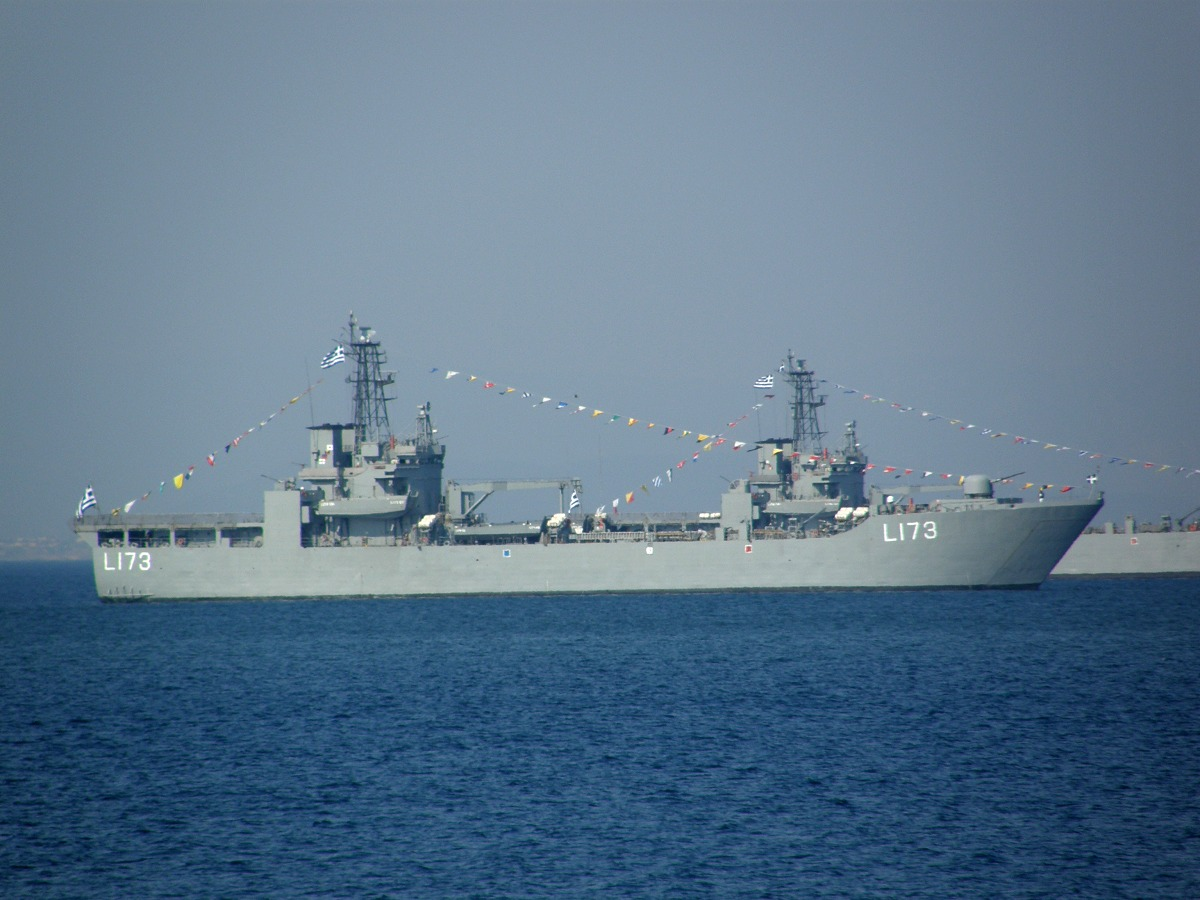
- HS Chios

Class overview
- Builders: Elefsis Shipyards, Greece
- Operators: Hellenic Navy
- Built: 1993–2000
- In commission: 1994–present
- Planned: 6
- Completed: 5
- Canceled: 1
- Active: 5 (2018)

General characteristics
- Type: Landing ship tank
- Displacement: 4,470 tons full load
- Length: 116 m (380 ft 7 in)
- Beam: 15.3 m (50 ft 2 in)
- Draught: 3.4 m (11 ft 2 in)
- Propulsion: 2 shafts, 2 Wärtsilä Nohab 16V25 diesels; 9,200 hp(m) (6.76 MW) sustained
- Speed: 16 knots (30 km/h; 18 mph)
- Range: 4,700 nmi (8,700 km; 5,400 mi) at 16 knots
- Boats & landing craft carried: 4 x LCVP 36-F Fast Landing Crafts
- Troops: 350
- Complement: 120
- Sensors & processing systems: Radars: Thomson-CSF (now Thales) TRS-3030 Triton 2D surface to air & surface to surface G-band radar; Fire control: Thomson-CSF Pollux TRS3220 I/J-band monopulse radar; Navigation: Kelvin Hughes Type 1007 (I-band); Thomson-CSF Vega II weapons control and tactical data system
- Electronic warfare & decoys: Mark 36 SRBOC chaff and decoy launching system
- Armament: 1 x Oto Melara 76 mm/62 Mod 9 compact gun; 2 x 40 mm/L 70 Breda-Bofors guns on Type 564 naval mounts; 2 x twin Rheinmetall Rh202 20 mm
- Aviation facilities: 1 helipad for medium sized helicopter

The Jason-class tank landing ship (Hellenic: αρματαγωγό κλάσσης Ιάσων, literally tank-carrier of class Jason) is a class of tank landing ships (LSTs) designed and built in Greece through a cooperation of the Elefsis Shipyards with the National Technical University of Athens and the Hellenic Navy, which ordered the ships in 1986. Along with the Zubr-class LCAC, they are the primary amphibious warfare ships of the Hellenic Navy. The first was laid down on 18 April 1987, second in September 1987, third in May 1988, fourth in April 1989 and fifth in November 1989. Completion of all five and in particular the last three was severely delayed by the shipyard's financial problems, which was privatised in October 1997. Greece tried to start building a sixth ship in 2000 but cancelled it before construction began.

The ships are capable of transporting 350 infantry troops, but they can transport up to 1,200 infantry for short distances, and they can also carry up to 22 main battle tanks (MBTs) or a variety of other equipment such as armoured personnel carriers (APCs), howitzers, MLRS launchers, trucks, etc.

The Hellenic Navy used the Jason-class ships to replace older American landing ships from the Second World War era. The Hellenic Navy preferred to not buy new ships from other nations in order to acquire experience in the design and construction of warships entirely in Greece.

Although the new ships replaced Second World War-era LSTs, the Hellenic Navy did not equip the Jason-class ships with marine fighting vehicles (such as BMP-3F) and therefore Greek marines have to use tactical landing methods similar to those of the Second World War era. The ships also use two types of Landing Craft Vehicle Personnel (LCVPs): the type 36 and the type 36F (with F meaning Fast).

== Ships ==
Pennant number	Ship	Namesake	Builder	Commissioned	Status
L173	Chios (Hellenic: Χίος)	Chios	Elefsis Shipyards	1996	In service
L174	Samos (Hellenic: Σάμος)	Samos	Elefsis Shipyards	1994	In service
L175	Ikaria (Hellenic: Ικαρία)	Ikaria	Elefsis Shipyards	1999	In service
L176	Lesvos (Hellenic: Λέσβος)	Lesbos	Elefsis Shipyards	1999	In service
L177	Rodos (Hellenic: Ρόδος)	Rhodes	Elefsis Shipyards	2000	In service

== Armament and sensors ==
Each ship of the class is armed with one Oto Melara 76 mm/62 Mod 9 compact naval gun, two Breda 40 mm/70 guns and two smaller Rheinmetall 20 mm guns in twin mounts. A serious drawback of the ships is the lack of a modern CIWS system.

The main radar of the ships is the Thomson-CSF TRS-3030 Triton G which is a G-band, 2D Surface-to-Air & Surface-to-Surface Radar. The ships have installed the Thomson-CSF Vega II command and control system which includes the Pollux TRS3220 fast-scanning radar as a fire control radar system.
