= Force Blue =

Motor yacht launched in 2002

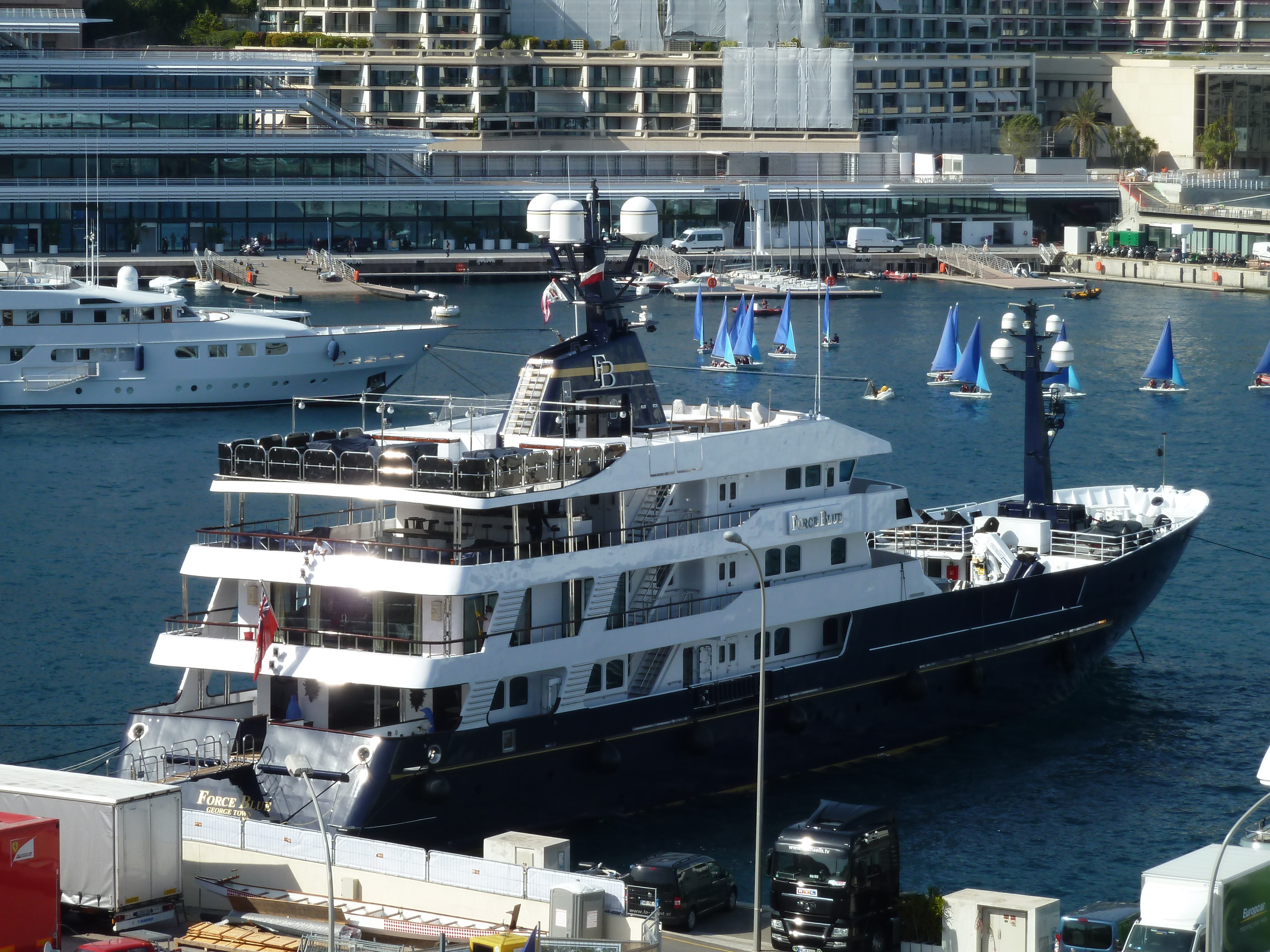
- Force Blue

History
- Name: Force Blue
- Owner: Flavio Briatore
- Builder: Royal Denship
- Launched: 2002
- Sponsored by: Roy Speer
- Homeport: Cayman Islands
- Identification: IMO number: 1007524; MMSI number: 319743000; Callsign: ZCGU8
- Status: Operational, for charter

General characteristics
- Class & type: Lloyds Register
- Type: Yacht
- Length: 70.6 m (232 ft)
- Beam: 11.38 m (37.3 ft)
- Draft: 2.95 m (9.7 ft)
- Installed power: 4,000 hp (3,000 kW)
- Propulsion: 2 × 2000 hp Caterpillar Inc.
- Speed: Max:17 knots (31 km/h; 20 mph); Cruise:14 knots (26 km/h; 16 mph)
- Crew: 17

Force Blue (formerly Big Roi) is a trawler-expedition style luxury yacht built by Royal Denship in 2002.

== Design ==
Built in 2002 by Royal Denship, she was designed by Ole Steen Knudsen and Tom Fexas as part of Royal Denship's "expedition" series, that included Turmoil and Big Aron. She was commissioned by Roy Speer, the founder and owner of the Home Shopping Network.

== Briatore ==
Purchased from Speer by Italian motorsports entrepreneur Flavio Briatore for £68.2m, she was given a refitted interior designed by Celeste Dell'Anna, and given a blue exterior.

Force Blue was seized by Italian Customs in May 2010 in La Spezia, near Genoa. On the authority of a local prosecutor, the state claims that the vessel's owners, Autumn Sailing Ltd, that there was outstanding Value Added Tax owing which should have been paid on the fuel used by the yacht. The amount evaded was estimated to be around five million euros.

== See also ==
- Yachting
