= I Dynasty =

Superyacht built in 2015

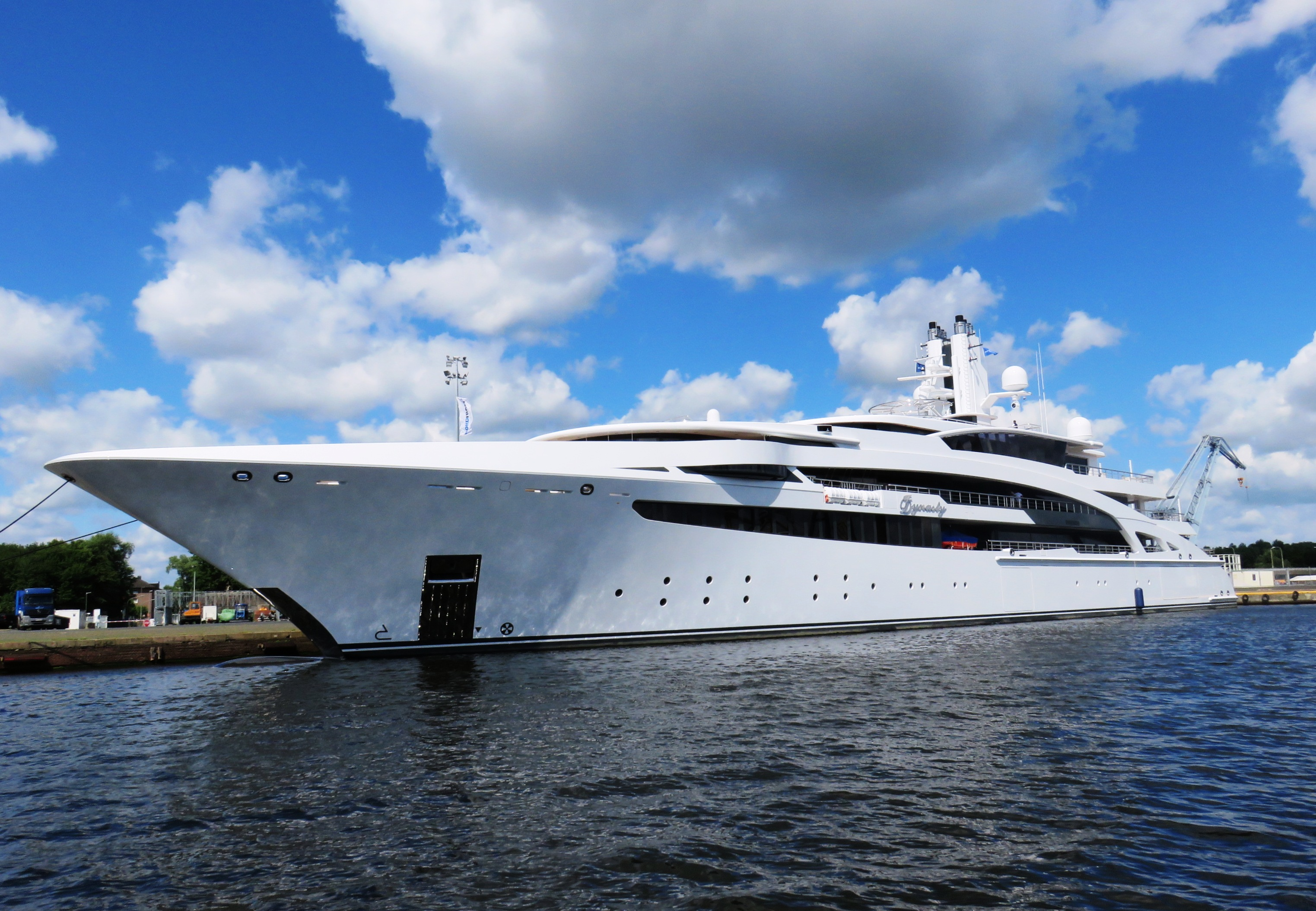

History

Cayman Islands
- Name: I Dynasty
- Owner: Alijan Ibragimov
- Builder: Kusch Yachts
- Yard number: 691
- Launched: 5 November 2014
- Completed: 2015
- Identification: IMO number: 9657545; MMSI number: 218354000; Callsign: ZGEF5

General characteristics
- Class & type: Motor yacht
- Tonnage: 4.300 gross tons
- Length: 100.8 m (331 ft)
- Beam: 16 m (52 ft)
- Draught: 5.5 m (18 ft)
- Speed: 14 knots (26 km/h) (Cruising); 17 knots (31 km/h) (maximum)
- Capacity: 22 persons
- Crew: 30 persons

I Dynasty is a superyacht launched on 5 November 2014 at the German Kusch Yachts shipyard and delivered in the year 2015. She was built as Project V853. I Dynasty is built under project management of Vega Yachts, and is designed by The A Group, while Studio Massari is responsible for her interior.

== Design ==
The length of the yacht is 100.8 m (331 ft) and the beam is 16 m (52 ft). The draught of I Dynasty is 5.5 m (18 ft). The hull is built out of steel while the material of the superstructure is made out of Aluminium with teak laid decks. The yacht classed by Lloyd's Register and flagged in the Cayman Islands. Dynasty was the first yacht to undergo hibernation at the IGY Málaga Marina in Málaga, Spain

== See also ==
- Motor yacht
- List of motor yachts by length
