= Nero (yacht) =

Motor yacht, built 2007

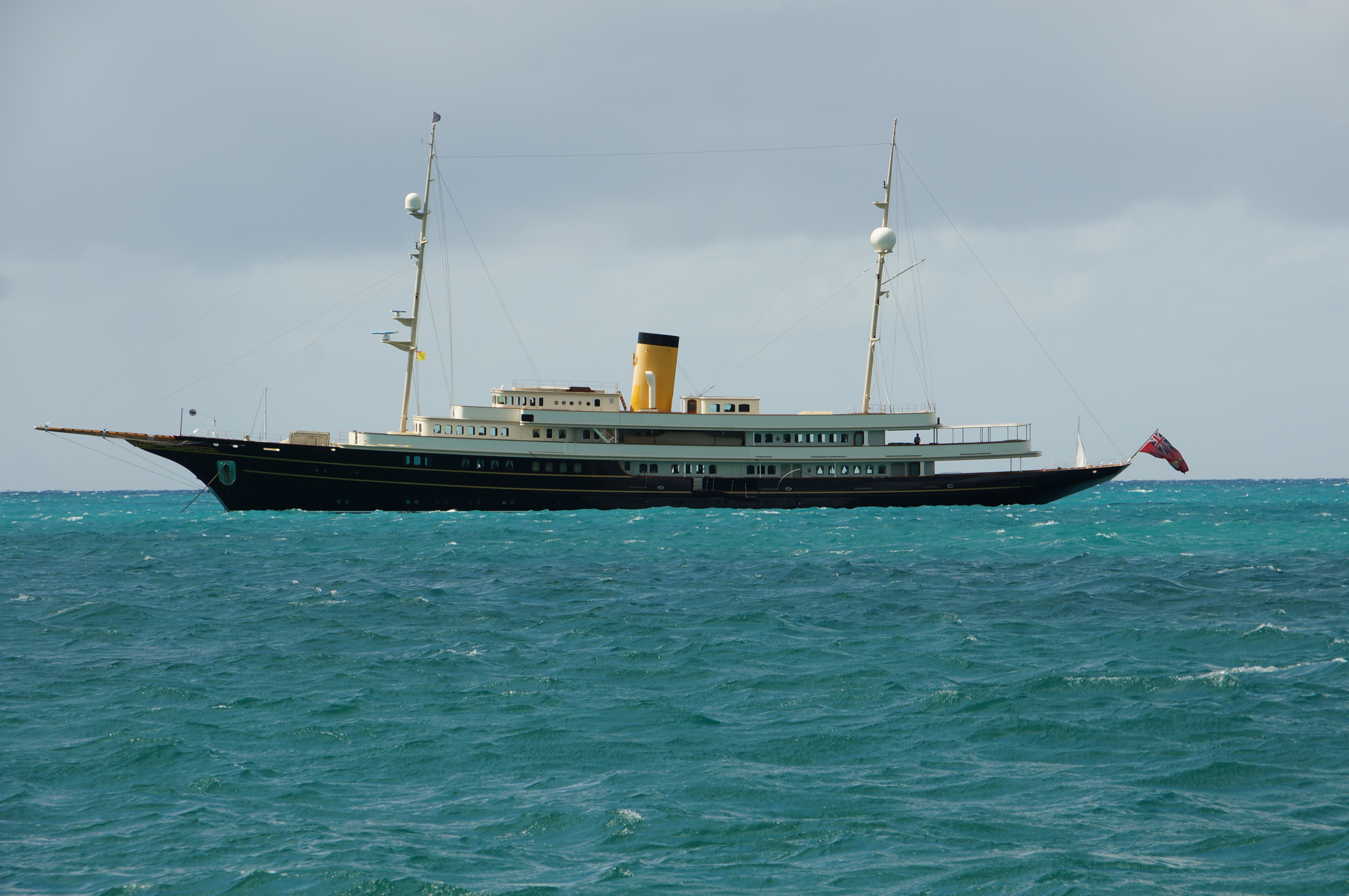
- Motor Yacht Nero, Simpson Bay, St. Maarten

History

- Name: Nero
- Port of registry: George Town, Cayman Islands
- Builder: Corsair Yachts and Yantai Raffles Shipyard
- Launched: 2008
- Identification: IMO number: 1008449; MMSI number: 319672000; International callsign: ZCOX

General characteristics
- Type: Super yacht
- Tonnage: 1,413 GT
- Displacement: 1,775 tonnes
- Length: 90.1 m (296 ft)
- Beam: 12.0 m (39.4 ft)
- Draught: 4.87 m (16.0 ft)
- Installed power: 2 × 1,740 kW (2,333 shp)
- Speed: 30 km/h (16 kn)
- Range: 9,600 km (5,200 nmi) at 22 km/h (12 kn)
- Crew: 20 crew; 12 guests

Nero is a luxury superyacht, measuring 90.1 metres (296 ft) in length. She was commissioned by Neil Taylor and built in 2007 by Corsair Yachts at Yantai Raffles Shipyard in China.

She is part of the Burgess Charter Fleet.

== History ==
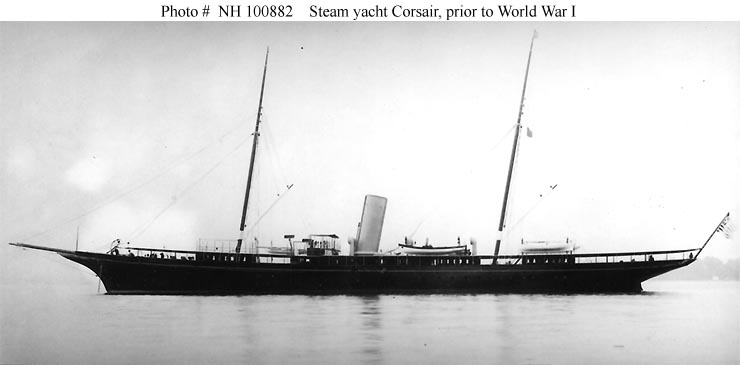
Corsair II (built 1899 for J.P. Morgan)

Nero was commissioned and designed by London-born entrepreneur Neil Taylor. Nero's design is based on a line of Corsair yachts built by J.P. Morgan. Taylor intended to restore a yacht from J.P. Morgan's era but was unable to find one that met his requirements, so he planned to build a modern replica. Its architecture was designed by IMT Marine Consultants. It was built by Corsair Yachts in China at Yantai Raffles Shipyard. The ship launched in 2008.

In 2009, Nero won Best Motor Yacht over 75 metres (246 ft) at the 2009 ShowBoats International Design Awards. Also in 2009, the yacht was listed for sale with Merle Wood & Associates and Burgess at €75 million (US$98 million). In April 2011, the price was reduced to €67.5 million (US$88.2 million), and in 2012 the price was reduced again to €59.9 million (US$78.3 million).

In 2014, Nero was sold to Denis O'Brien and in 2016 it underwent a renovation.

== Features ==
Nero features a master duplex suite with ensuite bath and shower rooms, a private sundeck and swimming pool. It also includes a 'VIP' cabin, four other cabins, a 9.4m cabin cruiser, a 7.9m tender and a 5.5m side boarding platform.

== See also ==
- List of motor yachts by length
