= Loaloat Al Behar =

Ex-yacht owned by Sultan Qaboos

History
- Name: Loaloat Al Behar
- Owner: Sultan Qaboos
- Builder: Picchiotti, Italy
- Yard number: Y00491
- Launched: 6 June 1981
- Identification: IMO number: 7908433; MMSI number: 461000425; Callsign: A4LA
- Status: Currently in service

General characteristics
- Class & type: yacht
- Length: 103.85 meters (340.72 ft)
- Beam: 16.20 meters (53.15 ft)
- Draft: 5.00 meters (16.40 ft)
- Speed: 18.0 knots (maximum); 17.2 knots (cruising)

Loaloat Al Behar (Arabic: لؤلؤة البحار, lit. 'The Pearl of the Seas') is the name of the ex-yacht Al Said owned by Sultan Qaboos of the Sultanate of Oman. The yacht is large and spacious, being built in 1982 by Picchiotti of Italy. In 2007, when His Majesty, Sultan Qaboos took possession of his new yacht, this one was renamed Loaloat Al Behar. The yacht was given as a gift to Oman’s Ministry of Tourism. She has just been refitted and repainted white.

== Design ==
The yacht Loaloat Al Behar was finished in 1982 by world famous shipbuilders Picchiotti of Italy. The yacht is large and has length of 103.85 meters (or 340.72 ft) and a beam of 16.20 meters (or 53.15 ft). The draft of the yacht is 5.00 meters (or 16.40 ft). The main engines are two 4800 HP Detroit TA 420-6, which together with twin-screw propellers give enough power for the Loaloat Al Behar to reach a maximum speed of 18.0 knots.
