= Bravo Eugenia (yacht) =

Superyacht

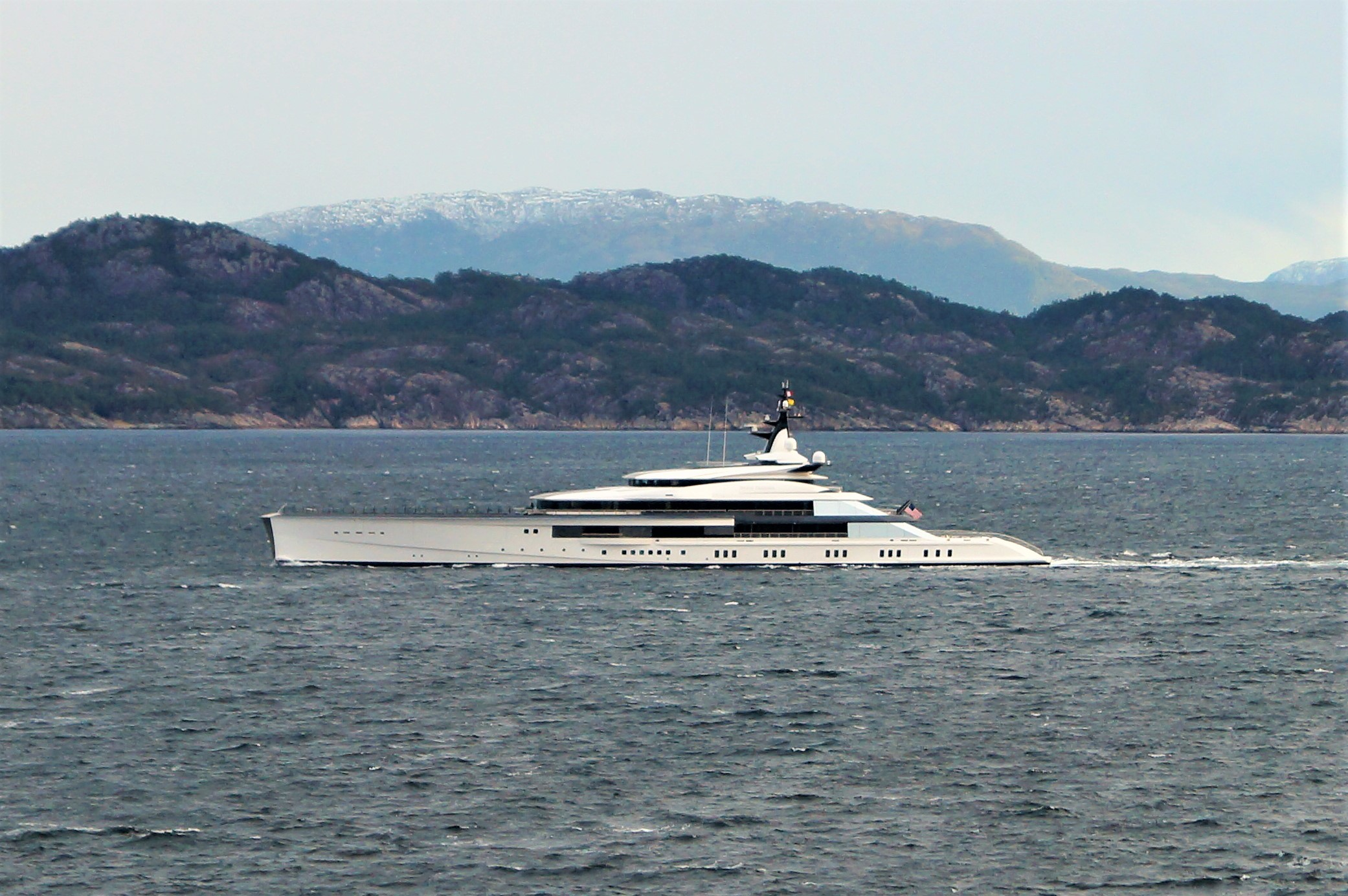
- Bravo Eugenia photographed at Korsfjorden, Norway in 2018

History

Cayman Islands
- Name: Bravo Eugenia
- Owner: Jerry Jones
- Builder: Oceanco
- Yard number: Y718
- Launched: 2017-02-15
- Completed: 2018
- Notes: IMO number: 1012921; MMSI number: 319156800; Call sign: ZGIL4

General characteristics
- Type: Superyacht
- Tonnage: 3,418 GT
- Length: 109.0 m (357 ft 7 in)
- Beam: 16.3 m (53 ft 6 in)
- Propulsion: 2 × MTU - 20V 4000 M73L; 2 × 4.828 hp (3.600 kW)
- Speed: 17.5 knots (32 km/h; 20 mph) (maximum)
- Capacity: 14 passengers
- Crew: Up to 30
- Notes: Built at Oceanco's Zwijndrecht facility and outfitted at their facility in Alblasserdam

Bravo Eugenia is a superyacht built by Oceanco in 2018. The ship's exterior was designed by Nuvolari Lenard and its interior was designed by Reymond Langton Design. The yacht has a steel hull and an aluminium superstructure.

During construction, the vessel was referred to as 'Project Bravo and was also sometimes referred to by her yard number, Y718. The yacht had its technical launch on February 14, 2017, at Zwijndrecht. It was moved to Oceanco's other shipyard at Alblasserdam in the subsequent hours for outfitting. The yacht was delivered on December 20, 2018. Bravo Eugenia is owned by Jerry Jones who named it in honor of his wife, Gene. In 2020, Jones made his NFL draft on board the vessel.

== Specifications ==
- Length Overall: 109.0 M
- Beam Overall: 16.3 M
- Classification: Lloyd's Register
- Maximum speed: 17.5 knots (32 km/h)
- Material: Steel hull & Aluminium superstructure
- Engine type: 2 X MTU 2,920HP diesel engines with heat and energy recovery system and integrated battery system.
- Naval architect: Lateral Naval Architects
- Exterior designer: Nuvolari Lenard
- Interior designer: Reymond Langton Design

Amenities:

- Two helicopter pads.
- Spa.
- Steam Room.
- Sauna.
- Gymnasium.
- Beach Club.
- Plunge Pool.

== Gallery ==
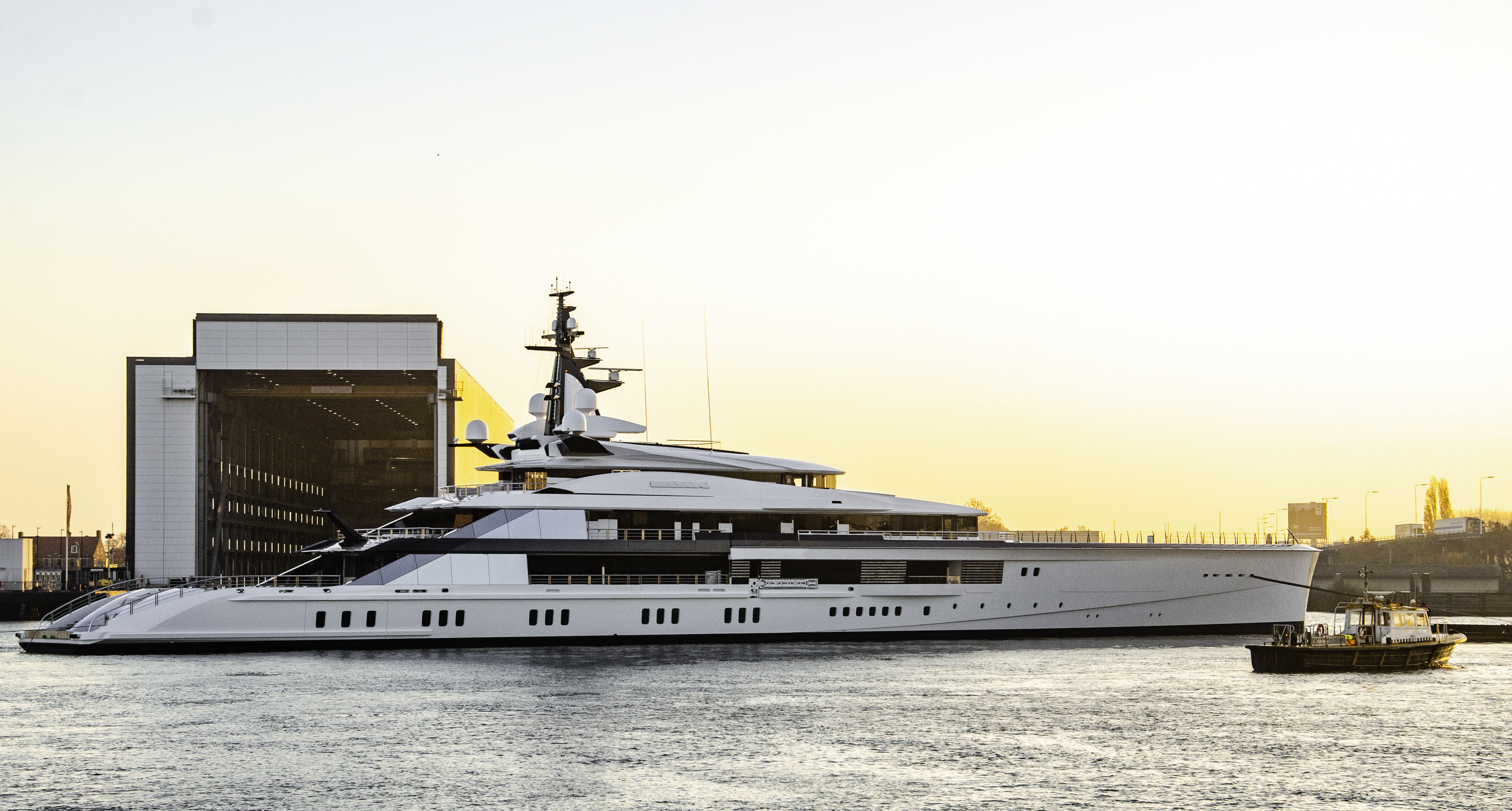
Bravo Eugenia leaving the Oceanco yard for sea trials

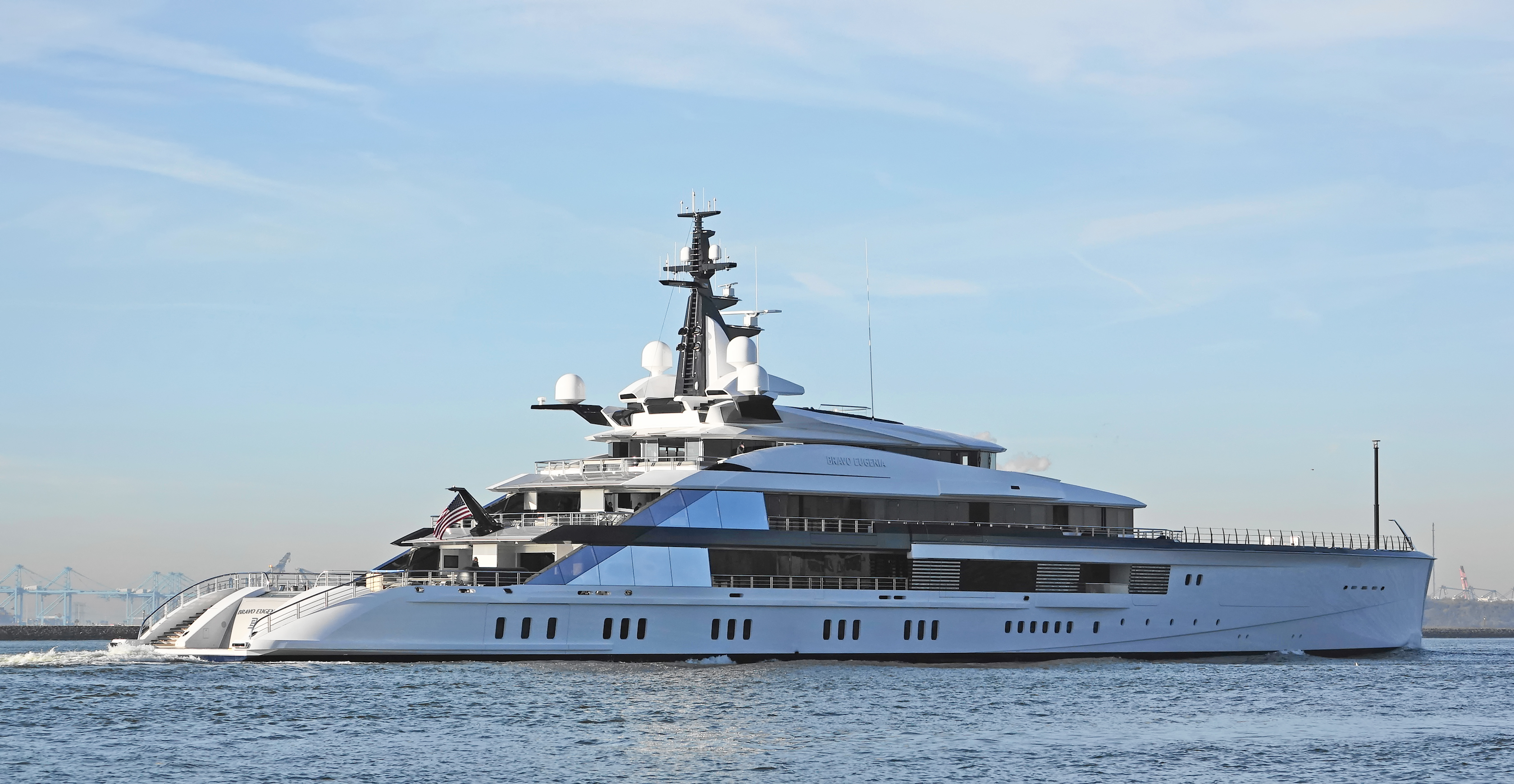
Seen at Hoek van Holland in 2019

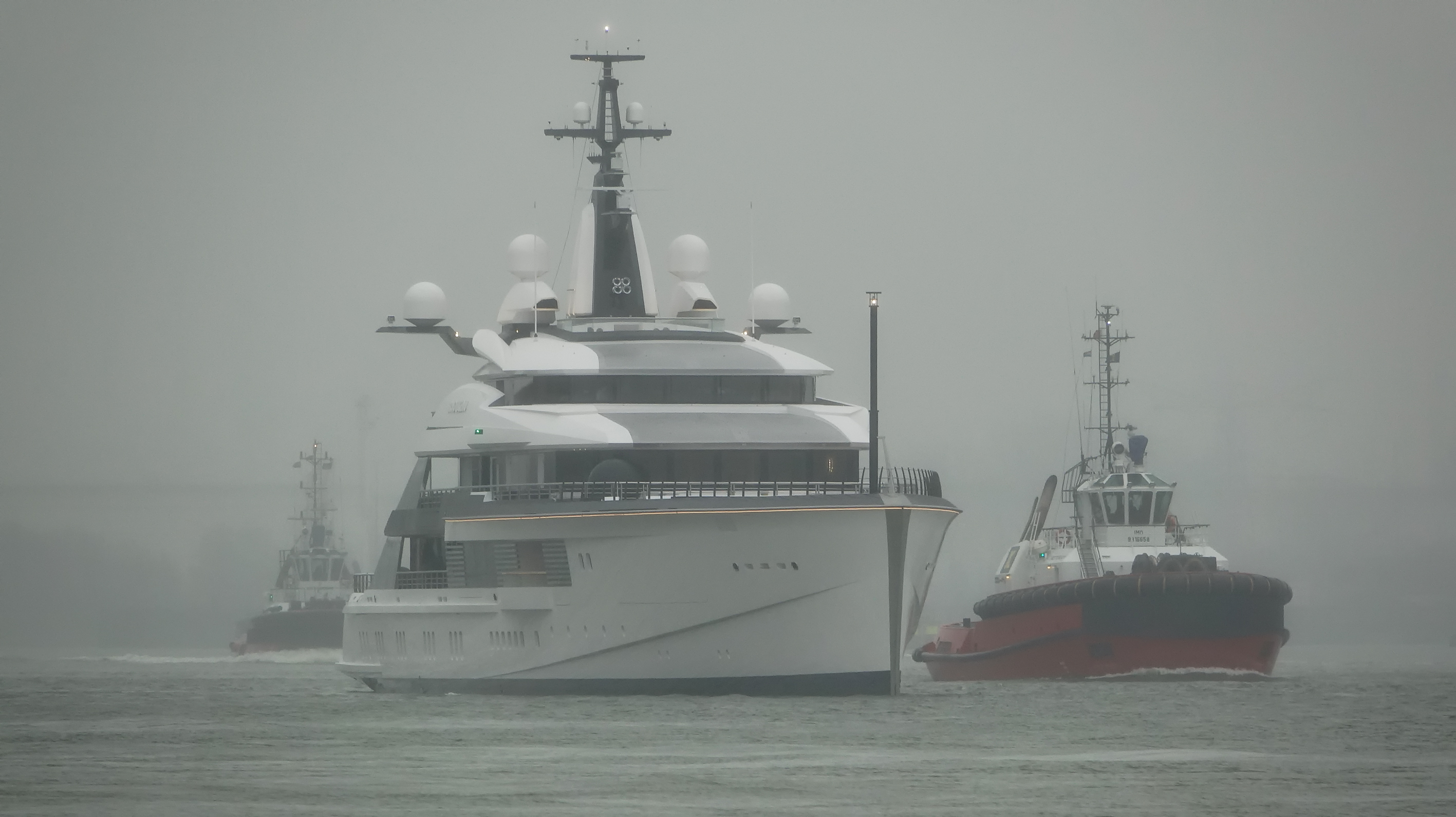
Under tow by the tug SMIT Hudson
