= Boardwalk (yacht) =

2026 superyacht by Lürssen

History

Cayman Islands
- Name: Boardwalk
- Owner: Tilman Fertitta
- Builder: Lürssen
- Yard number: 13797
- Laid down: 2023
- Launched: December 2025
- Completed: May 14, 2026
- Identification: IMO number: 9965605; MMSI number: 319343600; Callsign:ZGVS33

General characteristics
- Class & type: Motor yacht
- Tonnage: 5,602 GT
- Length: 117 m (383 ft 10 in)
- Beam: 18.55 m (60 ft 10 in)
- Installed power: 2 × MAN V12 diesel engines, 2,433 kW (3,263 hp) each; 4,866 kW (6,525 hp) total
- Propulsion: Twin screw propellers
- Capacity: 11 guest staterooms
- Crew: 48
- Notes: Two helipads

Boardwalk is a 117-metre (383 ft 10 in) superyacht built by the German shipyard Lürssen in Bremen and delivered in May 2026. The yacht is owned by American businessman and United States ambassador to Italy Tilman Fertitta. Fertitta was closely involved in the development and design of the vessel. The yacht has been described as a private resort, a mobile residence, and as a "global entertainment flagship". Its price has been estimated to be $450-500 million. Boardwalk is registered in the Cayman Islands.

== Design and construction ==
Boardwalk was built as Lürssen Project 13797. Construction was commissioned in 2022, with the yacht launched in December 2025 and delivered in May 2026. The yacht is 117 m (383 ft 10 in) long. Lürssen lists a beam of 18.55 metres (60 ft 10 in) and a 5,602 gross tonnage (GT). The exterior design is by Frank Woll. The interior spaces were developed by Woll together with the late Amy Halffman, Suzanne Glover, and Teresa Francis.

The yacht has 11 guest staterooms, including a forward VIP suite. Exterior pools are incorporated into the Tesumo deck. A retractable section of deck opens to reveal an exterior stairway, a feature described by Lürssen as a first for the shipyard. Other features include a glass-walled catwalk through the engine room, a cinema, spa and gym, a putting green and two helipads. A substantial tender garage accommodates three custom 12-metre Hodgdon tenders, an amphibious tender, off-road and other land vehicles. At night, about 3,000 points of light illuminate the exterior.

== Propulsion ==
Boardwalk is powered by twin diesel engines that produce 2,433 kW (3,263 hp) each; 4,866 kW (6,525 hp) total. Lürssen indicates that the yacht can reach a speed of 18 knots (33 km/h; 21 mph).

== Name ==
The yacht continues Fertitta's use of the name Boardwalk for a succession of his yachts. His 2021 Boardwalk is now Boardwalk V.

- Boardwalk V, a 76.5 m (251 ft 0 in) Feadship yacht in 2021.
- Night Howl, a 50 m (164 ft 1 in) Westport 164 in 2010,
- Relentless, a 39.6 m (129 ft 11 in) Westport 130 in 2005,
- Tanzanite, a 44.2 m (145 ft 0 in) Westport in 2004,
- Amico, a 34.1 m (111 ft 11 in) Westport 112 in 2002.

== History ==
In July 2026, on a diplomatic coastal tour of Italy, Fertitta brought Boardwalk to Venice inciting local protests against "arrogance" and American international politics.

== See also ==
- List of motor yachts by length
- List of yachts built by Lürssen
- Luxury yacht
