= Yim Leak =

Cambodian businessman

Yim Leak is a Cambodian businessman.

== Career ==
Between December 2025 and April 2026, Thailand's Anti-Money Laundering Office (AMLO) issued orders temporarily seizing assets linked to Yim. In September 2026, a Thai government spokesman said 20.4 billion baht in assets linked to a financial network tied to Yim and South African financier Benjamin Mauerberger had been seized or frozen.

Yim was named in a draft version of the Dismantle Foreign Scam Syndicates Act introduced in the US House of Representatives on 18 September 2025, but removed from the version approved by the House Foreign Affairs Committee on 3 December 2025.

Yim has denied the allegations. In December 2025, his lawyers said a police press release about raids on his Bangkok residence was factually incorrect, that he had never held Thai nationality, and that he had left Thailand in June 2025 through proper immigration channels, months before the raids. They also said a 2024 AMLO review of the same assets had found no link to criminal activity and lifted the seizure. In April 2026, the government said criminal proceedings were still at the evidence-gathering stage. In June 2026, he filed an application in US federal court seeking evidence to challenge the allegations; his lawyer said he had never been convicted of a crime.

== Personal life ==
Yim is the son of Cambodian People's Party Vice-Chair and Deputy Prime Minister Yim Chhaily.
