= Emir (yacht) =

Luxury charter yacht

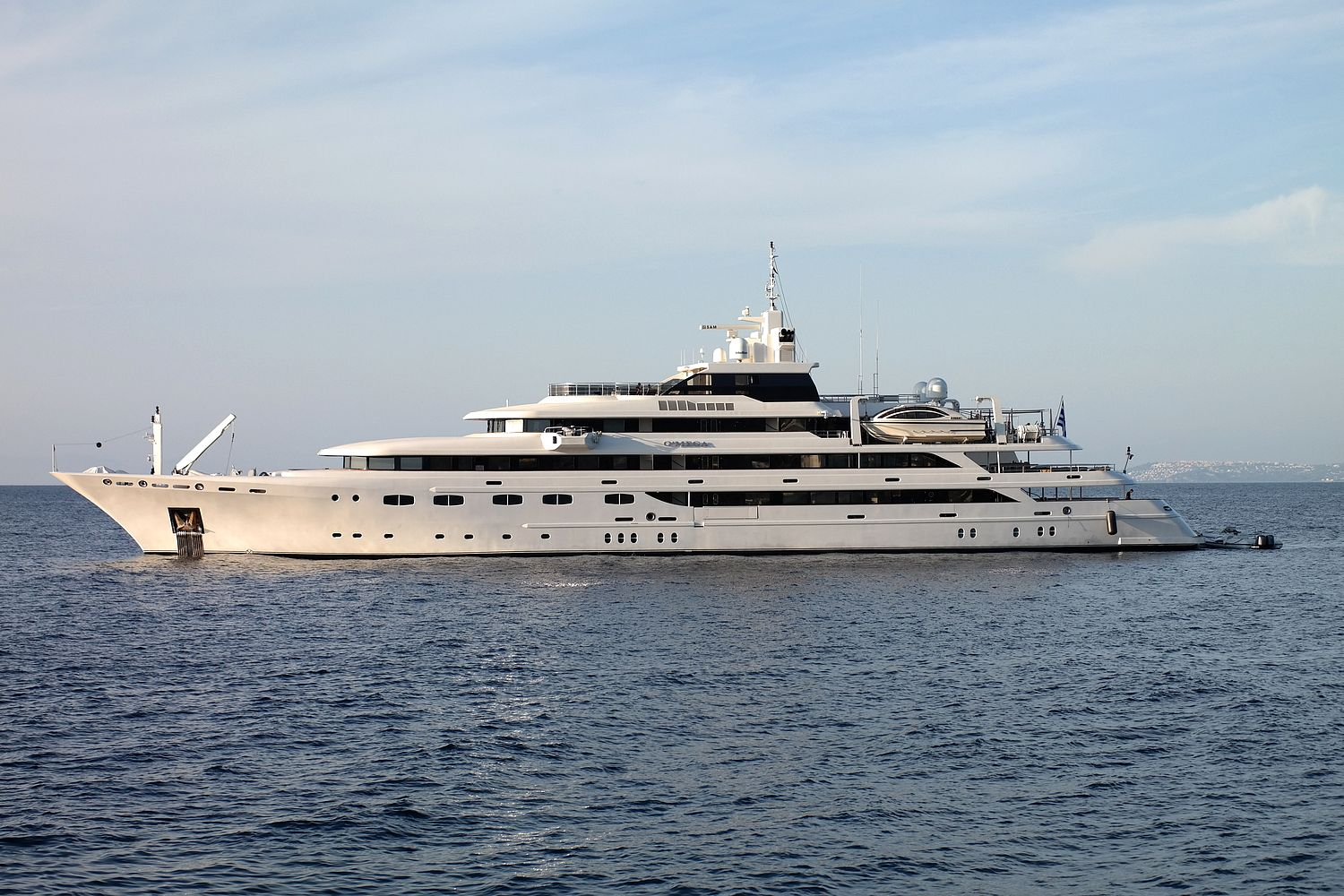
- Emir as O'Mega underway

History
- Name: O'Mega
- Builder: Mitsubishi Heavy Industries
- Launched: 24 June 1985
- Renamed: Emir
- Identification: IMO number: 8503151; MMSI number: 240183000; Callsign: SVJN

General characteristics
- Class & type: Superyacht
- Length: 82.5 m (271 ft)
- Beam: 11.60 m (38.1 ft)
- Draft: 4.40 m (14.4 ft)
- Propulsion: 2 × Yanmar engines; 2 × 2,000 hp
- Speed: 14.5 knots (27 km/h) (maximum); 12.5 knots (23 km/h) (cruising)
- Capacity: 28 passengers
- Crew: 28 crew members

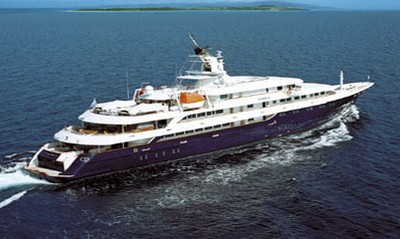
ex-O'Mega before her refit, with blue hull

Emir (ex-O'Mega) is a yacht built in 1985 as a passenger vessel by the shipyard of Mitsubishi Heavy Industries. In 2002 she was sold and converted into a superyacht and renamed O'Mega. One year later the steel motor yacht was completed and handed over to the owner. She was number 29 in the Power & Motor Yacht magazine's list of the World's 100 Largest Yachts 2008. In 2011 she underwent a refit and her hull colour was changed from black to white.

== Crew ==
Her permanent crew consists of the captain and 28 crew members.

== Design ==
The vessel has an overall length of 82.5m (270.66ft) and her beam is 11.60m (38.05 ft). She can accommodate up to 28 guests and 28 crew members.

Her main engines are two Yanmar diesel engines which can each generate 2,000 bhp giving her a maximum speed of 14.5 knots (26.9 km/h; 16.7 mph) and a cruising speed of 12.5 knots (23.2 km/h; 14.4 mph).

== See also ==
- List of motor yachts by length
