= Kutayba Alghanim =

Kuwaiti billionaire

- Born: Kutayba Yusuf Ahmed Alghanim; January 7, 1944 (age 82); Kuwait
- Education: University of California, Berkeley (Bachelor of Arts/Science)
- Occupation: Businessperson
- Organization: Alghanim Industries
- Website: https://www.kutaybaalghanim.com/

Kutayba Yusuf Ahmed Alghanim (born January 7, 1944) is a Kuwaiti billionaire businessperson. He is the chairman of Alghanim Industries.

== Early life and education ==
Alghanim attended the University of California, Berkeley and completed his Bachelor of Arts/Science in 1970.

== Career ==
Alghanim started his career when he returned from California after completing his studies. In 1970, Kutayba returned to Kuwait and ventured into the furniture retail industry. He initiated an entrepreneurial venture by personally financing a store called "Al-Dar." Alghanim was appointed as a managing director for Alghanim Industries. He currently serves as a chairman at Alghanim Industries.

== Honours ==
- Forbes World Richest People List: 2011-2013
