= Viktor Rashnikov =

Russian billionaire businessman (born 1948)

- Виктор Рашников
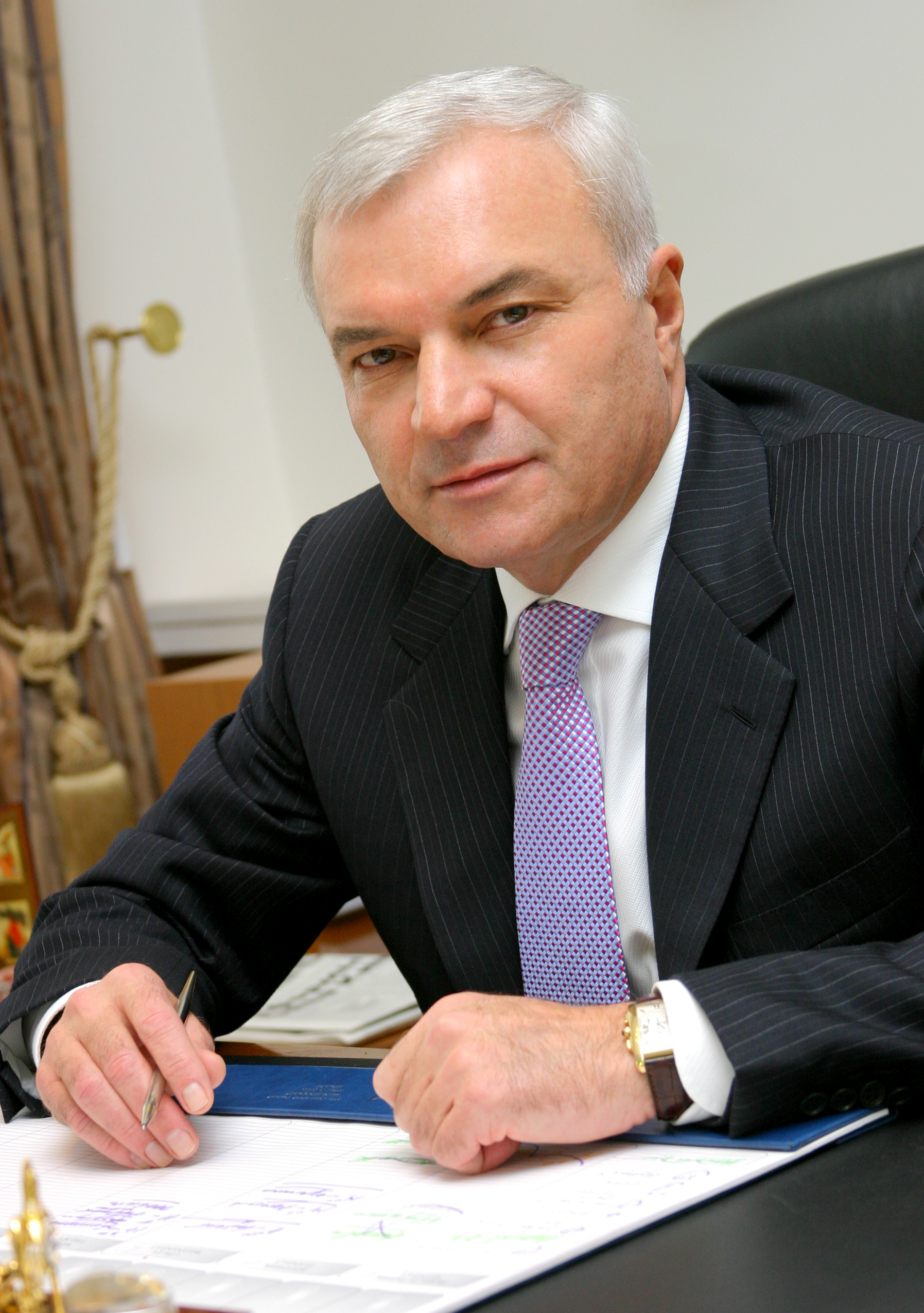
- Rashnikov in 2005
- Born: October 13, 1948 (age 77); Magnitogorsk, USSR (now Russia)
- Education: Magnitogorsk Institute of Mining and Metallurgy
- Occupations: Chairman, Magnitogorsk Iron and Steel Works
- Spouse: married
- Children: 2
- Awards: Order "For Merit to the Fatherland" (2nd class); Order "For Merit to the Fatherland" (3rd class); Order "For Merit to the Fatherland" (4th class); Order of Honour

Viktor Filippovich Rashnikov (born October 13, 1948) is a Russian engineer and a billionaire businessman. An oligarch, he made his wealth (estimated at $9.1 billion in February 2019) in the iron and steel industry, being the majority owner of Magnitogorsk Iron & Steel Works (MMK), one of the world's leading steel producers.

Following Russia's invasion of Ukraine, Rashnikov and MMK were placed on sanctions lists by the USA, UK and EU. In September 2022, Hungary sought to have Rashnikov dropped from the EU's list.

== Education ==
In 1974, Rashnikov earned a bachelor's degree in metal forming process at the Magnitogorsk Institute of Mining and Metallurgy. He later gained another degree in Organization of Production Administration, graduating from that program in 1994.

Rashnikov received his doctorate in Technical Sciences in 1998. In addition to writing many research papers and scientific reports, he has implemented numerous engineering solutions.

In 2002 he was elected to the position of Honored Professor at the Moscow Institute of Steel and Alloys. Additionally, he holds a role at the Russian Academy of Quality Problems as an Academician.

== Career ==
Rashnikov first began his career with the Magnitogorsk Iron & Steel Works (MMK) in the company's repair shop as a fitter in 1967. Since then, up through 1991, Rashnikov advanced through a number of management positions at MMK, including that of Head of Production and Products Supply. In 1991, he was made Chief Engineer and First Deputy General Director for the firm. In 1997, Viktor Rashnikov succeeded in rising to the role of General Director at MMK, before finally becoming in 2005 its chairman of the board.

== Leadership at MMK ==
Having worked his way up through various positions at MMK, Viktor Rashnikov was able in the 90's to attain near complete control of the company through the purchase of shares on the market (87.26% as of May 2017).

The results of Rashnikov's leadership at MMK are described by some as "impressive",

"By 2007, 10 years after Mr. Rashnikov became director, MMK doubled steel production from 6m to 12m tonnes a year."

"Steel king with magnetic effect", Financial Times, 2008.

It was under Rashnikov's tenure as chairman of the board of directors in 2007 that MMK became a publicly traded company on the London Stock Exchange.

He implemented a full-scale investment program including modernization of five blast furnaces, construction of an oxygen unit, construction of electric arc furnace facilities, construction of thick-plate Mill 5000 and the cold-rolling Mill 2000 complex. In 2000–2016, total investments of the company amounted to $13 billion, including about $10 billion in MMK's development.

== Philanthropic activities ==
Viktor Rashnikov annually allocates about $25 million to the company's social and charitable pursuits, including:

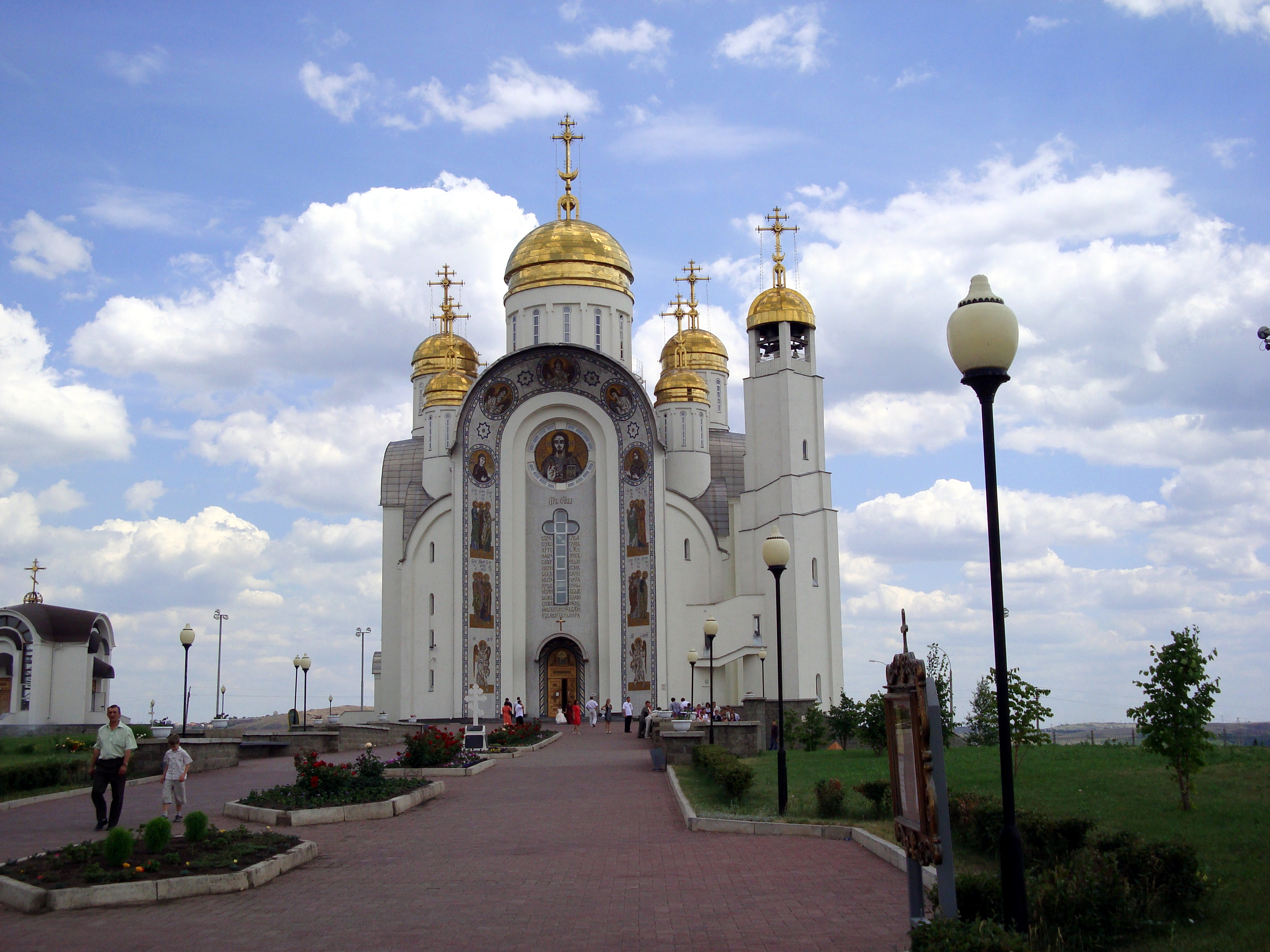
Viktor Rashnikov helped to fund the construction of the Holy Ascension Cathedral in Magnitogorsk

He also built sophisticated medical facilities and two ski resorts in the nearby Urals.

Due to MMK's environmental activities, total emissions had been reduced by 37.5% and the specific emissions by 47.4%. In 2011–2016, environmental spending of the company averaged 3.5-4 billion rubles per year. The company recently adopted a long-term environmental program through 2025, with funding of more than $600 million.

Rashnikov's contribution to social development of Magnitogorsk is recognized by the Russian government. December 3, 2009

== Metallurg Magnitogorsk ==
Rashnikov is the owner and the president of Metallurg Magnitogorsk ice hockey team. Since he took over in 1993, the team worked up a reputation as one of the top Russian teams of the new era.

With the support of Rashnikov and MMK, in 2006 on the bank of the Ural River a modern ice palace with a capacity of more than 7,500 people was built (the investments amounted to $50 million). The Arena Metallurg stadium is the base of the Metallurg ice hockey club, as well as the junior ice hockey team Stalnye Lisy (Steel Foxes).

== Personal life ==
Rashnikov was born to a Russian family. He is a Russian Orthodox Christian. He has two daughters. He owns a Gulfstream G650 registered VP-BOT (operated by Jet Aviation Business Jets) and previously owned a Bombardier Global 5000 registered VP-BJN.
