= Legend (yacht) =

Legend ex Kay
Development
- Designer: Olin Stephens of Sparkman & Stephens
- Location: USA
- Year: 1953
- Builders: Abeking & Rasmussen Boat Yard, Lemwerder, Germany

Boat
- Displacement: 17.35 tons
- Draft: 7.5 ft (2.3 m)

Hull
- LOA: 52.5 ft (16.0 m)
- LWL: 36 ft (11 m)
- Beam: 12 ft 1 in (3.68 m)

Hull appendages
- Ballast: 7.6 tons Lead

Rig
- Rig type: Custom Yawl

Sails
- Mainsail area: 1,325 sq ft (123.1 m^{2})

Legend is a yacht designed in 1953 by Olin Stephens of Sparkman & Stephens and built 1953–54 by Abeking and Rasmussen Boat Yard in Lemwerder, Germany. Legend, originally christened as Kay, began her race history starting immediately after delivery in 1954 from Abeking & Rasmussen to her first owner Sven Frisell in Sweden. She entered and won the Royal Ocean Racing Club’s Cowes to Coruna in Class II, first on corrected time by a margin of fifteen hours. In the S&S manner, their design no. 1110 shows a 52.5-foot yawl. She is a double-planked design with Honduran mahogany below the waterline on oak frames, a teak superstructure and bronze fastenings above, including a bronze mainsail horse, and a sail area of 1,325 sq ft. She would then cross the Atlantic to prepare for the Newport Bermuda Race, entering in 1956 and 1958, winning in her class under ownership of sailors Morss, Humphries and Stills as Legend in 1958. Small configurational changes followed, including removal of the traveler/block configuration on the cabin top and reproduction of her lost lapstrake tender (Gannon & Benjamin Boat Yard, Martha's Vineyard). Legend continued to race on the East Coast and Caribbean through the 1970s and 1980s with numerous gold medals (see Major Races, below), receiving a significant restoration in the aughts. The yawl features Dorade boxes with seven prominent bronze dorades, i.e., a novel S&S waterproofed cowl ventilator or airflow design feature dating from its eponymously named sister launched in 1930, Dorade. Olin Stephens attributed conception of this ventilator to his brother Rod. This ventilator configuration became a standard fitting on small sailing craft including Legend. A few noteworthy S&S designs, sister yawls of Legend described by OS as prewar victors, include Dorade (1929), Stormy Weather (1934), Zeearend (1936), Baruna (1937) and Bolero (1949).

== Major races and regattas of Legend, selected history ==
- 1954: Royal Ocean Racing Club Cowes to Coruna: First, Class II
- 1957: Fastnet Race: Second, on both elapsed and corrected time
- 1958: Newport Bermuda Race: First, Class A
- 1962: Monhegan Island Race: First
- 1979, 1980 & 1982: St. Barth's Regatta: First, Cruising Class; and First, Single Handed (1980)
- 1981: St. Maartens Regatta: First, Racing Class
- 1982 & 1986: St. Maartens Regatta: First, Overall and Cruising Class
- 1983: Newport Museum of Yachting Classic: First, and Sparkman & Stevens Trophy
- 1984: Opera House Regatta: First, Class B
- 1985: Opera House Regatta: First; St. Maartens Regatta: First
- 1991: Antigua Classic Regatta: First
- 2014 & 2015: Master Mariners Regatta & Baruna Cup: First, and 2014 Stone Trophy

== Restoration ==
Legend has had three restorations, including extensive restoration under prior ownership of Tony Remiolates (2003–07), and most recently a significant restoration including replanking and a newly commissioned spruce mizzen during 2024–26 under ownership of Emanuel Voyiaziakis.

== See also ==
- Dorade box, a ventilator arrangement first used on Dorade, prominent on subsequent S&S designs, including Legend.
