= Elefsis Shipyards =

Greek shipbuilding company

- Company type: subsidiary
- Industry: shipbuilding
- Founded: 1968
- Headquarters: Athens, Attica, Greece
- Key people: Stratis Andreadis (founder)
- Products: Ships, military ships, yachts

Elefsis Shipyards is a Greek shipbuilding company, also involved in other industrial constructions. Founded in 1968, it has constructed many types of ships, including the largest bulk carriers built in Greece, as well as military ships. The latter include the Jason-class tank landing ships (LST) developed by Elefsis Shipyards (first launched in 1987), a series of Fast Attack Crafts, and the largest ship of the Greek Navy, support ship Promitheus (A-374), on Italian designs.

Its latest constructions include an advanced high-speed ferry type, of which two have been so far delivered (in 2005 and 2007). Other company divisions and activities include ship repair and conversions, and industrial constructions. The latter has undertaken specialized metal and mechanical structures for the Greek industry, port cranes, huge mining equipment, as well as rolling stock, especially freight rail wagons. The company, like others in its field, has been hard hit by the crisis in the European shipbuilding sector and the intense competition from Southeast Asian companies. After its 1997 acquisition by Neorion shipyards things temporarily improved, but problems persist and there are talks for a necessary further consolidation of the Greek shipbuilding industry.

== References and external links ==
- Company website
- L.S. Skartsis, "Modern Greece's Machines: A Comprehensive Guide to Greek Vehicle & Machine Manufacturers (1700 to Present)" (2026) ISBN 978-618-00-6734-7 (open access eBook)
- Jason class tank landing ships
- "Delta Berenike" self propelled special purpose vessel for the deployment of the components of the Cubic kilometer Neutrino Telescope, built by Elefsis Shipyards
