= Somnio (yacht) =

Private super yacht

History
- Name: Somnio
- Builder: VARD
- Cost: US$600 million
- Status: Under construction

General characteristics
- Class & type: Super yacht
- Type: Motor yacht
- Tonnage: 33,500 GT
- Length: 222 m (728 ft)

Somnio (Latin: I dream) is a private super yacht being built by Norwegian shipyard VARD. The hull, and the first phase of outfitting, will be performed at Vard Tulcea in Romania. It is considered the world's first "yacht liner" because it contains 39 customizable apartments. The apartments reportedly cost at least $11.2 million each.

In 2025, Somnio’s founder Carl Le Souef, alongside Somnio Superyachts Pty Ltd, was successfully sued by English yacht design firm Winch Design Ltd for unpaid design invoices totalling in excess of £700,000.

Membership is by referral or invitation, with members' identities remaining undisclosed.

Winch Design of the United Kingdom and Tillberg Design of Sweden are the architects.

It was expected to launch in mid-2024. Somnio also has advanced research equipment for scientists. It will be the second residential superyacht at sea and in size will be slightly larger than The World, the only residential superyacht currently in existence.
