= Royal Denship =

Royal Denship was a Danish multi-facility conglomerate ship and yacht builder. The company has created some of the world's largest super yachts.

Royal Denship constructed yachts across six ship yards, constructing motor, expedition and sailing yachts. Among Royal Denship's partners were Assens Shipyard, Danyard Aalborg Yachts, Fredericia Shipyard, Tuco Yacht Vaerft and Aarhus Shipyards.

On April 3, 2009, Royal Denship was declared bankrupt by the Bankruptcy Court in Aarhus. Following a period in administration, the brand was re-established in 2015 as part of the Dutch Hartman Marine Group, though the original company no longer exists. Several yachts have since been built and previously produced yachts have been re-fitted under the Royal Denship brand.

== Partners ==
- Aarhus Shipyard: was located in Aarhus. Declared bankrupt 5. October 2007. Royal Denship had 3 vessels under construction at the ship yard at the time, they were all finished by Danish subcontractors. The shipyard had two floating docks with the dimensions 90 x 16.5 x 5.2m with a lifting capacity of 1.750 tons and 70 x 13 x 4m with lifting capacity of 650 tons.
- Assens Shipyard: located on Funen, founded around 1850, the yard now covers 50,000 square meters. New build experience include trawlers, ferries, passenger ships, tugs, and special construction such as luxury yachts. The shipyard has two floating docks, one with the dimensions 80 x 40m with a lifting capacity of 1.200 tons and one with the dimensions 100 x 18.5m with lifting capacity of 2100 tons.
- Danyard Aalborg: was located in Aalborg. Liquidated 18. August 2009, soon after Royal Denship's bankruptcy. The company specialised in aluminium and composite based construction techniques. The company had previously constructed corvettes for the Royal Danish Navy, as well as commercial cruise ships, and ocean patrol vessels. Danyard Aalborg builds the Royal Denship 125 Classic, and the Royal Denship 135 Classic.
- FAYARD A/S: is located in Munkebo. It is the largest new build and repair yard in Denmark with a workforce of about 450. Founded in Fredericia by the Andersen family in 1916, it is still privately owned. The shipyard has 4 dry docks with the dimensions: Dock 1: 303 x 45 x 7 m, Dock 2: 280 x 44 x 7 m, Dock 3: 315/415 x 90 x 8 m, Dock 4: 145 x 30 x 8 m. The shipyard was at the time of Royal Denship called Fredericia Shipyard and located on the east coast of Jutland in Fredericia The yard included two floating docks of 20,000 tons and 12,000 tons respectively, a dry-dock of 108 x 22 x 5 m, and a slipway of 1,000 tons
- TUCO: located in Faaborg on the island of Funen, TUCO is a specialist composite material motor and sailing yacht builder

== Yachts built ==
- 258' Pegasus V (ex: Princess Mariana)
- 209' Cupani (ex: Turmoil)
- 206' Force Blue (ex: Big Roi)
- 153' Big Aron
- 146' Rose Pigre (ex: Odyssey, Amante)
- 143' Waterlily
- 143' Triple 8 (ex: Caneli)
- 137' Unforgettable
- 135' Ranger (J-Class sailing yacht)
- 125' Betty
- 120' Trideck
- 110' Vera 4 (ex: Fidel) (Sloop sailing yacht)
- 108' Aventura (Sloop sailing yacht)
- 2x85' Flybridge Yachts
- 7x82' Open Motor Yachts

== See also ==
- List of large sailing yachts
