= Timeline of the 1MDB scandal =

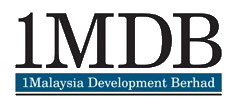

The 1Malaysia Development Berhad scandal is an ongoing political scandal in Malaysia, in which then-Prime Minister Najib Razak was accused of channeling over RM 2.67 billion (approximately US$700 million) into his personal bank accounts from 1Malaysia Development Berhad (1MDB), a government-run strategic development company. 1MDB was overseen by Najib as head of its advisory board. Following repeated calls for resignation by the public, Najib lost power in the 2018 Malaysian general election, and is currently on trial along with several key figures involved.

Najib has been convicted at the High Court, the Court of Appeal and the Federal Court over the RM42 million criminal breach of trust and money laundering in the SRC International case, and after numerous failed appeals, in 2022, Najib began serving his jail sentence with other cases continue to be on trial. His wife, Rosmah Mansor, also faces money-laundering and tax evasion charges that were acquitted in

== 2009 ==
- April 3: Najib is sworn in as the sixth Prime Minister of Malaysia.
- July: The Ministry Of Finance, under leadership of Najib, takes control of the Terengganu Investment Authority (TIA), proposes a change in name to 1Malaysia Development Berhad and expands the new entities remit from (Terengganu) state to national level development.
- September: The Companies Commission of Malaysia approves the transformation of Terengganu Investment Authority (TIA) to 1Malaysia Development Berhad (1MDB) on 25 September. 1MDB enters into a US$2.5 billion joint venture with private Saudi oil company PetroSaudi International.
- October 11: 1MDB's chairman, Bakke Salleh resigns his position for the second time in 6 months, due to management repeatedly not adhering to his directives.

== 2010 ==
- May: 1MDB signs deals with sovereign wealth funds in Qatar and Abu Dhabi, UAE. It also jointly undertakes the development of the old airport in Sungai Besi and the project is named Bandar Malaysia.

== 2012 ==
- March 8: 1MDB buys Tanjong Energy Holdings for RM8.5 billion from tycoon Ananda Krishnan.
- July: Najib launches the Tun Razak Exchange project.

== 2013 ==
- March: Tim Leissner, lead banker for bond sales at Goldman Sachs helps 1MDB raise a further $3bn in an additional bond sale, this time to cover "new strategic economic initiatives" between Malaysia and Abu Dhabi.
- May 5: Malaysia's 2013 General Elections is held. Najib's Barisan Nasional coalition wins the simple majority but the opposition coalition Pakatan Rakyat, led by Anwar Ibrahim wins the popular vote.
- December 25: The movie The Wolf of Wall Street, which stars Leonardo DiCaprio is released. The movie credits Jho Low, one of Najib's close aides.

== 2014 ==
- March: Malaysian newspaper The Edge reports that 1MDB is reportedly over $10 billion in debt.

== 2015 ==
- January: Around 227,000 leaked documents related to the fraud are handed to the Wall Street Journal and activist blogger Clare Rewcastle-Brown. The documents were reportedly leaked by Swiss national Xavier Justo, a former PetroSaudi International employee.
- May 29: 1MDB gets a US$1 billion payment from Abu Dhabi's International Petroleum Investment Company, which will be used to repay a US$975 million loan to a syndicate of international bank lenders.
- June 3: Malaysia's central bank launches an inquiry into 1MDB's workings.
- July 2: The Wall Street Journal releases a report alleging US$700 million (RM 2.6 billion) of deposits suspected to have originated with 1MDB have flowed into Najib Razak's personal bank accounts.
- July 4: Najib denies allegations that stolen money was found in his bank accounts, saying "If I wanted to steal, surely I won’t steal the money and bring it into an account in Malaysia."
- July 7: A special task force is formed to probe allegations that millions of dollars had been channeled into Najib Razak's bank accounts announces a freeze order for six accounts linked to the case.
- July 8: Police raid the 1MDB office, seizing documents.
- July 9: The Attorney-General's Chambers says that the six accounts which were ordered to be frozen were not linked to Najib, as his accounts with AmBank Islamic had already been closed by then.
- July 20: Sarawak Report is blocked by the Malaysian government.
- July 28: Following criticism, Najib performs a cabinet reshuffle. Deputy Prime Minister Muhyiddin Yassin and Rural and Regional Development Minister Shafie Apdal were dropped from their positions and were replaced by Ahmad Zahid Hamidi and Ismail Sabri Yaakob respectively, while Attorney General Abdul Ghani Patail was also sacked and replaced by Mohamed Apandi Ali.
- August 3: The MACC announces the task force has completed its investigation. It reveals the $700 million that allegedly went into Najib's accounts were from donations and had nothing to do with 1MDB.
- August 4: An arrest warrant is issued for Rewcastle-Brown.
- August 17: Thai authorities sentence Xavier Justo to a three-year prison term after he pleaded guilty to stealing information from PetroSaudi International (PSI).
- August 29–30: The Bersih 4 rally was held, with thousands joining, including former prime minister Mahathir Mohamad and his wife Siti Hasmah. Mahathir, with other participants, urge Najib to resign.
- September onwards: Several countries, including Hong Kong, Australia, Singapore and Switzerland, begin investigating financial firms and banks Najib allegedly used to siphon funds.
- October 20: Thai police give Malaysian counterparts approval to question Xavier Justo.
- October 27: Najib has filed a defamation suit against former MCA president Ling Liong Sik over remarks on the prime minister's handling of the 1MDB scandal.
- November 25: 1MDB CEO Shahrol Halmi is questioned by Malaysia's Public Accounts Committee (PAC). He is later called back in on November 30 for further questioning.
- December 1: PAC questions 1MDB president Arul Kanda Kandasamy.
- December 5: Najib gives a statement to the Malaysian Anti Corruption Commission (MACC) on the issue of the almost US$700 million found in his personal bank accounts and on SRC international.
- December 31: MACC submits 1MDB investigation papers to the Attorney General Mohamed Apandi Ali.

== 2016 ==
- January 11: Prime Minister Najib Razak and former MCA president Ling Liong Sik attempted mediation to resolve a defamation suit linked to the RM2.6 billion donation issue.
- January 26: Attorney General Apandi clears Najib of any wrongdoing, saying in a statement that US$681 million transferred into Najib's account was a "personal donation from the Saudi royal family". "A sum of US$620 million was returned by the Prime Minister to Saudi royal family because it was not utilised," the statement adds. However, at the press conference, Apandi contradicted himself by presenting two flow-charts ostensibly showing the Saudi donations but that actually showed that the funds originated from Malaysian sources.
- January 29: Swiss prosecutors request assistance from Malaysian authorities as they believe around US$4 billion was stolen from Malaysian state-owned companies. "A small portion" of the cash was transferred into Swiss accounts held by former Malaysian officials as well as current and former officials from the United Arab Emirates, the Swiss attorney general's office says in a statement.
- February 1: Singapore's Commercial Affairs Department (CAD) and the Monetary Authority of Singapore (MAS) issue a joint statement, saying a "large number" of bank accounts in relation to a probe into 1MDB have been seized.
- February 3: Menteri Besar of Kedah Mukhriz Mahathir resigns after losing majority support.
- February 7: Saudi Arabia's Foreign Minister Adel Al-Jubeir says he believes the funds that went into Najib's personal account were not a political donation from the Saudi government, but that they had been part of a business deal.
- February 19: 1MDB says in a statement that a Wall Street Journal report stating that it paid funds into the personal accounts of Najib is an "outright lie".
- February 29: Mahathir announces his departure from UMNO and also his withdrawal of support from Najib.
- March 4: The public and political protests had culminated in the Malaysian Citizens' Declaration by Mahathir, oppositions and NGO's to oust Najib.
- March 19: Prime Minister Najib Razak tells a political rally in Kuantan that people shouldn't "think I am a crook".
- March 23: Malaysia central bank governor Zeti Aktar Aziz says Bank Negara has initiated administrative punitive action against 1MDB after it failed to provide documents on its finances abroad.
- March 31: The Wall Street Journal publishes a report claiming that Najib spent lavishly on luxury goods overseas, using funds diverted from 1MDB.
- April 2: 1MDB denies reports that it provided funds to finance the movie The Wolf of Wall Street.
- April 5: Pandan MP Rafizi Ramli is arrested under the Official Secrets Act (OSA) for leaking the Auditor General's 1MDB report.
- April 7: 1MDB's board of directors offer to resign after a report released by the parliamentary Public Accounts Committee said it found the state investment fund's financing and performance "unsatisfactory".
- April 12: Swiss authorities expand its investigation into 1MDB to two former officials in charge of Abu Dhabi sovereign funds. Singapore's Attorney-General's Chambers receives a request for legal assistance from Switzerland with regard to 1MDB.
- April 13: 1MDB CEO Arul Kanda Kandasamy says the state investment fund could be a victim of fraud – after the Abu Dhabi sovereign fund, the International Petroleum Investment Company, denied receiving payment from 1MDB.
- April 19: Mahathir applies for a court order to freeze Najib's assets. 1MDB also says it is working to resolve the dispute with International Petroleum Investment Company.
- April 28: Malaysia's central bank fines 1MDB for "failure to fully comply with directions under the Financial Services Act".
- May 24: The Monetary Authority of Singapore announces it has ordered the closure of Switzerland's BSI Bank in Singapore over "serious breaches of anti-money laundering requirements, poor management oversight of the bank’s operations, and gross misconduct by some of the bank’s staff".
- May 31: Malaysia's Ministry of Finance announces the appointment of a new board of directors for 1MDB, succeeding the previous board.
- July 11: 1MDB agrees to resolve its dispute with International Petroleum Investment Company via the London Court of International Arbitration.
- July 21: United States Attorney General Loretta Lynch announces the filing of civil forfeiture complaints seeking the forfeiture and recovery of more than US$1 billion in assets associated with an alleged international conspiracy to launder funds misappropriated from 1MDB. The suit says $681m found its way into the personal account of ‘Malaysian Official 1’, later identified as Najib by both the US and a Malaysian minister.
- August 9: Xavier Justo receives a royal pardon and has his three-year sentence commuted by one-third.
- October 11: The Monetary Authority of Singapore orders the Singapore branch of Falcon Bank to cease operations for serious failures in anti-money laundering controls and improper conduct by senior management. MAS also imposes fines on DBS and UBS banks for breaches of its anti-money laundering requirements. This comes after "supervisory examinations by MAS into 1MDB-related fund flows" that took place through the three banks from March 2013 to May 2015, MAS said.
- December 2: MAS fines Standard Chartered Singapore and Coutts & Co for breaches of anti-money laundering requirements that occurred in the context of 1MDB-related fund flows.

== 2017 ==
- March 22: US authorities plan to file criminal charges against Jho Low, who is suspected to be at the center of the 1MDB scandal, the Wall Street Journal reports.
- April 24: 1MDB reaches a settlement deal with Abu Dhabi's International Petroleum Investment Company.
- May 30: The Monetary Authority of Singapore announces the completion of its two-year review of the banks involved in 1MDB-related transactions known-to-date. It says it has imposed financial penalties on Credit Suisse and United Overseas Bank, issued Prohibition Orders against three individuals and served notice of its intention to impose and same regulatory action on three others.
- June 15: US authorities move to seize another US$540 million in assets, allegedly stolen via 1MDB and used to fund extravagant spending.
- June 16: Filings by the US Justice Department in a civil lawsuit claim that nearly US$30 million of funds stolen from 1MDB was used to buy jewellery for the wife of "Malaysian Official 1".
- August 1: International Petroleum Investment Company gives 1MDB five days to make a US$600 million payment, which it failed to pay on July 31. 1MDB says it will make the payment within the month.
- August 2: Najib says 1MDB's failure to make the US$600 million payment to International Petroleum Investment Company was "a technical matter, and not a question of not being able to pay back".
- August 11: 1MDB says it has remitted US$350 million to International Petroleum Investment Company. This comes after Abu Dhabi extended the deadline for 1MDB to make its US$600 million debt repayment, provided at least US$310 million was paid by 12 Aug.
- August 30: 1MDB says it has remitted the second tranche due on 31 August 2017, in full.
- October 23: Malaysia asks Interpol to try to locate Jho Low for questioning over his suspected involvement in the 1MDB scandal.
- November 1: The Monetary Authority of Singapore issues prohibition orders against two individuals involved in breaches related to 1MDB.
- December 19: The Monetary Authority of Singapore issues more financial bans in its 1MDB investigation.
- December 27: International Petroleum Investment Company says 1MDB has paid the settlement amount in full.

== 2018 ==
- January 23: Prime Minister Najib Razak has once again conceded there were failings with regard to 1MDB but claimed that certain quarters who wanted to sabotage the nation's economy for political gain had amplified the issue.
- February 28: Indonesian authorities seize Jho Low's luxury yacht Equanimity, which was linked to the probe, which was moored at Benoa Bay, Bali.
- May 9: Opposition coalition Pakatan Harapan, led by Mahathir, wins in the country's general elections, defeating Najib and his Barisan Nasional coalition.
- May 12: Najib and his wife Rosmah Mansor are barred from leaving Malaysia. He later resigns as UMNO and Barisan Nasional chairman.
- May 16–17: Malaysian police seize luxury items from residences owned by Najib.
- May 22: Najib Razak is questioned by the MACC.
- May 22: Najib Razak withdrew his defamation suit filed against former MCA president Ling Liong Sik over the publication of an article which alleged Najib had abused funds belonging to 1MDB.
- May 24: Najib Razak is questioned by the MACC for the second time. The 1MDB task force convenes a meeting with the FBI and the United States' Department of Justice (DOJ) officials.
- June 5: Rosmah Mansor is questioned by the MACC.
- June 7: Malaysian police issue an arrest warrant for Jho Low and former director of SRC International Nik Faisal Ariff Kamil.
- June 19: In an interview with Reuters, Mahathir describes the 1MDB case against Najib Razak as "almost perfect". At the same time, while interviewed by the same news agency, Najib denied responsibility for the scandal, saying he "would have acted" if there was a misappropriation of funds.
- June 27: Police reveal the total amount of items seized at between RM 900 million and RM 1.1 billion (US$220 million and US$269 million).
- June 28: 1MDB CEO Arul Kanda is fired, two days before the end of his contract.
- July 3: Najib is arrested by the Malaysian Anti-Corruption Commission (MACC). He is charged with four counts of CBT and abuse of power over RM 42 million transferred into his private account from SRC International the following day.
- August 5: The Equanimity leaves Bali, where it was seized, to Batam island, before arriving at Port Klang two days later.
- August 8: Najib is charged with three additional counts of money laundering.
- September 20: 25 charges of graft and money laundering are filed against Najib Razak over 1MDB-linked transactions amounting to RM2.3 billion.
- October 25: Six criminal breach of trust (CBT) charges are filed against Najib Razak and former Treasury Secretary General Mohd Irwan Serigar Abdullah involving RM 6.6 billion worth of government funds.
- October 26: The Negeri Sembilan palace revokes titles conferred to Najib and Rosmah.
- October 29: The Equanimity is put up to auction, pending a US$1 million deposit.
- November 1: The DOJ announced that two former Goldman Sachs bankers, Tim Leissner and Roger Ng, and Jho Low, were indicted over funds misappropriated from 1MDB and paying bribes to various Malaysian and Abu Dhabi officials. Leissner pleaded guilty to conspiring to launder money and violate the Foreign Corrupt Practices Act, while Ng was arrested in Malaysia at the request of DOJ and extradited to the US for prosecution before returning and facing charges in Malaysia.
- December 12: Najib Razak is charged for allegedly tampering with the 1MDB audit report. Arul Kanda is also charged for abetting Najib.

== 2019 ==
- January 17: The prosecution team in former prime minister Najib Razak's SRC International trial has sent a letter to High Court judge Mohd Nazlan Mohd Ghazali expressing its “vigorous objection” to the defence's request to postpone the trial.
- April 3: Former prime minister Najib Razak's SRC International trial begins. Meanwhile, Jho Low's yacht Equanimity is auctioned off to the Genting group for US$126 million. The yacht was subsequently renamed to Tranquility.
- May 8: Attorney General Tommy Thomas says so far Malaysia has recovered US$322 million (RM1.3 billion) worth of 1MDB assets.
- July 4: Red Granite Pictures founder and producer Riza Aziz is arrested in Malaysia on money laundering charges.
- August 27: The High Court sets 11 November as the date to deliver its decision on former prime minister Najib Razak on the SRC International trial.
- August 28: Najib Razak's 1MDB trial begins.
- October 22: Finance Minister Lim Guan Eng said Putrajaya will have forked out RM5.1 billion this year and next to pay debts taken out by 1MDB and its former subsidiary SRC International Sdn Bhd.
- November 4: Finance Minister Lim Guan Eng said the government channelled RM8.93 billion towards paying off 1MDB debt over a two-year period, and its total debt stands at just over RM50 billion.
- November 11: The High Court orders Najib to enter defence on all seven charges involving abuse of SRC International funds.
- December 3: Najib Razak takes the witness stand at the High Court as the first defence witness to answer charges against him.
- December 3: Najib Razak admitted in court that he had known 1MDB-linked businessperson Jho Low and he believed that the man could ease Malaysia's investment dealings in the Middle East.
- December 9: Najib Razak said he did not know funds originating from state-owned SRC International Sdn Bhd had entered his bank accounts and would be insane to willingly endorse such transactions.

== 2020 ==
- January 8: The MACC releases nine phone audio recordings received about a week earlier, recorded between 5 January to 29 July 2016, totaling about 45 minutes, revealing Najib's attempts to cover up investigations into the 1MDB scandal, which MACC chief Latheefa Beebi Koya described as "shocking, as there are attempts at cover-ups and subversion of justice". One of the audio recordings featured a conversation between Najib and his wife Rosmah Mansor, who sounded upset at Najib's mishandling on the scandal. In another audio recording, Najib was seeking help from United Arab Emirates Crown Prince Mohammed bin Zayed Al Nahyan to help clear Najib's stepson, Riza Aziz's involvement in the scandal.
- March 17: Officials from the Malaysia's Prime Minister's Office (PMO) said that Malaysia has recovered US$322 million stolen from the scandal-hit sovereign wealth fund 1MDB, a fraction of the more than US$4.5 billion US prosecutors say was looted.
- April 15: The US Department of Justice returns US$300 million in funds stolen during the 1MDB scandal to Malaysia.
- June 2: The trial of former prime minister Najib Razak on three money-laundering charges involving RM27 million of SRC International Sdn Bhd funds, which was supposed to begin has been vacated.
- June 5: The trial against former prime minister Najib Razak for allegedly pocketing RM42 million from SRC International Sdn Bhd will conclude next month. Following the close of final submissions, Justice Mohd Nazlan Mohd Ghazali ruled that he will deliver his verdict at 10 am on July 28.
- July 28: Former prime minister Najib Razak is found guilty of one count of abuse of power, three counts of criminal breach of trust, three counts of money laundering, a total of seven charges for the SRC International trial. The verdict was announced on the first of five trials related to this scandal. He was sentenced to 12 years imprisonment along with a fine of RM 210 million (US$49.5 million).
- July 24: Malaysia reaches a $3.9bn settlement with US investment bank Goldman Sachs, agreeing to drop its criminal investigation into the bank's role in the 1MDB scandal.
- July 30: Najib Razak has filed an appeal against his 12-year jail sentence and RM210 million fine conviction in the RM42 million SRC International corruption case.
- September 18: The U.S. Department of Justice initiated civil forfeiture proceedings against funds held by a law firm in London. The US$330 million were misappropriated 1MDB money, apparently intended for an oil project in Venezuela that later failed.
- September 25: Former prime minister Najib Razak has been granted a 30-day extension to file a petition of appeal over his conviction and sentencing in the RM42 million SRC International corruption case.
- October 1: Former prime minister Najib Razak's appeal against his conviction and sentence in the SRC International case will be heard by the Court of Appeal beginning Feb 15 next year.
- October 22: The U.S. Department of Justice issued a press release stating that international investment bank Goldman Sachs has agreed to pay $2.9 billion in penalties to regulators around the world, including a record penalty for violating a U.S. anti-corruption law, to resolve probes into its role in the 1MDB scandal.
- December 2: Former prime minister Najib Razak has submitted 307 grounds in his petition of appeal on why he should be freed of the charges of misappropriating RM42 million in SRC International Sdn Bhd funds. Najib's lawyer Harvinderjit Singh confirmed that the petition was filed on Oct 19 and that it contained 307 grounds of appeal.

== 2021 ==
- February 2: Former prime minister Najib Razak's appeal hearing against his conviction and jail sentence for the misappropriation of RM42 million of SRC International Sdn Bhd funds will not proceed on Feb 15.
- April 5: Malaysia's Court of Appeal begins hearing a bid by former Prime Minister Najib Razak to set aside his conviction on corruption charges in a case linked to a multi-billion dollar scandal at 1MDB.
- April 13: Najib Razak's defence team has wrapped up its six-day submission in the former premier's appeal over the RM42 million SRC International corruption case.
- May 12: The Finance Ministry announced that it has recovered another RM1.9 billion in stolen 1MDB funds.
- May 18: Najib Razak's appeal hearing against his conviction and jail sentence for misappropriation of RM42 million in SRC International Sdn Bhd's funds at the Court of Appeal was completed after the court heard the arguments from both parties for 15 days.
- May 20: The ruling government failed to forfeit the RM114 million cash that was part of RM680 million in cash, jewelry and other assets seized from Najib's Pavilion Residence on 17 May 2018 as the prosecution was unable to prove that the money was laundered from the state fund.
- June 21: Subsequent to the 20 May court ruling, the prosecution decided not to appeal the case any further.
- July 2: The government has received RM1.8 billion from AMMB Holdings Bhd, representing the first tranche of the RM2.83 billion settlement related to 1MDB, the Ministry of Finance (MOF) announced.
- August 3: The High Court ordered former prime minister Najib Razak and four other defendants to respond to a suit filed by the SRC International Sdn Bhd for alleged breach of trust and breach of statutory duty in relation to the RM4 billion Retirement Fund Inc (KWAP) loan to SRC by August 30.
- August 26: The High Court in Kuala Lumpur set Nov 10 to hear Umno’s application to strike out a suit filed by SRC International Sdn Bhd against the political party for allegedly receiving a misappropriated sum of RM16 million from the company.
- October 22: Najib files a civil lawsuit against former attorney-general Tommy Thomas and the Malaysian government for having pressed 35 criminal charges against him in four trials, claiming that the then attorney general had allegedly abused his powers to prosecute him.
- November 24: The Court of Appeal maintained Dec 8 for its decision concerning former prime minister Najib Razak's appeal to quash his conviction and sentencing in the RM42 million SRC International corruption case.
- December 3: The Court of Appeal fixes Dec 7 to hear Najib Razak's application to include new evidence.
- December 8: The Court of Appeal has upheld the conviction and sentence of Najib Razak in the SRC International Sdn Bhd case, where Najib was found guilty of misappropriation RM42mil from the company's coffers. The Court of Appeal also said the two monetary flow charts revealed by then attorney-general Apandi five years ago already showed it was not Arab donations that went into Najib's accounts.
- December 10: UMNO has filed an application for a stay of proceedings in a suit against it by SRC International Sdn Bhd for allegedly receiving a misappropriated sum of RM16 million from the company.

== 2022 ==
- January 22: Najib fails in his bid to stay a US$1.1 billion lawsuit filed against him by SRC International Sdn Bhd.
- January 24: Najib is reported seeking to appoint a Queen's Counsel from the United Kingdom to act on his behalf in his appeal to quash his conviction in the RM42 million SRC International corruption case.
- February 9: The Commercial Division of the Kuala Lumpur High Court has granted an ex-parte Mareva injunction to 1MDB and its subsidiaries to freeze Najib or his agents in relation to their claim of US$681 million allegedly going into his personal bank account.
- February 22: Former Treasury secretary-general Mohd Irwan Serigar Abdullah has applied to strike out the suit filed by 1MDB against him and Arul Kanda to pay US$6.59 billion (RM27.6 billion).
- February 24: PKR’s Subang MP Wong Chen has reminded Malaysians that 1MDB is far from over as individuals linked to the scandal remain free while Malaysians are paying off billions of outstanding 1MDB debts.
- March 1: Former Goldman Sachs banker Tim Leissner testified in a US court that two private secretaries of Najib were involved in facilitating the third bond issuance worth US$3 billion for 1MDB. He also testified that he was once told by Jho Low that he had talked to Jared Kushner and others close to then US president Donald Trump on the 1MDB affair.
- March 2: Najib tells the Dewan Rakyat that not a single cent of public funds had been used by the government to repay the principal amount of 1MDB debts. He said this is because various entities, including Goldman Sachs, audit firms KPMG and Deloitte, Ambank and the US Department of Justice (DOJ) had returned 1MDB funds totalling RM23 billion to Malaysia.
- March 15: A Federal Bureau of Investigation (FBI) agent who worked on the 1MDB case testified in court that Najib received US$756 million (RM3.18 billion) of misappropriated 1MDB funds. Meanwhile, Najib is hoping for a retrial over the RM42 million SRC International corruption case, and thus submitted his written explanation on his remark early this month, that the government has yet to service 1MDB's principal debt. Dewan Rakyat Speaker Azhar Azizan Harun’s office confirmed the matter to the media when asked.
- March 16: A five-member Federal Court bench led by Chief Justice Tengku Maimun Tuan Mat has unanimously dismissed Najib's appeal to adduce more evidence to the SRC International Sdn Bhd graft case in a bid to overturn his conviction and sentence.
- March 17: The prosecution objected to Najib's lawyer's line of questioning of a witness in the ex-premier's RM2.28 billion 1MDB corruption trial.
- March 24: The jury in the trial of former Goldman Sachs Group Inc banker Roger Ng was shown hard proof of the treasures bought with money allegedly looted in the multibillion-dollar 1MDB corruption scandal, but the jurors did not see the actual US$23 million necklace with a pink diamond big enough to be a paperweight that was created by prestigious New York jeweller Lorraine Schwartz for Rosmah.
- March 29: 1MDB and one of its subsidiaries obtained ad interim injunction from the High Court to prevent wanted businessman Jho Low rom transferring or dissipating any of his assets in Malaysia amounting to US$1.03 billion.
- March 30: Former auditor-general Madinah Mohamad said the 1MDB matter was an official secret that could not be raised even in government meetings in the past, when explaining why she did not declassify the untampered version of a 1MDB audit report and did not raise it to then prime minister Najib Razak.
- March 31: Madinah testifies that her predecessor Ambrin Buang was reluctant to share with her his opinions on the 1MDB issue.
- March 31: The High Court dismissed UMNO's application to stay proceedings of a suit by SRC International Sdn Bhd against the political party to claim RM16 million which was allegedly wrongfully transferred by the company to the party.
- April 1: The High Court in Kuala Lumpur orders Najib to file his statement of defence on the US$1.18 billion (RM4.9 billion) suit filed by SRC International Sdn Bhd. Former 1MDB chairman Mohd Bakke Salleh told the High Court that he had met fugitive businessman Jho Low, in former prime minister Najib Razak's office when Najib was the defence minister and deputy prime minister, and said that Najib told him to proceed with a US$1 billion joint venture with PetroSaudi International Ltd, despite his own doubts on the deal.
- April 1: A former 1MDB board member testified in court that a total of RM2.28 billion of the Malaysian sovereign wealth fund's monies went into Najib's bank accounts.
- April 8: Roger Ng is convicted in the United States of America of conspiracy to launder money and conspiring to violate U.S. bribery laws.
- April 8: Najib Razak's defence counsel Wan Aizuddin Wan Mohammed confirmed that Najib is set to file his application to get a Queen's Counsel from the United Kingdom to represent him in his appeal in the RM42 million SRC International corruption case by next month.
- April 9: Former prime minister Muhyiddin Yassin wants the 1MDB trial in Malaysia to be expedited.
- April 18: Former prime minister Najib Razak has applied for an extension of time no later than April 25 to file an appeal petition to the Federal Court to set aside his conviction in the case of misappropriation of RM42 million of SRC International Sdn Bhd funds.
- April 20: The application of former Treasury secretary-general Mohd Irwan Serigar Abdullah to strike out the suit filed by 1MDB against him and former 1MDB chief executive officer Arul Kanda Kandasamy that they should pay up US$6.59 billion, will be heard on July 1.
- April 25: Former prime minister Najib Razak has submitted 94 grounds in his petition of appeal on why he should be freed of the charges of misappropriating RM42 million in SRC International Sdn Bhd funds.
- May 9: The Federal Court has fixed 10 days in August to hear Najib Razak's final bid against his conviction and jail sentence for misappropriation of RM42mil in SRC International Sdn Bhd funds.
- June 8: Former prime minister Najib Razak's legal team has filed a fresh bid to nullify the SRC International trial. The filing with the Federal Court seeks to disqualify judge Mohd Nazlan Mohd Ghazali over conflicts of interest.
- June 14: MACC chief commissioner Azam Baki said the total assets forfeited and returned to the Malaysian government in 2021 were worth about RM5.1 billion, with 99.57 percent of it linked to 1MDB.
- June 15: Former finance ministry officer Siti Zauyah Md Desa testified Malaysia still owes US$3 billion (RM13.3 billion) in debt as a result of a joint venture (JV) between 1MDB and Aabar Investments.
- June 28: The case management for former prime minister Najib Razak's application to adduce additional evidence in his SRC case to nullify the trial that saw him sentenced to 12 years’ jail and fined RM210 million, has been rescheduled on June 30.
- July 1: The applications of former Treasury secretary-general Mohd Irwan Serigar Abdullah and former 1MDB chief executive officer Arul Kanda Kandasamy to strike out a US$6.59 billion suit filed by the sovereign fund against them will be heard on Oct 19.
- July 21: The High Court rejected an application for UK Queen's Counsel Jonathan James Laidlaw to represent former Prime Minister Najib Razak in his final appeal against his conviction of misappropriating RM42 million belonging to SRC International Sdn Bhd.
- July 26: Former prime minister Najib Razak has discharged his lead defence lawyer Muhammad Shafee Abdullah and the latter's law firm from representing him in his final appeal against his guilty verdict over the misappropriation of SRC International Sdn Bhd's RM42 million. Najib confirmed that Hisyam Teh Poh Teik would be his lead counsel in the SRC appeal, while the law firm Zaid Ibrahim Suflan TH Liew & Partners will be the solicitors for this case.
- July 26: Najib Razak's newly appointed lawyers are seeking for the apex court to adjourn the scheduled 10-day hearing next month on the former prime minister's appeal in the RM42 million SRC International corruption case.
- August 15: The Federal Court heard an application from Najib to present new evidence. If the court rejects the request for new evidence, Najib's main appeal to overturn the 12-year prison sentence and RM210 million fine will continue.
- August 16: The Federal Court rejected Najib's appeal to include new evidence with an intention to persuade the Court to order a retrial on a claim that the trial judge was biased while convicting him. The court denied any evidence of bias and said it will hear the final appeal by Razak from 18 August.
- August 18: The lawyer for Najib Razak is asking to be allowed to stop representing Najib. The lawyer, Hisyam Teh Poh Teik, says that he is not prepared to continue the case and that it would be better if someone else represented Najib. The judge has told him that he cannot just stop representing Najib and that he must continue until the judge says he can stop.
- August 19: Hisyam Teh has told the Federal Court that Zaid Ibrahim Suflan TH Liew & Partners (ZIST) is no longer representing Najib in his appeal against a conviction for corruption. Hisyam is still Najib's counsel as directed by the panel of judges that dismissed his application to discharge himself previously.
- August 19: Hisyam Teh is refusing to make any submissions on behalf of his client, Najib Razak, in an appeal at the Federal Court. This means that Najib will not have anyone representing him in court. Hisyam is representing another client, who is also Najib's UMNO colleague Zahid Hamidi, in a different trial taking place at the same time, so he is unable to be in two places at once. The five-judge panel hearing the Najib appeal has denied Hisyam's request to postpone the appeal, so it will go ahead as scheduled on Tuesday (Aug 23).
- August 23: The Federal Court of Malaysia upholds the conviction of Najib Razak and he begins his 12-year sentence in Kajang Prison the very same day. He however continues to attend trials for other corruption cases.
- August 31: In the first episode of Whale Hunting: The Search for Jho Low through the YouTube channel Project Brazen, Billion Dollar Whale authors Tom Wright and Bradley Hope reveal that Low is hiding in China, showing a photo of Low celebrating Christmas Eve at Shanghai Disneyland in 2019, and further discuss about his further motives in China.
- September 1: Najib's wife, Rosmah Mansor, is found guilty on three charges of soliciting and receiving bribes to help a company win a $279 million solar power supply contract, and is sentenced to 10 years in prison for each of the three bribery charges and fined 970 million ringgit ($216.45 million).
- September 12: After suspending Najib and Rosmah's titles since 2019 pending court results, the Selangor palace formally strips Najib and Rosmah of their titles. This was followed by the state of Penang just three days later.
- November 30: The Attorney-General's Chambers (AGC) confirmed that it is not appealing against the High Court ruling to return to Najib Razak and his wife Rosmah Mansor the RM80 million worth of jewellery, luxury watches and designer handbags that were confiscated from Pavilion Residences in Kuala Lumpur on May 17, 2018.
- December 6: The Court of Appeal has dismissed Najib Razak’s bid to set aside a Mareva injunction that restrains him from transferring or dissipating any of his assets amounting to RM42 million in view of SRC International Sdn Bhd’s lawsuit against him.

== 2023 ==
- January 9: The Kuala Lumpur High Court issued former Goldman Sachs banker Roger Ng a discharge not amounting to an acquittal (DNAA) over four counts of abetting the company in the sale of security notes and bonds worth US$6.5 billion belonging to 1MDB subsidiaries.
- January 11: The Court of Appeal has fixed July 13 to hear the Malaysian authorities’ appeal to quash a ruling for them to pay RM300,000 compensation to Khairuddin Abu Hassan, a stalwart of former prime minister Mahathir Mohamad, over his 62-detention linked to the 1MDB affair.
- January 13: Deputy prime minister Ahmad Zahid Hamidi called on the judiciary to give former prime minister Najib Razak "fair justice" in his criminal trials.
- January 17: Two Kuala Lumpur High Court judges who presided over two ongoing 1MDB-linked criminal trials have been elevated to the Court of Appeal.
- January 19: An American consultant has been sentenced to two years in jail for illicitly lobbying the former Donald Trump administration to drop the probe into the 1MDB scandal.
- January 19: Lead defence counsel Mohamed Shafee Abdullah denied there was a conspiracy between him and lawyers from law firm Zaid Ibrahim Sufian TH Liew & Partners to delay the hearing of former prime minister Najib Razak’s SRC appeal hearing in 2022.
- January 19: The five-person Federal Court bench chaired by Chief Judge of Sabah and Sarawak Abdul Rahman Sebli agreed to adjourn the proceedings concerning former prime minister Najib Razak’s bid to overturn his guilty verdict as well as the 12-year jail sentence in the SRC International case to next month.
- February 27: Abu Dhabi's International Petroleum Investment Company and its unit Aabar Investments PJS agree with the Malaysian finance ministry to pay a $1.8 billion settlement in their legal dispute.
- March 3: Both Najib and Arul are acquitted of tampering the 1MDB audit report.
- March 13: Deputy Finance Minister Ahmad Maslan says that RM 43.8 billion ($9.7 billion) of 1MDB debts have been paid so far.
- March 31: The Federal Court has dismissed former prime minister Najib Razak's application for leave to review his SRC International case.
- April 26: Pras of the hip hop group Fugees is found guilty on 10 counts by the U.S. District Court for the District of Columbia for allegedly conspiring with Jho Low in lobbying under two presidential terms, first being involved in the illegal transfer of approximately $865,000 from foreign entities into the Obama 2012 presidential campaign (which included Low offering $20 million for posing with President Barack Obama and the First Lady), and for running a back-channel campaign to get the Trump administration to drop investigations upon Low and 1MDB.
- May 29: Kee Kok Thiam, a former aide of Jho Low dies from a stroke aged 56. Earlier in the month, he had returned to Malaysia to reveal to Malaysian authorities about Low's current whereabouts.
- May 30: Billion Dollar Whale author Bradley Hope claims in a tweet that Jho Low is placed under house arrest in Shanghai.
- June 24: Former prime minister Najib Razak has withdrawn his appeals for the discovery of banking documents relating to investment bank Goldman Sachs and former Bank Negara governor Zeti Akhtar Aziz’s family in relation to his RM2.28bil 1MDB trial.
- July 7: Jasmine Loo, another associate to Jho Low, surrenders herself to the police. She later helps police identify RM93.2 million ($19.7 million) of assets bought using 1MDB funds.
- August 25: Najib Razak has failed in his bid to stay his ongoing 1MDB trial in the High Court pending disposal of his appeal to recuse trial judge Collin Lawrence Sequerah.
- September 22: Bank Negara Malaysia analyst Adam Ariff Mohd Roslan said more than £9.45mil of 1MDB loan money was deposited into Najib Razak's private account in 2014.
- October 8: Roger Ng is reported to have returned to Malaysia to assist in investigations.
- November 6: The High Court allowed the prosecution's application to amend three charges involving power abuse and money laundering in Najib Razak's 1MDB case.
- November 6: Deputy Finance Minister I Ahmad Maslan said Malaysia will receive RM4.65bil from Abu Dhabi's International Petroleum Investment Co (IPIC) in 2024 as part of the settlement over the 1MDB scandal.
- November 7: The prosecution has succeeded in its application to amend three charges involving power abuse and money laundering in Najib Razak's 1MDB case.
- November 14: A police money laundering investigator claimed that Najib Razak was uncooperative during interrogation.
- November 24: The Court of Appeal dismissed Najib Razak's appeal to attend the proceedings in 1MDB US$681mil lawsuit which was filed against him and several other individuals.
- December 8: Man On The Run has been picked up by Netflix and is set to be launched globally on Jan 5, 2024, according to online portal Deadline. The documentary casts the spotlight on the 1MDB scandal and the role played by Jho Low and Najib Razak.

== 2024 ==
- January 5: Malaysian Anti-Corruption Commission (MACC) investigating officer Nur Aida Arifin testified that former prime minister Najib Razak claimed that a government-to-government (G-to-G) meeting took place on a yacht in relation to a joint venture between 1MDB and Petrosaudi International (PSI).
- January 8: A MACC investigating officer testified that Najib did not inform the cabinet about 1MDB's US$3.5 billion bond issuance.
- January 12: Najib's legal team has sent a letter to Communications Minister Fahmi Fadzil for the government to compel Netflix to take down the 1MDB-linked documentary Man on the Run.
- January 13: Prime Minister Anwar Ibrahim has said his government was willing to consider Najib Razak's request for a removal and ban of the Man on the Run documentary on Netflix.
- January 23: 1MDB taskforce chairperson Johari Abdul Ghani said the 1MDB taskforce is considering initiating legal action against several foreign banks that facilitated fund transfers related to the sovereign wealth fund without conducting proper Know Your Client processes at that material time.
- January 24: The courtroom drama during Najib Razak's 1MDB corruption trial continued as the defence team locked horns with the prosecution by continuously challenging a star witness' statement, calling it hearsay.
- February 2: Najib Razak's prison sentence in the SRC International case has been reduced from 12 to six years. His fine was also reduced to 50 million ringgit ($10.6m).
- February 19: Najib Razak's defence team today launched a relentless barrage of probing questions at investigating officer Nur Aida Arifin, demanding answers for her decision to withhold evidence obtained through mutual legal assistance (MLA).
- February 26: A Malaysian Anti-Corruption Commission (MACC) senior superintendent told the High Court that several countries had cooperated by providing bank documents through the Mutual Legal Assistance (MLA) to assist investigations into corruption and money laundering charges faced by Najib Razak involving funds belonging to 1MDB.
- February 27: Najib Razak's lead defence counsel Muhammad Shafee Abdullah is on medical leave, leading the Kuala Lumpur High Court to defer the full trial for the RM2.27 billion 1MDB corruption case against Najib to tomorrow.
- April 25: German news tabloid Bild reports that four rare Bugatti Veyrons, believed to be linked to the 1MDB scandal, are seized by police in Munich.
- July 24: The US Justice Department has reached an agreement with the former general counsel of 1MDB Jasmine Loo to recover artwork by Pablo Picasso and a financial account in Switzerland traced to funds allegedly embezzled from 1MDB.
- August 28: The Swiss Federal Criminal Court convicts two PetroSaudi executives, Patrick Mahony and Tarek Obaid, for embezzling over $1.8 billion from 1MDB. They are sentenced to six and seven years respectively in prison, and are required to surrender their assets back to 1MDB.
- October 24: In a statement read by his son Nizar at a press conference, Najib makes an "unreserved" apology to Malaysians for the 1MDB scandal, but maintaining his innocence while blaming Jho Low and PetroSaudi in embezzling funds without his knowledge.
- October 30: The High Court orders Najib to enter his defense on four charges of using his position to obtain gratification totaling RM 2.3 billion in 1MDB funds and 21 money-laundering charges involving the same amount.
- December 19: Rosmah Mansor is acquitted for her money laundering and tax evasion charges.

== 2025 ==
- May 30: Former Goldman Sachs banker Leissner is sentenced to two years in prison.
- December 11: The Attorney-General's Chambers withdraws their appeal for Rosmah Mansor's acquittal on money laundering and tax evasion charges.
- December 22: The Kuala Lumpur High Court rejects Najib's application to serve the remainder of his prison sentence for his SRC International case as house arrest, ruling that the documented order was invalid.
- December 26: Najib is found guilty on all 25 counts of charges related to over $1.0 billion of 1MDB funds that made its way into his personal bank accounts. He was sentenced to fifteen years in prison (to be served upon the end of his SRC International case's sentence) and fined $2.8 billion but will appeal the judgement.

== 2026 ==
- May 6: RM 31.3 billion, 74.5 percent, of the total misappropriated 1MDB funds has been recovered according to Malaysian Anti-Corruption Commission Chief Commissioner Azam Baki.
- May 13: The Wall Street Journal and Bloomberg report that Jho Low is seeking a presidential pardon from President Trump.
