= A+ (yacht) =

Luxury yacht

Topaz
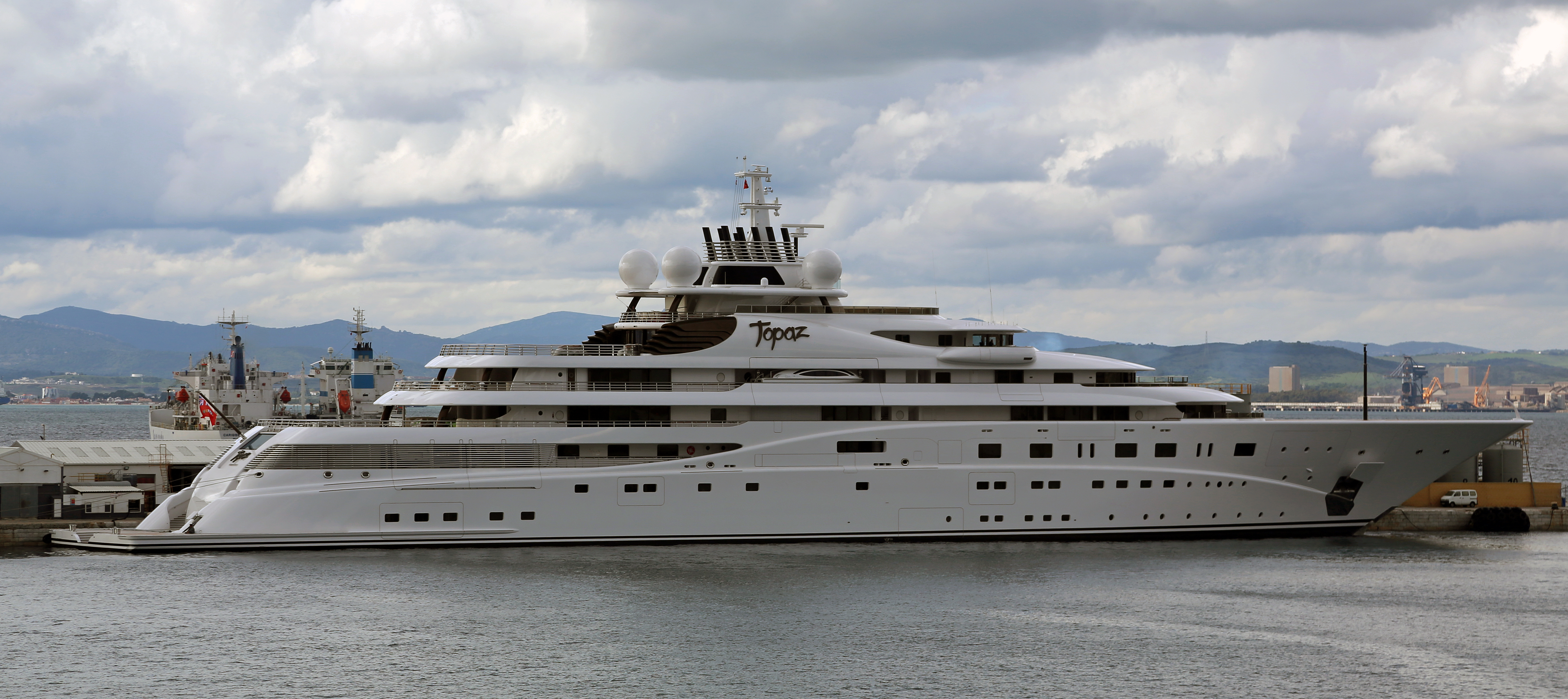
- Topaz at Gibraltar in October 2012

History
- Owner: Mansour bin Zayed Al Nahyan
- Port of registry: Hamilton, Bermuda
- Builder: Lürssen
- Cost: €400 million (approx. $527 million.)
- Launched: 16 May 2012
- Status: In service
- Notes: Call sign: ZGBL4; IMO number: 9551454; MMSI number: 319054000

General characteristics
- Type: Motor yacht
- Tonnage: 12,532 GT
- Displacement: 900 tonnes
- Length: 147 m (482 ft 3 in)
- Beam: 21.50 m (70 ft 6 in)
- Draft: 5.50 m (18 ft 1 in)

A+ is a luxury superyacht built in 2012 as Topaz by Lürssen Werft in Bremen, Germany. She was renamed A+ in 2019.

== History ==
Topaz was launched on 16 May 2012.

Topaz was partially acquired with funds from the 1MDB investment fund, which embroiled the yacht in controversy as part of the 1Malaysia Development Berhad scandal.

== Design ==
The yacht's interior was designed by Terence Disdale Design and the exterior designed by Tim Heywood.

== Description ==
The yacht, with a length of 147 metres (482 ft 3 in) and beam of 21.50 m (70 ft 6 in), measures 11,589 gross tons. Topaz was built in the same German shipyard as the Azzam, the world's largest private yacht.

The vessel features a steel displacement hull, an aluminium superstructure and consists of eight decks. This yacht was originally being built in a 169 m (554 ft) dry dock but to complete the project, the yacht had to be taken to a 220 m (720 ft) dock to be built alongside. When launched in 2012, Topaz was the world's fourth-largest luxury yacht.

=== Engineering ===
The main engines are twin Pielstick diesel engines, each with power of 7,990 horsepower (5,960 kW). This is enough power for the yacht to reach a service speed of 22.9 knots (42.4 km/h; 26.4 mph), while the maximum speed is over 25.5 knots (47.2 km/h; 29.3 mph).

=== Interior ===
A+ is equipped with zero-speed stabilisers, Jacuzzi (on deck), double helicopter landing pads, swimming pool, tender garage, swimming platform, air conditioning, underwater lights. There is also a fitness hall, cinema and a large conference room.

== See also ==
- List of motor yachts by length
- Tranquility (yacht)
