= The Kleptocrats =

2018 American documentary film

- Directed by: Sam Hobkinson & Havana Marking
- Produced by: Mike Lerner
- Release date: November 9, 2018 (DOC NYC)
- Running time: 84 minutes
- Countries: United Kingdom; United States
- Language: English

The Kleptocrats is a 2018 documentary film produced by Mike Lerner and directed by Sam Hobkinson and Havana Marking that investigates the theft of over $3 billion from Malaysian government fund 1MDB. The scandal implicated several public figures, such as the former prime minister of Malaysia, Najib Razak, his stepson, Riza Aziz, and missing fugitive Jho Low.

The film premiered at the 2018 DOC NYC.

== Synopsis ==
Part of the money allegedly went to Red Granite Pictures, a lavish birthday party for Jho Low in Las Vegas, several real estate properties (a penthouse in New York City and a Mansion in Los Angeles), a superyacht (The Equinimity), and a private jet.

== Cast ==
The Kleptocrats contains interviews with investigative reporters from The New York Times, The Wall Street Journal, & The Hollywood Reporter who investigated the scandal as it happened, as well as figures close the scandal, such as Razak's brother, Nazir, a Malaysian opposition politician, a young student activist, and a political cartoonist.

Subjects:

- Jho Low, Malaysian businessman and now wanted fugitive who was listed for "Special Thanks" in the end credits of the wolf of Wall Street
- Najib Razak, former Prime Minister of Malaysia
- Rosmah Mansor, wife of Najib Razak, whose jewelry and other items were seized by authorities
- Riza Aziz, stepson of Najib, who also went to school with Jho Low in London, and co-founded Red Granite Pictures

== Reception ==
The film holds a 100% approval rating on Rotten Tomatoes, based on six reviews with an average rating of 8/10.

Lawyers representing Jho Low asked platforms hosting the film to remove it.
