= Mohd Irwan Serigar Abdullah =

Malaysian former Secretary General of the Treasury

Yang Berbahagia Tan Sri Dato' Mohd Irwan Serigar Abdullah PSM SPSK DCSM SSAP DIMP
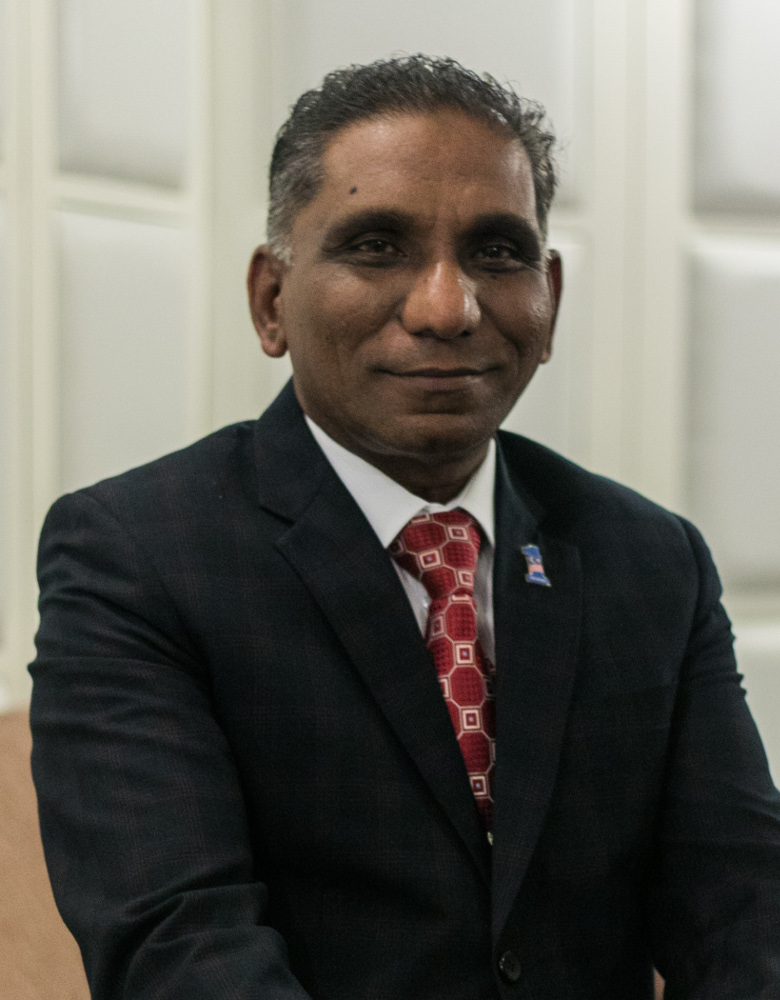

Secretary General of the Treasury Ministry of Finance
- In office 2011 – 14 May 2018
- Succeeded by: Ismail Bakar

Personal details
- Born: Mohd. Irwan Serigar bin Abdullah; 7 March 1957 (age 69) Kota Bharu, Kelantan, Federation of Malaya
- Education: University of Malaya; University of Pennsylvania; International Islamic University

Mohd Irwan Serigar bin Abdullah (born 7 March 1957) served as the Secretary General of the Treasury in the Ministry of Finance from 2011 to May 14, 2018. He was also chairman of the Malaysian Global Innovation and Creativity Center (MaGIC) and the founder and patron of the Global Entrepreneurship Movement (GEM), a networking platform. Mohd Irwan also held the portfolio of Secretary General of the Treasury at Central Bank and Executive Director at Universiti Putra Malaysia (UPM), the Institute of Strategic and International Studies (ISIS) Malaysia and Pendinginan Megajana Sdn. Bhd. Prior to that, he was appointed Deputy Under-Secretary in the Economic and International Division in the Ministry of Finance in 2007 and Under-Secretary in the same division in 2008.

== Education ==
Mohd Irwan obtained a Bachelor of Demographic Studies (Hons) from the University of Malaya, Kuala Lumpur in 1982 before furthering his studies at the University of Pennsylvania, Philadelphia, United States with a Master of Science in Energy, Management and Policy. Mohd Irwan received his doctorate degree from the International Islamic University in Kuala Lumpur. He also participated in an advanced management program organized by the Harvard Business School during the Spring 2008 session.

== Career ==
=== Early career ===
Mohd Irwan started his career in the public sector in the Economic Planning Unit in the Prime Minister's Department in 1984. His position at that time was as Assistant Director from 1984 to 1986. He then served as Assistant Director of Industry Division, Economic Planning Unit from 1986 to 1987. From 1987 to 1998, he was the Senior Assistant Director of the Energy Division. Beginning in 1999, he served as Senior Assistant Director of the Privatization Division, Economic Planning Unit. In 2003, he joined the Economic and International Division, Ministry of Finance as Chief Assistant Secretary. From 2004 to 2006, Mohd Irwan was appointed as Head of Econometrics Section, Economic and International Division of the Ministry of Finance, subsequently appointed Head of Multi Lateral Relations in the same division in 2006. His career continued by holding the role of Deputy Secretary General (Policy) in 2011 and Secretary General of the Treasury in 2012.

Mohd Irwan also served as a Director of Felda Global Ventures Holdings Berhad from November 29, 2012, to July 16, 2013; Non-Executive Director of Selangor Water Supply Company; Non-Independent Non-Executive Director of Padiberas Nasional Bhd. from August 26, 2011, to April 2013. He was also entrusted to hold the position of Non-Independent Non-Executive Director at AmanahRaya-JMF Asset Management Sdn. Bhd. and Manager of the AmanahRaya Property Investment Trust Fund since November 29, 2007. Apart from being involved in trust management at AmanahRaya, he is also one of the trustees in the National Equity Foundation.

=== Late career ===
Mohd Irwan was appointed as chairman of Malaysia's Retirement Fund (KWAP) on August 24, 2012. He was also a member of the Blue Ocean Strategy Group (NBOS) in the Economic Planning Unit, PRO3-Based Learning Project Steering Committee at the Germany-Malaysia Institute (GMI) also the Strategic API Steering Committee and the Strategic Planning Panel at the Ministry of Finance. In May 2017, he was given the role of leading TRX City and Bandar Malaysia. Under the governance of Mohd Irwan as the Secretary General of the Treasury, Ministry of Finance implemented various initiatives such as National Transformation 2050 and National Sandbox Regulation. On February 8, 2018, Mohd Irwan through MaGIC implemented another initiative with his partners, pioneering the Malaysian Socially Participating and Dynamic Entrepreneurship (MasSIVE) movement. Among MaGIC's partners are Impact4Humanity, iM4U, myHarapan, Malaysian Innovation Agency (AIM), Yayasan Hasanah, eFM, and ngohub.Asia.

=== 1MDB ===
Along with former Malaysian prime minister Najib Razak, Mohd Irwan has been charged for criminal breach of trust in relation to the 1Malaysia Development Berhad scandal. In addition, 1MDB has alleged that Mohd Irwan conspired to cause the company to suffer losses and damages. In this regard, 1MDB has demanded that Mohd Irwan pay US$6.59 billion.

=== Honors ===
Abdullah is the recipient of various awards and degrees at the federal, state and administrative levels, including in the Economic Planning Unit. The awards he received include the 1989 Outstanding Service Award in the Economic Planning Unit, the 1989 Outstanding Service Award in the Prime Minister's Department, the 1996 Outstanding Service Award in the Economic Planning Unit, and the 2005 Outstanding Service Award in the Ministry of Finance. He also received the Best Working Paper award at the First International Conference of the Asian Applied Business Academy in 2003.

== Honours ==
- Malaysia
  - Commander of the Order of Loyalty to the Crown of Malaysia (PSM) – Tan Sri (2013)
- Kelantan
  - Knight Commander of the Order of Loyalty to the Crown of Kelantan (SPSK) – Dato' (2012)
- Malacca
  - Knight Commander of the Exalted Order of Malacca (DCSM) – Datuk Wira (2012)
- Pahang
  - Knight Grand Companion of the Order of Sultan Ahmad Shah of Pahang (SSAP) – Dato' Sri (2012)
  - Knight Companion of the Order of the Crown of Pahang (DIMP) – Dato' (2006)
