= Mohamed Shafee Abdullah =

Malaysian lawyer

Yang Berbahagia Tan Sri Dato' Sri Mohamed Shafee Abdullah PSM SSAP DIMP

Commissioner of the Human Rights Commission of Malaysia
- In office April 2004 – April 2010

Personal details
- Born: Mohamed Shafee bin Mohamed Abdullah; 4 February 1952 (age 74) Pulau Pinang, Crown Colony of Penang (now part of Malaysia)
- Citizenship: Malaysian
- Spouse(s): Puan Sri Dr Suriana Harith; Sabera Shaik; Datuk Tania Scivetti
- Children: Muhammad Farhan Shafee; Atiya Scivetti
- Relatives: Dr. Mohamed Omar (brother); Halimatus Saadiah (sister); Fatimah Bevi (sister)
- Education: Royal Military College
- Alma mater: University of Malaya (LLB); London School of Economics (LLM)
- Occupation: Lawyer

Mohamed Shafee bin Mohamed Abdullah (born 4 February 1952) is a Malaysian lawyer.

He is defending the former prime minister Najib Razak, who was charged with money laundering roughly RM42 million.

== Early life and education ==
Mohamed Shafee was born on 4 February, 1952 in the then Crown Colony of Penang, youngest of four children of Mohamed Abdullah Mohamed Yusoff and Habibah bte Sheik Md Hassan. His father was an Indian national who migrated to Malaya in the 1930s as an adolescent, while his mother was an Indian Muslim from Malaya. Mohamed Abdullah was a successful clothing businessman while Habibah was a housewife. He completed his secondary education at Royal Military College and graduated with a Second Lieutenant ranking in 1972. He obtained Bachelor of Laws (LLB) from the University of Malaya (UM) in 1977 and Master of Laws (LLM) from the London School of Economics in 1984.

== Law career ==
=== Representative of Suhakam to AICHR ===
Mohamed Shafee is the Commissioner of the Human Rights Commission of Malaysia (Suhakam). On 22 October 2009 he was appointed to represent Malaysia to the ASEAN Intergovernmental Commission on Human Rights (AICHR) - the first body of its kind in the Asia Pacific region. Leaders of ASEAN countries were also present in conjunction with the 15th ASEAN Summit in Hua Hin, Thailand. Shafee's name was proposed by Wisma Putra and accepted by Prime Minister of Malaysia, Najib Razak.

=== Defending Rais Yatim ===
On 13 January 2012, he became a lawyer for the Minister of Information Communication and Culture, Rais Yatim in a defamation suit and contempt of court involving blogger Amizudin Ahmat. On Jan 31, 2011, Rais, 69, filed a suit against Amizudin, 42, who is also a member of the Angkatan Muda Parti Keadilan Rakyat (PKR) committee in relation to an article published in the sharpshooterblogger.blogspot.com blog, on or around December 28, 2010.

=== Representative of Malaysian Government to the US ===
On April 18, 2012, the online portal Malaysiakini revealed that he was appointed by Prime Minister of Malaysia Najib Razak and his wife Datin Sri Rosmah Mansor for confidential assignments abroad from 2 to 25 April 2012. The contents of his letter were revealed in the Dewan Rakyat by Datuk Saifuddin Nasution Ismail (PKR-Machang) while debating the Penal Code (Amendment) Bill 2012. Shafee appointed by the Malaysian government to carry out sensitive legal duties abroad that must be completed before the general election. Among the locations he visited were New York, London, Dubai Paris and Basel, Switzerland. Minister in the Prime Minister's Department Mohamed Nazri Abdul Aziz could not confirm the application letter dated 23 March 2012 regarding the exemption from trial during that period.

=== Defending Abdul Razak Baginda ===
He was one of the advocates for Abdul Razak Baginda in the murder case of Altantuya Shaariibuu.

=== Defending Team B UMNO ===
He was also one of the individuals who caused UMNO to be banned by the court in 1986, representing the party that later formed the Semangat 46 party, during the UMNO internal turmoil at the time.

=== Anwar Ibrahim sodomy trial II ===
Dato 'Seri Anwar Ibrahim had three times tried to drop Shafee from the prosecution on the grounds of disqualification, conflict of interest and breach of ethics, but without success. Former president of the Bar Council, Dato 'Ambiga Sreenevasan stated that it had never happened before for a public prosecutor to blame the accused after the court made a decision. According to Mingguan Malaysia, Shafee was willing to swear in the holy land of Mecca to prove Anwar guilty.

After the trial, Anwar Ibrahim was found guilty and sentenced to five years in prison. It turns out that Shafee as the prosecutor won the case. For Abdul Talib Osman, he never appointed anyone outside the AGC to prosecute. There is no need to appoint someone from outside.

== Controversies ==
On 13 September 2018, Mohamed Shafee was led into Kuala Lumpur Sessions Court to face two counts of money laundering and two counts of making false statements. According to the charge sheet, Shafee was alleged to have engaged in two counts of money laundering activities by receiving proceeds from illegal activities amounting to RM9.5 million, the sum was allegedly transferred to Shafee in two tranches from a bank account belonging to former prime minister Najib Razak. He has since been fully acquitted of the charges without his defense being called.

== Honours ==
=== Honours of Malaysia ===
- Malaysia :
  - Commander of the Order of Loyalty to the Crown of Malaysia (PSM) – Tan Sri (2013)
- Pahang :
  - Knight Companion of the Order of the Crown of Pahang (DIMP) – Dato' (2001)
  - Grand Knight of the Order of Sultan Ahmad Shah of Pahang (SSAP) – Dato' Sri (2009)

=== Honorary degrees ===
  - Honorary Doctor of Law (LL.D.) degree from University of East London (2010)
