= Abdul Gani Patail =

Malaysian prosecutor and former Attorney General of Malaysia

Yang Berbahagia Tan Sri Datuk Seri Panglima Abdul Gani Patail PMN PSM SPDK SJMK SUMW SSIS SSAP DGSM DPMP PNBS PGDK KMN

8th Attorney General of Malaysia
- In office 1 January 2002 – 27 July 2015
- Monarchs: Sirajuddin; Mizan Zainal Abidin; Abdul Halim
- Prime Minister: Mahathir Mohamad; Abdullah Ahmad Badawi; Najib Razak
- Preceded by: Ainum Mohd Saaid
- Succeeded by: Mohamed Apandi Ali

Personal details
- Born: 6 October 1955 (age 70) Lahad Datu, Crown Colony of North Borneo (now Sabah, Malaysia)
- Spouse: Maimon Arif
- Education: University of Malaya
- Profession: Prosecutor

Abdul Gani bin Patail (born 6 October 1955) is a Malaysian prosecutor. He was the Attorney General of Malaysia from 2002 to 2015, the first from Sabah to hold the position (hailing from Lahad Datu and was born in Lahad Datu district).

In July 2015, Abdul Gani informed police that investigators had enough information to prepare a charge sheet against Prime Minister Najib Razak. Yet Abdul Gani was later removed from his position for "health reasons" and replaced by Mohamed Apandi Ali.

== Background ==
Abdul Gani Patail graduated with a Bachelor of Laws (Hons) degree from the University of Malaya in 1979. He began his legal career the following year as a Deputy Public Prosecutor (the title for a prosecuting officer in Malaysia) in Kota Kinabalu, Sabah. In 1985, he was promoted to Senior Federal Counsel for Sabah.

Gani also amongst the graduate of University Malaya alongside Sudirman Haji Arshad, Idrus Harun (Former General Solicitor, and the Former Attorney General of Malaysia), Amdan Mat Din (father of Aizat Amdan - Malaysian Singer ) in final examination of 1979/1980 academic years.

In January 1994, Abdul Gani moved to the Attorney General's Chambers in Kuala Lumpur. There he was appointed Head of the Prosecution Division (1994 and again in 2000), Head of the Advisory and International Division (1995) and Commissioner of Law Revision (1997).

On 1 January 2002, he was appointed Attorney General of Malaysia.

Abdul Gani's tenure as Attorney General ended in 2015 when the Chief Secretary to the Government announced he had stepped down for health reasons. The announcement was abrupt, and Patail himself was apparently unaware of the decision to have him removed from his post. Prior to this, he was head of a multi-agency taskforce investigating claims of misappropriation of funds allegedly involving prime minister Najib Razak.

== Investigating 1MDB corruption scandal ==
On 2 July 2015, The Wall Street Journal (WSJ) reported that Malaysian investigators have traced nearly US$700 million of deposits into what they believe are personal bank accounts of Prime Minister Najib Razak.

Corruption allegations swirling around the debt-laden state investment fund 1Malaysia Development Berhad (1MDB) pose the biggest threat to Najib's credibility since he took office in 2009. The prime minister chairs the state-owned firm's advisory board.

On 4 July 2015, Abdul Gani confirms he received documents from an official investigation making the link between Najib and 1MDB. The documents pave the way for possible criminal charges.

On 27 July 2015, chief secretary to the government Ali Hamsa released a statement announcing that Abdul Gani had health problems and would be replaced by former Federal Court judge Mohamed Apandi Ali. A constitutional lawyer had told Malaysiakini that Abdul Gani could institute a legal challenge on his removal after claiming he did not know he was withdrawn from leading the Attorney General Chambers, by asking the courts to interpret Article 145 (5) and (6).

On 16 May 2018, Prime Minister Mahathir Mohamad, following a meeting with Abdul Gani, revealed that the latter told him he was in the midst of preparing to charge Najib when he was removed.

In August 2020, Ali Hamsa, who was chief secretary to the government from 2012 to 2018, testified in court that he had personally handed a termination letter to Abdul Gani in 2015, which was drafted by his assistant in Najib Razak's presence.

== Honours ==
=== Honours of Malaysia ===
- Malaysia
  - Commander of the Order of the Defender of the Realm (PMN) – Tan Sri (2005)
  - Commander of the Order of Loyalty to the Crown of Malaysia (PSM) – Tan Sri (2003)
  - Officer of the Order of the Defender of the Realm (KMN) (1993)
- Federal Territory (Malaysia)
  - Grand Knight of the Order of the Territorial Crown (SUMW) – Datuk Seri Utama (2015)
- Kelantan
  - Knight Grand Commander of the Order of the Life of the Crown of Kelantan (SJMK) – Dato' (2003)
- Malacca
  - Grand Commander of the Exalted Order of Malacca (DGSM) – Datuk Seri (2004)
- Pahang
  - Knight Grand Companion of the Order of Sultan Ahmad Shah of Pahang (SSAP) – Dato' Sri (2005)
- Perlis
  - Knight Commander of the Order of the Crown of Perlis (DPMP) – Dato' (1995)
- Sabah
  - Grand Commander of the Order of Kinabalu (SPDK) – Datuk Seri Panglima (2002)
  - Commander of the Order of Kinabalu (PGDK) – Datuk (2001)
- Sarawak
  - Knight Commander of the Most Exalted Order of the Star of Sarawak (PNBS) – Dato Sri (2009)
- Selangor
  - Knight Grand Companion of the Order of Sultan Sharafuddin Idris Shah (SSIS) – Dato' Setia (2003)

== See also ==
- 1Malaysia Development Berhad scandal
- Corruption in Malaysia
