= Social journalism =

Media model

Social journalism is a media model consisting of a hybrid of professional journalism, contributor and reader of content. The format relies on community involvement, audience engagement, social newsgathering and verification, data and analytics, and relationship-building. Social journalism takes place on some open publishing platforms, like Twitter and WordPress.com, but can also involve professional journalists, who created and/or screen the content. CNN's now-defunct iReport was an example of a social journalism collaboration between professionals and citizens; other examples include Forbes.com, infoStraight.com, Medium, BuzzFeed, Soapbox and Gawker. The model, which in some instances has generated monthly audiences in the tens of millions, has been discussed as one way for professional journalism to thrive despite a marked decline in the audience for traditional journalism. Social journalism is not just focused on delivering the news, but involves within the community it covers.

== Publishers as platforms ==
Writing in Re/code, Jonathan Glick, CEO of Sulia, said the model of publishers as platforms (which he calls a "platisher") is "on the rise". Glick cites as examples Medium (from Twitter co-founders Evan Williams and Biz Stone), Vox Media, Sulia, Skift, First Look Media (backed by eBay founder Pierre Omidyar) and BuzzFeed. On March 12, 2014, Mark Little, the CEO of Storyful, now a division of News Corp., proposed "10 Principles that Power Social Journalism," including "UGC (user-generated content) is governed by the same legal and ethical code as any other content" and "The currency of social journalism is authenticity not authority. We are not experts in every subject."

== The new rules ==
On April 1, 2014, in a column in GigaOM entitled "Social journalism and open platforms are the new normal — now we have to make them work" Mathew Ingram asked "How can media entities take advantage of this phenomenon without losing their way in the process?" and proceeded to review suggested rules for social journalism proposed by former FastCompany.com president Ed Sussman, an early adopter of the model. Ingram summarized these suggestions, including clear labeling types of contributors (e.g. staff, guest contributor, reader contribution); establishing guidelines, such as conflict of interest rules, that posters must consent to before posting; providing wiki-like tools for social improvements to content; elevating the best content with curators and algorithms; deleting weak or problematic content via curators or algorithms.

Social journalism was attacked by media critic Michael Wolff in USA Today as the "Forbes vanity model letting ‘contributors’ write whatever they want under your brand (‘as I wrote in Forbes …’) and not having to pay them anything — ultimately, of course, devaluing your authority."

In a March 20, 2014 op-ed for The New York Observer, Sussman argued that social journalism does not devalue the authority of brands and that the success of Forbes.com in attracting a wide audience with its 1,000+ bloggers proved that the model could be successful for traditional media companies. Following revelations that some Forbes.com contributors used their columns to allegedly participate in a "pump and dump" scheme to promote, then sell stocks, he followed up with "The New Rules of Social Journalism: A Proposal" in Pando Daily, on March 29, 2014.
