= Economic policy of the Najib Razak government =

The economic policy of the Najib Razak government marked a shift away from the state-oriented economic programmes of previous Malaysian governments. Najib Razak's government introduced various policies to liberalise the economy during his premiership from 2009 to 2018. This included a New Economic Model, subsidy reforms, international free trade agreements and stimulus packages.

== New Economic Model ==
On 2 May 2009, Prime Minister Najib Razak announced the government's plan to develop a new economic model that will speed Malaysia's transition to a high income country. The plan will emphasise ways to increase the income and productivity of workers by encouraging knowledge industries and increasing investment from overseas.

The goal of the NEM, according to Najib, is to "transform the Malaysian economy to become one with high incomes and quality growth" by 2020. At the time of the plan's unveiling in 2010, per capita annual income in Malaysia stood at 23,100 Malaysian ringgit, approximately $7,000 in US currency; under the plan that figure would more than double to RM49,500 (US$15,000).

The keys to the plan as described by Najib on 30 March at the unveiling are "high income, sustainability and inclusiveness". The goal is to stimulate economic growth by improving worker productivity across all sectors of society, in part through an improved system of affirmative action, with an eye towards sustainability. Among other reforms meant to accomplish this goal, the NEM seeks to empower the private sector and to reduce fiscal disparity between the wealthiest and poorest of Malaysians.

The plan is intended to replace the New Economic Policy (NEP). Najib criticised the way that the NEP had been implemented over its 40-year history, arguing that affirmative action policies of the NEP needed to be better targeted.

== Economic liberalisation ==
Malaysia has implemented measures to attract and maintain foreign investment, including a moderation of preferences designed to benefit ethnic Malays. Specifically, these reforms include allowing foreign investors to hold majority stakes in most enterprises excluding "strategic" industries such as banking, telecommunications, and energy, easing insurance regulation, curtailing powers of the Foreign Investment Committee and lowering the minimum quota for Malay ownership in publicly traded companies from 30 percent to 12.5 percent. As he introduced the reforms, Najib stated, "The world is changing quickly and we must be ready to change with it or risk being left behind."

Since these reforms have been implemented, the American banking firms Goldman Sachs and Citigroup have been granted permission to expand their operations in Malaysia, Goldman Sachs, received licenses to set up fund management and advisory operations in Malaysia. Citigroup has obtained a permit to offer brokerage services in Malaysia. The approval of these licenses is a sharp break from Malaysia's history of domestically dominated and tightly regulated markets for financial services.

Under Najib, the Malaysian central bank has increasingly allowed the ringgit to appreciate and has plans to allow settlement and borrowing denominated in ringgit to be conducted offshore. Najib says that exporters will not be hurt by these actions.

== Reform of government subsidies ==
Najib has started to implement comprehensive reform of government subsidies. On 16 July 2010 subsidies for petrol, diesel and LPG were cut as part of Malaysia's general programme of reducing and rationalising subsidies per the 10th Malaysia Plan and the New Economic Model. The government believes it will save RM750 million by the end of 2010 through these measures with little negative impact on most citizens. Sugar and fuel subsidies were selected for reform due to the fact that they disproportionately benefit the wealthy and foreigners, encourage over-consumption and create opportunities for fraud and smuggling. The Prime Minister expressed his hope that Malaysians would adopt a healthier lifestyle. He said, "there is no logic in the government allocating subsidies worth almost RM1 billion on a commodity that could endanger the people's health." Responding to concerns about how these reforms might affect the poor the Prime Minister's Office pointed out that Malaysia will still be spending RM7.82 billion per year on fuel and sugar subsidies and that prices for these commodities would remain the lowest in Southeast Asia. The government also stated that education and healthcare would continue receiving state support.

== Free trade agreements ==
Najib has aggressively promoted free trade and his government has implemented three free trade agreements. These include the Asean FTA (AFTA), Asean-Australia-New Zealand FTA (AANZFTA) and Asean-India FTA in Goods.

Under Najib's government Malaysia signed a free-trade agreement (FTA) with New Zealand on 26 October 2009 to take effect 1 August 2010. The agreement will reduce or eliminate tariffs on thousands of industrial and agricultural products. The two countries have also agreed to reciprocal Most Favoured Nation status in private education, engineering services, environmental protection, mining services and information technology.

Najib and Indian Prime Minister Manmohan Singh signed agreements to co-operate in the areas of higher education and finance. The two countries have agreed to sign a free-trade agreement before the end of 2010 and Najib called for signing a "Comprehensive Economic Cooperation Agreement" by the same date. These economic agreements have resulted in plans for RM1.6 billion in investment for Malaysia. In January 2010 Najib announced plans to develop a new visa regime for Indian nationals, specifically for managers and knowledge workers to visit Malaysia.

== Stimulus packages ==
The Malaysian government passed two stimulus packages to mitigate the effects of the global economic turn-down. The first stimulus package, worth RM7 billion, was announced on 4 November 2008. The second package, worth RM60 billion, was announced on 10 March 2009. Since assuming office as Prime Minister, Najib has been monitoring the progress of the stimulus packages on a weekly basis. Government economists believe that the stimulus packages have successfully generated increased economic activity, especially in the construction sector. Malaysia's central bank reported that Malaysia's economy grew at an annualised rate of 9.5% during the first half of 2010. Prime Minister Najib says the country is on track to meet the 6% average annual growth to reach its goal of becoming a developed country by 2020. Commenting on this same economic data Najib says that as of August 2010 there are no plans for further economic stimulus. Rather he says the government would focus on improving Malaysia's economic fundamentals and increasing investment. "We must avoid frequently introducing stimulus packages, because every time we introduce a stimulus package it increases the deficit and it cannot be done on a sustained basis," said Najib who went on to describe stimulus as a last resort.
