= Mohamed Apandi Ali =

Malaysian politician

Yang Berbahagia Tan Sri Dato' Mohamed Apandi Ali PMN SPSK SSAP SIMP PSM DGSM DPMK DSAP

9th Attorney General of Malaysia
- In office 27 July 2015 – 4 June 2018
- Monarchs: Abdul Halim; Muhammad V
- Prime Minister: Najib Razak; Mahathir Mohamad
- Preceded by: Abdul Gani Patail
- Succeeded by: Tommy Thomas

Personal details
- Born: 11 February 1950 (age 76) Kota Bharu, Kelantan, Federation of Malaya (now Malaysia)
- Party: United Malays National Organisation (UMNO)
- Other political affiliations: Barisan Nasional (BN)
- Spouse: Faridah Begum K.A. Abdul Kader
- Children: 7
- Education: University of London (LL.B.)

Mohamed Apandi bin Ali (born 11 February 1950) is a Malaysian lawyer and politician who was the Attorney General of Malaysia from 2015 to 2018. Six months after assuming office, he cleared then prime minister Najib Razak of any wrongdoing in the 1Malaysia Development Berhad (1MDB) and SRC International cases and marked the investigation for "no further action".

== Education ==
Apandi graduated with a Bachelor of Laws (Honours) from the University of London in 1972, and was called to the Bar of England and Wales in 1973.

== Career ==
In 1973, Apandi joined the Malaysian Judicial and Legal Service, with his first assignment as Magistrate at Kuala Terengganu. Subsequently, he served as Director of Legal Aid in Kota Bharu, Kelantan (1975–77), Deputy Public Prosecutor for the States of Kelantan and Terengganu (1977–80), and Legal Advisor to the Ministry of Trade and Industry Malaysia (1980–82).

Between 1982 until 2003, Apandi engaged in private practice. In 1990, he contested the Pengkalan Chapa, Kelantan constituency as a candidate for the United Malay National Organization but lost with 26.5 percent of the votes.

In 2003, he was appointed as a Judicial Commissioner of the High Court of Malaya, Kuantan, and the next year, appointed as a Judge of the High Court of Malaya, first serving in Kuantan and then Kuala Lumpur. In April 2010, he was elevated to the Court of Appeal, Putrajaya, and in September 2013, to judge of the Federal Court, Putrajaya.

From 2013 to 2015, Apandi served as a judge of the Federal Court, which is Malaysia's highest court of appeal. On 27 July 2015, then Prime Minister Najib Razak summarily dismissed the Attorney General of Malaysia, Abdul Gani Patail, and appointed Apandi to replace him. Apandi served as Attorney General until dismissed by then Prime Minister Mahathir Mohamad on 4 June 2018.

== Controversies and issues ==
=== 1MDB scandal ===
At a press conference on 26 January 2016, Apandi cleared Prime Minister Najib Razak of wrongdoing in relation to the transfer of funds from Malaysian government company SRC to his personal bank accounts. Apandi declared that he was satisfied that the funds originated from a personal donation by the royal family of Saudi Arabia, had been returned, and marked the investigation for no further action.

However, at the press conference, Apandi contradicted himself by presenting two flow-charts ostensibly showing the Saudi donations but that actually showed that the funds originated from SRC. The Malaysian Anti-Corruption Commission revealed that it intended to refer Apandi's decision of no further action to an independent review panel.

Former MCA president Ling Liong Sik challenged Apandi's conclusion. "People are shocked. ... I was having a dinner with an ex-minister, and he asked me to name one person who is given RM2.6 billion and returns it. ... (This) cannot be true. Do you believe it? If you return RM10 which I gave you, it's okay (but not RM2.6 billion). ... You are taking the people for fools."

On 11 May 2018, then Prime Minister Mahathir Mohamad said he would review Apandi, saying he “undermined his own credibility.” Mahathir accused Apandi of breaking the law by hiding evidence on the misappropriation of funds in sovereign investment firm 1MDB.

On 15 May 2018, Mahathir placed Apandi on leave. Apandi and three other officials were barred from leaving Malaysia. On 4 June, Apandi was dismissed as Attorney General, and replaced by Tommy Thomas.

On 15 April 2021, during the hearing of the appeal of Najib Razak against his conviction by the High Court of abuse of office, criminal breach of trust, and money laundering, lead prosecutor V Sithambaram referred to findings of the High Court. The High Court noted that the two flow charts which Apandi held up during the 26 January 2016 press conference clearly showed that the funds which entered Najib's accounts were actually from Malaysian government company SRC and not from Arab donations or any other source. In its judgement denying Najib's appeal, the Court of Appeal referred to the two flow charts as proving Najib's guilt.

On 27 July 2022, Klang MP Charles Santiago lodged a police report against Apandi for abuse of power in covering up investigations into the SRC International and 1MDB matters. The next day, Selangor deputy police chief Sasikala Devi Subramaniam revealed that federal police had opened an investigation of Apandi under Section 217 of the Penal Code for abuse of power, while handling investigations into the now defunct 1Malaysia Development Berhad (1MDB).

=== Suggested freedom for Indonesian fugitive ===
In 2009, Indonesian businessman, Djoko Tjandra, was convicted of corruption related to Bank Bali. He absconded to Papua New Guinea and then to Malaysia. On 22 July 2020, former Attorney General of Indonesia, Muhammad Prasetyo, recounted that Apandi had personally requested that he drop Djoko's conviction and allow him to return to Indonesia as a free man. Malaysiakini contacted Apandi for comment but he declined.

== Legal suits ==
=== Lim Kit Siang defamation case ===
On 5 July 2019, Apandi sued Member of Parliament for Iskandar Puteri and Democratic Action Party adviser Lim Kit Siang regarding an article entitled "Dangerous fallacy to think Malaysia’s on the road to integrity" that Lim had published on May 6, 2019. Apandi claimed that the article had libelled him by saying that he was involved in crime and had abetted in the 1MDB scandal, was a person with no morals and integrity, was unethical and had abused his power when he was the Attorney General.

On 23 May 2022, Judge Azimah Omar of the High Court dismissed Apandi's suit and ordered Apandi to pay RM80,000 in costs to Lim. Judge Azimah said that Lim had succeeded in his defence of fair comment and qualified privilege. “Indeed, the plaintiff’s action and inaction seemed to have assisted 1MDB and those (purportedly) involved. ... The defendant (Lim) had concrete evidence to justify his statement, and the evidence gave reasonable grounds to investigate the plaintiff for cover-ups in 1MDB".

In grounds of decision totalling 100 pages, Judge Azimah Omar remarked that Apandi seemed disinterested and at times self contradictory when testifying in the suit against Lim Kit Siang. Apandi subsequently appealed the verdict.

== Election results ==
Parliament of Malaysia
| Year | Constituency | Candidate | Votes | Pct | Opponent(s) | Votes | Pct | Ballots cast | Majority | Turnout |
|---|---|---|---|---|---|---|---|---|---|---|
| 1990 | P018 Pengkalan Chepa | Mohamed Apandi Ali (UMNO) | 9,874 | 26.55% | Nik Abdullah Arshad (PAS) | 27,321 | 73.45% | 37,901 | 17,447 | 75.96% |

== Honours ==
- Malaysia
  - Commander of the Order of the Defender of the Realm (PMN) – Tan Sri (2016)
  - Commander of the Order of Loyalty to the Crown of Malaysia (PSM) – Tan Sri (2014)
- Kelantan
  - Knight Grand Commander of the Order of Loyalty to the Crown of Kelantan (SPSK) – Dato' (2013)
  - Knight Commander of the Order of the Crown of Kelantan (DPMK) – Dato' (2011)
- Malacca
  - Grand Commander of the Exalted Order of Malacca (DGSM) – Datuk Seri (2016)
- Pahang
  - Knight Grand Companion of the Order of Sultan Ahmad Shah of Pahang (SSAP) – Dato' Sri (2010)
  - Knight Grand Companion of the Order of the Crown of Pahang (SIMP) – formerly Dato', now Dato' Indera (2005)
  - Knight Companion of the Order of Sultan Ahmad Shah of Pahang (DSAP) – Dato' (2004)

== See also ==
- 1Malaysia Development Berhad scandal
