= Man on the Run (2023 film) =

2023 documentary film

- Directed by: Cassius Michael Kim
- Written by: Cassius Michael Kim
- Produced by: Alyse Shorland; Rhana Natour; Fabian W. Joseph
- Cinematography: Joe Simon
- Edited by: Jon Connor; Karl Dawson
- Music by: Jordan Asher Cruz
- Production companies: The Smoking Section; Evergreen Media
- Distributed by: Netflix
- Release dates: September 8, 2023 (UK); September 22, 2023 (U.S.)
- Running time: 98 minutes
- Country: United States
- Language: English

Man on the Run is a 2023 documentary film directed, written and executively produced by Cassius Michael Kim. The film revolves on the ongoing 1Malaysia Development Berhad scandal and the involvement of former sixth Prime Minister of Malaysia Najib Razak and the fugitive businessman Jho Low in a scandal that shook Malaysia. The film was released on 19 October 2023 in Malaysia.

== Production ==
The film was directed by Cassius Michael Kim. According to Kim, he was impressed to directed Man On The Run after he followed the widespread coverage of the 1MDB scandal. The film follows the progression of the scandal from the establishment of 1MDB, Jho Low's alleged use of funds, the journalists and politicians who sought to investigate the scandal, the 2018 general election and Najib's subsequent arrest and trial.

Former sixth Malaysian Prime Minister, Najib Razak was interviewed in the film. Aside from Najib, also interviewed are Clare Rewcastle Brown, Ho Kay Tat (CEO of The Edge) and Bradley Hope (author of Billion Dollar Whale), Xavier Andre Justo (informant), Anwar Ibrahim (10th prime minister), Syed Saddiq Syed Abdul Rahman (Muar Member of Parliament), Tony Pua (former Member of Parliament) and Tommy Thomas (former Attorney General of Malaysia). However, many Hollywood celebrities involved in the scandal, such as Leonardo DiCaprio, Jamie Foxx, Paris Hilton, and Kim Kardashian, denied an interview or to comment.

== Release ==
In November 2023, Netflix acquired worldwide distribution rights to the documentary.

== Reception ==
The film received 15 ratings on Rotten Tomatoes, for which 93% are positive, with an average score of 6.8 out of 10.

=== Response by Najib ===
In January 2024, Najib threatened to take legal action against Thomas and Sarawak Report editor Clare Rewcastle-Brown for their roles in the documentary, as well as to remove the documentary from airing for its "sub judicial and contemptuous" content. Fahmi Fadzil, the Communications Ministry of Malaysia has decided to let the court to decide whether to remove the documentary from the streaming platform. Cassius told Malaysiakini that no one, including Najib, has ever complained about the documentary when it was screened in Malaysia.

== See also ==
- Najib Razak controversies
