= Tranquility (yacht) =

Superyacht built in the Netherlands

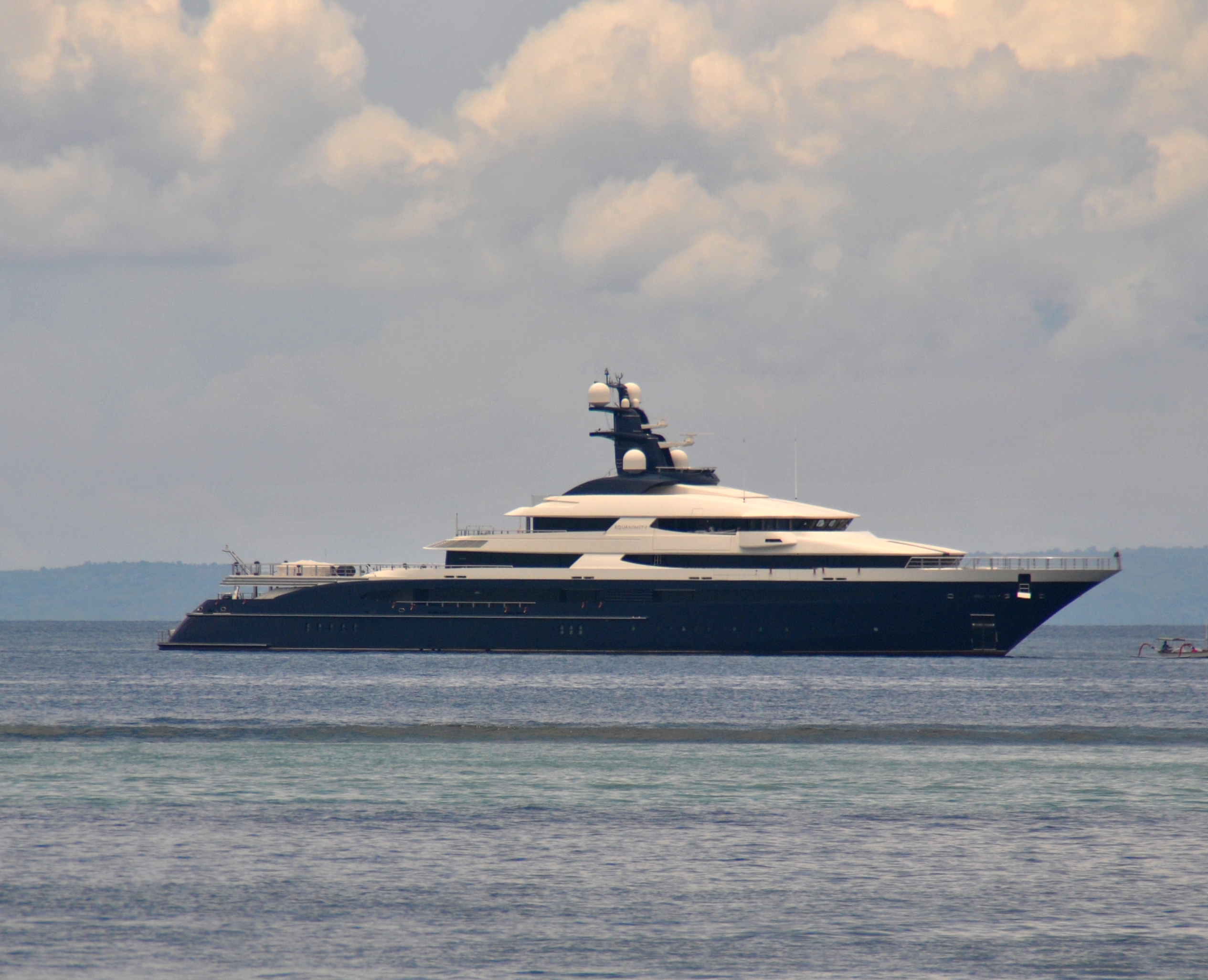
- Equanimity in 2018

History

Cayman Islands
- Name: Draak
- Owner: Gabe Newell
- Builder: Oceanco (Alblasserdam shipyard)
- Yard number: Y709
- Launched: 2013
- In service: 2014
- Refit: 2026 (Zwijnenburg shipyard)
- Identification: IMO number: 1012086; MMSI number: 319059800; Callsign: ZGDQ

General characteristics (current)
- Class & type: Yacht support/research vessel
- Tonnage: 2,951 gross tons
- Length: 92.8 m (304 ft)
- Beam: 14.50 m (47.6 ft)
- Draught: 4.09 m (13.4 ft)
- Propulsion: Twin 4,828 hp (3,600 kW) MTU 20V 4000 M73L diesel engines
- Speed: 18 knots (33 km/h) (max)
- Range: 5,000 nautical miles (9,300 km) at 14 knots (26 km/h)
- Capacity: 18 guests
- Crew: 31

Draak, previously known as Tranquility and Equanimity, is a 92.80 m (304.5 ft) superyacht launched at the Oceanco yard in Alblasserdam, with Oceanco responsible for the exterior design, while Winch Design worked on the interior. The yacht was allegedly purchased by Malaysian financier Jho Low using money stolen from the Malaysian sovereign wealth fund 1MDB. It was seized by the Indonesian authorities in 2018, judicially sold to the Genting Group in early 2019, and renamed Tranquility. It was then sold to Gabe Newell in September 2023, and renamed Draak.

== Design ==
The original length of the yacht was 91.50 m (300.2 ft). The beam is 14.50 m (47.6 ft) and the draught of Draak is 4 m (13 ft). The steel hull is strengthened to Ice Class E, with the superstructure made out of aluminium with teak laid decks. The yacht is built to RINA classification society rules, issued by Cayman Islands.

Draak was the first yacht designed and built to comply with the Passenger Yacht Code (PYC).

The former ship facilities included a sauna, two helicopter landing pads, swimming pool, gym, spa, movie theatre and an on-deck Jacuzzi. The tender garage houses two 10.5 metre tenders, that can carry up to 12 guests and two crew each. She is well equipped for adventure with a range of water toys including Jet Skis, Wave Runners, SeaBobs and an electric surfboard.

Since her rebuilt, finished in 2026 at Oceanco's Zwijndrecht yard, the ship has been outfitted as a support and research vessel. The yacht now features a fully equipped dive center with a decompression chamber replacing the beach club and spa, while the main deck saloon was converted into a large crew mess. Further modifications were added to the interior layout with the former guest and leisure areas adapted into new crew and specialist personnel cabins.

On the exterior, the ship's boarding platform located at the stern was extended to accommodate retractable fenders and swim stairs, increasing the length of the vessel to 92.8 m (304 ft). The former helideck on the upper aft area was modified to integrate a large tender deck equipped with a heavy lift crane.

== Engines ==
Power is delivered by twin 4,828 hp (3,600 kW) MTU 20V 4000 M73L diesel engines with 271,000 L (72,000 US gal) fuel tanks.

== Seizure and judgement ==
In March 2018, it was reported that Indonesian authorities seized Equanimity in February. The US Department of Justice has been working on this case in relation to the 1MDB scandal since 2016 and has named Jho Low, the alleged owner of Equanimity, as a key figure in the US lawsuit. They believe funds used for the acquisition of the yacht were transferred from the Malaysian sovereign wealth fund 1MDB between 2009 and 2015.

In late April 2018, it was reported that Equanimity was released to its owner after an Indonesian court declared that the seizure of the yacht was invalid. However, Indonesian police seized the yacht again three months later after a request for legal assistance from the United States.

In August 2018, Equanimity was brought back to Malaysia from Indonesia and seized under Malaysian law following the activation of Mutual Legal Assistance Treaties between Indonesia, the United States and Malaysia. However, in a statement through his legal team, Low accused Prime Minister Dr Mahathir Mohamad of violating the "rule of law" for seizing the yacht.

On 19 October 2018, the High Court in Kuala Lumpur declared that the Equanimity belongs to two 1MDB subsidiaries, namely, 1MDB Energy Holdings Limited and 1MDB Global Investment Limited, after its registered owner Equanimity (Cayman) Ltd failed to appear in court to claim the superyacht.

The luxury superyacht was docked at the Boustead Cruise Centre terminal in Pulau Indah, Port Klang. It reportedly cost the government RM3 million to maintain the yacht every month.

== Auction ==
On 29 October 2018, Malaysia started an auction of the Equanimity through the yacht brokerage firm Burgess, which was appointed by the High Court of Malaya to assist with the sale of the superyacht.

On 3 April 2019, Malaysia's Attorney-General Tommy Thomas said the Admiralty Court in Kuala Lumpur had approved the offer by Genting to purchase the vessel, Equanimity, at the price of US$126 million.

== Current use ==
Since her refit, the ship is part of the fleet of vessels used by the research organization Inkfish. She is assigned as a companion yacht to the Leviathan superyacht research vessel. As of May 2026, the ship is undergoing sea trials in the Netherlands.

== See also ==
- List of motor yachts by length
- List of yachts built by Oceanco
- Luxury yacht
- Oceanco
