= Constellation (motor yacht) =

Ship built in 1999

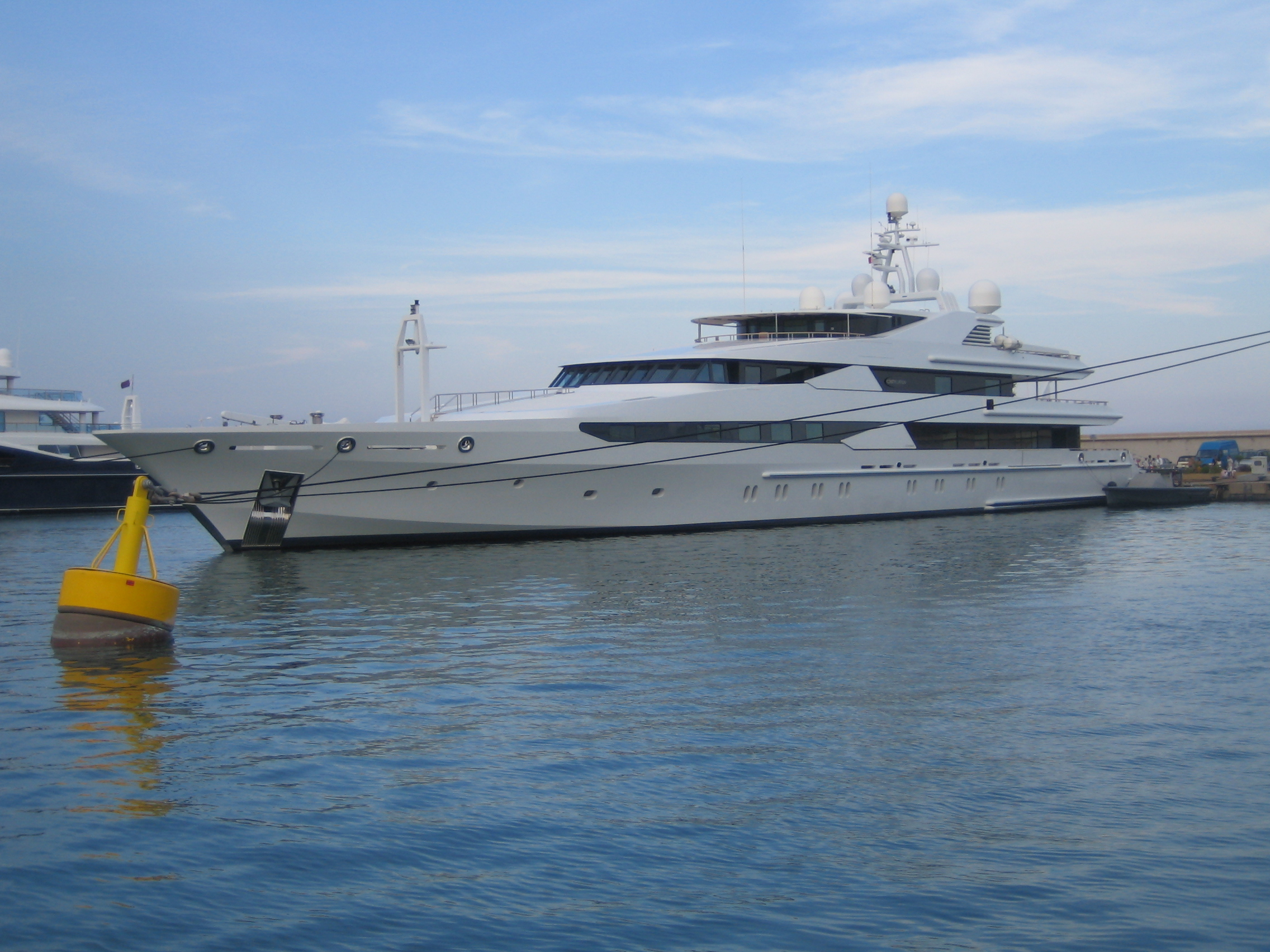

History

Qatar
- Name: Constellation
- Owner: Sheikh Hamad bin Khalifa Al Thani
- Builder: Oceanco
- Launched: 1999
- In service: 1999
- Out of service: 2019
- Identification: IMO number: 1005899; MMSI number: 466227000; Callsign: A7XH

General characteristics
- Class & type: Motor yacht
- Tonnage: 1706 gross tons
- Length: 80 m (260 ft)
- Beam: 12.98 m (42.6 ft)
- Draught: 4.21 m (13.8 ft)
- Propulsion: twin 8160.0hp MTU 20V 1163TB 73L diesel engines
- Speed: 24 knots (44 km/h) (max)
- Capacity: 19 guests
- Crew: 22

The 80 m (260 ft) superyacht Constellation was launched at the Oceanco yard in Alblasserdam. Monaco based The A Group designed the exterior of Constellation, with interior design by Fantini Design & The A Group. She has two sister ships, the 2001 built 80 m (260 ft) Stargate and the 2000 built 95 m (312 ft) Indian Empress.

== Design ==
Her length is 80 m (260 ft), beam is 12.98 m (42.6 ft) and she has a draught of 4.21 m (13.8 ft). The hull is built out of steel while the superstructure is made out of aluminium with teak laid decks. The yacht is built to ABS classification society rules, issued by Qatar.

== Engines ==
She is powered by twin 8160.0 hp MTU 20V 1163 TB73L diesel engines. With her 275,800 L (72,900 US gal) fuel tanks she has a maximum range of 5,500 nmi (10,200 km) at 12 knots (22 km/h).

== Support vessel ==
Constellation has a 56 m (184 ft) support vessel named Al Shoua. She was built as the offshore service vessel Interceptor in 1980. Shadow Marine converted the vessel into a support vessel in 2008.

== Fire ==
On the 11th of August 2019 the storage building where Constellation and two other yachts (52 m (171 ft) Maracunda & 36 m (118 ft) Al Adaid) were kept, caught fire. The building eventually collapsed and in the process severely damaging, the stored yachts. As off December 2020, only Al Adaid is back in service. It is unknown whether the other two will be repaired.

== See also ==
- List of motor yachts by length
- List of yachts built by Oceanco
- Luxury yacht
- Oceanco
