= Yasmine of the Sea =

Superyacht

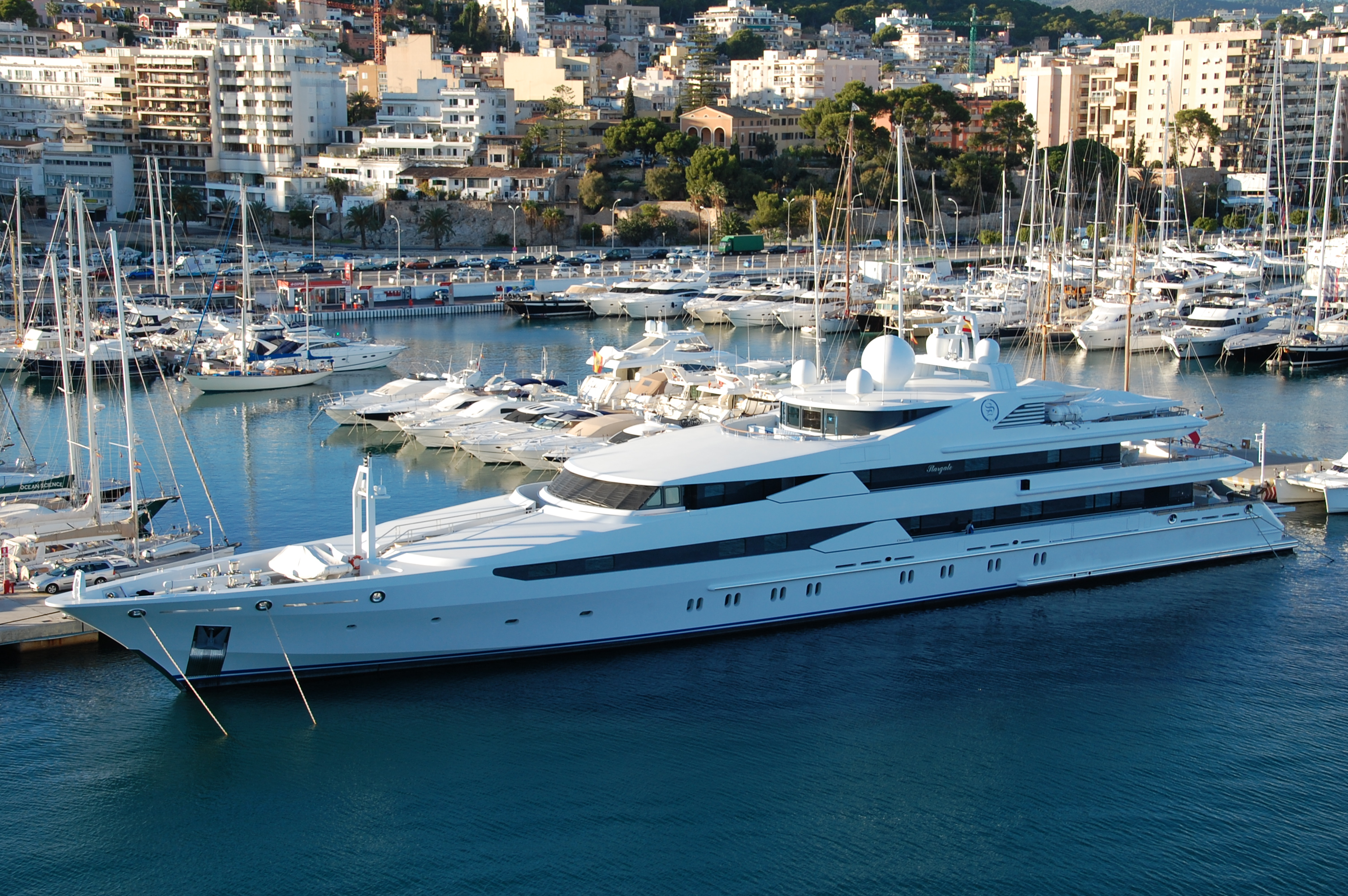

History

Bahamas
- Name: Yasmine of The Sea
- Owner: Sheikh Abdullah al Thani
- Builder: Oceanco
- Launched: 2001
- In service: 2001
- Identification: IMO number: 1005904; MMSI number: 311281000; Callsign: C6SC9

General characteristics
- Class & type: Motor yacht
- Tonnage: 1723 gross tons
- Length: 83 m (272 ft)
- Beam: 12.98 m (42.6 ft)
- Draught: 4.21 m (13.8 ft)
- Propulsion: Twin 8160.0hp MTU 20V 1163TB 73L diesel engines
- Speed: 24 knots (44 km/h) (max)
- Capacity: 19 guests
- Crew: 22

The 80 m (260 ft) superyacht Yasmine of the Sea (built as Stargate) was launched at the Oceanco yard in Alblasserdam. The Monaco-based A Group designed the exterior of Stargate, with interior design by Camillo Costantini & The A Group. She has two sister ships, the 1999-built 80 m (260 ft) Constellation and the 2000-built 95 m (312 ft) Indian Empress.

== Design ==
Her length is 83 m (272 ft), beam is 12.98 m (42.6 ft) and she has a draught of 4.21 m (13.8 ft). The hull is built out of steel while the superstructure is made out of aluminium with teak laid decks. The yacht is Lloyd's registered, issued by Bahamas.

== Engines ==
She is powered by twin 8160.0 hp MTU 20V 1163 TB73L diesel engines. With her 275,800 L (72,900 US gal) fuel tanks she has a maximum range of 5,500 nmi (10,200 km) at 12 knots (22 km/h).

== See also ==
- List of motor yachts by length
- List of yachts built by Oceanco
- Luxury yacht
- Oceanco
