= Leviathan (yacht) =

2025 superyacht by Oceanco

- Leviathan on her first sea trial in 2025

History

Cayman Islands
- Owner: Gabe Newell
- Builder: Oceanco, Netherlands
- Yard number: Y722
- Laid down: 2021
- Completed: August 10, 2025
- Identification: IMO number: 9921491; MMSI number: 319324100; Callsign:ZGUZ3

General characteristics
- Class & type: Motor yacht
- Displacement: 4,970 GT
- Length: 364 ft (111 m)
- Beam: 58 ft (18 m)
- Draft: 15.1 ft (4.6 m)
- Propulsion: 2 ABB DO980P Azipods with access to 5.5 megawatt hour battery system
- Speed: 17.6 knots (33 km/h) maximum, 13 knots (24 km/h) cruising
- Range: 6,500 nm
- Capacity: 22 guests
- Crew: 33
- Notes: Submarine garage

Leviathan is a superyacht launched by Oceanco in 2025. Its owner, Gabe Newell, the owner of the video game company Valve, participated in its development.

== Design and construction ==
Gabe Newell, the owner of the video game company Valve, participated in Leviathan's development. Interested in marine life and its exploration through his Inkfish organization, Newell conceived Leviathan as part of his Kraken Fleet, exhibiting practicality and functionality, and fostering crew camaraderie. Newell also owns another yacht, Draak (ex Tranquility), that serves as a support vessel to the Leviathan. It is registered in the Cayman Islands.

The naval architecture was designed by Lateral Naval Architects and Oceanco, the exterior by Oceanco, and the interiors by Mark Berryman Designs. About 2,000 people were involved in the building of the ship.

The vessel has a steel hull with an aluminum superstructure. Its dimensions are: length 364 feet (111 m), beam 58 feet (18 m), and draft 15.1 feet (4.6 m), with a weight of 4,970 GT.

The vessel is unusual as it includes a submarine garage, a dive center, a scientific laboratory, an onboard hospital, and a 3D print shop. In addition, there is a beach club with spa, a basketball court, and a gaming lounge. The vessel is handled by a crew of 33, and has 11 cabins for 22 guests, including one master bedroom and four VIP cabins. The communal mess hall allows guests and crew to sit together. For easier maintenance, a special exterior paint was chosen, durable interior materials used, and no teak decking applied.

Leviathan has a diesel-electric propulsion system (two ABB DO980P Azipods with access to a 5.5 megawatt-hour battery system allowing prolonged silent, emission-free operation. The cruising speed is 13 knots and the maximum speed 17.6 knots. Its range is 6,500 nm. It has a wastewater treatment system and a waste heat recovery system. The cost of the vessel was about $500 million.

== History ==
During the construction of the vessel, Newell bought the shipyard from Mohammed Al Barwani.

== See also ==
- List of motor yachts by length
- List of yachts built by Oceanco
- Luxury yacht
- Oceanco
