= Luna B =

Yacht, manufactured in 2005 by Oceanco

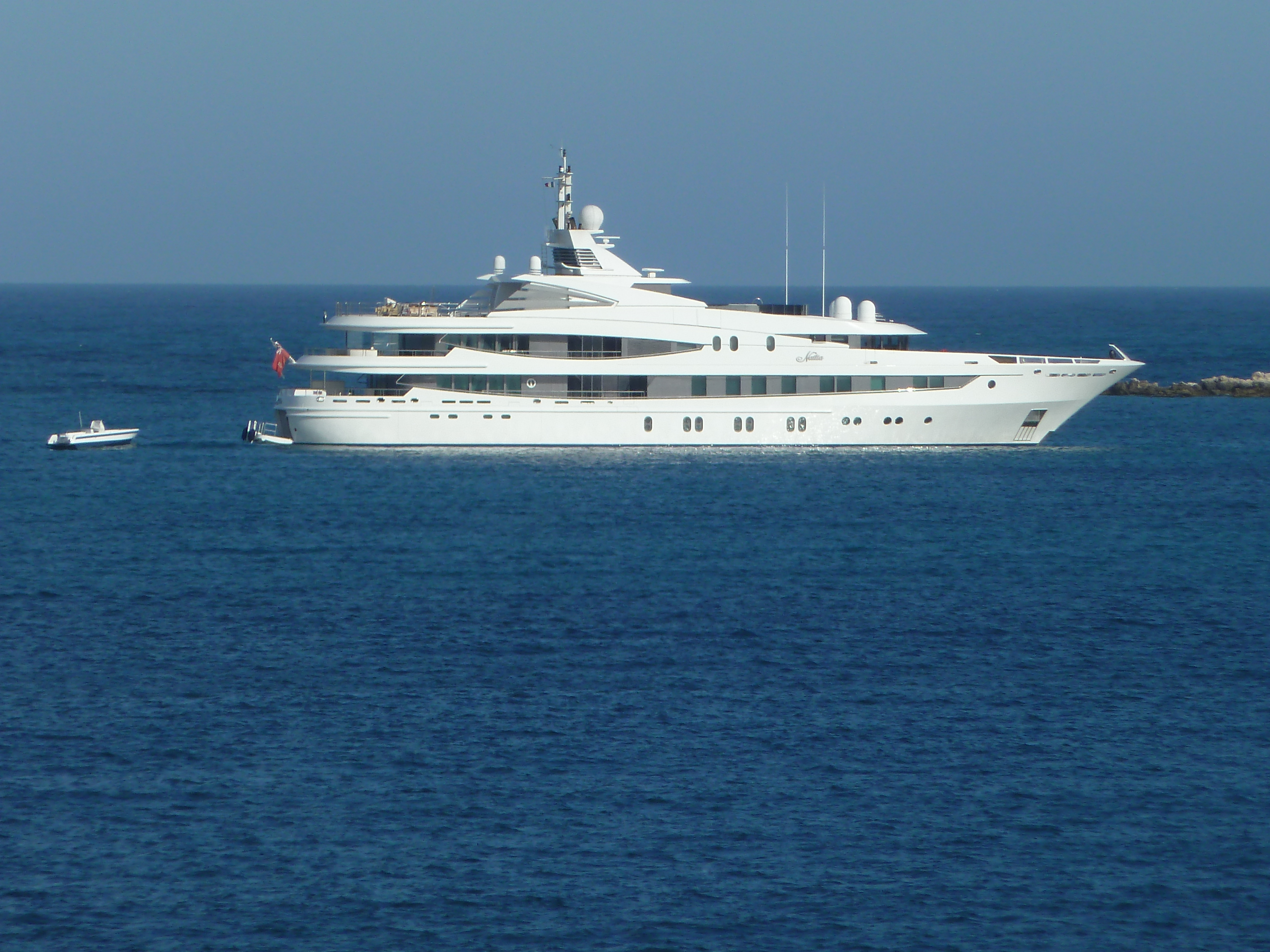

History

Cayman Islands
- Name: Luna B
- Owner: Robert Friedland
- Builder: Oceanco
- Yard number: Y661
- Launched: 2005
- Identification: IMO number: 1008279; MMSI number: 319398000; Callsign: ZCOD5
- Status: For Sale

General characteristics
- Class & type: Motor yacht
- Tonnage: 1,801 GT
- Displacement: 1,554 metric tons (1,529 long tons) full load
- Length: 66 m (217 ft)
- Beam: 11.90 m (39.0 ft)
- Draught: 4.05 m (13.3 ft)
- Propulsion: 2x 3,015hp Deutz AG (SBV 12M 628) diesel engines
- Speed: 16.5 knots (31 km/h) (maximum); 13 knots (24 km/h) (cruising)
- Range: 6,000 nmi (11,000 km) at 13 knots (24 km/h)
- Capacity: 16 passengers
- Crew: 19

The 66 m (217 ft) superyacht Luna B was launched by Oceanco at their yard in Alblasserdam. The yacht's exterior design was done by the yard itself and Alberto Pinto was responsible for the interior design. She is owned by American/Canadian billionaire Robert Friedland.

== History ==
Luna B was first launched in 2005, and was named Dilbar upon delivery to her owner Alisher Usmanov. She was renamed Ona in 2008 when Usmanov took delivery of a new 110 m (360 ft) yacht built by Lürssen which he also named Dilbar.

William Kallop bought Ona in 2010 and renamed her Natita after his mother-in-law. In 2014, he took on a $32 million loan from Goldman Sachs with Natita and his other yacht, the 57 m (187 ft) Bad Girl, as collateral. Kallop stopped paying back the loan in 2016 with $28 million still left. Goldman Sachs filed a lawsuit at a federal court in Miami to have both yachts seized. US Marshals seized both vessels in August 2017 at a West Palm Beach marina. Goldman Sachs listed Natita for sale with a $39,9 million asking price. In October 2017 it was announced they had sold the yacht for $27,5 million.

The new owner was revealed to be Robert Friedland, who put Luna B up for sale once more in 2022 with a $47,5 million asking price.

== Design ==
Her length is 66 m (217 ft), beam is 11.90 m (39.0 ft) and she has a draught of 4.05 m (13.3 ft). The hull is built out of steel while the superstructure is made out of aluminium with teak laid decks. The yacht is classed by Lloyd's Register and flagged in the Cayman Islands.

=== Performance ===
Propulsion is supplied by twin 3,015 hp Deutz AG (SBV 12M 628) diesel engines. The engines drive two propellers, which in turn propel the ship to a top speed of 16.5 knots (31 km/h). At a cruising speed of 13 knots (24 km/h), her maximum range is 6,000 nmi (11,000 km).

== Amenities ==
Zero speed stabilizers, gym, swimming pool, movie theatre, tender garage, swimming platform, air conditioning, beach club, spa room. There is also a helicopter landing pad on the top deck.

=== Tenders ===
- One 8.30 m (27.2 ft) Royal Denship open sports tender
- One 9.70 m (31.8 ft) Royal Denship limo tender
- One 5.50 m (18.0 ft) Nautica Jet RIB

=== Recreational toys ===
2x Yamaha FX1200 jet-skis, seabobs, water skis, wakesurf board, Paddleboard and a water slide.

== See also ==
- List of motor yachts by length
- List of yachts built by Oceanco
