= Anastasia (ship) =

Anastasia or similar, is the name of several ships and boats.

It may refer to:

- MV Anastasia, an Empire ship and tanker launched in 1942; formerly Empire Fletcher, Backhuysen, Chama; scrapped in 1959
- SPL Princess Anastasia (1986), a cruise ferry launched in 1986; formerly Olympia, Pride of Bilbao, Bilbao
- Lady Anastasia, formerly Aria, a superyacht launched in 2001
- Anastasia (yacht), now Wheels, a superyacht launched in 2008
