= Infinity (2022 yacht) =

Motor yacht built by Oceanco

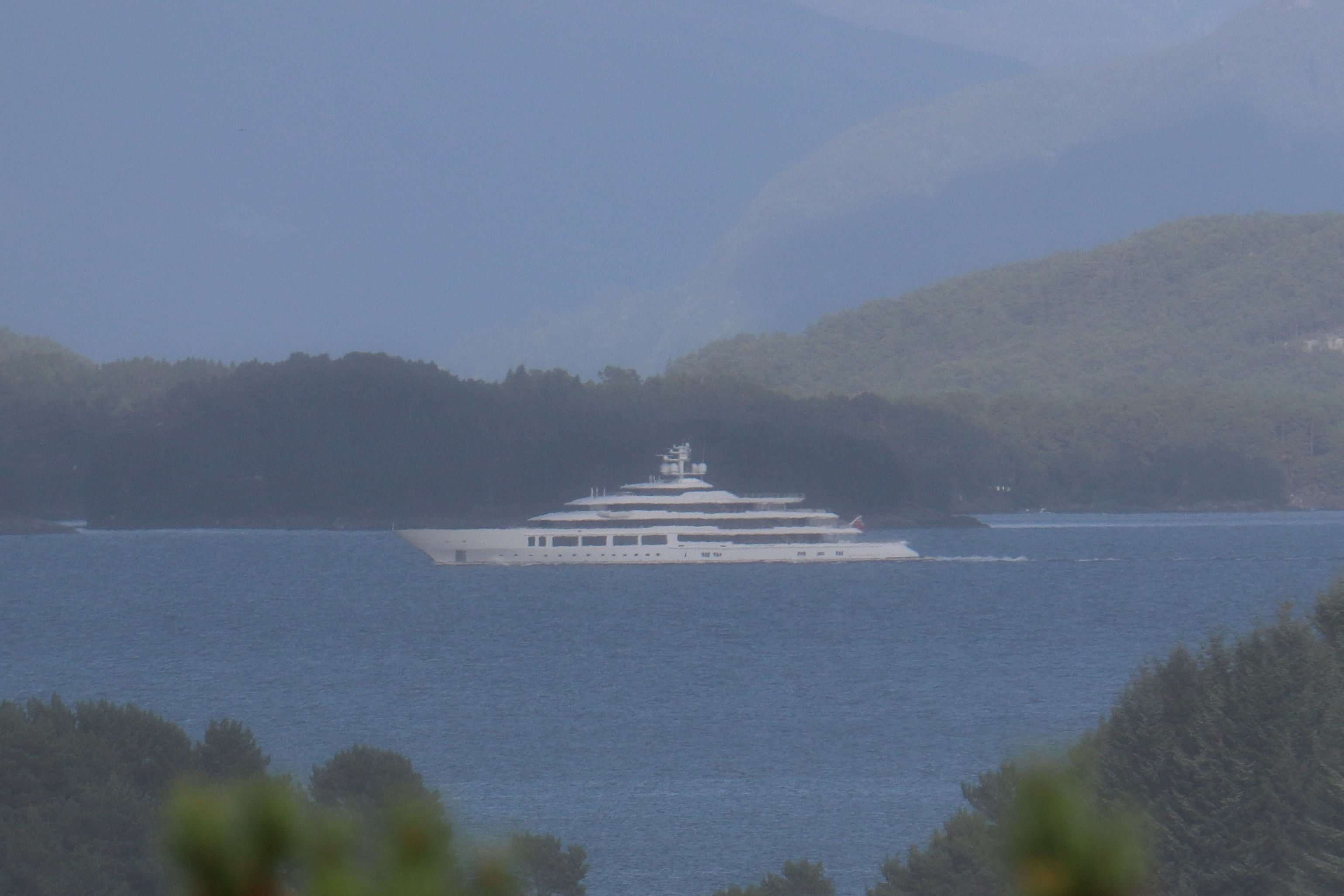

History

Cayman Islands
- Name: Infinity
- Owner: Eric Smidt
- Builder: Oceanco
- Yard number: Y719
- Launched: 2021
- Completed: 2022
- Notes: IMO number: 9817896; MMSI number: 319208000; Call sign: ZGKZ3

General characteristics
- Class & type: Lloyd's Register
- Type: Super yacht
- Tonnage: 4,978 GT
- Length: 117 m (384 ft)
- Beam: 16.1 m (53 ft)
- Speed: 18.5 knots (34 km/h) (maximum)
- Capacity: 16 passengers

Oceanco's 117 m (384 ft) Infinity was delivered in 2022 as a replacement for its previous yacht, now named Cloud 9. Her exterior design is the work of Espen Øino and her interior is by Sinot Exclusive Yacht Design and David Kleinberg Design Associates. She is capable of reaching speeds up to 18.5 knots (34 km/h).

== Specifications ==
- Length Overall: 117 m (384 ft)
- Beam Overall: 16.1 m (53 ft)
- Delivered: 2022
- Classification: Lloyd's Register
- Maximum speed: 18.5 knots (34 km/h)
- Material: Steel hull & Aluminium superstructure
- Naval architect: Lateral Naval Architects
- Exterior designer: Espen Øino
- Interior designer: Sinot Exclusive Yacht Design and David Kleinberg Design Associates

== See also ==
- Motor yacht
- List of motor yachts by length
- List of yachts built by Oceanco
- Oceanco
