= Lumen (superyacht) =

Type of ship

- Nation: Holland
- Class: Holland
- Designer(s): Adriel Rollins
- Builder: Oceanco

Specifications
- Type: Lloyd's of London ✠ 100 A1 Passenger Ship ✠ LMC UMS SCM EP
- Length: 90 m
- Beam: 14.6 m
- Draft: 4 m
- Crew: 15

Notes
- Styling: Adriel Design; Naval architect: Oceanco/Azure Naval Architects;

Oceanco’s Project Lumen is a 92-meter (302ft) superyacht project developed by the American designer Adriel Rollins. It is a Passenger Yacht Code vessel with accommodation for up to 36 people. As the name suggests, the defining feature of the yacht is ‘light.’ The coating by Jean Boulle Luxury increases the refraction of light from the Adriel Rollins, making for a shimmering, luminescent effect.

The Lumen scale model painted in the coating was on display at the Oceanco stand at the 2017 Fort Lauderdale International Boat Show.
