= MB Holding =

Omani conglomerate

MB Holding Company LLC
- Company type: Limited liability company
- Industry: Oil and gas; Engineering; Mining
- Founded: 1982; 44 years ago
- Founder: Mohammed Al Barwani
- Headquarters: Muttrah, Muscat, Oman
- Key people: Mohammed Al Barwani (Chairman); Usama Al Barwani (CEO)
- Owner: Mohammed Al Barwani
- Subsidiaries: MB Petroleum Services LLC; Petrogas E&P LLC; Mawarid Mining LLC; United Engineering Services LLC; Musstir LLC; National Takaful Company (Watania) PJSC (51%)
- Website: www.mbholdingco.com

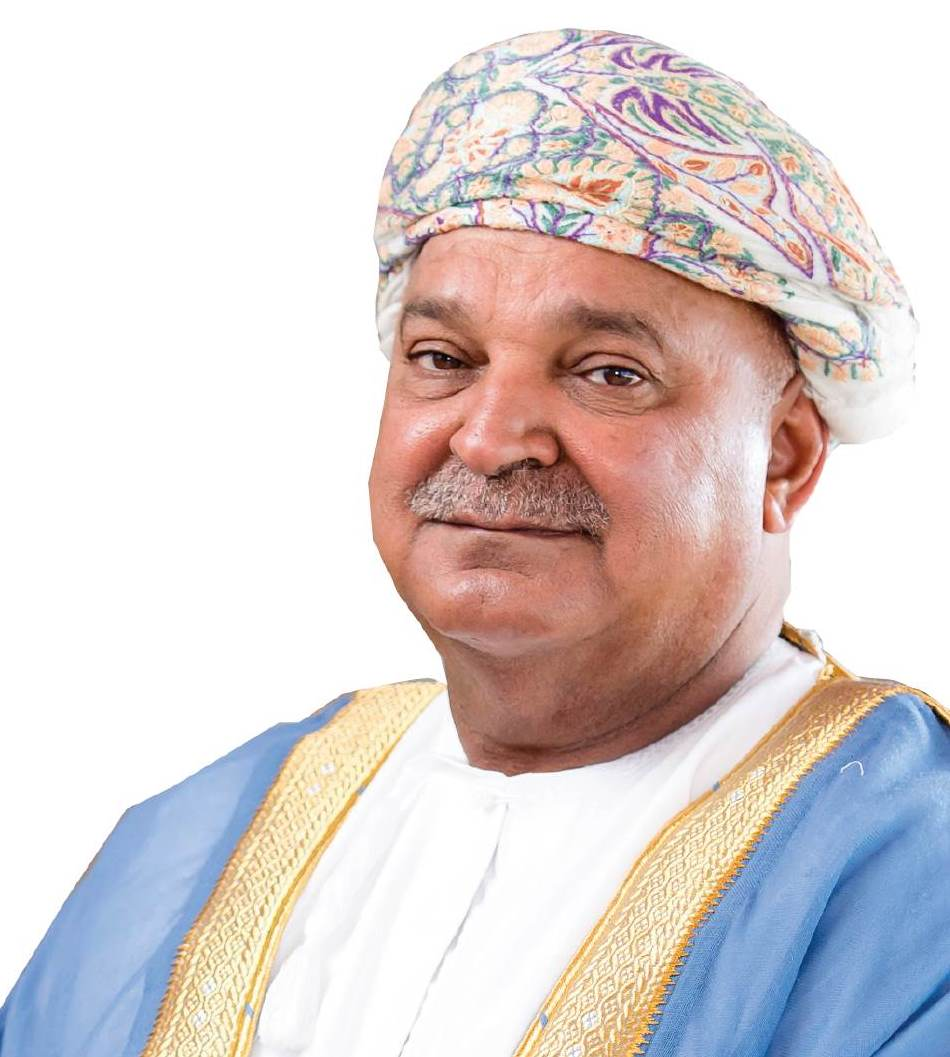

MB Holding Company LLC or Mohammed al Barwani LLC (MB LLC) is an Omani conglomerate with interests in oil and gas exploration and production, oilfield services, engineering and mining.

The company was founded in 1982 by Mohammed Al Barwani as an oilfield service provider to oil producers such as Petroleum Development Oman and Occidental Petroleum. It subsequently expanded into exploration and production and gained concessions in Oman, Egypt and Mozambique.

MB's engineering arm is involved in the aerospace and defense industry. Its mining subsidiary, Mawarid Mining, was set up in 2000 and is the largest private mining company in Oman. Mawarid is the first private mining company to engage in copper and gold exploration in Oman.

Musstir, the property development arm, specialises in the development of hotels. MB acquired Oceanco, a luxury yacht builder based in the Netherlands, in 2010.

Its other investments include Nautilus Minerals (28 percent), an underwater mineral exploration company based in Canada, Al Madina Takaful (26 percent), an Omani takaful operator, and Watania (51 percent), a takaful operator based in Abu Dhabi.

Al Barwani is chairman of the MB Group while his sons head the mining and oil and gas E&P arms.

== Operations ==
MB Holding's key business segments and operating subsidiaries are as follows:

- Oilfield services: MB Petroleum Services
- Oil and gas exploration and production: Petrogas E&P
- Mining: Mawarid Mining
- Engineering: United Engineering Services
