= Dar (yacht) =

2018 Ducth yacht

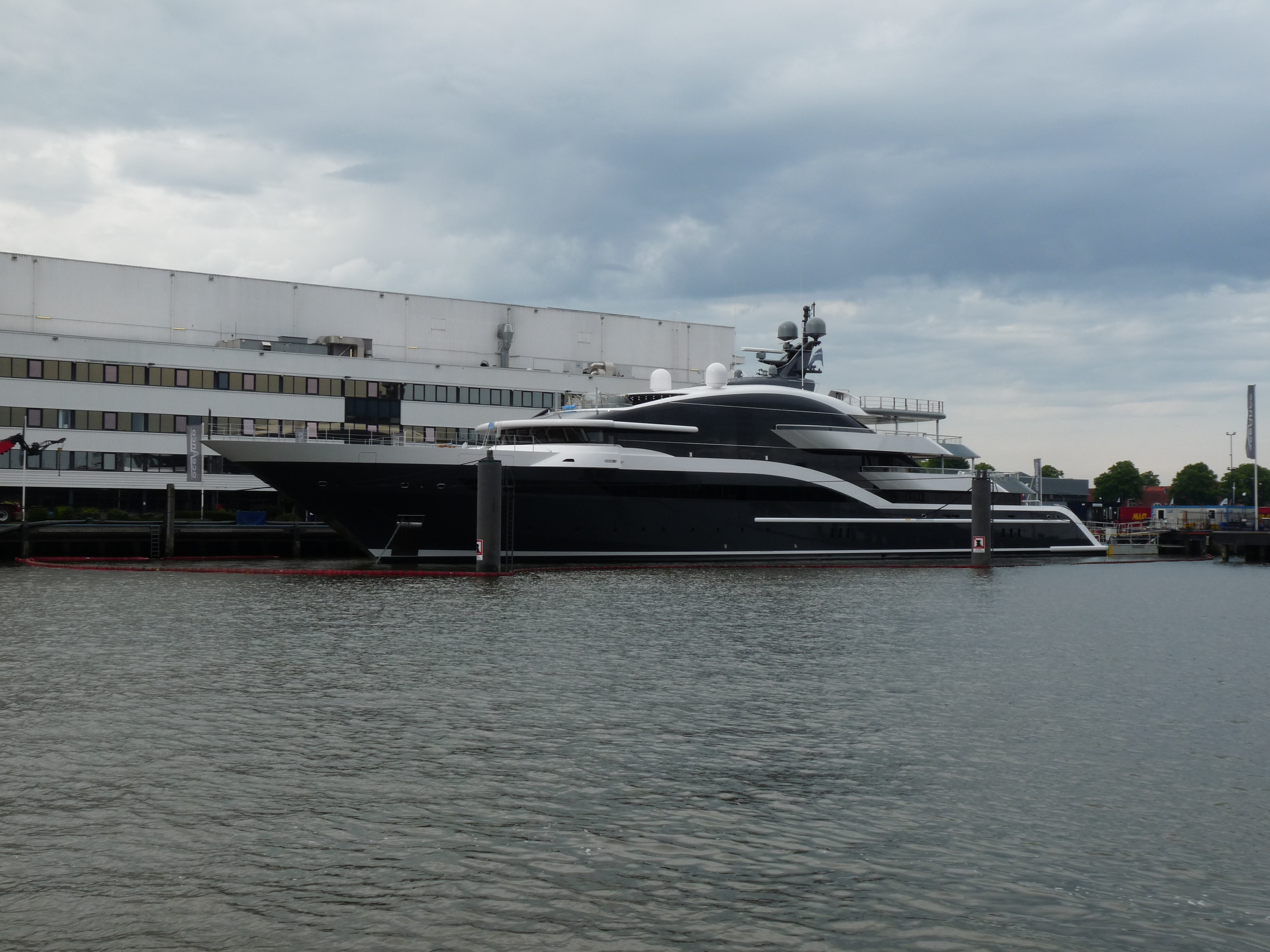

History

Cayman Islands
- Name: Dar
- Owner: Ziyad Manasir
- Builder: Oceanco
- Yard number: Y717
- Launched: 2018
- In service: 2018
- Identification: IMO number: 1013066; MMSI number: 319133300; Callsign: ZGHL5

General characteristics
- Class & type: Motor yacht
- Tonnage: 2,926 gross tons
- Length: 90.13 m (295.7 ft)
- Beam: 14.20 m (46.6 ft)
- Draught: 3.95 m (13.0 ft)
- Propulsion: Twin MTU 20V4000 M73L; 2 × 4,828 hp (3,600 kW)
- Capacity: 12 passengers

Dar is a super-yacht built in 2018 at the Dutch shipyard Oceanco. The interior design of Dar was done by Italian studio Nuvolari Lenard and the exterior work was done by Miami-based designer Luiz DeBasto. She is powered by twin 4,828 hp MTU 20V4000 M73L engines.

== Design ==
The length of the yacht is 90.13 m (295.7 ft) and the beam is 14.20 m (46.6 ft). The draught of Dar is 3.95 m (13.0 ft). The materials of the hull is steel, while the superstructure is made out of aluminium with teak laid decks. The yacht is classed by Lloyd's Register and registered in the Cayman Islands.

== See also ==
- Motor yacht
- List of motor yachts by length
- List of yachts built by Oceanco
- Oceanco
