= Ziyad Manasir =

Jordanian entrepreneur (born 1965)

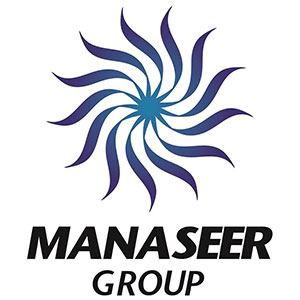
- Logo of the Manaseer group
- Born: December 12, 1965 (age 60); Amman, Jordan
- Occupations: Entrepreneur and businessman
- Known for: Jordanian billionaire

Ziyad Manasir (Arabic: زياد المناصير; born 12 December 1965, Amman, Jordan) is a Jordanian entrepreneur and businessman. He is the founder of the Jordanian conglomerate known as Manaseer Group.

== Biography ==
Manasir was born on 12 December 1965 in Amman. He attended the Azerbaijan State Oil and Industry University. When he was a student, he began purchasing and selling computers and vehicles. Soon after, he moved on to trading yellow phosphorus, wood, and oil products.

== Career ==
In 1999, Manasir founded the company Manaseer in Amman, Jordan. He started the company as a sales company of chemicals and fertilizers with a total of 15 employees. When he founded the company, the portfolio was valued at $50 million. Since then, it has grown steadily and surpassed the $3.5 billion mark. In October 2023, the Manaseer Group partnered with W Motors to become the exclusive importer of W Motors in Jordan and the surrounding countries. In the same month, Manaseer Information Technology got the rights to be the official dealer for Getac in Jordan.

Manaseer Group has grown into a diversified platform of more than 40 companies, spanning the full construction value chain; from aggregates and cement to construction chemicals, ready-mix concrete, concrete products, and steel structures. Its activities also extend to fertilizers, energy, mining, industrial solutions, and logistics and employs more than 10,000 people.

== Personal life ==
His wife is Victoria Manasir and they have five children: Diana Manasir, Helen Manasir, Alex Manasir, Roman Manasir, Dana Manasir. He resides in Sardinia, Italy. He owns the yacht Dar

== See also ==
- Manaseer Group
