= Samsara (yacht) =

Motor yacht built by Oceanco

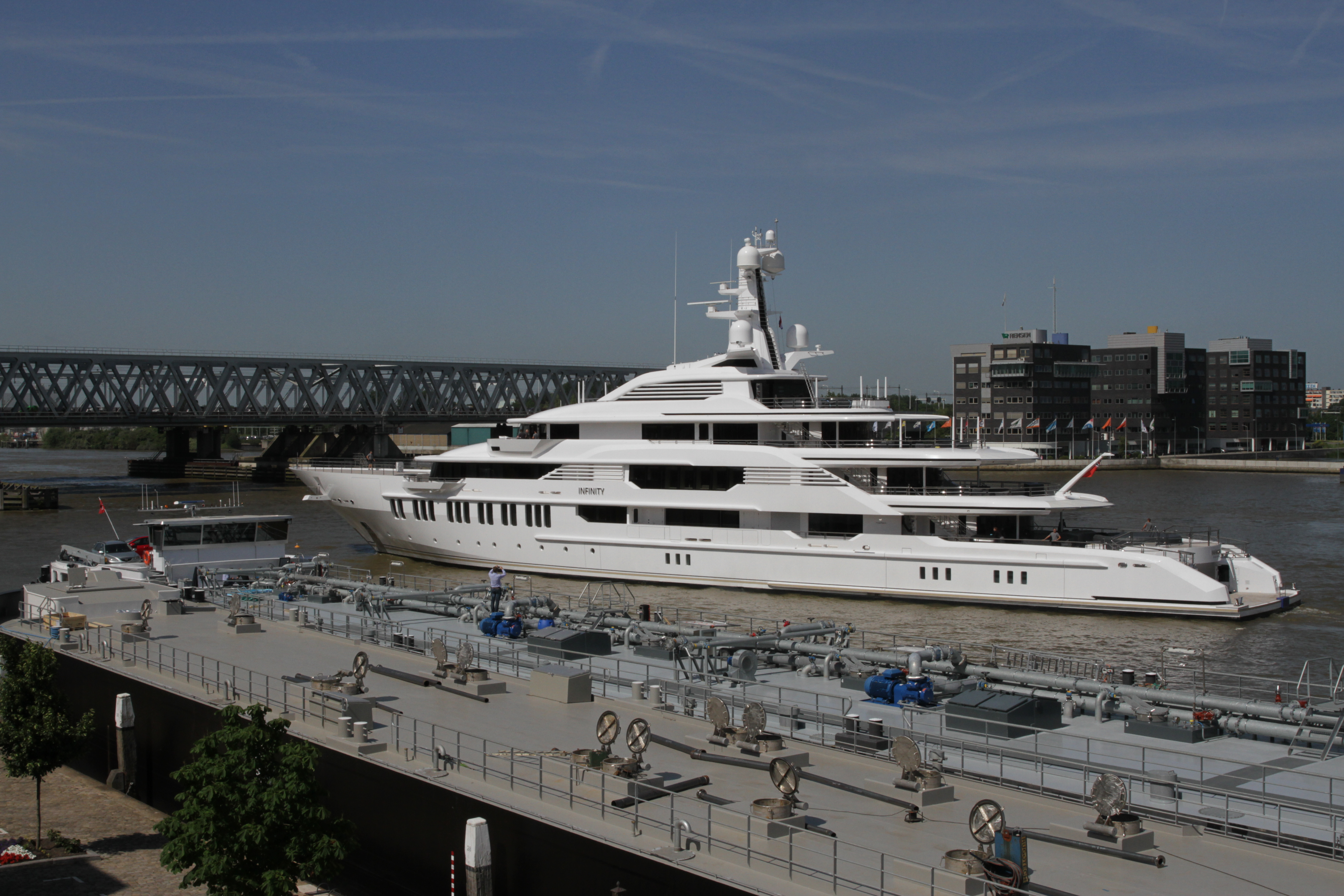
- Cloud 9

History

Cayman Islands
- Name: Infinity (2015–2022); Cloud 9 (2022–2023); Infinity (2023); Samsara (2023 onwards)
- Owner: J.K. Rowling
- Port of registry: Bloody Bay, Cayman Islands
- Builder: Oceanco
- Yard number: Y710
- Laid down: 12 January 2012
- Launched: 2014
- Completed: 3 January 2015
- Notes: IMO number: 1012177; MMSI number: 319068100; Call sign: ZGEC5

General characteristics
- Class & type: Lloyd's Register
- Type: Super yacht
- Tonnage: 2,200 GT
- Length: 88.5 m (290 ft)
- Beam: 14.2 m (47 ft)
- Draft: 4.5 m (15 ft)
- Propulsion: 2 × MTU - 20V 4000 M73L; 2 × 4,828 hp (3,600 kW)
- Speed: 18.5 knots (34 km/h) (maximum)
- Capacity: 14 passengers
- Crew: 28

Oceanco's 88.5 m (290 ft) Cloud 9 was delivered in 2015 as Infinity. Her exterior design is the work of Espen Øino and her interior is by Sinot Exclusive Yacht Design and David Kleinberg Design Associates. The Master Suite includes a private exterior deck and whirlpool. Guest accommodations consist of two VIP suites and four spacious guest staterooms. The yacht is fitted with two 4,828 hp (3,600 kW) MTU engines and is capable of reaching speeds of 18.5 knots (34 km/h).

She was sold by her first owner, Eric Smidt, to Brett Blundy, in 2022 in anticipation of the delivery of a new 117 m (384 ft) Oceanco built Infinity. Subsequently, she was sold in 2023 to J.K. Rowling, author of Harry Potter novels, who rechristened her Samsara.

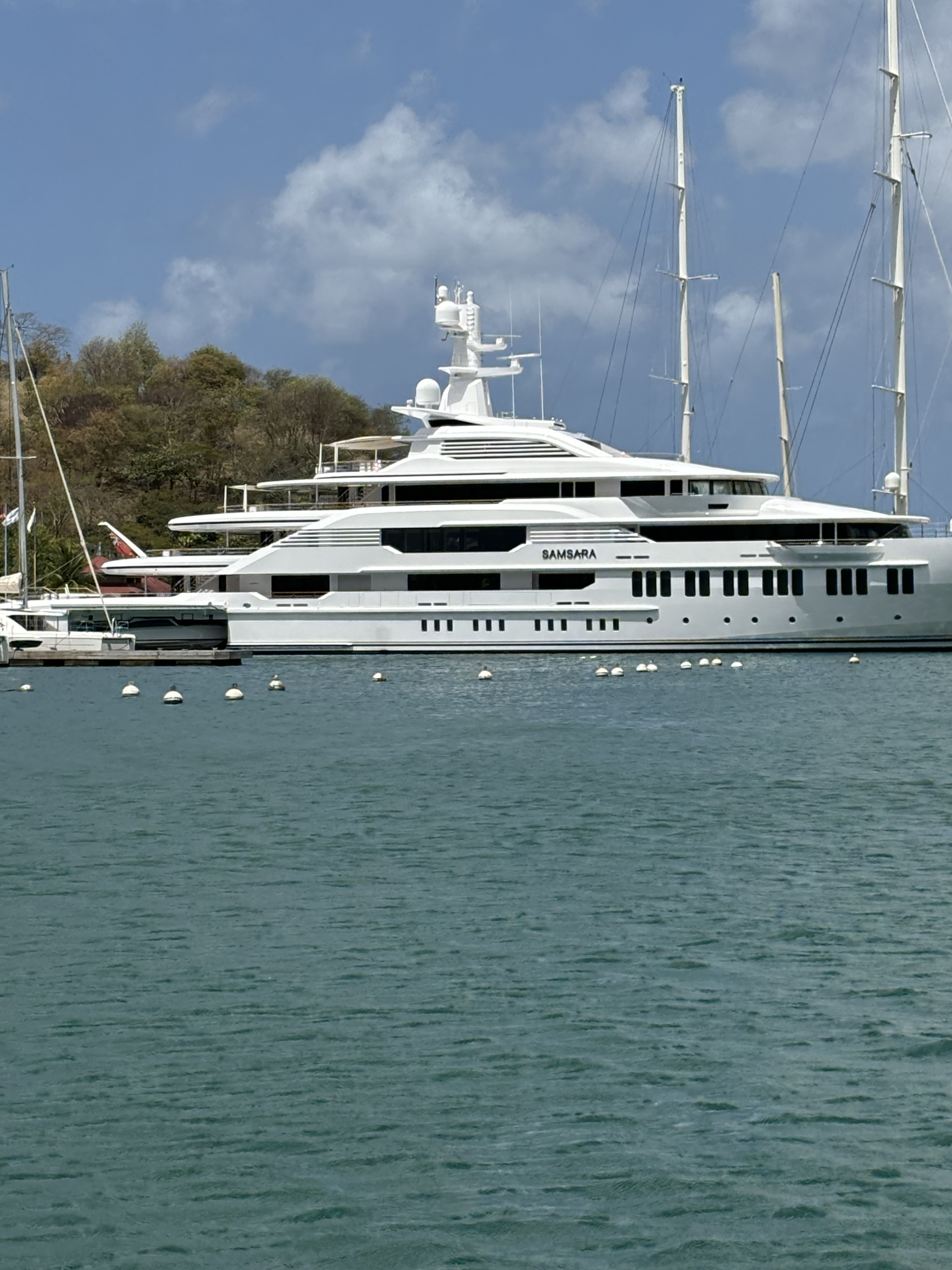
Samsara Yacht in port of St George's Grenada, March 2024

== Specifications ==
- Length Overall: 88.5 m (290 ft)
- Beam Overall: 14.2 m (47 ft)
- Delivered: 2015
- Classification: Lloyd's Register ✠ 100 A1 SSC Yacht (P) MONO G6 ✠ LMC UMS MCA
- Maximum speed: 18.5 knots (34 km/h)
- Accommodation: Master suite with private exterior deck and whirlpool, 2 VIP suites and 4 guest cabins
- Material: Steel hull and aluminium superstructure
- Engine type: 2 × MTU – 20 V 4000 M73L – 3,600 kW (4,828 hp)
- Fuel capacity: 280,000 L (74,000 US gal)
- Naval architect: Oceanco / Azure
- Exterior designer: Espen Øino
- Interior designer: Sinot Exclusive Yacht Design and David Kleinberg Design Associates

== See also ==
- Motor yacht
- List of motor yachts by length
- List of yachts built by Oceanco
- Oceanco
