= List of yachts built by Oceanco =

This is a list of all the yachts built by Oceanco, sorted by year.

Biggest yacht by both length and volume upon completion
Biggest yacht by length upon completion
Biggest yacht by volume upon completion

== Table ==
Year	Size		Name		Picture	Reference
Year	Length (LOA)	Volume	Original	Current (Note: As of 22 October 2022)	Picture	Reference
1993	56.20 m (184 ft)	646 GT	Achiever	The Wellesley		
1994	37.5 m (123 ft)	254 GT	Caprice			
1994	24.40 m (80 ft)	125 GT	Alarga B	Cymbella		
1995	49.38 m (162 ft)	475 GT	Arabian Princess	Anna J		
1996	43.70 m (143 ft)	440 GT	Ultimate	Deep Blue II		
1997	51.80 m (170 ft)	638 GT	Accolade	Lazy Z		
1998	42.37 m (139 ft)	428 GT	Aspiration	Iravati		
1999	80 m (262 ft)	1,706 GT	Constellation			
2000	95 m (312 ft)	3,176 GT	Indian Empress	H3		
2000	52.80 m (173 ft)	640 GT	Sunrise	Friendship		
2001	59.10 m (194 ft)	969 GT	Pegasus	Helios		
2001	55.63 m (183 ft)	1,036 GT	Lady Christine	Queen Mavia		
2001	80 m (262 ft)	1,737 GT	Stargate	Yasmine of the Sea		
2002	62.60 m (205 ft)	1,083 GT	Lady Lola	Lucky Lady		
2004	60 m (197 ft)	1,184 GT	Alfa Four	Sea Pearl		
2005	66 m (217 ft)	1,801 GT	Dilbar	Luna B		
2005	62 m (203 ft)	1,166 GT	Lady Christina	Sea Walk		
2007	80 m (262 ft)	2,310 GT	Amevi	Batello		
2007	82 m (269 ft)	2,500 GT	Alfa Nero			
2008	75.50 m (248 ft)	1,991 GT	Anastasia	Wheels		
2009	85.47 m (280 ft)	2,822 GT	Vibrant Curiosity			
2010	85.47 m (280 ft)	2,867 GT	Sunrays			
2010	86.01 m (282 ft)	2,658 GT	Seven Seas	Man of Steel		
2012	88.50 m (290 ft)	2,786 GT	Nirvana			
2013	85.50 m (281 ft)	2,800 GT	St. Princess Olga	Amore Vero		
2014	91.50 m (300 ft)	2,998 GT	Equanimity	Draak		
2015	88.50 m (290 ft)	2,914 GT	Infinity	Cloud 9		
2016	86 m (282 ft)	1,538 GT	Aquijo			
2017	88.50 m (290 ft)	2,984 GT	Barbara			
2017	106.70 m (350 ft)	2,864 GT	Black Pearl			
2017	110.10 m (361 ft)	4,523 GT	Jubilee	Kaos		
2018	90.13 m (296 ft)	2,926 GT	Dar			
2018	109 m (358 ft)	3,418 GT	Bravo Eugenia		Bravo Eugenia Yacht by Oceanco	
2019	90 m (295 ft)	2,946 GT	DreAMBoat			
2022	117 m (384 ft)	4,978 GT	Infinity			
2022	109 m (358 ft)	4,444 GT	Seven Seas			
2023	127 m (417 ft)	3,493 GT	Koru			
2025	111 m (364 ft)	4,970 GT	Leviathan			

== Under construction ==
Year	Length overall	Name	Reference
2027	80 m (262 ft)	Project Y729	

== Concepten ==
Length overall	Name	Reference
86 m (282 ft)	Oceanco PA 168	
120 m (394 ft)	Oceanco PA 122	
90 m (295 ft)	Project Cosmos	
115 m (377 ft)	Project Tuhura	
102 m (335 ft)	Project Balance	

== See also ==
- List of large sailing yachts
- List of motor yachts by length
- Luxury yacht
- Sailing yacht
