= Al Madina Takaful =

Shariah complaint financial organization of Oman

Al Madina Insurance Company SAOG
- Type: Public
- Traded as: MSM: AMAT; MSM 30 component
- Industry: Takaful
- Founded: 15 May 2006; 20 years ago
- Headquarters: Muscat Grand Mall; Al-Ghubra, Muscat, Oman
- Key people: H.E. Dr. Mohammed Ali Al Barwani (Chairman); Usama Al Barwani (CEO)
- Products: General takaful
- Revenue: ▲RO23.1 million (2014)
- Net income: ▼RO1.0 million (2014)
- Total assets: ▲RO46.8 million (2014)
- Total equity: ▼RO20.9 million (2014)
- Website: www.almadinatakaful.com

Al Madina Insurance Company SAOG (commonly known as Al Madina Takaful, Arabic: المدينة تكافل) is an Omani takaful company.

It was founded in 2006 as an insurance company. In 2014, the Capital Market Authority granted Al Madina a takaful license. Al Madina then converted all its insurance business to become Sharia-compliant and became the first takaful company in Oman.

After the conversion, Al Madina acquired a number of companies to expand its operations. In 2014, it invested in a 9.5 percent stake (along with its major shareholder MB Holding) in Abu Dhabi–based takaful operator Watania for AED 17.9 million.

In 2014, Al Madina had a customer base of 37,000 policyholders.
