= Sunrays (yacht) =

Super-yacht built by Oceanco in 2010

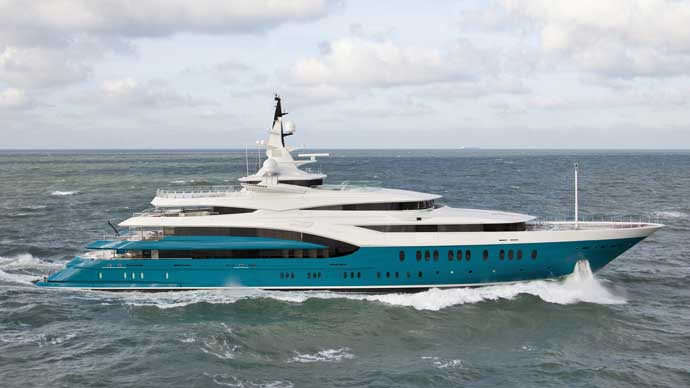

History

Cayman Islands
- Name: Sunrays
- Owner: Ravi Ruia
- Builder: Oceanco
- Yard number: Y705
- Launched: November 2009
- In service: March 2010
- Identification: IMO number: 1010351; MMSI number: 319015100; Callsign: ZGAF2

General characteristics
- Class & type: Motor yacht
- Tonnage: 2,867 gross tons
- Length: 85.50 m (280.5 ft)
- Beam: 14.20 m (46.6 ft)
- Draught: 3.95 m (13.0 ft)
- Propulsion: 2 × MTU 16V 595 TE 70; 2 × 4.680 hp (3.490 kW)
- Speed: 20 knots (37 km/h) (maximum)
- Capacity: 16 passengers

Sunrays is a super-yacht built in 2010 at the Dutch shipyard Oceanco. The interior design of Sunrays was done by Terence Disdale and the exterior work was done by Bjorn Johansson. The Sunrays yacht can accommodate up to 16 guests and has a crew of 28.

== Design ==
The length of the yacht is 85.50 m (280.5 ft) and the beam is 14.20 m (46.6 ft). The draught of Sunrays is 3.95 m (13.0 ft). The materials of the hull is steel, while the superstructure is made out of aluminium with teak laid decks. The yacht is Lloyd's registered, issued by Cayman Islands.

== Engines ==
The main engines are two MTU 16V 595 TE70 with a power of 4.680 hp (3.490 kW) each. The yacht Sunrays can reach a maximum speed of 20 knots (37 km/h).

== See also ==
- Motor yacht
- List of motor yachts by length
- List of yachts built by Oceanco
- Oceanco
