= Batello (yacht) =

Motor yacht built in 2007

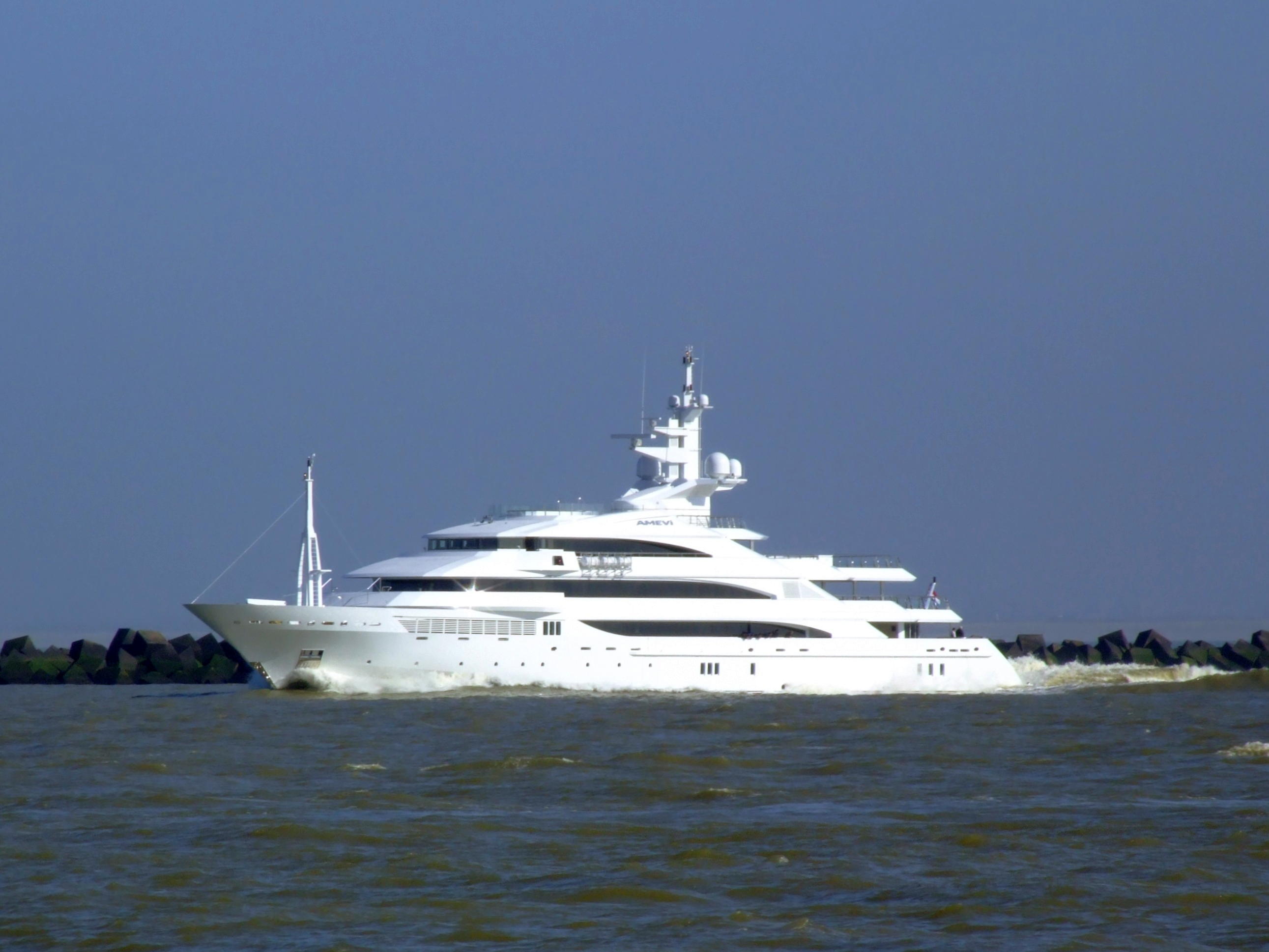
- Amevi leaving Rotterdam

History

Marshall Islands
- Name: Batello
- Builder: OceAnco
- Yard number: Y701
- Launched: 2007
- Status: Currently in service
- Notes: Call sign: ZCPY4; IMO number: 1009118; MMSI number: 538070869

General characteristics
- Class & type: Yacht
- Tonnage: 2,310 gross tons
- Length: 80.00 m (262.47 ft)
- Beam: 14.20 m (46.6 ft)
- Draft: 3.90 m (12.8 ft)
- Propulsion: MTU 16V 595 TE70 engines; 9,300 hp (6,900 kW)
- Speed: 18.5 knots (34 km/h) (maximum); 14 knots (26 km/h) (cruising)
- Capacity: 16 guests

Batello, formerly known as 'Aalto and Amevi, was the personal motor yacht of Indian steel magnate Lakshmi Mittal. Mittal ordered the yacht in 2007; it was built at Oceanco shipyard in the Netherlands. In 2024, Mittal saled the ship to an american unknown billionaire who renamed her Batello.

== Design and engine ==
It is 80.00 m (262.47 ft) long, with a moulded beam of 14.20 m (46.6 ft). The draft of Amevi is 3.90 m (12.8 ft) and its gross tonnage is 2,310. The yacht has twin MTU 16V 595 TE70 engines with a total power of 9,100 hp (6,800 kW), allowing the yacht to reach a maximum speed of 18.5 knots (34.3 km/h). Its cruising speed is around 14 knots (26 km/h).

== See also ==
- List of yachts built by Oceanco
