= Anastasia (yacht) =

Super-yacht built in 2008

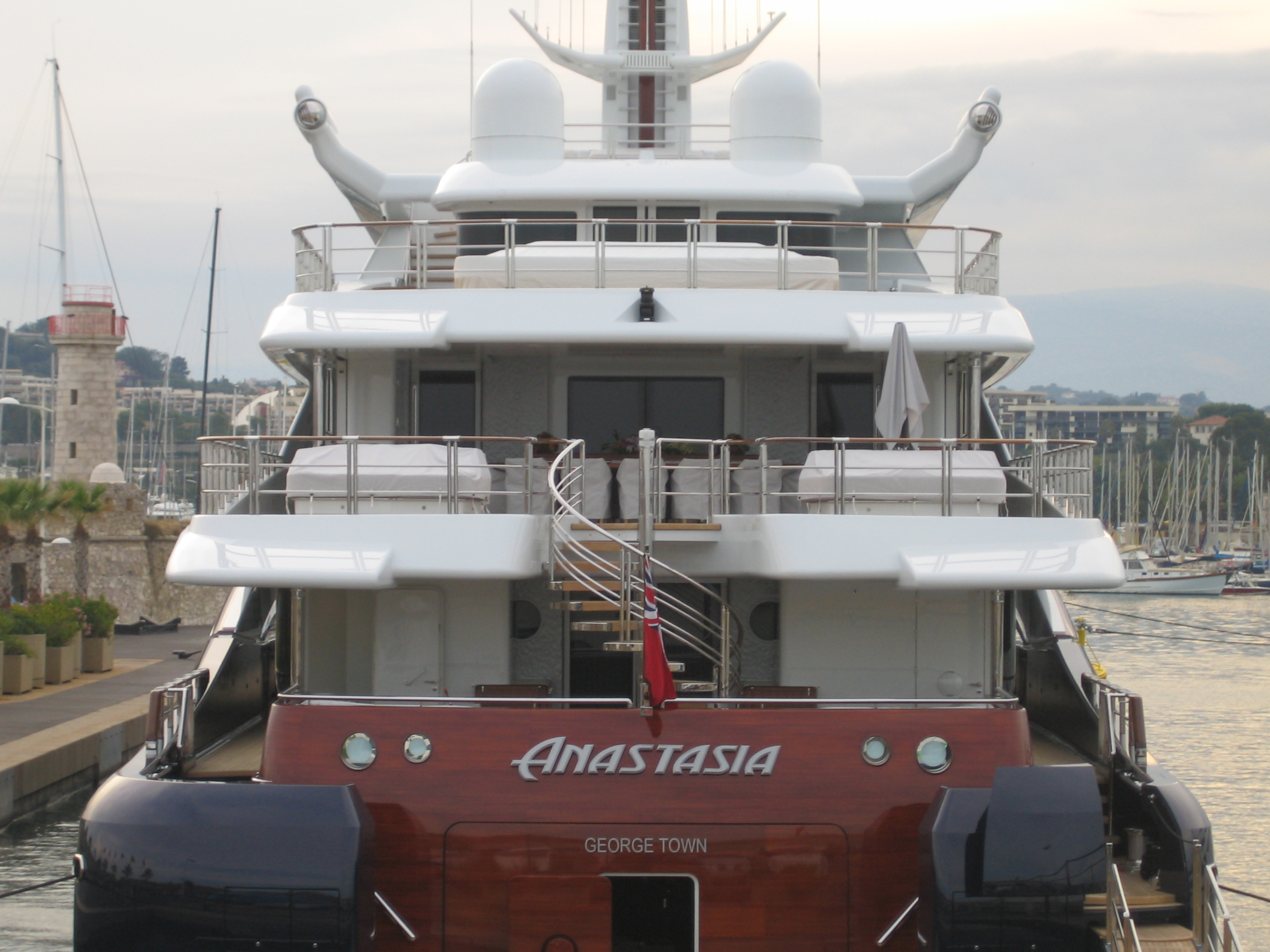
- Anastasia

History

Cayman Islands
- Name: Anastasia
- Owner: Ralf Schmid
- Builder: OceAnco
- Yard number: Y703
- Launched: 2008
- Identification: IMO number: 1009388; MMSI number: 319772000; Callsign: ZCTS7

General characteristics
- Class & type: Yacht charter
- Length: 75.50 m (247.7 ft)
- Beam: 13.40 m (44.0 ft)
- Draft: 3.80 m (12.5 ft)
- Propulsion: 2 × MTU 4000 Series V16 engines; 2 × 3,648 hp (2,720 kW)
- Speed: 18 knots (33 km/h) (maximum); 15 knots (28 km/h) (cruising)
- Capacity: 12 passengers
- Crew: 20 crew members

Anastasia is a super-yacht built in May 2008 at the shipyard Oceanco. Its exterior and interior were designed by Sam Sorgiovanni.

In 2018, the yacht was sold for €67.5 million and renamed Wheels.

== History ==
The Anastasia was built at the Oceanco shipyard in May 2008 for Vladimir Potanin.

The ship was listed for sale in July 2012 for €125 million. Annual running costs have been estimated at US$7 million.

The yacht was sold for €67.5 million to Ralf Schmid, the founder of Uniwheels, and renamed Wheels in 2018. It was available for charter, mainly in the Eastern Mediterranean, at a rate of €580,000 per week plus expenses in 2018.

== Design ==
The length of the motor yacht is 75.50 m (247.7 ft) and the beam is 13.50 m (44.3 ft). The draft of the yacht Anastasia is 3.80 m (12.5 ft). Its hull is steel, and the superstructure is aluminium with teak laid decks. The classification of the yacht according to Lloyd's Register is 100AI SSC Yacht (P) MONO G6 LMC UMS MCA Certification, issued by Cayman Islands.

== Features ==
The ship has seven decks, a duplex master suite, and a cinema and main saloon. It also has a jacuzzi, split-level sundeck and a garage that houses tenders, jet skis and dive equipment. It can accommodate 12 guests and 20 crew members.

== Engines ==
The main engines are two MTU 4000 Series V16 with power of 2720 KW (3648 hp) at 2100rpm.

Anastasia can reach a maximum speed of 18 knots (33 km/h), while the cruising speed is 15.0 knots (27.8 km/h).

== Gallery ==
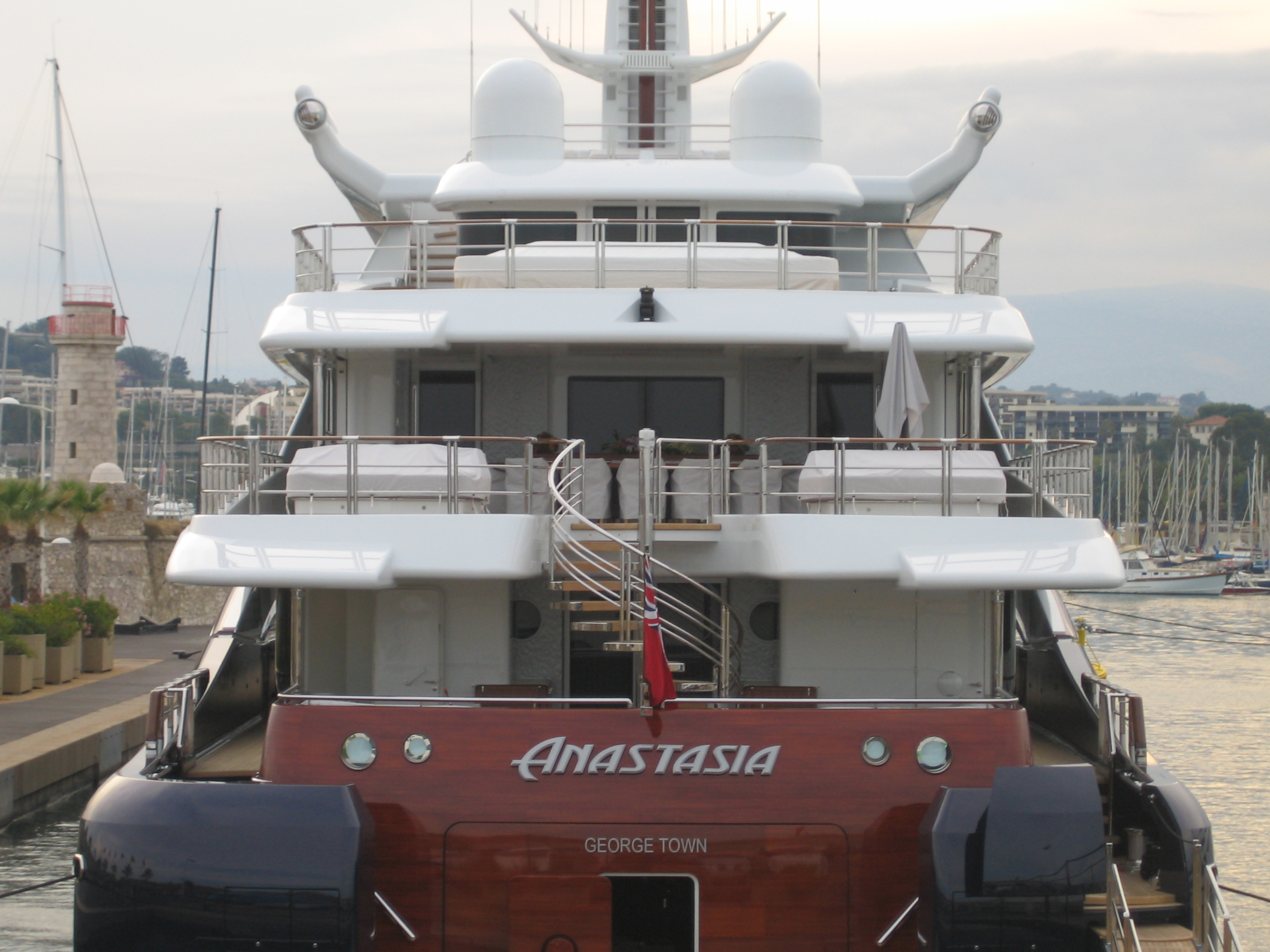

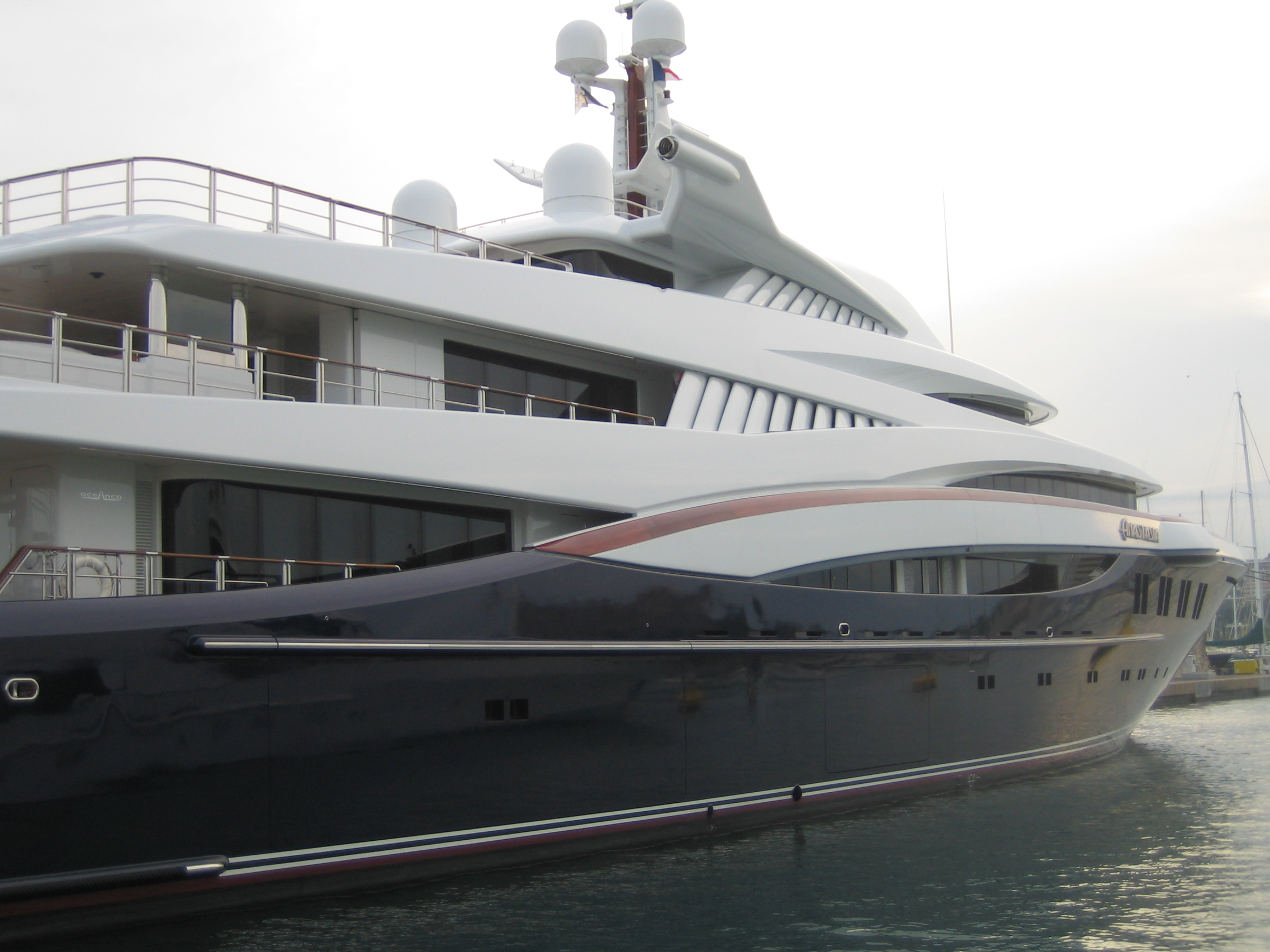

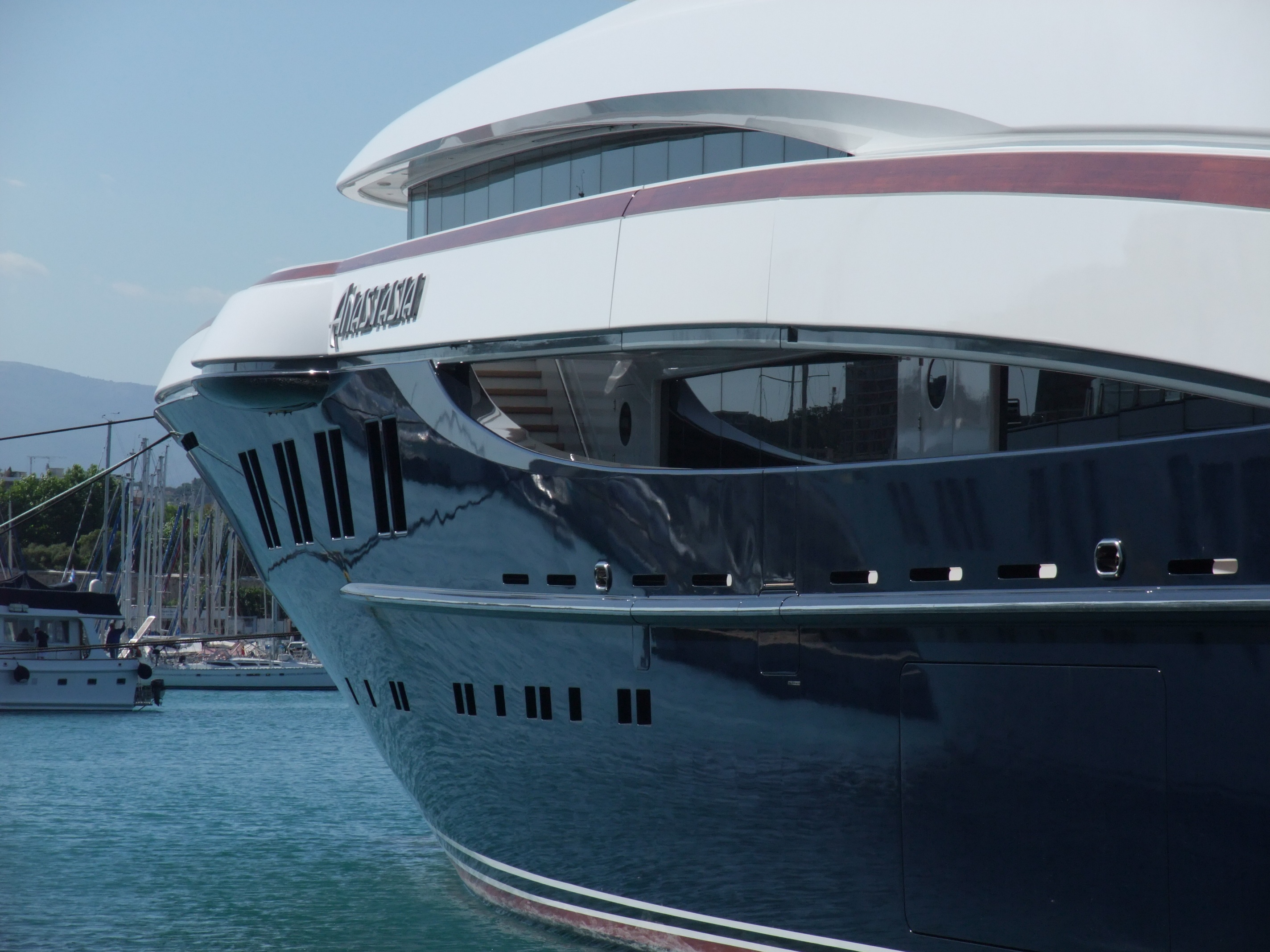

== See also ==
- Pelorus
- Alysia
- Azimut
- Benetti
- List of yachts built by Oceanco
