= Watania =

Takaful company based in Abu Dhabi

National Takaful Company (Watania) PJSC
- Company type: Public
- Traded as: ADX: WATANIA
- Industry: Takaful
- Founded: 12 July 2011; 14 years ago
- Headquarters: Al Jazeera Tower; Al Muroor Road, Abu Dhabi, United Arab Emirates
- Key people: Ali Saeed Sultan Bin Harmel Al Dhaheri (Chairman); Gautam Datta (CEO)
- Products: General takaful; Health takaful
- Revenue: ▲AED 272 million (2017)
- Net income: ▲AED 8 million (2016)
- Total assets: ▼AED 323 million (2016)
- Total equity: ▲AED 85 million (2016)
- Parent: MB UAE Investments LLC (51.00%) (wholly owned by MB Holding); Al Madina Insurance Company SAOG (9.53%) (26% owned by MB Holding)
- Website: www.watania.ae

National Takaful Company (Watania) PJSC (Arabic: وطنية للتكافل) is a takaful company based in Abu Dhabi, United Arab Emirates.

The company was created in 2011 by Abu Dhabi National Islamic Finance, Abu Dhabi National Insurance Company, TAQA and Aldar Properties. These founding investors floated around 55 percent of the company's shares in an initial public offering which was seven times oversubscribed. The company commenced operations shortly after, with the opening of two branches in Abu Dhabi and Dubai over the following two years.

In 2014, Oman-based conglomerate MB Holding acquired a 60.5 percent stake in the company through two subsidiaries, including Al Madina Takaful.

Watania operates using the wakala model and offers general and health takaful products.
