= Manaseer Group =

Holding company (established 1999)

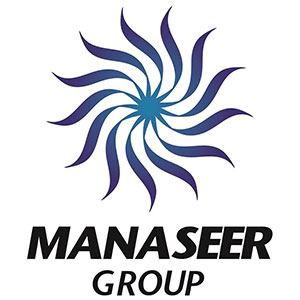
- Company type: Private
- Industry: Infrastructure, Energy, Business solutions, Consumer products & services, Chemicals
- Founded: 1999
- Founder: Eng. Ziyad Manasir
- Fate: Worldwide
- Headquarters: Amman, Jordan
- Key people: Ziyad Manasir (Chairman), Muin Qadada (Vice Chairman), Andreas Denker (CEO), Saed Dajani (CFO)
- Products: Food industries, Gas and Lubricants Distribution, Industrial Chemicals, Fertilizer Manufacturing, International Trading, Warehousing Services, Scrap Recycling and Reprocessing, Cement and Ready Mix Production, Steel Manufacturing, Crushed Stone Production
- Brands: Manaseer Gas
- Owner: Eng. Ziyad Manasir
- Number of employees: 10000
- Subsidiaries: Manaseer Machinery, Manaseer Cement, Manaseer Iron & Steel, Manaseer Ready Mix, Manaseer Concrete, Manaseer Food, Manaseer crushers, Manaseer Oil & Gas, Manaseer Technology, Manaseer Visions, Manaseer Chemicals, Manaseer Trade, Manaseer Import & Export, Manaseer Transport, Manaseer Invest, Lumi Market
- Website: www.manaseergroup.com

Manseer Group is a holding company established in the year 1999 in Jordan by Ziyad Manasir who is currently its chairman. The Company operates mainly in Jordan and has activity in West Bank as well and manages 16 subsidiary companies related to infrastructure, energy, business solutions, consumer products and services, and chemicals.

== History ==
The beginning in year 1999, Manaseer, was with a chemical and fertilizer distribution company with a total head count of 15 employees. Since then the group has grown to include more than 19 companies related to Infrastructure, Energy, Business solutions, Consumer products & services, Chemicals, and doing partnerships with three of the biggest companies in the kingdom.

=== Manaseer Iron and Steel (2001) ===
The Company manufactures steel from the kingdom’s resources of scrap metal to produce steel billets and reinforced steel.

=== Manaseer concrete products (2006) ===
Manaseer concrete company was established in 2006.

=== Manaseer Cement and Mining (2009) ===
In order to complete the cycle of construction services rendered to the customers, Manaseer group established Manaseer Cement Industry in 2009.

The company has signed an agreement with the European company FLS to supply production lines, equipment and civil work design, as well as commissioning the plant with a capacity of 3.5 million ton annually.

The production started in 2012.

=== Manaseer Oil & Gas (2002) ===
Manaseer Oil & Gas is the first company in Jordan to manage a chain of fuel stations.

=== Manaseer Import & Export (2012) ===
The company is concerned with importing and exporting oil and lubricants.

=== Manaseer Vision (2010) ===
The Company handles car parts and accessories.

=== Manaseer Machinery Trading (2012) ===
The company provides business solutions through the representation of PACCAR (DAF, Kenworth & Peterbilt) for trucks, Diesel Engines, Concord Concrete Pumps, Kawasaki & Kobelco Heavy Machinery, GoodYear Tires and Petro Canada Oil & Lubricants in addition to TRP spare parts.

=== Manaseer Invest (2007) ===
The company’s main aim is to serve the group in the Real Estate market, Property management and investing in other companies by buying shares, importing and exporting, owning transferable and non-transferable funds for the company’s continuity.

=== Manaseer Food (2003) ===
Manaseer Food is concerned with the production of extra virgin olive oil under the brand name “TERRA ROSSA”.

=== Lumi Market (2012) ===
drinks, snacks, groceries and hygiene products

=== Manaseer Trade (1999) ===
The company was established in 1999 to Import & export chemicals, fertilizers and trading of agricultural seeds.

=== Manaseer Chemicals (2002) ===
The company’s aim is to pioneer the production, and manufacture of fertilizers and chemicals using creative ideas and solutions. The company has a French designed NPK Fertilizer factory that uses a special and fully automatic mixing technology, a Urea Phosphate plant was then created using a Swiss technology. Production capacity of both facilities exceeds 60K tons annually.

== Manaseer Foundation ==
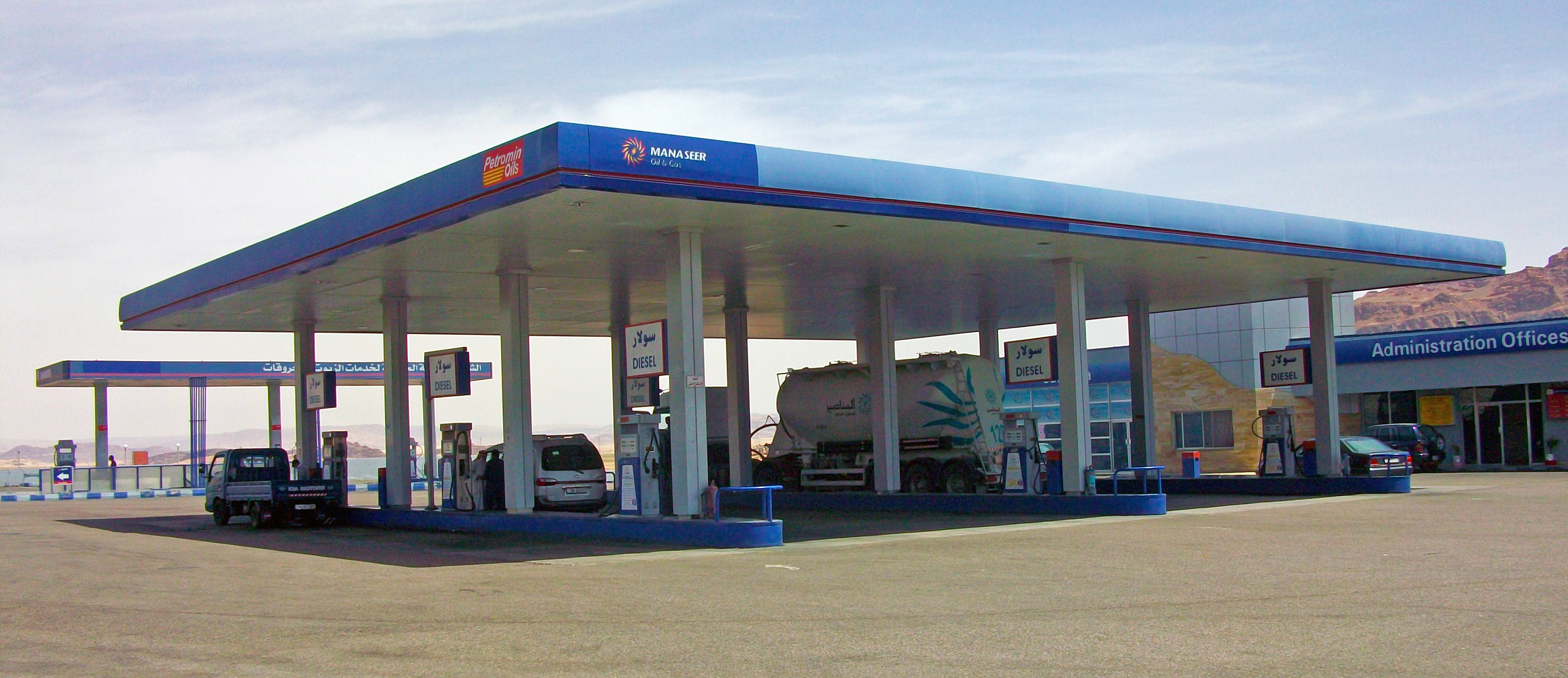
A Manaseer station along Jordan's Desert Highway near Wadi Rum
