= Mohammed Al Barwani =

Omani billionaire businessman

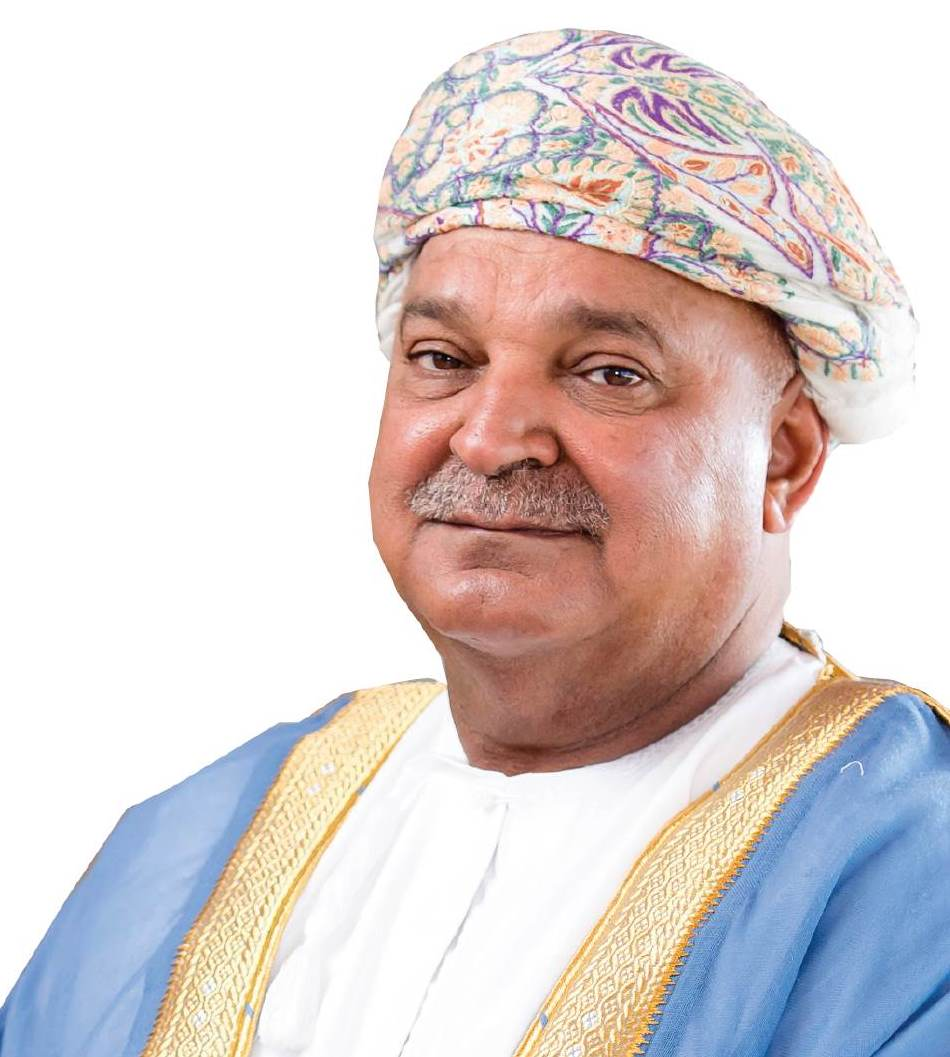
- Born: Mohammed Bin Ali Bin Mohammed Al Barwani; October 30, 1951 (age 74)
- Education: Miami University; Heriot-Watt University
- Known for: founder, owner and chairman, MB Holding former owner, Oceanco
- Spouse: Sharifa al Harthy
- Children: 5

Mohammed bin Ali bin Mohammed Al Barwani (born October 30, 1951) is an Omani billionaire businessman, the founder and chairman of MB Holding Group of companies, which operate in oil and gas exploration and production, oilfield services, engineering and mining.

== Early life ==
Mohammed Al Barwani was born in Oman. In 1975 he earned a bachelor's degree in Science from Miami University, Ohio, and a bachelor's in chemical engineering from the University of Texas at Austin in 1981. In 1980, he earned a master's degree, and in 2010 received an honorary doctorate in petroleum engineering, both from Heriot-Watt University in Edinburgh, UK, yet styles himself as "Dr. Mohammed Al Barwani".

== Career ==
Barwani started his career in the oil industry as a reservoir engineer for Petroleum Development Oman (PDO), a joint venture of Shell and the Government of Oman, where he worked from 1976 to 1986.

Barwani founded MB Holding in 1982 to provide oilfield services. MB expanded into oil and gas exploration and production, and then engineering services and subsequently founded Mawarid Mining in 1987 and Petrogas in 1999. In 1997 he acquired KC Drilling in Hungary, in 2000, Erdol-Edgas Workover in Germany, and in 2004 United Engineering Services, in Oman. He also acquired Hyspec in the United Kingdom, in 2012.

Barwani is the former owner of the Dutch yacht builder Oceanco. He first visited the company in 2009, and acquired it from Greek businessman Theodore Angelopoulos in 2010. He sold Oceanco to Gabe Newell in 2025. In 2015, Barwani bought the Turkish shipyard Turquoise Yachts. He runs Musstir, a property developer with "stakes in several hotels in Oman".

Barwani is a non-executive director of a number of publicly traded and joint stock companies, Al Madina Insurance co. SAOG, Al Madina Investments SAOG (Muscat Stock Market), Nautilus Minerals. He was formerly a non-executive director of Oman Air, Shell Oman Marketing Company, Taageer Leasing Company, Oman, and National Bank of Oman. He is a member of the International SeaKeepers Society.

Barwani was included in the book Those Who Inspire Oman, published in November 2012 by the publishing house Those Who Inspire Ltd.

As of May 2016, Forbes estimated his net worth at US$1.01 billion.

In 2020, Barwani was appointed as chairman of Oman Air the national airline of Oman.

== Personal life ==
He is married to Sharifa al Harthy, who has always been involved in the company, and she is deputy chairman of MB Holding. They live in Muscat, and have five children, all of whom work for MB Holding.

Barwani owns several boats, with the 32-metre yacht Sharifa being the largest.
