= Alysia =

Luxury motor yacht

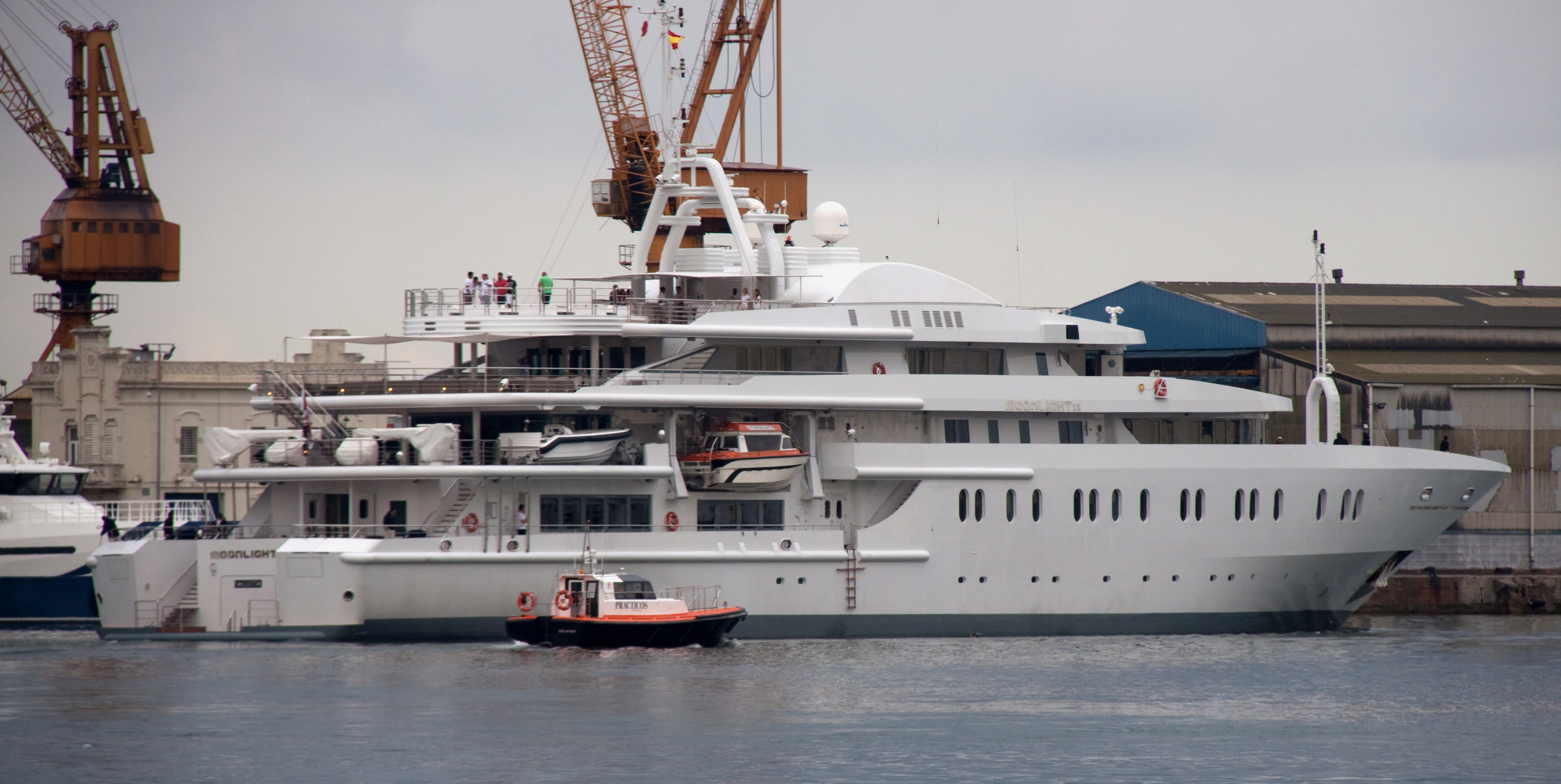

History

Malta
- Name: Alysia
- Operator: Livers Yacht
- Builder: Neorion S.A.
- Launched: 2006
- Notes: Call sign: 9HFR8; IMO number: 9288215; MMSI number: 215934000

General characteristics
- Class & type: Yacht Charter
- Tonnage: 2,990 GT
- Length: 85.30 m (279.9 ft)
- Beam: 14.44 m (47.4 ft)
- Draft: 3.70 m (12.1 ft)
- Propulsion: 2 × Caterpillar 3606 engines; 2 × 2,750 hp (2,050 kW)
- Speed: 18 knots (33 km/h) (maximum); 14 knots (26 km/h) (cruising)
- Capacity: 36 passengers
- Crew: 36 crew

Alysia is a luxury charter Motor yacht owned by Greek businessman Andreas Liveras. She was constructed in steel during 2006 by the Neorion ship-yard for a cost of about 116 million EUR. This made her Forbes magazine's most expensive yacht in the world for 2006.

== Statistics ==
Alysia is 85.30 m (279.9 ft) long, 14.44 m (47.4 ft) in the beam and has a draft of 3.70 m (12.1 ft). The ship has a gross tonnage of 2,990 GT. She can accommodate up to 36 guests and 36 crew. The main engines are twin Caterpillar 3606s, with maximum output of 2,750 horsepower (2,050 kW) each. She has a maximum speed of 18 knots (33 km/h; 21 mph) and a cruising speed of 14.2 knots (26.3 km/h; 16.3 mph). Her auxiliary diesel generators are three 500 kW Caterpillar 3412s and one Caterpillar 3406. Her propulsion system drives two variable pitch KaMeWa propellers. Her water capacity is 110,213 litres (24,243 imp gal; 29,115 US gal) and her fuel capacity is 234,455 litres (51,573 imp gal; 61,936 US gal) which provides a range of 7,000 miles (11,000 km). It was on sale for 85M euro.

Renovated and renamed Moonlight II in 2012, and offered for weekly rentals of 500,000 euro.

== Accommodation ==
Alysia has a large jacuzzi, two outside bars, water jets, diving equipment, fishing equipment and a small speed boat used for dives away from the yacht. The staterooms include a small cinema, large conference room and small restaurant.

== Moonlight II ==
The yacht was renamed Moonlight II in 2010 by her new owner, sheikh Khalifa bin Zayed Al Nahyan.
