= Gabe Newell =

American businessman (born 1962)

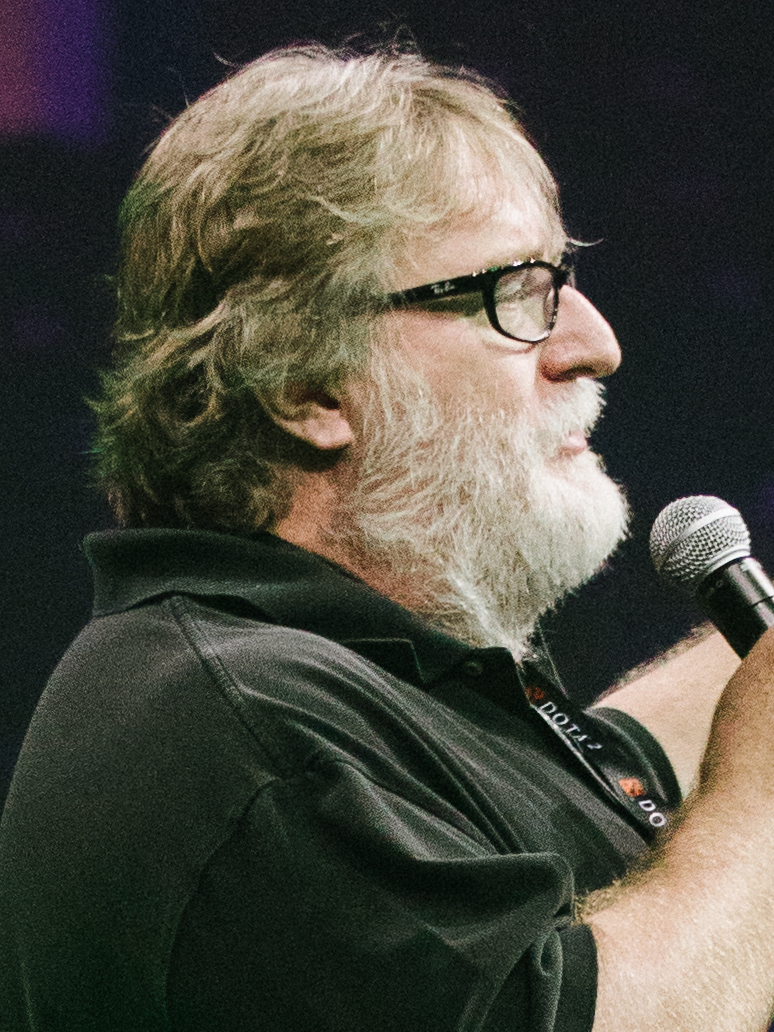
- Newell in 2018
- Born: Gabe Logan Newell; November 3, 1962 (age 64); Aspen, Colorado, U.S.
- Other name: Gaben
- Education: Harvard University (dropped out)
- Occupations: Video game developer; businessman
- Years active: 1983–present
- Known for: Co-founding Valve
- Title: President of Valve
- Spouse: Lisa Mennet Newell (m. 1996, divorced)
- Children: 2, including Gray
- Awards: BAFTA Fellowship (2013); AIAS Hall of Fame Award (2013)
- Gabe Newell's voice Newell introducing Valve at the 2013 LinuxCon

Gabe Logan Newell (born November 3, 1962), known by his nickname Gaben, is an American video game developer and businessman who is the co-founder and president of the video game company Valve.

Newell was born in Aspen, Colorado, and grew up in Davis, California. He attended Harvard University in the early 1980s but dropped out to join Microsoft, where he helped create the first versions of the Windows operating system. He also led development on a port of the game Doom for Windows 95.

In 1996, Newell and Mike Harrington left Microsoft to found Valve and fund the development of their first game, Half-Life (1998). After the success of Half-Life, Harrington sold his stake in Valve to Newell and left in 2000. Newell led development of Valve's digital distribution service, Steam, which launched in 2003 and controlled most of the market for downloaded PC games by 2011.

Forbes estimated that Newell owned at least half of Valve as of 2025. He is also the owner of the marine research organization Inkfish, the neuroscience company Starfish Neuroscience, and the custom yacht manufacturer Oceanco. Newell has been estimated as one of the wealthiest people in the United States and the wealthiest person in the video games industry, with an estimated net worth of $11 billion as of 2025.

== Early life and education ==
Gabe Logan Newell was born on November 3, 1962, at Aspen Valley Hospital in Aspen, Colorado, as the son of Donald Newell. He attended Davis Senior High School in Davis, California. He began computer programming in high school, at a time when programming was not an established career path, and imagined he would become a doctor. He worked as a paperboy, and later a telegram messenger for Western Union. In 1980, Newell enrolled at Harvard University to study programming.

== Career ==
=== Microsoft ===
While at Harvard, Newell visited his brother at Microsoft, which was not yet a major software developer. At the suggestion of the Microsoft executive Steve Ballmer, he dropped out of Harvard and began working at Microsoft. Newell said later that Microsoft was the best place in the world to learn to program at the time.

Newell spent 13 years at Microsoft as a programmer and technical executive, and produced the first three releases of the Windows operating system. In late 1995, Doom, a 1993 first-person shooter game developed by id Software, was estimated to be installed on more computers worldwide than Microsoft's new operating system, Windows 95. Newell said: "[id] ... didn't even distribute through retail, it distributed through bulletin boards and other pre-internet mechanisms. To me, that was a lightning bolt. Microsoft was hiring 500-people sales teams and this entire company was 12 people, yet it had created the most widely distributed software in the world. There was a sea change coming." At Microsoft, Newell led development on a port of Doom for Windows 95, which is credited with helping make Windows a viable game platform.

=== Valve ===
Inspired by Michael Abrash, who left Microsoft to work on the game Quake at id, Newell and another employee, Mike Harrington, left Microsoft to found the video game company Valve on August 24, 1996. Newell opted to found Valve instead of retiring as he felt working with "other really smart, motivated, socially orientated people to create product that would affect millions of other people" would be more fun.

Newell and Harrington funded development of the first Valve game, the first-person shooter Half-Life (1998), which was a critical and commercial success. Harrington sold his stake in Valve to Newell in 2000. Newell gave Valve no deadline and a "virtually unlimited" budget to develop Half-Life 2 (2004), promising to fund it himself if necessary. He and Valve came close to bankruptcy during a legal battle with Vivendi Games, which ended when an intern discovered an email revealing that Vivendi was destroying evidence.

During the development of Half-Life 2, Newell spent months developing Steam, a digital distribution service for games. By 2011, Steam controlled between 50% and 70% of the market for downloaded PC games and generated most of Valve's revenue. At a technology conference in Seattle that year, Newell argued that software piracy was best addressed by offering a superior option rather than pursuing anti-piracy technology. He cited Steam's success in Russia, where piracy is rife, as an example. Following the difficult development of Half-Life 2, Newell said he became "obsessed" with improving Valve's work-life balance.

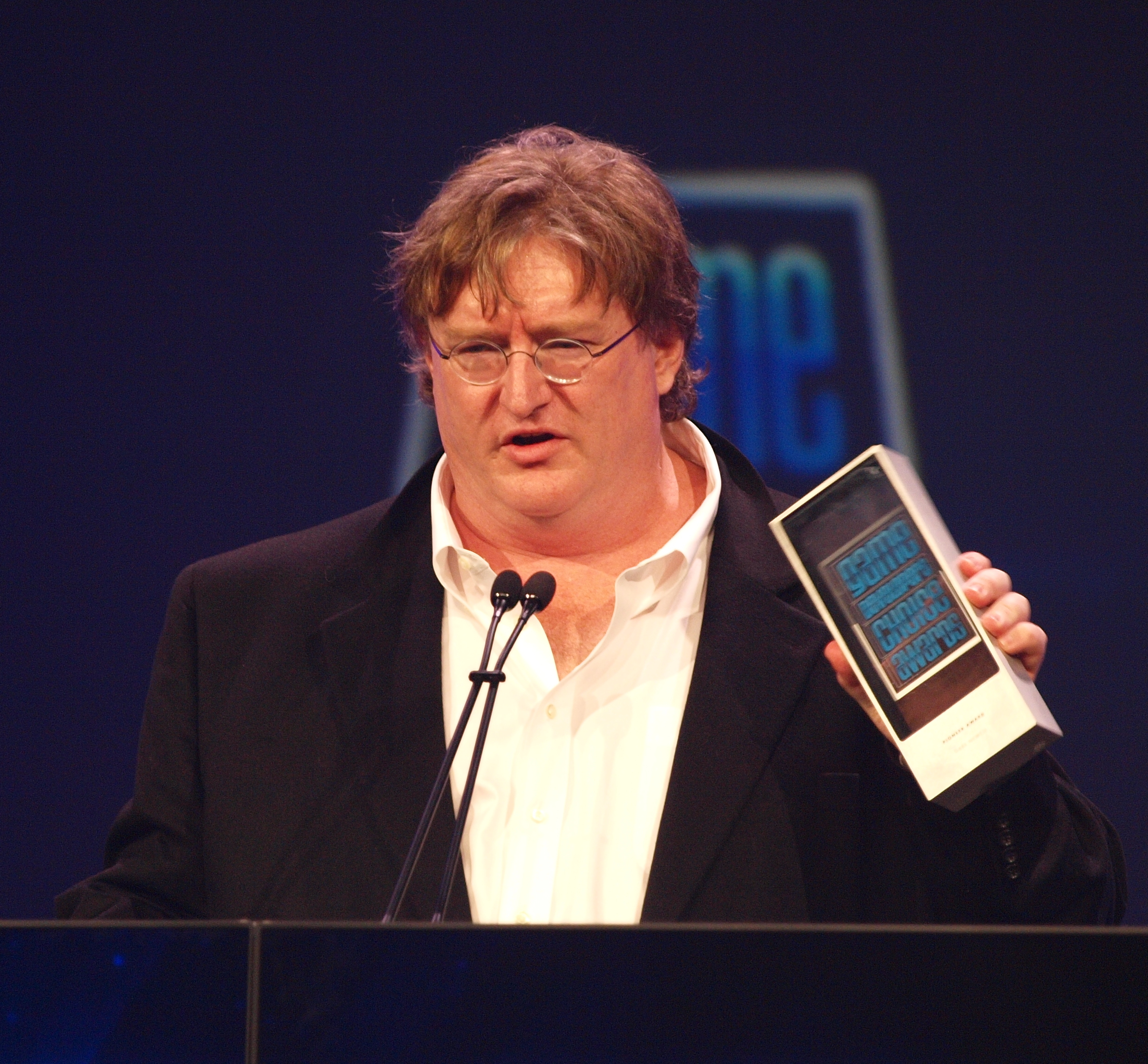
Newell accepting the Pioneer Award at the 2010 Game Developers Conference

In 2007, Newell expressed his displeasure over developing for game consoles, saying that developing processes for Sony's PlayStation 3 was a "waste of everybody's time". On stage at Sony's keynote at E3 2010, he acknowledged his criticism but discussed the open nature of the PlayStation 3 and announced a port of Portal 2, remarking that with Steamworks support it would be the best version for any console. Newell also criticized the Xbox Live service, referring to it as a "train wreck", and Windows 8, calling it a threat to the open nature of PC gaming. At the 2013 LinuxCon, Newell said the Linux operating system and open source development were "the future of gaming". He accused the proprietary systems of companies such as Microsoft and Apple of stifling innovation through slow certification processes.

In 2009, IGN named Newell one of the top 100 game creators, writing that it was "almost impossible to gauge" Valve's influence on game design, technology and the video games industry. In December 2010, Forbes listed Newell as "A Name You Need to Know", primarily for his work on Steam and partnerships with multiple major developers. In 2013, Newell was added to the Academy of Interactive Arts & Sciences Hall of Fame and received the BAFTA Fellowship for his contributions to the video game industry.

According to Josh Weier, the project lead for Portal 2 (2011), Newell became less involved in game development after Portal 2 as many developers would blindly agree with his ideas due to his position. As of 2024, Newell had become less involved in Valve and was spending more time on personal projects.

=== Marine research ===
Newell's superyacht, the Leviathan, in 2025

Newell is the owner of the marine research organization Inkfish, which owns several ships and submarines. In November 2022, Inkfish purchased the Hadal Exploration System, a private deep-sea exploration platform, from the undersea explorer Victor Vescovo. In August 2025, Newell acquired the yacht manufacturer Oceanco. Newell's custom-built superyacht, the Leviathan, launched in 2025.

=== Other ventures ===
Around 2013, Newell co-founded and funded Foundry10, an educational research organization. In 2018, Newell donated $20 million to the American artificial intelligence company OpenAI and acted as an informal advisor. In 2022, with Philip Sabes, Newell co-founded the neuroscience company Starfish Neuroscience to develop neural interfaces. In May 2025, Starfish announced that their first chip would be released late that year.

=== Charity work ===
In 2020, Newell and the Valve employee Yahn Bernier created a car racing team, the Heart of Racing, to raise funds for children's charities in Seattle and New Zealand. In the same year, Newell worked with Wētā Workshop and Rocket Lab to send a gnome figure from Half-Life 2: Episode Two into space. Newell donated $1 for every person who watched the launch video in 24 hours. The money went to the pediatric intensive care unit at the Starship Children's Hospital in Auckland, New Zealand.

== Net worth ==
In October 2017, Forbes listed Newell among the 100 wealthiest people in the United States, with an estimated net worth of $5.5 billion. In December 2021, Forbes estimated that Newell had a net worth of $3.9 billion and owned at least one quarter of Valve, making him the richest person in the video game industry. In 2025, Forbes estimated that Newell owned at least half of Valve and had a net worth of $11 billion.

== Personal life ==
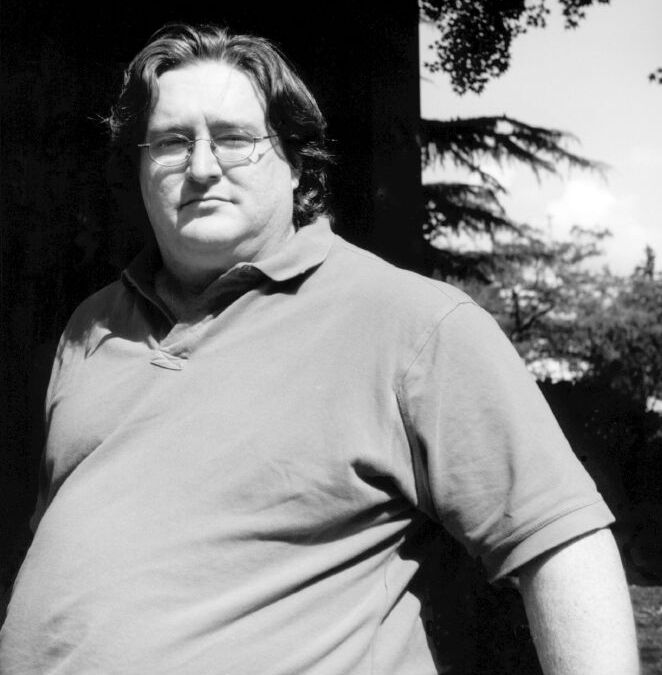
Newell in 2002

Newell formerly suffered from Fuchs' dystrophy, a congenital disease which affects the cornea. He was cured via two cornea transplants in 2006 and 2007. On the same day he founded Valve with Harrington, Newell married Lisa Mennet. They have two sons; their eldest, Gray, is a professional race car driver. The birth of Gray in the late 1990s inspired the final boss of Half-Life, as the couple considered childbirth the most frightening thing they could think of at the time. Newell and Mennet divorced around 2016.

In 2011, Newell said his favorite games included Super Mario 64, Doom, and a Burroughs mainframe version of the 1971 Star Trek game, which was the first game he ever played. Doom convinced him that games were the future of entertainment, and Super Mario 64 convinced him that games were art. Newell was a fan of the animated series My Little Pony: Friendship Is Magic.

Within the gaming community, Newell has the nickname Gaben, derived from his work email address. Newell said that he tried to grow into his public image: "[Fans] hug me when they run into me. I'm not a hugging person, but that's what they want. I was with my kids the first time that happened in public, and my kids were pretty cool with it. But I wasn't. 'Dad, roll with it.' Even now, I'm learning from our customers." In 2018, he also recorded a "deadpan" self-referential voice pack for the Valve game Dota 2.

Newell was visiting New Zealand with friends when the COVID-19 pandemic emerged, and stayed in Auckland once travel restrictions were eased. As an expression of gratitude for New Zealand's hospitality, he and others arranged a free event, We Love Aotearoa, with live performances from musicians across New Zealand. It was accompanied by VR stands for Valve games such as Half-Life: Alyx and The Lab. The event was postponed from August to December due to a lockdown induced by a second wave of COVID-19. Newell applied for permanent residency in New Zealand in October 2020, but had returned to Seattle by 2021.

Since the 1990s, Newell has owned and sold several homes in Seattle, including a home in Capitol Hill, two homes on Lake Washington and a holiday home in Long Beach Peninsula. He owns several ships and has lived mostly at sea since the pandemic. In June 2026, he purchased a 20,000-square-foot mansion in Florida for $70.8 million, with 7 bedrooms, 13 bathrooms, an 8-car garage, an outdoor pool, a dock, a boat lift, an elevator, and a private tunnel to a beach. As of 2026, Newell had lost a substantial amount of weight.
