= H3 (yacht) =

Luxury motor yacht

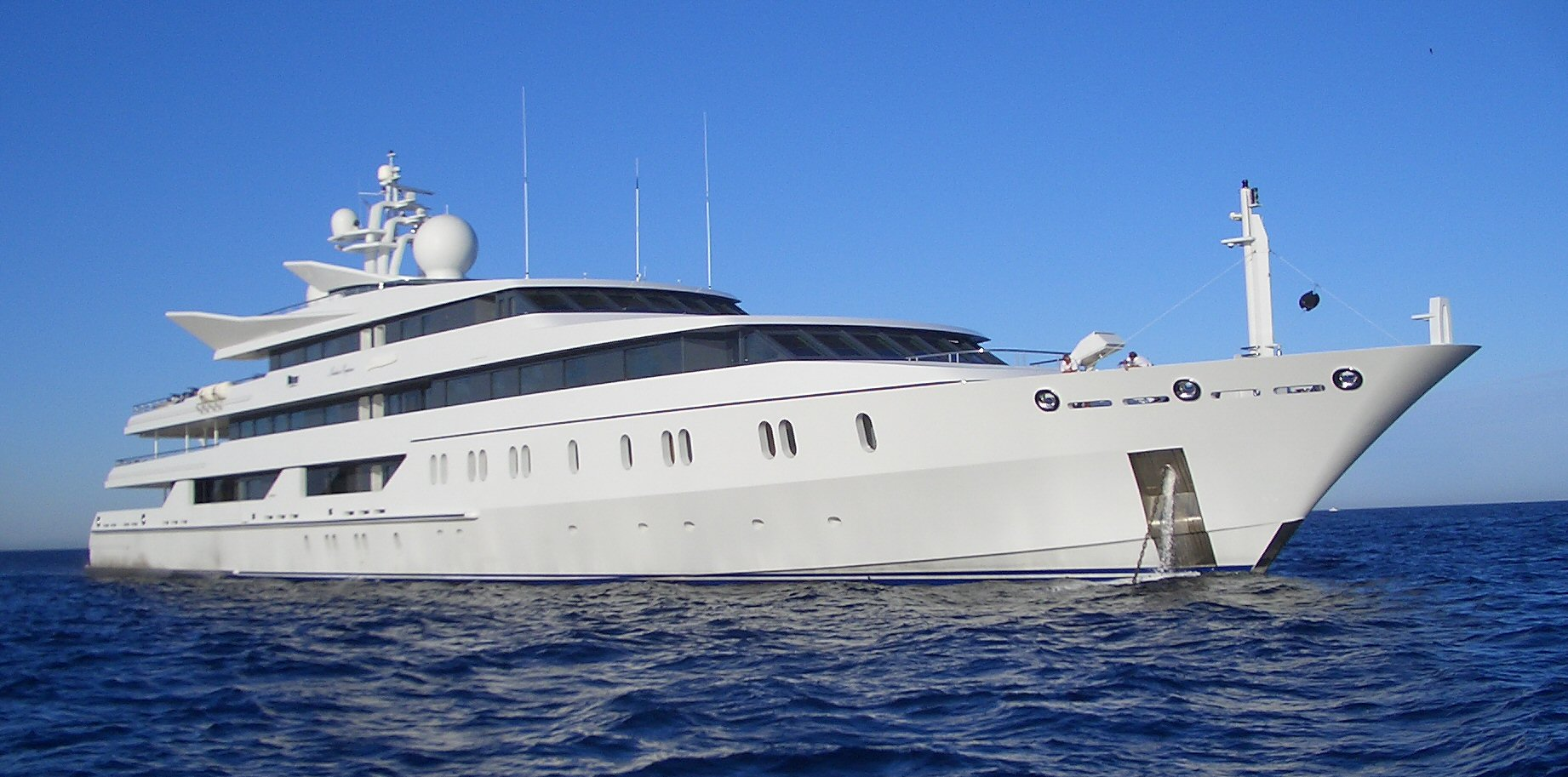
- H3 before refit

History
- Name: H3
- Owner: Waleed bin Ibrahim Al Ibrahim
- Port of registry: George Town, Cayman Islands
- Builder: Oceanco
- Yard number: 950 / Refit: 0105H
- In service: 2000
- Identification: IMO number: 1006245; MMSI number: 319259800; Callsign: ZGKB8
- Status: Sea trials

General characteristics (pre refit)
- Class & type: Commercial LY2
- Tonnage: 3,176 GT
- Length: 95 m (311 ft 8 in)
- Beam: 14.6 m (47 ft 11 in)
- Height: 22 m (72 ft 2 in)
- Draught: 4.6 m (15 ft 1 in)
- Decks: 5
- Installed power: 3 x 6,720 kW (9,010 hp)
- Propulsion: 3 x MTU 20 V 1163
- Speed: 23 knots (43 km/h; 26 mph)
- Capacity: 34 persons
- Crew: 33 persons

General characteristics (post refit)
- Class & type: IMO Tier III
- Tonnage: 3,521 GT
- Length: 105 m (344 ft 6 in)
- Beam: 14.6 m (47 ft 11 in)
- Decks: 5
- Installed power: 3 x 6720 kW
- Propulsion: 3 x MTU 20 V 1163
- Speed: 23 knots
- Capacity: 34 persons
- Crew: 33 persons

H3 is a luxury yacht, measuring 105 metres (344 feet 6 inches) in length. launched in 2000 as Al Mirqab, she had her hull assembled in Durban, South Africa, and then finished at the Oceanco yard in the Netherlands to the design of the A Group. H3 is powered by two 10,000-hp MTU 20-cylinder engines with speeds available of up to 24 knots.

== History ==
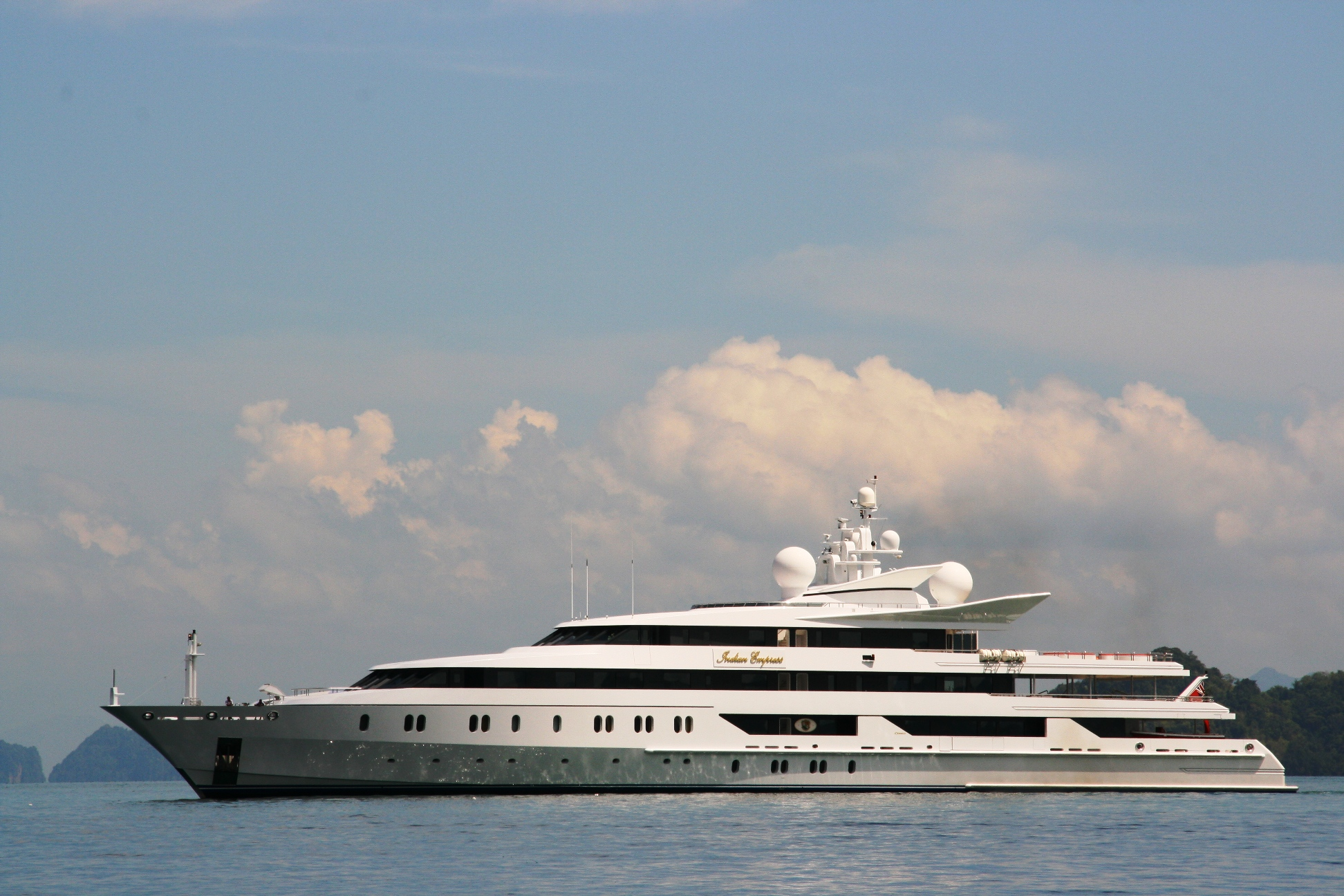
Cruising in the Andaman Sea near Phuket, Thailand

=== Previous ownership ===
The yacht was initially owned by Hamad bin Jassim bin Jaber Al Thani and was known as Al Mirqab.

Indian businessman Vijay Mallya bought the yacht in 2006 for an undisclosed purchase price and renamed her Indian Empress.

In 2018, she was sold for €35 million to a member of the Saudi Royal Family and renamed NEOM to promote the new city also named Neom.

In 2020, NEOM went back to Oceanco for a refit by her current owner, from which she emerged in 2023 with a new name, H3.

=== Legal issues ===
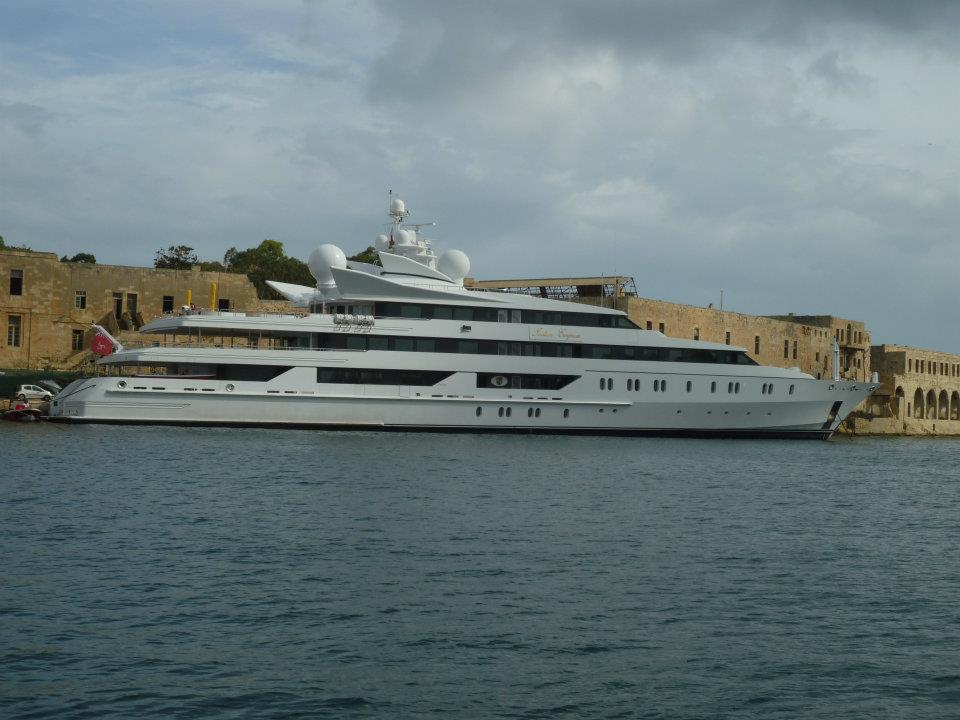
Docked in the harbor of Valletta, Malta

During 2017, Mallya was suspected of financial crimes, which included non-payment of ship expenses and crew salaries. As Indian Empress was moored in Valletta, Malta at the time, the yacht was held there under court order, and then auctioned by the courts on June 28, 2018. The winning bid of €43.5 million was made by Maltese company Credityacht Ltd, on behalf of an unnamed Iranian client. They subsequently had seven days to deposit the funds, but failed to meet that deadline. Credityacht Ltd. then requested a 15-day extension to make the payment. The union for maritime workers, Nautilus International representing the up to 40 crew members who were owed collectively a reported €1 million-plus in unpaid salaries, accepted the request, but several other creditors declined.

The Maltese court then set a new date to re-auction the yacht after the first purchased attempt defaulted. The second auction was to be held on September 19, 2018. Serious bidders were required to deposit €1 million 48 hours in advance to take part in the auction. Credityacht Ltd., was banned from participating. The auction did not proceed however, as one day earlier, the court approved a €35 million private offer made by Sea Beauty Yachting Limited on behalf of unnamed clients. Credityacht was ordered to pay the difference between their initial bid and the final sale price as penalty for defaulting.

=== Refit ===
After the sale, the yacht was brought back to her builder for an extensive refit by the design of Reymond Langton as project 1050H. The work included the yacht to be extended by 10 m (33 ft) and a completely rebuilt superstructure. She was relaunched on 25 January 2023 as H3, after Waleed bin Ibrahim Al Ibrahims wife Hana.

== See also ==
- List of yachts built by Oceanco
