= Oceanco =

Custom yacht builder

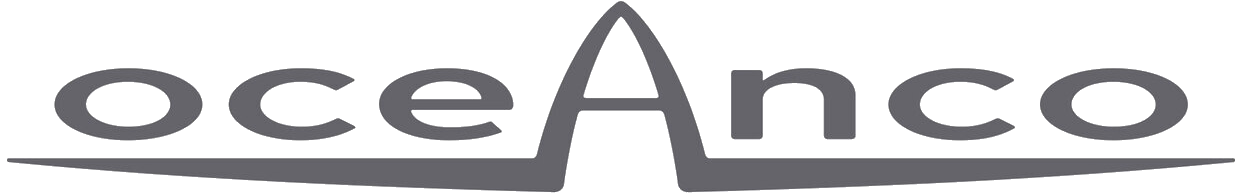
- Type: Private
- Industry: Shipbuilding
- Founded: 1987; 39 years ago
- Headquarters: Alblasserdam, Netherlands
- Key people: Gabe Newell; Marcel Onkenhout
- Products: Megayachts
- Owner: Gabe Newell
- Website: oceancoyacht.com

Oceanco is a privately owned custom yacht builder, based in the Netherlands, that has been building full displacement yachts in the 80-metre (260 ft) range since 1987. Since August 2025, it has been owned by Gabe Newell, an American video game developer and businessman.

== History ==
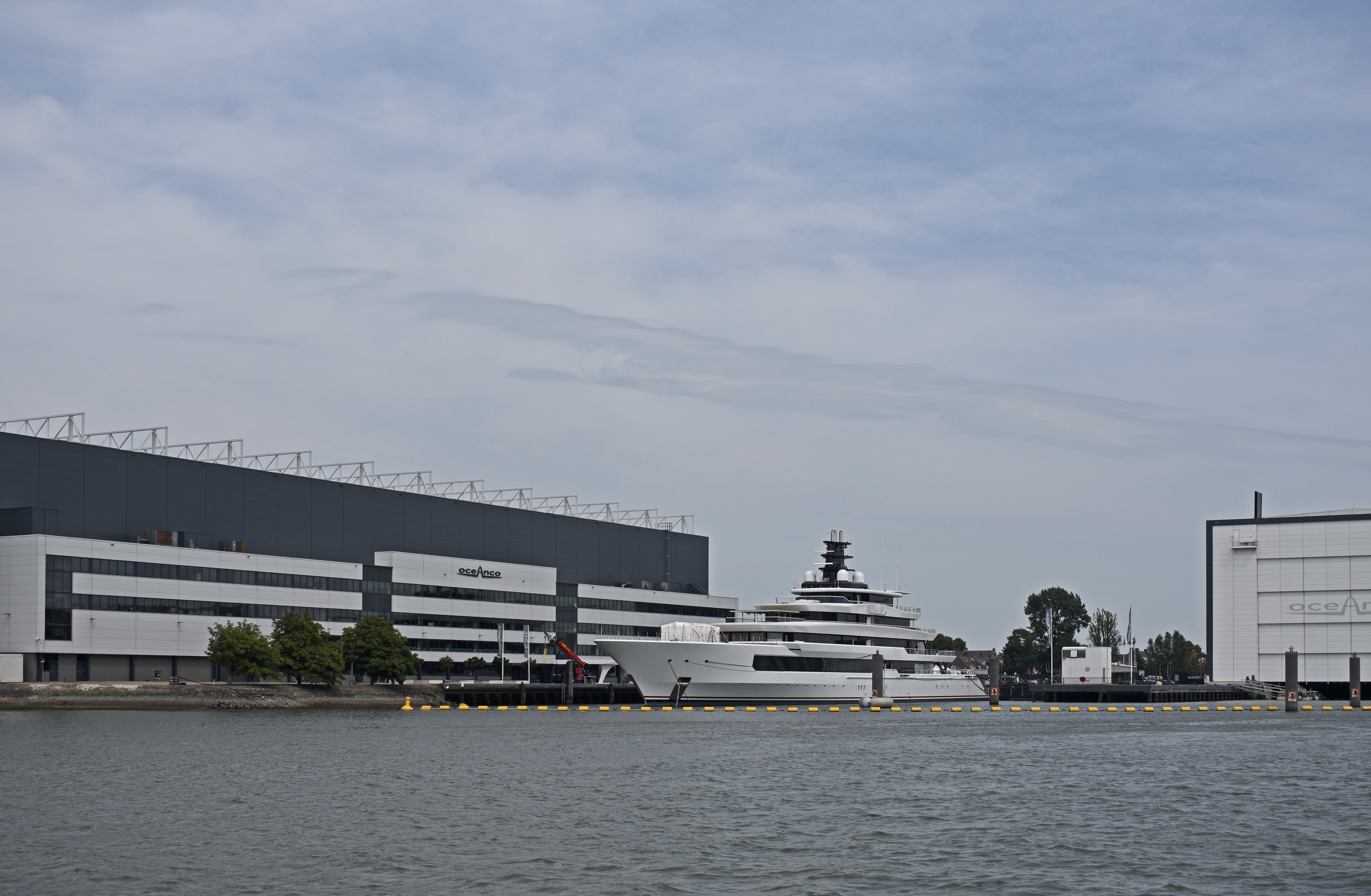
Oceanco shipyard in Alblasserdam

Oceanco was founded in 1987, when a group of South African private investors, led by then-CEO Richard Hein, began building yachts. The hulls and superstructures were built in Durban, South Africa. The yachts were then transported to various facilities in the Netherlands, where the finishing work took place.

In 2002, Theodore Angelopoulos took control of Oceanco. He embarked on a new building strategy focusing on the niche market of 80m+ megayachts and developed the "Y Generation" of Oceanco yachts, which included Amevi (Y701), an 80 m (260 ft) and Alfa Nero (Y702) 82 m (269 ft).

In 2008, the 75.50 m (247.7 ft) Anastasia was launched and in May 2009, the company launched the 85.47 m (280.4 ft) Vibrant Curiosity with her amidships atrium, a 7 m (23 ft) pool and large interior volumes designed by Nuvolari & Lenard.

In March 2010, Mohammed Al Barwani, a private investor based in the Sultanate of Oman, acquired Oceanco. Marcel Onkenhout, who had been with the company for 20 years, served as the CEO.

Oceanco delivered Sunrays, an 85.50 m (280.5 ft) megayacht, in March 2010. The late Björn Johansson designed her exterior lines, and the interior design is by Terence Disdale. She was succeeded by the 86 m (282 ft) Nuvolari & Lenard designed Man of Steel (ex-Seven Seas), delivered in November 2010. The Sam Sorgiovanni designed 88.50 m (290.4 ft) Nirvana was delivered in spring 2012, followed by St. Princess Olga (renamed Amore Vero) at 85.60 m (280.8 ft) in 2013, Equanimity at 91.50 m (300.2 ft) in 2014 and Infinity at 88.50 m (290.4 ft) in 2015.

As of 2018, the largest yacht built by Oceanco was Jubilee (in 2017 renamed Kaos). In 2018, the yard launched "Project Bravo," a 109 m superyacht.

The company operates in its extended production facility (a total of 8.2 ha) located in Alblasserdam, approximately 20 km from Rotterdam, the Netherlands. The yard has almost unrestricted direct access via the inland waterway system to the North Sea.

Oceanco has built 29 custom superyachts up to 117 m in length. Several 100 m+ yachts are currently under construction. The company can simultaneously build five yachts in the 80 m+ category (at various stages of design, engineering and construction), delivering approximately two superyachts per year. In 2008, the company acquired more land adjacent to the present yard, and in 2010, it set about demolishing the old buildings and slips to make way for a new covered dry dock, which now allows it to construct yachts up to 140 metres.

In 2022, Oceanco was building a 417-foot (127 m), $500 million schooner for Jeff Bezos, owner of Amazon. Oceanco asked for permission to temporarily remove the middle span of a historic bridge in Rotterdam known as "De Hef", so that the yacht could sail out to sea. The proposal touched off a public outcry, with citizens threatening to throw eggs and tomatoes at the vessel as it passed, and Oceanco withdrew the request in June 2022.

In August 2025 it was reported that Gabe Newell had bought Oceanco from Al Barwani. The same month, Oceanco Group acquired Dutch maritime systems integrator Alewijnse. The following month, in September, it was reported that Oceanco had purchased a business complex in Zwijndrecht. which will result in 13,400 m2 being added to its existing facilities at this location.

Oceanco maintains a sales, design, marketing and communications office in Monaco.

== See also ==
- List of yachts built by Oceanco
