= Pekan (disambiguation) =

Pekan is a town in Pekan District, Pahang, Malaysia.

Pekan may also refer to:

- Pekan District
- Pekan (federal constituency), represented in the Dewan Rakyat
