= Pekan District =

- District of Pahang
- Daerah Pekan
- Seal

- Location of Pekan District in Pahang
- Interactive map of Pekan District
- Location of Pekan District in Malaysia
- Coordinates: 3°30′N 103°25′E
- Country: Malaysia
- State: Pahang
- Seat: Pekan
- Local area government(s): Pekan Municipal Council

Government
  - District officer: Ali Syahbana Sabaruddin

Area
  - Total: 3,846.14 km^{2} (1,485.00 sq mi)

Population (2010)
  - Total: 105,218
  - Density: 27.3568/km^{2} (70.8537/sq mi)
- Time zone: UTC+8 (MST)
  - Summer (DST): UTC+8 (Not observed)
- Postcode: 26xxx
- Calling code: +6-09
- Vehicle registration plates: C

The Pekan District is a district in Pahang, Malaysia. Located in the east of Pahang, the district borders Kuantan District on the north, South China Sea on the east, Maran District on the west and Rompin District on the south.

== Demographics ==
Historical population
Year	Pop.	±%
1991	86,179	—
2000	97,751	+13.4%
2010	105,587	+8.0%
2020	121,158	+14.7%

The following is based on Department of Statistics Malaysia 2010 census.

Ethnic groups in Pekan, 2010 census
Ethnicity	Population	Percentage
Malay	101,953	96.9%
Chinese	1,373	1.3%
Indian	392	0.4%
Others	1,500	1.4%
Total	105,218	100%

== Federal Parliament and State Assembly Seats ==
Pekan district representative in the Federal Parliament (Dewan Rakyat)

Parliament	Seat Name	Member of Parliament	Party
P85	Pekan	Sh Mohmed Puzi Sh Ali	BN (UMNO)

List of Pekan district representatives in the State Legislative Assembly (Dewan Undangan Negeri)

Parliament	State	Seat Name	State Assemblyman	Party
P85	N20	Pulau Manis	Mohd Rafiq Khan Ahman Khan	PN (PAS)
P85	N21	Peramu Jaya	Nizar Najib	BN (UMNO)
P85	N22	Bebar	Mohd. Fakhruddin Mohd. Arif	BN (UMNO)
P85	N23	Chini	Mohd Sharim Md Zain	BN (UMNO)

== Administrative divisions ==
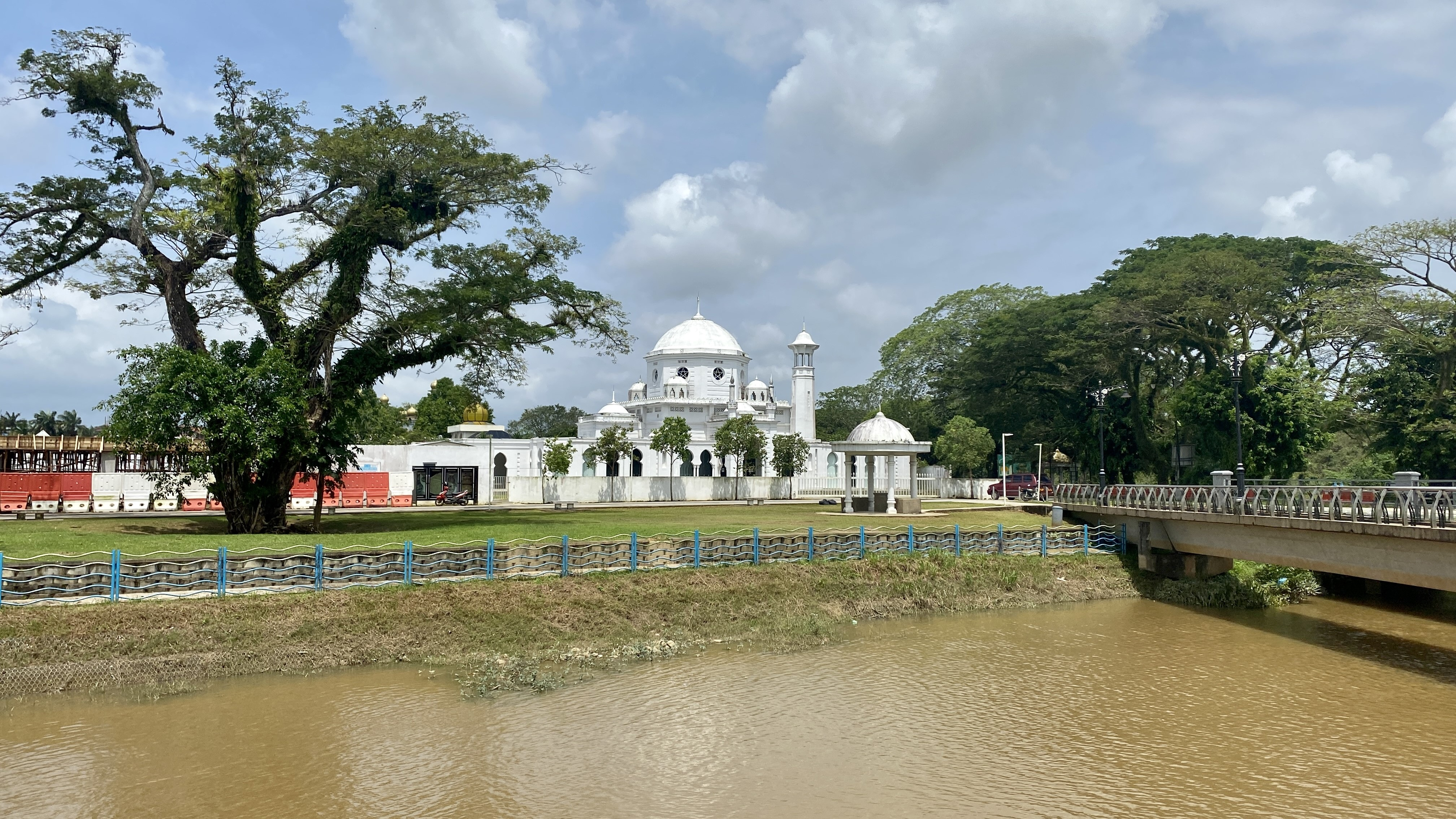
Sultan Abdullah Mosque in Pekan.

Map of Pekan district.

Pekan has 11 mukims, which are:

- Pekan (Capital)
- Bebar
- Temai
- Lepar
- Kuala Pahang
- Langgar
- Ganchong
- Pahang Tua
- Pulau Manis
- Pulau Rusa
- Penyor

== See also ==
- Districts of Malaysia
