= 1976 Pekan by-election =

- 21 February 1976

P071 seat in the Dewan Rakyat
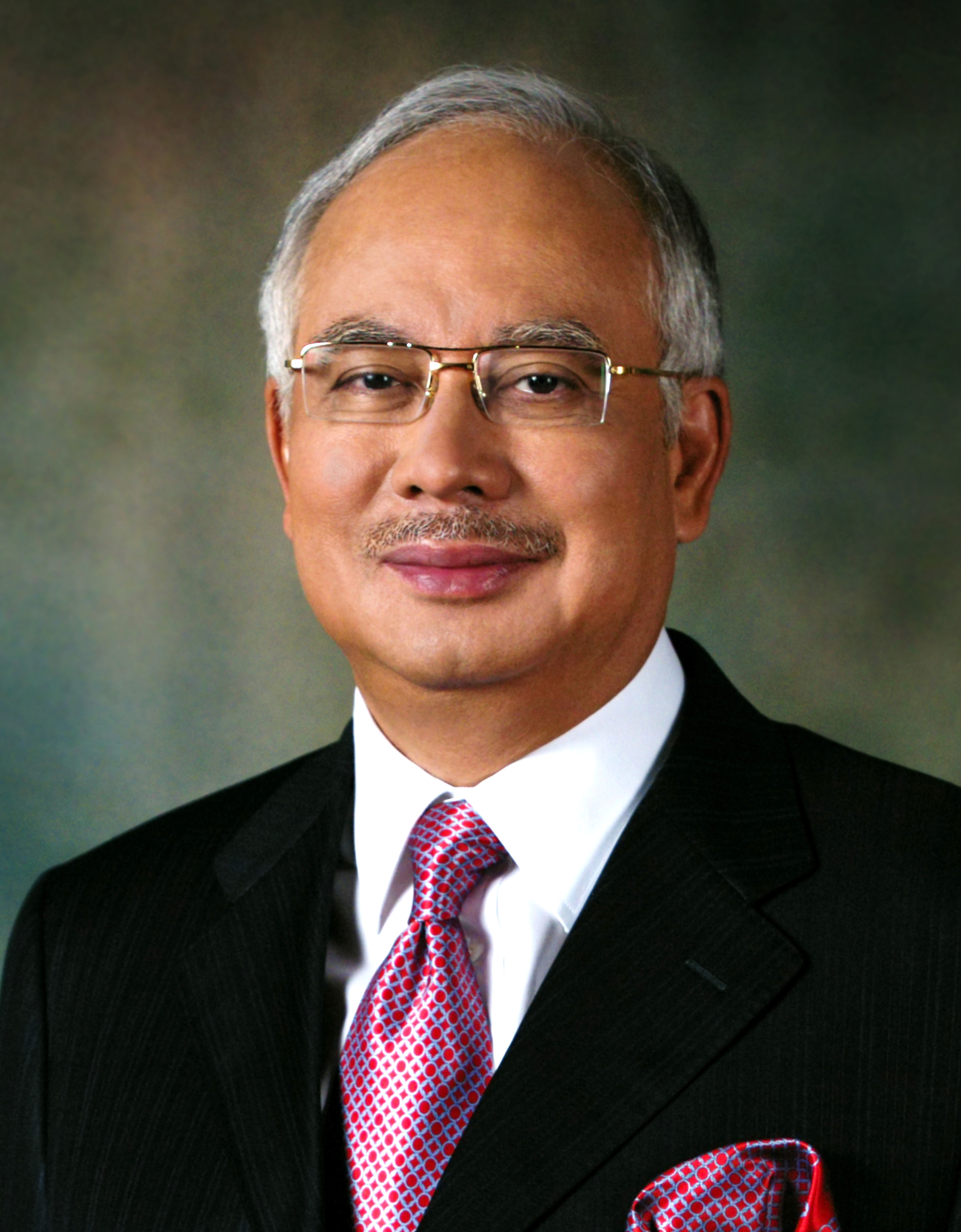
	First party
Candidate	Mohd Najib Abdul Razak
Party	UMNO
Alliance	BN
Popular vote	Won uncontested
Percentage	Won uncontested
MP before election
Abdul Razak Hussein
BN (UMNO)
Elected MP
Mohd Najib Abdul Razak
BN (UMNO)

The Pekan by-election is a parliamentary by-election that was held in February 1976 in the state of Pahang, Malaysia. The Pahang seat fell vacant following the death of its member of parliament, and the Prime Minister of Malaysia, Abdul Razak Hussein of Barisan Nasional (UMNO) in Pahang. Razak won the seat in 1974 Malaysian general election uncontested.

His son, Mohd Najib Abdul Razak of Barisan Nasional won the by election uncontested, as he was the sole nominee during nomination day on 21 September 1976. He became the youngest member of parliament (MP) of Malaysia at that time, at 22 years old. The seat have 22,000 voters.

== Nomination ==
Prior the by-election, Partai Rakyat announced it will not contest the seat. Five independent candidate announced their interest in competing for the seat, along with Najib of Barisan Nasional. They intend to nominate one of them to fight for the seat. However, by the end of nomination day, none of the five appear hence giving the seat to Najib.

== Results ==
Malaysian general by-election, 22 February 1976: Pekan Upon the death of incumbent, Abdul Razak Hussein
Party	Candidate	Votes	%	∆%
On the nomination day, Mohd Najib Abd Razak won uncontested.
BN	Mohd Najib Abd Razak			
Total valid votes			100.00	
Total rejected ballots				
Unreturned ballots				
Turnout				
Registered electors				
Majority				
BN hold		Swing		
