= Zahid Arip =

Malaysian politician

- محمد زاهد بن مت عارڤ

Senator
- In office 16 June 2020 – 15 June 2023
- Monarch: Abdullah
- Prime Minister: Muhyiddin Yassin (2020–2021); Ismail Sabri Yaakob (2021–2022); Anwar Ibrahim (2022–2023)

Political Secretary to the Prime Minister
- In office 2018–2020
- Monarchs: Muhammad V (2018–2019); Abdullah (2019–2020)
- Prime Minister: Mahathir Mohamad

Member of the Supreme Council of the Malaysian United Indigenous Party
- In office 2016–2020
- President: Muhyiddin Yassin
- Chairman: Mahathir Mohamad

Personal details
- Born: Muhammad Zahid bin Md. Arip; 22 June 1966 (age 59) Malacca, Malaysia
- Party: United Malays National Organisation (UMNO) (–2016); Malaysian United Indigenous Party (BERSATU) (since 2016)
- Other political affiliations: Barisan Nasional (BN) (–2016); Pakatan Harapan (PH) (2017–2020); Perikatan Nasional (PN) (since 2020)

Muhammad Zahid bin Md. Arip (born 22 June 1966) is a Malaysian politician who served as a Senator from June 2020 to June 2023 during the tenure of Tan Sri Muhyiddin Yassin as the 8th Prime Minister and also the Political Secretary to the 7th Prime Minister Tun Dr. Mahathir Mohamad from 2018 to 2020. He is a member of the Malaysian United Indigenous Party (BERSATU), a component party of the Perikatan Nasional (PN) and formerly Pakatan Harapan (PH) coalitions and was a member of the United Malays National Organisation (UMNO), a component party of the Barisan Nasional (BN) coalition. He also served as Member of the Supreme Council of BERSATU from 2016 to 2020.

He had also served as a Special Officer to the Federal Land Development Authority (FELDA) Chairman, Tan Sri Mohd Isa Abdul Samad during the tenure of Dato' Sri Mohd Najib Razak as the 6th Prime Minister.

== Family ==
He is the grandnephew of the former Deputy Prime Minister, Tun Abdul Ghafar Baba. His uncle is Admiral Tan Sri Abdul Aziz Jaafar, the 15th Chief of Navy of the Royal Malaysian Navy.

== Politics ==
He was a former United Malays National Organization member before joining United Indigenous Party. After joining United Indigenous Party, he was appointed as a Member of the party's Supreme Leadership Council.

In the general elections in 2018, he contested for the Pekan district, but lost to the incumbent, Dato' Sri Najib Razak.
