= Nazifuddin Najib =

Malaysian businessman

Yang Berbahagia Dato' Nazifuddin Najib DIMP
- نظيف الدين نجيب

Secretary General of the Olympic Council of Malaysia
- Incumbent
- Assumed office 5 May 2018
- President: Mohamad Norza Zakaria
- Preceded by: Low Beng Choo

Personal details
- Born: 13 December 1983 (age 42)
- Relations: Abdul Razak Hussein (grandfather); Rahah Noah (grandmother); Nizar Najib (brother); Onn Hafiz Ghazi (second cousin); Nazir Razak (uncle)
- Parent(s): Najib Razak (father); Puteri Zainah Eskandar (mother)
- Education: American Intercontinental University (BBA); Cass Business School (MBA)
- Occupation: Businessman
- Website: nazifnajib.com

Mohd Nazifuddin bin Mohammad Najib (Jawi: نظيف الدين نجيب, Malay pronunciation: [nazifuddin]; born 13 December 1983) or more commonly known as Nazif Najib, is a Malaysian businessman and son of Najib Razak, a former Prime Minister of Malaysia. He is a member of the United Malays National Organisation (UMNO), a component party of the Barisan Nasional (BN) coalition. He is currently a Member of the Executive Committee (EXCO) of UMNO Youth, as well as the Division Chief of UMNO Langkawi since March 2023.

On 24 July 2019, the government filed a tax evasion lawsuit through the Inland Revenue Board (IRB), against Nazifuddin to claim RM37.6 million in unpaid taxes for the period from 2011 till 2017. On 18 May 2021, he was served with a bankruptcy notice following his failure to pay RM37.6 million in taxes owed to the IRB.

== Early life and education ==
He started a degree in computer science at the University of Nottingham, but soon changed to study international business at American Intercontinental University in 2002, where he obtained a bachelor's degree. He then enrolled at Cass Business School at City University where he graduated with a Masters in Business Administration (MBA).

== Controversies and issues ==
=== Panama Papers ===
Nazifuddin has been named in the Panama Papers, and has responded that he is no longer involved in the two companies involved in the data leak.

Nazifuddin further stated, "I held directorships in two companies based in the British Virgin Islands (BVI): Jay Marriot International and PCJ International Venture Limited. These companies were incorporated by the international law firm Mossack Fonseca," and that he had transferred all of his Jay Marriot shares to fellow director Ch'ng Soon Sen's sister and had resigned in 2011, and that PCJ was shut down a year after its 2013 foundation and had had no business transactions.

=== Wining and dining with Taiwanese actress in Taipei ===
On 5 July 2018, Nazifuddin had set social media on fire after he was spotted wining and dining Taiwanese actress Celia Chang in Taipei. Taiwanese portal Apple Daily said the pair were seen dining at a steakhouse and having a massage at a top luxury shopping district near Taipei 101.

DAP's Iskandar Puteri MP Lim Kit Siang has weighed into Nazifuddin wining and dining with Celia Zhang.

Despite much ink being spilled over Nazifuddin’s Taiwan visit a day after Najib’s four corruption charges in Kuala Lumpur, the most important question seemed to have been missed, i.e. what was Nazifuddin doing in Taiwan and what was his most important agenda in his quick one-day trip to Taiwan – as very few would believe that the whole purpose of Nazifuddin’s quick one-day trip to Taiwan as just to have a rendezvous of wine and food with Celia.

Only Nazifuddin can answer this question. Will he do so?

— Lim Kit Siang

Pemantau Malaysia Baru president Lokman Noor Adam said it is the prerogative of Nazifuddin as a private person to travel to Taiwan.

On 15 July 2018, Nazifuddin watching the World Cup final in Moscow has once again sparked controversy.

=== RM37.6 million in unpaid taxes ===
On 24 July 2019, the government had filed a tax evasion lawsuit through the Inland Revenue Board (IRB), against Nazifuddin to claim RM37.6 million in unpaid taxes since 2011 till 2017.

On 2 March 2020, Nazifuddin failed to obtain a stay on the RM37.6 million tax suit against him.

On 6 July 2020, the High Court has allowed an application for summary judgment to be entered in the IRB suit to recover RM37.6 million in unpaid taxes from Nazifuddin.

On 18 May 2021, he has been served with a bankruptcy notice following his failure to pay RM37.6 million in taxes he owes the Inland Revenue Board (IRB).

On 16 October 2023, the Federal Court ruled Nazifuddin and Najib need to settle RM37.6 million and RM1.69 billion in unpaid taxes and penalties respectively.

== Honours ==
=== Honours of Malaysia ===
- Pahang
  - Knight Companion of the Order of the Crown of Pahang (DIMP) – Dato' (2015)
