= Sh Mohmed Puzi Sh Ali =

Malaysian politician

Yang Berhormat Dato' Sri Sh Mohmed Puzi Sh Ali SSAP DJMK DSAP MP
- سه محمد ڤوزي سه علي

Member of the Malaysian Parliament for Pekan
- Incumbent
- Assumed office 19 November 2022
- Preceded by: Najib Razak (BN–UMNO)
- Majority: 8,949 (2022)

Member of the Pahang State Legislative Assembly for Peramu Jaya
- In office 5 May 2013 – 19 November 2022
- Preceded by: Ibrahim Awang Ismail (BN–UMNO)
- Succeeded by: Nizar Najib (BN–UMNO)
- Majority: 7,627 (2013); 7,182 (2018)

Personal details
- Born: 27 April 1957 (age 69) Pekan, Pahang, Malaysia
- Citizenship: Malaysia
- Party: United Malays National Organisation (UMNO)
- Other political affiliations: Barisan Nasional (BN)
- Occupation: Politician

Sh Mohmed Puzi bin Sh Ali (Jawi: سه محمد ڤوزي بن سه علي, born 27 April 1957) is a Malaysian politician who has served as the Member of Parliament (MP) for Pekan, Pahang since November 2022. He is a member of the United Malays National Organisation (UMNO) a component party of the ruling BN coalition. He has served as Chairman of University of Kuala Lumpur since November 2023.

He is the second MP after Mohamed Amin Daud from Pekan since 1982 not from the Razak family, as Najib Razak (1976-1982 and 1986–2022) and his father Abdul Razak Hussein (1959-1976) has hold the seat for six decades.

== Election results ==
Parliament of Malaysia
| Year | Constituency | | Votes | Pct | Opponent(s) | Votes | Pct | Ballots cast | Majority | Turnout |
|---|---|---|---|---|---|---|---|---|---|---|
| 2022 | P085 Pekan | Sh Mohmed Puzi Sh Ali (UMNO) | 47,418 | 50.96% | Mohd Fadhil Noor Abdul Karim (PAS) | 38,469 | 41.35% | 93,041 | 8,849 | 77.90% |
| 2022 | P085 Pekan | Sh Mohmed Puzi Sh Ali (UMNO) | 47,418 | 50.96% | Mohd Naim Zainal Abidin (PKR) | 6,316 | 6.79% | 93,041 | 8,849 | 77.90% |
| 2022 | P085 Pekan | Sh Mohmed Puzi Sh Ali (UMNO) | 47,418 | 50.96% | Mohammad Radhi Abdul Razak (PEJUANG) | 472 | 0.51% | 93,041 | 8,849 | 77.90% |
| 2022 | P085 Pekan | Sh Mohmed Puzi Sh Ali (UMNO) | 47,418 | 50.96% | Tengku Zainul Hisham Tengku Hussin (Independent) | 366 | 0.39% | 93,041 | 8,849 | 77.90% |

== Honours ==
=== Honours of Malaysia ===
- Malaysia
  - Recipient of the 17th Yang di-Pertuan Agong Installation Medal (2024)
- Kelantan
  - Knight Commander of the Order of the Life of the Crown of Kelantan (DJMK) – Dato' (2010)
- Pahang
  - Grand Knight of the Order of Sultan Ahmad Shah of Pahang (SSAP) – Dato' Sri (2013)
  - Knight Companion of the Order of Sultan Ahmad Shah of Pahang (DSAP) – Dato' (2013)
