= Nizar Najib =

Malaysian politician

Yang Berhormat Orang Kaya Indera Shahbandar Dato' Nizar Najib DSAP MLA
- نذار نجيب

Member of the Pahang State Executive Council (Investment, Industry, Science, Technology and Innovation : since 14 December 2022) (Note: Assumed portfolios 12 days after taking office.)
- Incumbent
- Assumed office 2 December 2022
- Monarch: Abdullah
- Menteri Besar: Wan Rosdy Wan Ismail
- Preceded by: Wan Rosdy Wan Ismail (Investment & Industry); Mohd. Fakhruddin Mohd. Arif (Science)
- Constituency: Peramu Jaya

Member of the Pahang State Legislative Assembly for Peramu Jaya
- Incumbent
- Assumed office 19 November 2022
- Preceded by: Sh Mohmed Puzi Sh Ali (BN–UMNO)
- Majority: 7,823 (2022)

Personal details
- Born: Mohamad Nizar bin Mohamad Najib; 11 May 1978 (age 48)
- Party: United Malays National Organisation (UMNO)
- Other political affiliations: Barisan Nasional (BN); Pakatan Harapan (PH) (aligned:since 2022)
- Parents: Najib Razak (father); Tengku Puteri Zainah Tengku Eskandar (mother)
- Relatives: Nazifuddin Najib (brother); Abdul Razak Hussein (grandfather); Rahah Noah (grandmother); Nazir Razak (uncle); Onn Hafiz Ghazi (second cousin); Hussein Onn (great-uncle); Suhailah Noah (great-aunt); Hishammuddin Hussein (uncle; first cousin once removed); Mohamed Noah Omar (great-grandfather)
- Education: St. John's Institution; Malay College Kuala Kangsar; Oundle School
- Alma mater: University of Nottingham (BA)

Mohamad Nizar bin Mohamad Najib (born 11 May 1978) is a Malaysian politician who has served as Member of the Pahang State Executive Council (EXCO) in the Barisan Nasional (BN) state administration under Menteri Besar Wan Rosdy Wan Ismail since December 2022 and Member of the Pahang State Legislative Assembly (MLA) for Peramu Jaya since November 2022. He is a member of the United Malays National Organisation (UMNO), a component party of the BN coalition.

== Early life and education ==
Nizar is the son of the sixth Prime Minister of Malaysia, Najib Razak with his first wife, Tengku Puteri Zainah Tengku Eskandar. He is the eldest of five siblings, including the two children of Najib's second wife, Rosmah Mansor. Both of his siblings are currently active in politics, with his younger brother Nazifuddin Najib who is the Division Chief of Langkawi division and a UMNO Youth National EXCO member. While his half-sister, Noryana Najib, is an UMNO Women Youth National EXCO member.

Nizar's early education was at St. John's Institution where he finished his Penilaian Menengah Rendah (PMR), and later moved to the Malay College Kuala Kangsar (MCKK). After finishing his schooling years, he was then educated in the UK, where he completed his A-Levels at the Oundle School in Peterborough and then continued for his degree in industrial economics at the University of Nottingham, following in the footsteps of his father, who is an alumnus at Nottingham.

== Early career ==
Nizar is a chartered accountant under the Institute of Chartered Accountants in England and Wales (ICAEW). He has worked as a consultant and accountant, where he started his career at Accenture as an analyst. Nizar then worked at Deloitte for 14 years, where his last corporate role was as an executive director specializing in financial advisory services (FAS).

== Political career ==
Nizar's early entry into politics was as an UMNO Youth Chief of Jalan Daud Branch, Kampung Baru within the Titiwangsa division, led by the current UMNO Vice President Johari Abdul Ghani. In 2018, Nizar became the UMNO Youth Chief of Pekan, a peerage division led by his family for the past 6 decades, including his grandfather Abdul Razak Hussein, and his father Najib Razak who were both ex-prime ministers of Malaysia. Currently, he sits as the Vice Division Chief of Pekan.

Nizar was first coined as a potential Barisan Nasional candidate of the 2020 Chini by-election, before the party decided to nominate Mohd Sharim Md Zain. In the 2022 Malaysian general election, after speculation that Nizar might be contesting his first election in Pekan in place of his father, who has recently sentenced to jail, he instead were selected by his party to contest the state seat of Peramu Jaya in the 2022 Pahang state election. He won the seat, defeating 3 other candidates with a majority of 7,823 votes.

In the Pahang coalition government between BN and Pakatan Harapan after the 2022 election, Nizar was appointed state EXCO member under portfolio of investment, industries, science, technology and innovation.

== Personal life ==
Nizar resides in Jalan Maktab, Kuala Lumpur. He is married to Nur Sharmila Shaheen, the daughter of UMNO Women National EXCO member Maznah Hamid in 2004, with five children.

== Controversies ==
On 18 November 2020, Nizar was ordered to pay RM13.16 million in unpaid taxes from 2011 to the Malaysia Inland Revenue Board by the Shah Alam High Court.

== Election results ==
Pahang State Legislative Assembly
Year	Constituency	Candidate	Votes	Pct	Opponent(s)	Votes	Pct	Ballots cast	Majority	Turnout
2022	N21 Peramu Jaya	Mohamad Nizar Mohamad Najib (UMNO)	19,337	57.63%	Abu Talib Mohamad (BERSATU)	11,514	34.31%	33,555	7,823	81.00%
2022	N21 Peramu Jaya	Mohamad Nizar Mohamad Najib (UMNO)	19,337	57.63%	Tugimon Abdul Hamid (AMANAH)	2,511	7.48%	33,555	7,823	81.00%
2022	N21 Peramu Jaya	Mohamad Nizar Mohamad Najib (UMNO)	19,337	57.63%	Tengku Zainul Hisham Tengku Hisham (Independent)	193	0.58%	33,555	7,823	81.00%

== Honours ==
=== Honours of Malaysia ===
- Pahang
  - Knight Companion of the Order of Sultan Ahmad Shah of Pahang (DSAP) – Dato' (2015)
  - Title of the Four Richest People of Pahang - Orang Kaya Indera Shahbandar (2026)
