= Pekan (federal constituency) =

Federal constituency of Pahang, Malaysia

Pekan (P085)
Pahang constituency

Federal constituency
- Legislature: Dewan Rakyat
- MP: Sh Mohmed Puzi Sh Ali; BN
- Constituency created: 1958
- First contested: 1959
- Last contested: 2022

Demographics
- Population (2020): 161,106
- Electors (2022): 119,443
- Area (km²): 3,846
- Pop. density (per km²): 41.9

Pekan is a federal constituency in Pekan District and Kuantan District, Pahang, Malaysia, that has been represented in the Dewan Rakyat since 1959.

The federal constituency was created from parts of the Pahang Timor constituency in the 1958 redistribution and is mandated to return a single member to the Dewan Rakyat under the first past the post voting system.

== Demographics ==
https://live.chinapress.com.my/ge15/parliament/PAHANG

Ethnic breakdown of Pekan's electorate as of 2022
1. Malay (84.9%)
2. Other ethnicities (12.6%)
3. Chinese (1.80%)
4. Indian (0.70%)

As of 2020, Pekan has a population of 161,106 people.

Age breakdown of Pekan's electorate as of 2022
1. 18-20 (7.04%)
2. 21-29 (23.9%)
3. 30-39 (27.0%)
4. 40-49 (17.5%)
5. 50-59 (11.5%)
6. 60-69 (8.51%)
7. 70-79 (3.43%)
8. 80-89 (0.92%)
9. above 90 (0.21%)
Gender breakdown of Pekan's electorate as of 2022
1. Male (50.8%)
2. Female (49.2%)

== History ==
=== Polling districts ===
According to the federal gazette issued on 31 October 2022, the Pekan constituency is divided into 56 polling districts.

State constituency	Polling district	Code	Location
Pulau Manis (N20)	Seri Mahkota	085/20/01	SK Wira
Pulau Manis (N20)	Jaya Gading	085/20/02	SK Jaya Gading
Pulau Manis (N20)	Kampung Seri Damai	085/20/03	SMK Seri Damai
Pulau Manis (N20)	Gudang Rasau	085/20/04	SK Mat Kilau
Pulau Manis (N20)	Pulau Rusa	085/20/05	SK Pulau Rusa
Pulau Manis (N20)	Ganchong	085/20/06	SK Ganchong
Pulau Manis (N20)	Pulau Manis	085/20/07	SK Pulau Manis
Pulau Manis (N20)	Lepar	085/20/08	SK Lepar
Pulau Manis (N20)	Pelak	085/20/09	SK Pelak
Pulau Manis (N20)	Seri Makmur	085/20/10	SK Seri Makmur
Pulau Manis (N20)	Belimbing	085/20/11	SK Belimbing
Peramu Jaya (N21)	Kampung Lamir	085/21/01	Pusat Perpindahan Banjir Kampung Lamir
Peramu Jaya (N21)	Tanah Putih	085/21/02	SMK Dato' Mahmud Mat
Peramu Jaya (N21)	Peramu Jaya	085/21/03	SK Peramu Jaya
Peramu Jaya (N21)	Serandu	085/21/04	SK Serandu
Peramu Jaya (N21)	Kuala Pahang	085/21/05	SJK (C) Yoke Hwa Kuala Pahang
Peramu Jaya (N21)	Kampung Marhum	085/21/06	SK Indera Shahbandar
Peramu Jaya (N21)	Pasir Panjang	085/21/07	SK Pasir Panjang
Peramu Jaya (N21)	Ketapang	085/21/08	SMA Al-Attas
Peramu Jaya (N21)	Sungai Miang	085/21/09	SK Sinar Mutiara
Peramu Jaya (N21)	Bandar Pekan	085/21/10	SK Sultan Ahmad
Peramu Jaya (N21)	Mengkasar	085/21/11	SM Sains Sultan Haji Ahmad Shah Pekan
Peramu Jaya (N21)	Pulau Jawa	085/21/12	SK Sri Maulana
Peramu Jaya (N21)	Kelat Rendang	085/21/13	SMK Peramu Jaya
Peramu Jaya (N21)	Kampung Langgar	085/21/14	SK Langgar
Peramu Jaya (N21)	Pahang Tua	085/21/15	SK Pahang Tua
Peramu Jaya (N21)	Shahbandar	085/21/16	SK Pekan Jaya
Bebar (N22)	Serambi	085/22/01	SK Serambi
Bebar (N22)	Padang Rumbia	085/22/02	SK Padang Rumbia
Bebar (N22)	Temai	085/22/03	SK Temai
Bebar (N22)	Acheh	085/22/04	SK Kampung Acheh
Bebar (N22)	Tanjung Medang	085/22/05	SK Tanjung Medang
Bebar (N22)	Padang Polo	085/22/06	SK Seri Terentang
Bebar (N22)	Tanjung Batu	085/22/07	SK Tanjung Batu
Bebar (N22)	Landai	085/22/08	SK Nenasi
Bebar (N22)	Nenasi	085/22/09	SMK Nenasi
Bebar (N22)	Merchong	085/22/10	SK Merchong Jaya
Bebar (N22)	Api Larat	085/22/11	Dewan Orang Ramai Kampung Api Larat
Bebar (N22)	Sawah Batu	085/22/12	Balai Raya Kampung Sawah Batu
Bebar (N22)	Kota Perdana	085/22/13	SK Kota Perdana
Bebar (N22)	Simpai	085/22/14	SK Simpai
Bebar (N22)	Runchang	085/22/15	SK Runchang
Bebar (N22)	Bandar Dua	085/22/16	SK Bandar 2 Paloh Hinai
Chini (N23)	Terpai	085/23/01	SK Kinchir
Chini (N23)	Salong	085/23/02	Dewan Mempelas Kampung Baru PPSK Salong Mukim Penyor 1
Chini (N23)	Mambang	085/23/03	SK Mambang
Chini (N23)	Paloh Hinai	085/23/04	SMK Paloh Hinai
Chini (N23)	Kampung Dusun	085/23/05	Balai Raya Dan Perpustakaan Desa Kampung Dusun
Chini (N23)	FELDA Chini Timur 3 & 4	085/23/06	SK LKTP Chini Timur 2
Chini (N23)	FELDA Chini Timur 1	085/23/07	SK LKTP Chini Timur 1
Chini (N23)	FELDA Chini Timur 2	085/23/08	SMK Chini Timur
Chini (N23)	FELDA Chini 5	085/23/09	SK LKTP Chini 3 & 5
Chini (N23)	FELDA Chini 4	085/23/10	SK LKTP Chini 1 & 4
Chini (N23)	FELDA Chini 1	085/23/11	SA Rakyat (KAFA) Nur Ilham FELDA Chini 1
Chini (N23)	FELDA Chini 2	085/23/12	SMK Chini 2
Chini (N23)	FELDA Chini 3	085/23/13	KAFA Kelas Al-Quran Dan Fardu Ain FELDA Chini 03; Dewan Semai Bakti Kg. FELDA Chini 3

=== Representation history ===
Members of Parliament for Pekan
Parliament	No	Years	Member	Party	Vote Share
Constituency created from Pahang Timor
Parliament of the Federation of Malaya
1st	P062	1959–1963	Abdul Razak Hussein (عبد الرزاق حسين)	Alliance (UMNO)	8,811; 77.26%
Parliament of Malaysia
1st	P062	1963–1964	Abdul Razak Hussein (عبد الرزاق حسين)	Alliance (UMNO)	8,811; 77.26%
2nd	P062	1964–1969	Abdul Razak Hussein (عبد الرزاق حسين)	Alliance (UMNO)	11,858; 87.39%
		1969–1971	Parliament was suspended		
3rd	P062	1971–1973	Abdul Razak Hussein (عبد الرزاق حسين)	Alliance (UMNO)	12,641; 77.28%
3rd	P062	1973–1974	Abdul Razak Hussein (عبد الرزاق حسين)	BN (UMNO)	12,641; 77.28%
4th	P071	1974–1976	Abdul Razak Hussein (عبد الرزاق حسين)	BN (UMNO)	Uncontested
4th	P071	1976–1978	Mohammad Najib Abdul Razak (محمّد نجيب عبد الرزاق)	BN (UMNO)	Uncontested
5th	P071	1978–1982	Mohammad Najib Abdul Razak (محمّد نجيب عبد الرزاق)	BN (UMNO)	13,876; 76.16%
6th	P071	1982–1986	Mohamed Amin Daud (محمد أمين داود）	BN (UMNO)	18,648; 71.03%
7th	P077	1986–1990	Mohammad Najib Abdul Razak (محمّد نجيب عبد الرزاق)	BN (UMNO)	16,431; 74.50%
8th	P077	1990–1995	Mohammad Najib Abdul Razak (محمّد نجيب عبد الرزاق)	BN (UMNO)	21,262; 66.33%
9th	P080	1995–1999	Mohammad Najib Abdul Razak (محمّد نجيب عبد الرزاق)	BN (UMNO)	17,004; 73.25%
10th	P080	1999–2004	Mohammad Najib Abdul Razak (محمّد نجيب عبد الرزاق)	BN (UMNO)	13,148; 50.46%
11th	P085	2004–2008	Mohammad Najib Abdul Razak (محمّد نجيب عبد الرزاق)	BN (UMNO)	31,956; 77.96%
12th	P085	2008–2013	Mohammad Najib Abdul Razak (محمّد نجيب عبد الرزاق)	BN (UMNO)	36,262; 78.73%
13th	P085	2013–2018	Mohammad Najib Abdul Razak (محمّد نجيب عبد الرزاق)	BN (UMNO)	51,278; 76.60%
14th	P085	2018–2022	Mohammad Najib Abdul Razak (محمّد نجيب عبد الرزاق)	BN (UMNO)	43,854; 62.10%
15th	P085	2022–present	Sh Mohmed Puzi Sh Ali (سه محمد ڤوزي سه علي)	BN (UMNO)	47,418; 50.96%

=== State constituency ===
Parliamentary constituency	State constituency						
Parliamentary constituency	1955–59*	1959–1974	1974–1986	1986–1995	1995–2004	2004–2018	2018–present
Pekan			Bandar Pekan				
Pekan					Bebar		
Pekan			Bukit Ibam				
Pekan			Chini			Chini	
Pekan					Cini		
Pekan		Kuala Pahang					
Pekan		Pahang Tua					
Pekan				Paya Besar			
Pekan				Peramu			
Pekan						Peramu Jaya	
Pekan						Pulau Manis	
Pekan		Rompin					

=== Historical boundaries ===
State Constituency	Area					
State Constituency	1959	1974	1984	1994	2003	2018
Bandar Pekan		Kampung Kalung; Kampung Keledang; Kampung Mengkasar; Pekan; Peramu				
Bebar				FELDA Chini 1-5; FELDA Chini Timur 1-4; Merchong; Nenasi; Temai	Kampung Tanjung Medang Hilir; Kampung Temai; Merchong; Nenasi; Temai	
Bukit Ibam		Bandar Tun Abdul Razak; Bukit Ibam; Keratong; Muadzam Shah; Nenasi				
Chini		Bukit Chini; Ganchong; Kampung Tanjung Menang Hilir; Kampung Temai; Kuala Gumum		Lepar; Kampung Tanah Puteh; Kampung Gumum; Kampung Temai; Kampung Ubai	FELDA Chini 1-5; FELDA Chini Timur 1-4; Kampung Cendahan; Kampung Gumum; Paloh Hinai	
Kuala Pahang	Kampung Batu Putih; Kampung Jalan Tegak; Kuala Pahang; Pekan; Peramu	Kampung Batu Putih; Kampung Jalan Tegak; Kampung Ubai; Kuala Pahang; Taman Mentiga Jaya	Kampung Batu Putih; Kampung Jalan Tegak; Kampung Tanjung Medang Hilir; Kampung Ubai; Kuala Pahang	Kampung Marhum; Kampung Mengkasar; Kuala Pahang; Pekan; Peramu		
Pahang Tua	FELDA Chini 1-5; FELDA Chin Timur 1-4; Sri Jaya; Maran; Paloh Hinai					
Paya Besar			FELDA Sungai Panching Selatan; FELDA Sungai Panching Utara; Gambang; Kemunting; Jaua Gading			
Peramu			Kampung Mengkasar; Kampung Pulau Jawa; Kampung Pulau Tambun; Pekan; Peramu			
Peramu Jaya					Kuala Pahang; Pahang Tua; Pekan; Peramu Jaya; Serandu	
Pulau Manis					Jaya Gading; Pulau Rusa; Pulau Manis; Seri Damai; Seri Mahkota	
Rompin	Bandar Tun Razak; Kuala Rompin; Muadzam Shah; Nenasi; Tanjung Gemok	Kampung Sepakat; Kampung Orang Asli Batu 8; Kuala Rompin; Tanjung Gemok; Tioman				

=== Current state assembly members ===
No.	State Constituency	Member	Coalition (Party)
N20	Pulau Manis	Mohd Rafiq Khan Ahmad Khan	PN (PAS)
N21	Peramu Jaya	Mohamad Nizar Mohamad Najib	BN (UMNO)
N22	Bebar	Mohd. Fakhruddin Mohd. Arif	BN (UMNO)
N23	Chini	Mohd Sharim Md Zain	BN (UMNO)

=== Local governments & postcodes ===
No.	State Constituency	Local Government	Postcode
N20	Pulau Manis	Kuantan City Council (Seri Mahkota and Jaya Gading areas); Pekan Municipal Council	25150, 25500, 25502 Kuantan; 26600, 26610, 26620, 26630, 26640, 26650, 26660, 26680 Pekan; 26690 Chini
N21	Peramu Jaya	Pekan Municipal Council	25150, 25500, 25502 Kuantan; 26600, 26610, 26620, 26630, 26640, 26650, 26660, 26680 Pekan; 26690 Chini
N22	Bebar	Pekan Municipal Council	25150, 25500, 25502 Kuantan; 26600, 26610, 26620, 26630, 26640, 26650, 26660, 26680 Pekan; 26690 Chini
N23	Chini	Pekan Municipal Council	25150, 25500, 25502 Kuantan; 26600, 26610, 26620, 26630, 26640, 26650, 26660, 26680 Pekan; 26690 Chini

== Election results ==
Malaysian general election, 2022
Party	Candidate	Votes	%	∆%
BN	Sh Mohmed Puzi Sh Ali	47,418	50.96	▼11.14
PN	Mohd Fadhil Noor Abdul Karim	38,469	41.35	▲41.35
PH	Mohd Naim Zainal Abidin	6,316	6.79	▼4.06
GTA	Mohammad Radhi Abdul Razak	472	0.51	▲0.51
Independent	Tengku Zainul Hisham Tengku Hussin	366	0.39	▲0.39
Total valid votes		93,041	100.00	
Total rejected ballots		1,350		
Unreturned ballots		227		
Turnout		94,618	77.90	▼3.44
Registered electors		119,443		
Majority		8,949	9.61	▼25.59
BN hold		Swing		
Source(s) https://lom.agc.gov.my/ilims/upload/portal/akta/outputp/1753278/PUB611_2022.pdf

Malaysian general election, 2018
Party	Candidate	Votes	%	∆%
BN	Mohd Najib Abd Razak	43,854	62.10	▼14.50
PAS	Ahiatudin Daud	18,995	26.90	▲26.90
PKR	Muhammad Zahid Md Arip	7,662	10.85	▲10.85
Independent	Abd Kadir Sainudin	103	0.15	▲0.15
Total valid votes		70,614	100.00	
Total rejected ballots		1,393		
Unreturned ballots		301		
Turnout		72,308	81.34	▼3.96
Registered electors		88,899		
Majority		24,859	35.20	▼18.00
BN hold		Swing		
Source(s) "His Majesty's Government Gazette - Notice of Contested Election, Parliament for the State of Pahang [P.U. (B) 238/2018]" (PDF). Attorney General's Chambers of Malaysia. 3 May 2018. "Federal Government Gazette - Results of Contested Election and Statements of the Poll after the Official Addition of Votes, Parliamentary Constituencies for the State of Pahang [P.U. (B) 312/2018]" (PDF). Attorney General's Chambers of Malaysia. 28 May 2018.

Malaysian general election, 2013
Party	Candidate	Votes	%	∆%
BN	Mohd Najib Abd Razak	51,278	76.60	▼2.13
PKR	Mohd. Fariz Abd. Talib @ Musa	15,665	23.40	▲2.13
Total valid votes		66,943	100.00	
Total rejected ballots		1,275		
Unreturned ballots		246		
Turnout		68,464	85.30	▲3.07
Registered electors		80,260		
Majority		35,613	53.20	▼4.26
BN hold		Swing		
Source(s) "Federal Government Gazette - Notice of Contested Election, Parliament for the State of Pahang [P.U. (B) 175/2013]" (PDF). Attorney General's Chambers of Malaysia. 26 April 2013. "Federal Government Gazette - Results of Contested Election and Statements of the Poll after the Official Addition of Votes, Parliamentary Constituencies for the State of Pahang [P.U. (B) 216/2013]" (PDF). Attorney General's Chambers of Malaysia. 22 May 2013. Archived from the original (PDF) on 1 July 2019.

Malaysian general election, 2008
Party	Candidate	Votes	%	∆%
BN	Mohd Najib Abd Razak	36,262	78.73	▲0.77
PKR	Khairul Anuar Ahmad Zainudin	9,798	21.27	▲21.27
Total valid votes		46,060	100.00	
Total rejected ballots		1,261		
Unreturned ballots		549		
Turnout		47,870	82.23	▲4.31
Registered electors		58,217		
Majority		26,464	57.46	▲1.54
BN hold		Swing		

Malaysian general election, 2004
Party	Candidate	Votes	%	∆%
BN	Mohd Najib Abd Razak	31,956	77.96	▲27.50
PAS	Zakaria Dahlan	9,034	22.04	▼27.50
Total valid votes		40,990	100.00	
Total rejected ballots		56		
Unreturned ballots		0		
Turnout		41,046	77.91	▼3.13
Registered electors		52,683		
Majority		22,922	55.92	▲55.00
BN hold		Swing		

Malaysian general election, 1999
Party	Candidate	Votes	%	∆%
BN	Mohd Najib Abd Razak	13,148	50.46	▼22.79
PAS	Ramli Mohamed	12,907	49.54	▲49.54
Total valid votes		26,055	100.00	
Total rejected ballots		631		
Unreturned ballots		111		
Turnout		26,797	74.78	▲3.18
Registered electors		35,834		
Majority		241	0.92	▼45.58
BN hold		Swing		

Malaysian general election, 1995
Party	Candidate	Votes	%	∆%
BN	Mohd Najib Abd Razak	17,004	73.25	▲6.92
S46	M. Samueil Mohamad Kameil	6,211	26.75	▼6.92
Total valid votes		23,215	100.00	
Total rejected ballots		1,127		
Unreturned ballots		223		
Turnout		24,565	71.60	▲0.24
Registered electors		34,308		
Majority		10,793	46.50	▲13.84
BN hold		Swing		

Malaysian general election, 1990
Party	Candidate	Votes	%	∆%
BN	Mohd Najib Abd Razak	21,262	66.33	▼8.17
S46	Othman Hitam	10,795	33.67	▲33.67
Total valid votes		32,057	100.00	
Total rejected ballots		1,357		
Unreturned ballots		0		
Turnout		33,414	71.36	▲4.49
Registered electors		46,823		
Majority		10,467	32.66	▼16.34
BN hold		Swing		

Malaysian general election, 1986
Party	Candidate	Votes	%	∆%
BN	Mohd Najib Abd Razak	16,431	74.50	▲3.47
PAS	Ali Abdullah @ Lee Kin Hong	5,623	25.50	▲3.47
Total valid votes		22,054	100.00	
Total rejected ballots		694		
Unreturned ballots		0		
Turnout		22,748	66.87	▼4.59
Registered electors		34,017		
Majority		10,808	49.00	▲6.94
BN hold		Swing		

Malaysian general election, 1982
Party	Candidate	Votes	%	∆%
BN	Mohamed Amin Daud	18,648	71.03	▼5.13
PAS	Mohamed Rusdi Arif	7,604	28.97	▲5.13
Total valid votes		26,252	100.00	
Total rejected ballots		1,090		
Unreturned ballots		0		
Turnout		27,342	71.46	▲0.49
Registered electors		38,260		
Majority		11,044	42.06	▼10.26
BN hold		Swing		

Malaysian general election, 1978
Party	Candidate	Votes	%	∆%
BN	Mohd Najib Abd Razak	13,876	76.16	▲76.16
PAS	Mohamed Rusdi Arif	4,343	23.84	▲23.84
Total valid votes		18,219	100.00	
Total rejected ballots		815		
Unreturned ballots		0		
Turnout		19,034	70.97	
Registered electors		26,819		
Majority		9,533	52.32	
BN hold		Swing		

Malaysian general by-election, 21 February 1976 The by-election was called due to the death of incumbent, Abdul Razak Hussein.
Party	Candidate	Votes	%	∆%
On the nomination day, Najib Razak won uncontested.
BN	Mohd Najib Abd Razak			
Total valid votes			100.00	
Total rejected ballots				
Unreturned ballots				
Turnout				
Registered electors				
Majority				
BN hold		Swing		

Malaysian general election, 1974
Party	Candidate	Votes	%	∆%
On the nomination day, Abdul Razak Hussein won uncontested.
BN	Abdul Razak Hussein			
Total valid votes			100.00	
Total rejected ballots				
Unreturned ballots				
Turnout				
Registered electors		22,957		
Majority				
BN gain from Alliance		Swing		?

Malaysian general election, 1969
Party	Candidate	Votes	%	∆%
Alliance	Abdul Razak Hussein	12,641	77.28	▼10.11
PMIP	Yazid Jaafar	3,716	22.72	▲10.11
Total valid votes		16,357	100.00	
Total rejected ballots		488		
Unreturned ballots		0		
Turnout		16,845	71.24	▼5.39
Registered electors		23,644		
Majority		8,925	54.56	▼20.22
Alliance hold		Swing		

Malaysian general election, 1964
Party	Candidate	Votes	%	∆%
Alliance	Abdul Razak Hussein	11,858	87.39	▲10.13
PMIP	Abdul Hamid Awang Hitam	1,711	12.61	▼10.13
Total valid votes		13,569	100.00	
Total rejected ballots		596		
Unreturned ballots		0		
Turnout		14,165	76.63	▲2.11
Registered electors		18,486		
Majority		10,147	74.78	▲20.26
Alliance hold		Swing		

Malayan general election, 1959
Party	Candidate	Votes	%
Alliance	Abdul Razak Hussein	8,811	77.26
PMIP	Mohamed Ariff Abas	2,593	22.74
Total valid votes		11,404	100.00
Total rejected ballots		104	
Unreturned ballots		0	
Turnout		11,508	74.52
Registered electors		15,443	
Majority		6,218	54.52
This was a new constituency created out of Pahang Timor which went to Alliance in the previous election.
