= Najib Razak =

Prime Minister of Malaysia from 2009 to 2018

Yang Berbahagia Dato' Sri Najib Razak DK II (Pahang) DK I (Brunei) SPMK DMK SSSJ SPSA SSAP SIMP SPDK DUNM DP DSAP PNBS
- نجيب رزاق
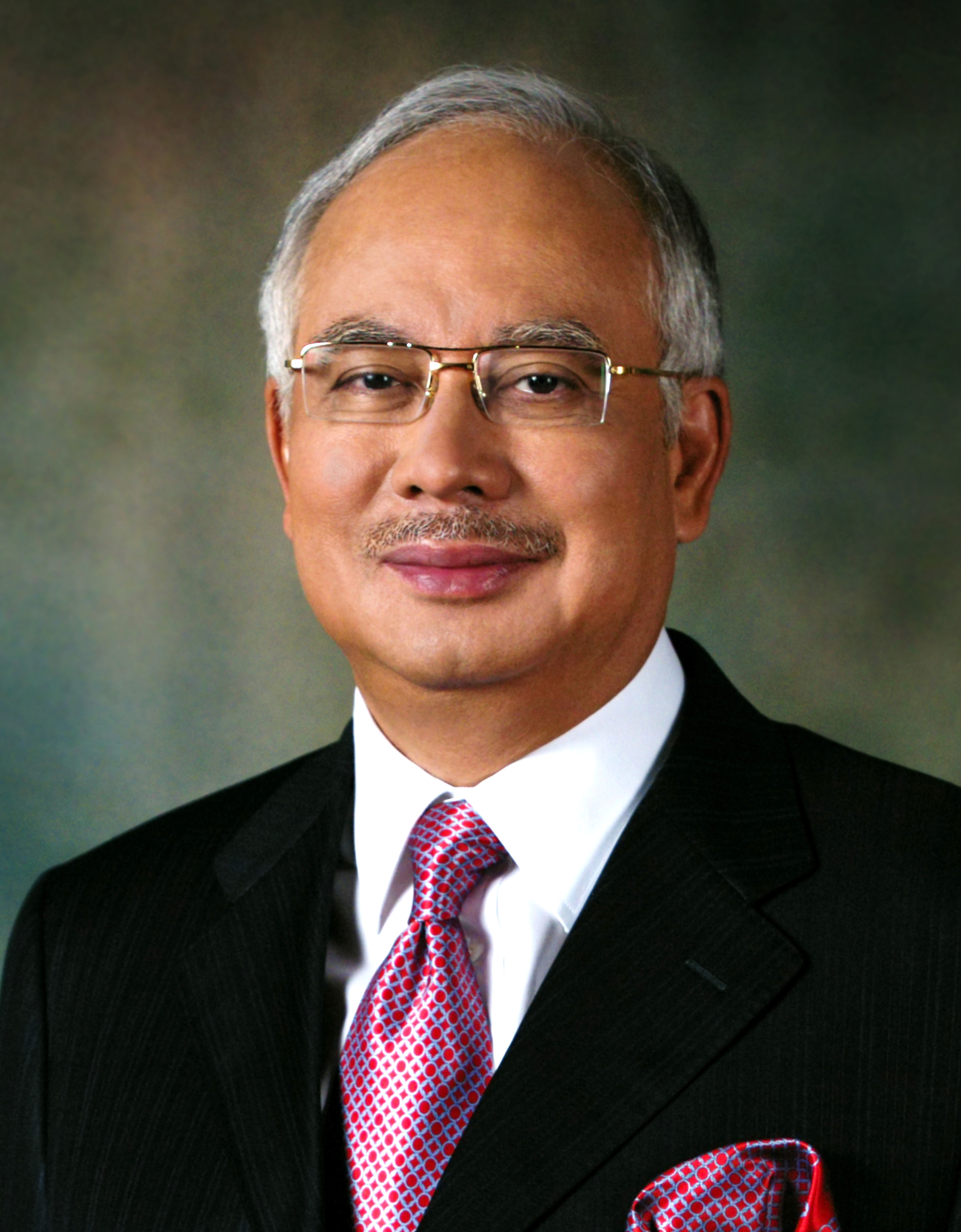
- Official portrait, 2008

6th Prime Minister of Malaysia
- In office 3 April 2009 – 9 May 2018
- Monarchs: Mizan Zainal Abidin; Abdul Halim; Muhammad V
- Deputy: Muhyiddin Yassin; Ahmad Zahid Hamidi
- Preceded by: Abdullah Ahmad Badawi
- Succeeded by: Mahathir Mohamad

7th President of the United Malays National Organisation (ex officio: Chairman of Barisan Nasional)
- In office 26 March 2009 – 12 May 2018
- Deputy: Muhyiddin Yassin; Ahmad Zahid Hamidi
- Preceded by: Abdullah Ahmad Badawi
- Succeeded by: Ahmad Zahid Hamidi

9th Deputy Prime Minister of Malaysia
- In office 7 January 2004 – 3 April 2009
- Prime Minister: Abdullah Ahmad Badawi
- Preceded by: Abdullah Ahmad Badawi
- Succeeded by: Muhyiddin Yassin

12th Menteri Besar of Pahang
- In office 4 May 1982 – 14 August 1986
- Monarch: Ahmad Shah
- Deputy: Abdul Rashid Abdul Rahman
- Preceded by: Abdul Rashid Abdul Rahman
- Succeeded by: Mohd Khalil Yaakob
Ministerial portfolios
1978–1979	Deputy Minister of Energy, Telecommunications and Posts
1979–1981	Deputy Minister of Education
1981–1982	Deputy Minister of Finance
1986–1987	Minister of Culture, Youth and Sports
1987–1990	Minister of Youth and Sports
1990–1995	Minister of Defence
1995–1999	Minister of Education
1999–2008	Minister of Defence
2008–2018	Minister of Finance
2012–2013	Acting Minister of Women, Family and Community Development
Parliamentary offices
Member of the Malaysian Parliament for Pekan
In office 6 October 1986 – 6 September 2022
Preceded by	Mohamed Amin Daud
Succeeded by	Sh Mohmed Puzi Sh Ali
In office 21 February 1976 – 14 June 1982
Preceded by	Abdul Razak Hussein
Succeeded by	Mohamed Amin Daud
Member of the Pahang State Legislative Assembly for Bandar Pekan
In office 1982–1986
Preceded by	Shamsiah Abdul Hamid
Succeeded by	Constituency abolished

Personal details
- Born: Mohammad Najib bin Abdul Razak; 23 July 1953 (age 73) Kuala Lipis, Pahang, Federation of Malaya
- Citizenship: Malaysia
- Party: United Malays National Organisation (UMNO) (1976–present)
- Other political affiliations: Barisan Nasional (BN) (1976–present)
- Spouses: Tengku Puteri Zainah Eskandar (m. 1976; div. 1987); Rosmah Mansor (m. 1987)
- Children: 5 (including Nazifuddin and Nizar)
- Parents: Abdul Razak Hussein (father); Rahah Noah (mother)
- Relatives: Hishammuddin Hussein (cousin); Riza Aziz (stepson); Hussein bin Mohd Taib (grandfather); Mohamed Noah Omar (grandfather); Suhailah Noah (aunt); Onn Hafiz Ghazi (first cousin once removed)
- Education: University of Nottingham (BSc)

Najib Razak

Faction represented in Dewan Rakyat
- 1976–1982: Barisan Nasional
- 1986–2022: Barisan Nasional

Faction represented in Pahang State Legislative Assembly
- 1982–1986: Barisan Nasional

Mohammad Najib bin Abdul Razak (Jawi: محمد نجيب بن عبد الرزاق, Malay: [nadʒep̚ razaʔ]; born 23 July 1953) is a Malaysian politician who served as the sixth prime minister of Malaysia from 2009 to 2018. He is the son of former prime minister Abdul Razak Hussein. Najib served as the chairman of the Barisan Nasional (BN) coalition from April 2009 to May 2018 and as the president of the United Malays National Organisation (UMNO) from November 2008 to May 2018.

The coalition experienced an unprecedented defeat in the 2018 general election, attributed to corruption charges involving Najib and his family, which eroded public trust in the ruling party. The introduction of the Goods and Services Tax, widely regarded as unpopular, also significantly contributed to the decline in support. In 2020, he was convicted of corruption in the 1Malaysia Development Berhad scandal, one of the largest money-laundering and embezzlement scandals in history.

Najib was elected to the Parliament of Malaysia in 1976, at the age of 23, replacing his deceased father in the Pahang-based seat of Pekan. In the same year, he was appointed the head of UMNO Youth's Pekan branch and became a member of the youth wing's Executive Council. In the early years of his political career, Najib took on a deputy minister role in 1976, and between 1982 and 1986, he was the Menteri Besar of Pahang. Thereafter, until 2009, he was rotated throughout the Cabinet of Malaysia, taking on various ministerial portfolios in defence, education, culture, youth and sports, and finally finance. Between 1993 and 2009, Najib was a vice-president of UMNO. During his tenure as deputy prime minister, he was accused of being involved in the 2006 Altantuya Shaariibuu murder case, but he denied any involvement in the case.

Najib's tenure as prime minister, between 2009 and 2018, was marked by economic liberalisation measures, such as cuts to government subsidies, which were unpopular among the public. After the 2013 election, his government pursued a number of its critics on sedition charges, saw the imprisonment of opposition leader Anwar Ibrahim following a conviction for sodomy, and the implementation of a Goods and Services Tax (GST). He was prime minister during the Malaysia Airlines Flight 370 disaster and a dispute with North Korea following the assassination of Kim Jong-nam.

In 2015, Najib became implicated in a major corruption scandal involving state investment firm 1Malaysia Development Berhad (1MDB) which led to rallies calling for his resignation, spearheaded by the grassroots movement Bersih. These protests culminated in the Malaysian Citizens' Declaration by Mahathir Mohamad, Pakatan Harapan and non-governmental organisations that sought to oust Najib.

Najib's response to the corruption accusations was to tighten his grip on power by replacing then-deputy prime minister Muhyiddin Yassin, suspending two newspapers and pushing through parliament a controversial National Security Council Bill that provided the prime minister with unprecedented powers. Najib's various subsidy cuts have contributed to soaring living costs, while fluctuating oil prices and the fallout from the 1MDB scandal led to a depreciation of the Malaysian currency. These ended with BN's historic loss in the 2018 general elections; the coalition had ruled uninterrupted since Malayan independence in 1957. Najib then conceded defeat and promised to help facilitate a smooth transition of power.

On 3 July 2018, Najib was arrested by the Malaysian Anti-Corruption Commission (MACC), which had been investigating how RM42 million (US$10.6 million) went from SRC International, a company related to 1MDB, into Najib's bank account. In the process, the police seized a number of fashion accessories worth $273 million while searching through his properties. Najib was subsequently charged and convicted by the High Court on abuse of power, money laundering and criminal breach of trust, becoming the first Prime Minister of Malaysia to be convicted of corruption, and was sentenced to 12 years' imprisonment and fined RM210 million. At the same time, Najib was also simultaneously directed to settle RM1.69 billion in tax arrears owed to the Inland Revenue Board (IRB). The sentence was upheld by the Federal Court on 23 August 2022. He served his sentence at Kajang Prison for four years, and continued under house arrest after being granted a royal pardon.

== Early life and education ==
Najib was born on 23 July 1953 at the Pahang State Secretary official residence in Bukit Bius, Kuala Lipis, Pahang. Najib is the eldest of second Malaysian Prime Minister Abdul Razak's six sons. His younger brother, Mohd Nazir Abdul Razak, runs the country's second-largest lender, Bumiputra-Commerce Holdings Bhd. Najib is also one of the Four Noblemen of the Pahang Darul Makmur (Royal Court) by virtue of his inherited title as the Orang Kaya Indera Shahbandar. He received his primary and secondary education at St. John's Institution, Kuala Lumpur. He later attended Malvern College in Worcestershire, England, and subsequently went to the University of Nottingham, where he received a bachelor's degree in industrial economics in 1974. Najib Razak returned to Malaysia in 1974 and entered the business world, serving briefly at Bank Negara Malaysia and later with Petronas (Malaysia's national oil company) as a public affairs manager.

== Early political career (1976–1991) ==
The eldest son of Malaysian Prime Minister, Abdul Razak Hussein, he was elected to the Parliament of Malaysia in 1976 replacing his deceased father in the Pahang-based seat of Pekan. The national outpouring of grief following Abdul Razak's death and the respect for his father helped Najib win election unopposed as Member of Parliament at the very young age of 23. In 1986 Najib won re-election to the same seat.

Najib was appointed head of UMNO Youth's Pekan branch and became a member of UMNO Youth's Executive Council (Exco) in 1976. In 1981, he was selected as a member of UMNO's Supreme Council, before winning the post of Vice-President of UMNO Youth in 1982.

Najib was first assigned into the Cabinet of Malaysia at the age of 25 when he was appointed Deputy Minister of Energy, Telecommunications and Post in 1978, becoming the youngest deputy minister in the country. He served as the Menteri Besar of Pahang between 1982 and 1986, becoming the youngest Menteri Besar in the state to enter office when he was sworn in at the age of 29. In 1986 he was appointed as Minister of Culture, Youth and Sports in the cabinet of Mahathir Mohamad. He focused on improving Malaysian sports and introduced the National Sports Policy in 1988. In 1989 Malaysia achieved its best-ever performance at the South East Asia (SEA) Games, held in Kuala Lumpur.

In 1987, Najib was selected as the acting head of the Movement of UMNO Youth by Dato' Seri Anwar Ibrahim after Anwar was asked to contest the post of UMNO Vice-President. Following mounting ethnic tensions, anti-Chinese sentiments were expressed at an UMNO Youth rally held in Kampung Baru, Kuala Lumpur. Fears of ethnic violence eventually resulted in a security operation known as Operasi Lalang which included numerous administrative detentions.

Following the reorganisation and founding the "New" UMNO by Mahathir Mohamad in the aftermath of the 1988 Malaysian constitutional crisis, Najib was appointed president of UMNO Youth in 1988.

== Senior ministerial career (1991–2009) ==
=== Minister for defence (1991–1995) ===
In 1991, Mahathir appointed Najib as Minister of Defence. Under Najib's direction, Malaysian troops were deployed to assist the UN peacekeeping forces in Bosnia in 1993 during the Bosnian War. Malaysian forces were greeted warmly by Bosnians as well as Serbs and Croats. Malaysia also assisted peacekeeping operations in Somalia in 1993, losing one soldier in an effort to aid US soldiers during the Battle of Mogadishu. Najib later criticised the UN's Somalia operation as putting too much emphasis on military action. Since then Malaysia has stated a preference for participating in Chapter 6 "peace enforcement" missions, rather than Chapter 7 "peacekeeping" missions. After four years at the Ministry of Defence, Najib assumed control of the Education Ministry in 1995.

By 1993, Najib was one of six vice-presidents of UMNO after Anwar's decision to contest for the deputy presidency of UMNO. Najib continued to defend his post in party elections held in 1993, 1996, and 2004.

As an UMNO leader, Najib Razak blocked attempts by other UMNO members such as Mustapha Yakub to request Japan apologise and provide compensation for the forced prostitution its soldiers engaged in during its occupation of Malaya and of British Borneo, the victims of which came to be known as comfort women.

=== Minister for education (1995–2000) ===
In 1995, Najib left the Defence Ministry for the first time when he was appointed Minister of Education. His challenge was to respond to Malaysia's newly proclaimed aspiration to become a fully developed nation by 2020. The 1996 Private Higher Education Institutions Act allowed foreign universities to establish degree-conferring schools in Malaysia, providing greater educational opportunities for Malaysians and positioning Malaysia as a regional learning hub.

During the 1999 general elections Najib was returned to parliament with a narrow majority of just 241 votes, compared to over 10,000 in the previous election.

=== Return as minister for defence (2000–2008) ===
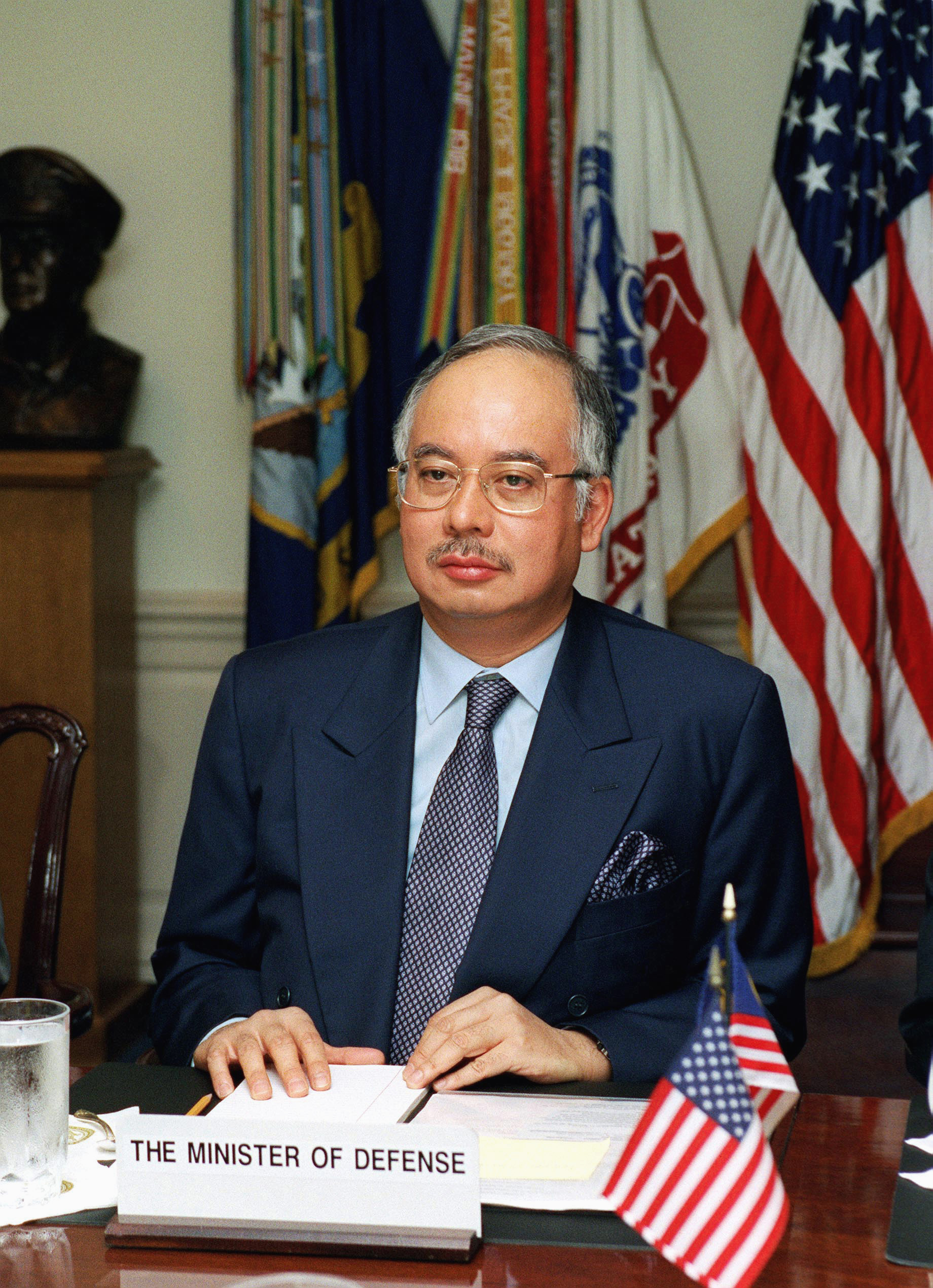
Najib at The Pentagon in 2002

During his second tenure as Minister of Defence, Najib coordinated Malaysia's relief efforts following the Indian Ocean tsunami of 2004, and provided support to Indonesia in arresting those responsible for the 2005 Bali bombings. Najib also oversaw the deployment of Malaysian troops as a part of a UN peacekeeping force in 2006, when Malaysia volunteered to help stabilise Lebanon following the 2006 Lebanon War.

As defence minister, Najib instituted compulsory military service in December 2003, stating that it would encourage interaction and friendship between youth of different ethnic groups and religions. During its first five years of operation, over 339,000 Malaysian youth participated in the PLKN (the Bahasa Malaysia acronym for "Malaysian National Service"), which was intended to promote tolerance, teamwork, and community engagement. The programme, however, faced numerous challenges. Safety issues in the program were reported and several people died during or shortly after their terms of service during the program's first few years. In response, Najib strengthened the PLKN's health screening requirements and reinforced the government's commitment to punish negligent PLKN officials.

==== The Altantuyaa affair ====
French courts investigated allegations of corruption in the purchases of two Scorpène-class submarines, by the Malaysian Ministry of Defence in 2002, at a time when Najib was the minister of defence. The allegations were that Abdul Razak Baginda, an aide of Najib, received "commission" payments from the French submarine builder DCNS. Shaariibuugiin Altantuyaa, a Mongolian woman hired as a French translator to facilitate the purchase of the submarines and mistress to Baginda, tried to blackmail Baginda for a $500,000 cut and was subsequently murdered. 2 policemen, who were bodyguards posted to Najib, were charged and found guilty. Reviewing the Altantuyaa case, Tommy Thomas, Attorney General of Malaysia from 2018 to 2020, wrote that the evidence "implicated not only Najib Razak as the person who gave [one of the bodyguards] the order to kill, but also his aide-de-camp, Musa Safri".

=== Deputy prime minister (2004–2009) ===
In 2004, Mahathir retired and was replaced by his deputy, Abdullah Ahmad Badawi. Najib became Deputy Prime Minister and was given a broad portfolio of responsibilities, including oversight of FELDA, the Human Rights Commission (SUHAKAM), and the Election Commission (EC). Najib also chaired more than 28 cabinet committees. He remained as Minister for Defence.

In September 2008, Najib became the Minister for Finance, handing the Defence portfolio to Badawi. During the 2008 financial crisis, Malaysia faced a strong recession and reduced levels of trade throughout the South Asian region. In response, Najib announced a series of stimulus packages to be implemented over a two-year period with the intention of acting as a countercyclical response that might otherwise protect Malaysia's economy. He also pressed for the country to move beyond existing manufacturing capabilities through education, research and development to develop greater strength as a provider of sophisticated business services.

=== Becoming prime minister ===
After a poor showing by the ruling UMNO coalition in the elections of 8 March 2008 in which opposition parties gained control of five of thirteen Malaysian state governments, Badawi identified Najib as his intended successor. On 8 October 2008, Prime Minister Badawi announced he would step down in March 2009, paving the way for Najib to succeed him. However he said the onus was on Najib to win party elections set for March before he could take over. Najib ran for the presidency of UMNO and went on to win on 2 November 2008, without contest.

On 3 April 2009, Najib was sworn in as prime minister.

== Prime minister (2009–2018) ==
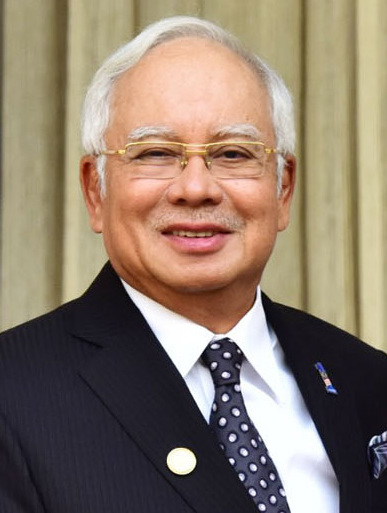
Najib in New Delhi in 2018

During his tenure as prime minister, Najib implemented various economic and infrastructure development programs, including the 1Malaysia Development Berhad (1MDB) initiative. However, his leadership was marred by allegations of corruption and misappropriation of funds related to the 1MDB scandal, which led to his political downfall. In this scandal, it was alleged that billions of dollars were siphoned off from the 1MDB state investment fund, which Najib was closely associated with, into his personal accounts and those of his associates. These funds were purportedly used for various personal expenses, including luxury real estate, artwork, and even financing the production of Hollywood films.

Najib consistently denied any wrongdoing and claimed that the funds in his personal accounts were donations from a Saudi royal family member, which he said were used for political purposes and not for personal gain. However, investigations by various authorities in multiple countries, including the United States and Switzerland, uncovered evidence suggesting a different story.

In 2018, Najib's political career faced a significant setback when his party, Barisan Nasional, lost the general elections to the Pakatan Harapan coalition. Subsequently, he faced legal charges related to the 1MDB scandal.

=== Domestic policy ===
==== 1Malaysia ====
1Malaysia is an ongoing campaign announced by Najib on 16 September 2008, calling for the cabinet, government agencies, and civil servants to emphasise ethnic harmony, national unity, and efficient governance. The eight values of 1Malaysia as articulated by Najib are perseverance, a culture of excellence, acceptance, loyalty, education, humility, integrity, and meritocracy. While the concept aimed to promote national unity and inclusiveness, some critics argued that it was primarily a political slogan and that it did not lead to significant policy changes to address the underlying issues of ethnic and cultural diversity in the country.

On 17 September 2008, Najib launched 1Malaysia.com.my in an effort to communicate with the citizens of Malaysia more efficiently and support the broader 1Malaysia campaign. He has used the site to highlight his policy initiatives and to provide a forum for Malaysians to their government. The 1Malaysia campaign makes extensive use of social media platforms such as Facebook and Twitter. Research has suggested that Najib and UMNO have made extensive efforts to establish a favourable online presence through the recruitment and support of bloggers and other social media users, sometimes known as 'cybertroopers.'

However, Najib has been criticised for an apparent deterioration of race relations in Malaysia during his tenure that has occurred despite the 1Malaysia programme. In 2014, the long-serving former Prime Minister Mahathir Mohamad withdrew his support for Najib citing, among other things, the abandonment by Chinese voters of the Barisan Nasional coalition. Najib's tenure has also been marked by increasingly aggressive racial rhetoric from elements within Najib's UMNO party, particularly towards Chinese Malaysians. Additionally, there were concerns that the government's efforts to promote 1Malaysia were seen by some as a way to consolidate power and influence.

So, while the 1Malaysia concept was intended to promote unity and inclusiveness, it did face controversy and criticism from various quarters during Najib Razak's tenure as prime minister.

==== BR1M Project ====
The first BR1M Project was a scheme devised by Najib Razak to help poor Malaysians. The amount of RM 500.00 Ringgit Malaysia was given to households with an income of less than RM 3,000 a month.

The second BR1M Project, also known as BR1M 2.0, with more than 2.5 billion ringgit will be distributed to Malaysians nationwide. This will affect 5.7 million household all over the country. In addition to the RM 500.00 for household, the government has also allocated RM 250.00 to single individuals. Those who have received RM 500.00 from the first BR1M project need not apply as it will be automatically processed.

BR1M 4.0, which was announced in 2014, saw an increase in handouts from RM 650 to RM 950 for individuals earning less than RM 2,000.00, while households earning less than RM 4,000 will receive RM 750.

==== Housing programme ====
Perumahan Rakyat 1Malaysia (PR1MA) Berhad was established under the PR1MA Act 2012 to plan, develop, construct and maintain affordable lifestyle housing for middle-income households in key urban centres. Middle-income is defined as a monthly household (husband and wife) income of between RM 2,500 and RM 7,500.

PR1MA will be the first organisation that exclusively targets this middle segment with homes ranging from RM 100,000 to RM 400,000 in a sustainable community.

==== National Security Council Bill 2015 ====
In December 2015, the National Security Council Bill 2015 was passed in Parliament after a marathon six-hour debate. The bill provides the Prime Minister of Malaysia with unprecedented powers, such as the ability to define what constitutes a security issue as well as deem any part of Malaysia a security area. Within that area, authorities may make arrests, conduct searches or seize property without a warrant. The bill was criticised by rights groups as inviting government abuse. The Malaysian Bar called it a "lurch towards an authoritarian government". The government has defended the bill, with cabinet minister Shahidan Kassim saying the law is necessary to enable better co-ordination and a uniform response in the event the country is faced with security threats, and that the law does not contravene the basic human rights guaranteed under the federal constitution.

=== Economic policy ===
==== New Economic Model ====
On 2 May 2009, Najib announced the government's plan to develop a New Economic Model that will speed Malaysia's transition to a high-income country. The plan will emphasise ways to increase the income and productivity of workers by encouraging knowledge industries and increasing investment from overseas.

==== Reform of government subsidies ====
Najib has started to implement comprehensive reform of government subsidies. On 16 July 2010, subsidies for petrol, diesel and LPG were cut as part of Malaysia's general programme of reducing and rationalising subsidies per the 10th Malaysia Plan and the New Economic Model. The government believes it will save RM 750 million by the end of 2010 through these measures with little negative impact on most citizens. Sugar and fuel subsidies were selected for reform because they disproportionately benefit the wealthy and foreigners, encourage over-consumption and create opportunities for fraud and smuggling. Najib expressed his hope that Malaysians would adopt a healthier lifestyle. He said, "there is no logic in the government allocating subsidies worth almost RM1 billion on a commodity that could endanger the people's health". Responding to concerns about how these reforms might affect the poor, the Prime Minister's Office pointed out that Malaysia will still be spending RM 7.82 billion per year on fuel and sugar subsidies and that prices for these commodities would remain the lowest in Southeast Asia. The government also stated that education and health care would continue receiving state support.

==== Economic liberalisation ====
Malaysia has implemented substantial measures to attract foreign investment including a moderation of preferences designed to benefit ethnic Malays. Specifically these reforms include allowing foreign investors to hold majority stakes in most enterprises excluding "strategic" industries such as banking, telecommunications, and energy, easing insurance regulation, curtailing powers of the Foreign Investment Committee and lowering the minimum quota for Malay ownership in publicly traded companies from 30 percent to 12.5 percent. As he introduced the reforms Najib stated, "The world is changing quickly and we must be ready to change with it or risk being left behind."

Since these reforms have been implemented, the American banking firms Goldman Sachs and Citigroup have been granted permission to expand their operations in Malaysia. Goldman Sachs received licenses to set up fund management and advisory operations. Citigroup has obtained a permit to offer brokerage services. The approval of these licenses is a sharp break from Malaysia's history of domestically dominated and tightly regulated markets for financial services.

The International Institute for Management Development responded to these and other reforms by increasing Malaysia's ranking to the 10th-most competitive economy in the world in 2010 from 18th in 2009. Malaysia, which is now ranked fifth in the Asia Pacific region, scored well in business and government efficiency. Economists attributed the rise of Malaysia's ranking to the efforts of the Malaysian government to improve the country's business environment such as the New Economic Model, the Government Transformation Programme and the Economic Transformation Programme.

==== Stimulus packages ====
The Malaysian government passed two stimulus packages to mitigate the effects of the global economic downturn. The first stimulus package, worth RM 7 billion, was announced on 4 November 2008. The second package, worth RM 60 billion, was announced on 10 March 2009. Since assuming office as prime minister, Najib has been monitoring the progress of the stimulus packages on a weekly basis. Government economists believe that the stimulus packages have successfully generated increased economic activity, especially in the construction sector. Malaysia's central bank reported that Malaysia's economy grew at an annualised rate of 9.5% during the first half of 2010. Najib says the country is on track to meet the 6% average annual growth to reach its goal of becoming a developed country by 2020. Commenting on this same economic data Najib said that as of August 2010 there were no plans for further economic stimulus. Rather he said the government would focus on improving Malaysia's economic fundamentals and increasing investment.

=== Foreign policy ===
==== Palestine ====
The government of Malaysia has long been a strong supporter of the Palestinian cause against the Israeli occupation of the West Bank. Malaysia also supports unity between the Palestinian Fatah and Hamas factions. Najib visited the West Bank with his wife Rosmah Mansor, escorted by senior officers of the Malaysian government. Najib became the first Muslim leader from South East Asia to set foot on Palestinian soil. Najib says Palestinians can count on Malaysia, but for there to be lasting peace, Hamas and Fatah must unite to safeguard the safety and security of the Palestinian people. Malaysia will give Palestine the moral, financial and political support it needs to rise above its struggles, but securing a future of lasting peace hinges on the Palestinians being united. Najib also stated that for Palestine to move towards having a future it envisioned, Palestinians would have to take the first step – to unite among themselves.

==== United States ====
Najib's visit in September 2017 to the United States on the invitation of President Donald Trump successfully strengthened the Comprehensive Partnership that was established between Malaysia and the United States in 2014.

Najib enjoyed a close personal relationship with then US President Barack Obama and managed to upgrade Malaysia-US relations to a 'comprehensive partnership'.

Najib and Obama met just before the Nuclear Security Summit in Washington on 12 April 2010. This was their first one-on-one meeting. During their talk, Obama sought further assistance from Malaysia in stemming nuclear proliferation which Obama described as the greatest threat to world security. During the summit, Najib stressed that Malaysia only supported nuclear programmes designed for peaceful purposes. Najib's attendance at the summit was part of a week-long official visit to the United States.

==== India ====
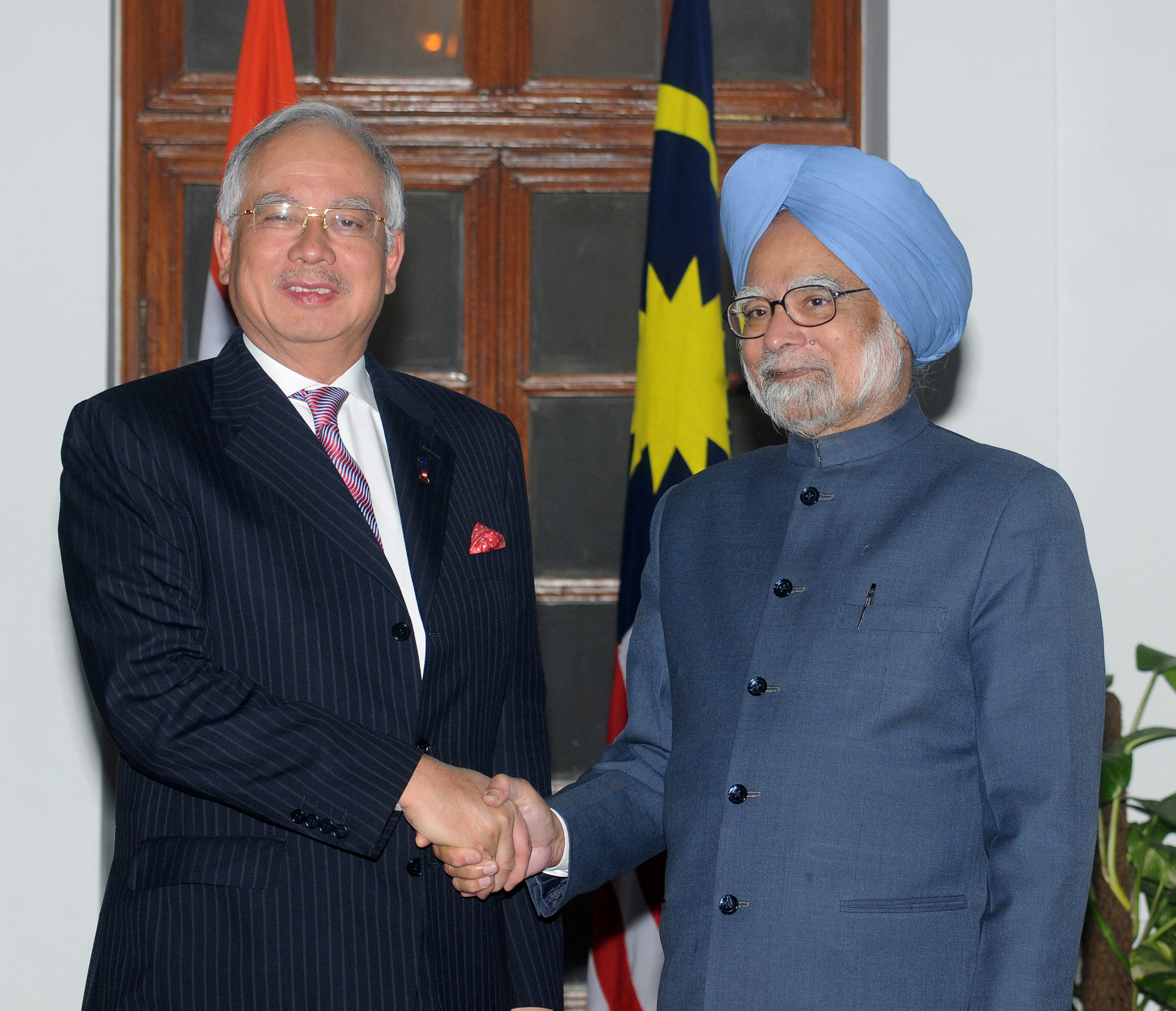
Najib with then Indian Prime Minister Manmohan Singh in 2010

Najib travelled to India on a five-day state visit in January 2010. His 200-strong entourage included cabinet ministers, deputy ministers, state government officials, members of parliament, and prominent business leaders. During his visit, Najib pushed for a free-trade agreement and co-operation across a wide range of fields. Najib and Indian Prime Minister Manmohan Singh signed an extradition treaty and agreements to co-operate in the areas of higher education and finance. The two countries agreed to sign a free-trade agreement before the end of 2010 and Najib called for signing a "Comprehensive Economic Cooperation Agreement" by the same date. These economic agreements have resulted in plans for RM 1.6 trillion in investment for Malaysia. In January 2010, Najib announced plans to develop a new visa regime for Indian nationals, specifically for managers and knowledge workers to visit Malaysia.

==== New Zealand ====
Under Najib's government, Malaysia signed a free-trade agreement (FTA) with New Zealand on 26 October 2009 to take effect 1 August 2010. The agreement will reduce or eliminate tariffs on thousands of industrial and agricultural products. The two countries have also agreed to reciprocate most-favoured nation status in private education, engineering services, environmental protection, mining services and information technology.

==== Myanmar ====
In a protest rally in December 2016, Najib criticized the Myanmar authorities for the military crackdown on Rohingya Muslims, and described the ongoing persecution as "genocide".

=== 14th Malaysian general election ===
Malaysia held its 14th general election in May 2018, where Barisan Nasional suffered a historic defeat, failing to win a majority for the first time in the country's history. Observers attributed the loss to the unpopular Goods and Services Tax and the 1MDB corruption scandal.

As the results became clear, Najib appeared on the morning of 10 May to state that he accepted the people's will, though he stopped short of conceding defeat. His comments were criticized by some analysts as "unstatesmanlike".

On 12 May 2018, Najib resigned as President of UMNO and Chairman of BN, with UMNO vice-president Hishammuddin Hussein succeeding him.

== Post-premiership (2018–present) ==
Najib accepted the defeat and pledged to facilitate a smooth transfer of power. On 12 May 2018, three days after he lost the general elections, a flight manifest stated that Najib and his wife, Rosmah were taking a private jet to Halim Perdanakusuma International Airport in Jakarta. In response, the Immigration Department, upon the orders of Prime Minister Mahathir Mohamad, imposed a travel ban barring their exit from the country. Amidst the country's mood turning against him, Najib resigned as the leader of UMNO and Barisan Nasional on the same day.

The newly elected Pakatan Harapan government swiftly reopened investigations into the 1MDB scandal. Since 16 May 2018, the Malaysian police have searched six properties linked to Najib and Rosmah as part of the investigation into the 1MDB scandal. They have seized 284 boxes filled with designer handbags, 72 large luggage bags containing cash in multiple currencies, and other valuables. The Malaysian police commissioner confirmed that the police seized goods with an estimated value of between US$223 and US$273 million. The police described it as the biggest seizure in Malaysian history.

In January 2019, a 7-second video clip of Najib uttered "Malu Apa Bossku" ("What's there to be ashamed of my boss") went viral on the internet. Najib later released a picture of him posed on a Yamaha Y150 motorcycle with the registration plate 8055KU (BOSSKU). The catchphrase and the picture went viral on social media, especially with Malay youths, and inspired videos, memes, t-shirts, caps, vehicle stickers and a music video. The phenomenon has contributed to Najib's rise in popularity. Najib also claimed that his "Bossku" phenomenon has contributed to a victory for his party in 2020 Kimanis by-election.

In December 2023, his lawyer Mohamed Shafee Abdullah stated that Najib already requested to pursue Doctor of Philosophy (PhD) while serving his jail sentence in the prison.

== Controversies and issues ==
=== Murder of Altantuya Shaariibuu ===
Mongolian model Altantuya Shaariibuu disappeared outside the house of Abdul Razak Baginda, formerly a close associate of Najib, on October 19, 2006. She was never seen alive again. Three weeks later, her remains were found in a forest in Selangor. In 2008, Abdul Razak was acquitted by the High Court of abetment in the murder of Altantuyaa. In 2015, Chief Inspector Azilah Hadri and Corporal Sirul Azhar Umar were found guilty of her murder and sentenced to death.

In 2007, a Mongolian witness caused a stir in court when she revealed that Altantuya had been photographed having a meal with a Malaysian government official named 'Najib'. Detective P. Balasubramaniam also linked Najib to Altantuya in a statutory declaration (SD) on July 3, 2008. Najib has repeatedly denied knowing Altantuya or that he had any part in her death. Reviewing the Altantuyaa case, Tommy Thomas, Attorney General of Malaysia from 2018 to 2020, wrote that the evidence "implicated not only Najib Razak as the person who gave [one of the bodyguards] the order to kill, but also his aide-de-camp, Musa Safri".

=== LCS scandal ===
Najib has been implicated in the misappropriation of funds in the purchase of littoral combat ships (LCS). There is a perception that Najib was "the most powerful decision-maker" in the LCS procurement arrangements as he was both prime minister and finance minister at the time (April 2009). In 2022, Najib commented that the project was given to contractor Boustead Naval Shipyard Sdn Bhd because it was owned by the Armed Forces Fund Board (LTAT) and all profits of the project would thus go to the armed forces.

=== 1Malaysia Development Berhad scandal ===
On 2 July 2015, The Wall Street Journal ran an exposé alleging that MYR 2.672 billion (US$700 million) had been channelled from 1MDB into Najib's personal bank accounts, triggering widespread calls for his resignation. Najib denied any wrongdoing and announced plans to sue the newspaper for libel but eventually failed to do so. On 6 July 2015, amid the 1MDB scandal, the ringgit fell to 3.8050 against the US dollar, the first time it slid beyond the 3.80 currency peg, which was lifted in 2005. To back up the allegations, on 7 July 2015, The Wall Street Journal released a batch of partially redacted documents that purportedly show how nearly US$700 million (RM2.6 billion) was moved from 1MDB into Najib's personal bank accounts. These documents relate to transactions in March 2013, December 2014 and February 2015.

The multi-agency task force investigating these allegations reported on 10 July 2015 that Najib's bank accounts at AmBank Islamic were closed before The Wall Street Journal reported the transfers of billions of ringgit to those accounts, thereby confirming that Najib had two accounts at that bank. The task force also confirmed that the six accounts it had just frozen did not belong to Najib but did not name the holders of those accounts Najib's handling of the corruption scandal was criticised by, among others, former Prime Minister Mahathir Mohamad and then Deputy Prime Minister Muhyiddin Yassin. During Najib's mid-term Cabinet reshuffle on 28 July 2015, Najib dropped Muhyiddin from his position as deputy prime minister, as well as other Ministers who had been critical of his leadership. Najib stated that the reason for this was to create a more "unified team".

On 1 August 2015, Najib addressed UMNO delegates in Seremban and in a clear reference to the Sarawak Report, the London-based whistleblower site founded and operated by journalist Clare Rewcastle Brown, demanded that "white people" stay out of Malaysia's affairs and stressed that he valued loyalty above all, and not smart people.

On 3 August 2015, the Malaysian Anti-Corruption Commission stated that the RM 2.6 billion that had been banked into Najib's personal account came from donors, not 1MDB, but did not elaborate on who the donors were or why the funds were transferred, nor why this explanation had taken so long to emerge since the allegations were first made on 2 July 2015. Umno Kuantan division chief Wan Adnan Wan Mamat later claimed that the RM 2.6 billion was from Saudi Arabia as thanks for fighting ISIS. He further claimed that the Muslim community in the Philippines as well as southern Thailand had also received similar donations, and that since the donations were made to Najib personally as opposed to UMNO, the funds were deposited into Najib's personal accounts.

The scandal took a dramatic twist on 28 August 2015 when a member of Najib's own party, Anina Saaduddin, UMNO's Langkawi Wanita (women's) representative, filed a civil suit against him alleging a breach of duties as trustee and that he defrauded party members by failing to disclose receipt of the donated funds, and account for their use. This suit was filed in the Kuala Lumpur High Court and also named party Executive Secretary Abdul Rauf Yusof. Expressing fear that Najib would wield influence to remove any member of UMNO "for the sole purpose of avoiding liability" the court was also petitioned for an injunction to restrain UMNO, its Supreme Council, state liaison body, divisions and branches from removing the nominal plaintiff as a party member pending the determination of the suit. The plaintiff also sought repayment amounting to US$650 million, the amount allegedly deposited by Najib to a Singapore bank, an account of all monies that he had received in the form of donations, details of all monies in the AmPrivate Banking Account No 2112022009694 allegedly belonging to Najib, along with damages, costs, and other reliefs.

On 21 September 2015, The New York Times reported that US investigators were investigating allegations of corruption involving Najib as well as people close to him. In particular, investigators focused on properties in the United States that were purchased in recent years by shell companies owned by Najib's stepson Riza Aziz or connected to a close family friend, as well as a $681 million payment made to what is believed to be Najib's personal bank account.

The claimed MYR 2.6 billion "donation" into Najib's personal accounts led the opposition to table a no-confidence motion against Najib, on 18 October 2015.

On 26 January 2016, Malaysia's Attorney General Mohamed Apandi Ali announced that the investigation into the $681 million payment into Najib's personal bank account had been closed. The Anti-Corruption Commission investigating the gift, led by Apandi, concluded that no laws had been broken and that the gift did not amount to graft. Apandi was appointed attorney general by Najib in August 2015 after the previous attorney general, Abdul Gani Patail, was abruptly dismissed by Najib. Although Bernama, Malaysia's state-run news service, reported that Abdul Gani was removed for health reasons, many speculated that his dismissal was related to the 1MDB corruption investigation. The Attorney General then said that the [Saudi Royal Family] was the source of the $681 million gift, although doubts remained as the Saudi ministries of foreign affairs and finance had no information on the purported gift.

Najib was reported to have returned $620 million to the Saudi royal family in 2013, but no explanation was given as to the reason for the investment or what happened to the $61 million Najib did not return. Najib hailed the results of the investigation and reiterated his denial of any wrongdoing.

On 28 March 2016, the Australian television programme Four Corners in an episode called State of Fear: Murder and Money in Malaysia, aired new allegations about the large sums of money that have flowed into the bank accounts of Najib Razak.

On 30 March 2016, The Wall Street Journal, Time and several other news agencies reported that Najib and his wife, Rosmah Mansor had spent $15 million on luxury goods and extravagant travel expenses. During Najib Razak's golf diplomacy with U.S. President Barack Obama on 24 December 2014, Malaysian investigation documents show that Rosmah Mansor had purchased items amounting to $130,625 at a Chanel store in Honolulu, Hawaii. The allegation was confirmed when a store employee at the Chanel store in the upscale Ala Moana Center recalled Najib's wife shopping there just before 25 December 2014.

In April 2016, Mohd Nazifuddin Najib, the son of Najib, was named in the Panama Papers.

In July 2016, the United States Department of Justice launched a civil lawsuit to seize American assets worth over US$1 billion (4.1 billion MYR) allegedly obtained from US$3.5 billion (14.38 billion MYR) of misappropriated 1MDB funds. Within the civil lawsuit, a government official of high rank who had control over 1MDB was referred to as "Malaysian Official 1", and mentioned over 30 times. "Malaysian Official 1" was alleged to have received around US$681 million (2.797 billion MYR) of stolen 1MDB money via Falcon Bank, Singapore on 21 and 25 March 2013, of which US$650 million (2.0 billion MYR) was sent back to Falcon Bank on 30 August 2013. In September 2016, Najib was identified as "Malaysian Official 1" by Abdul Rahman Dahlan, Minister in the Prime Minister's Department and the Barisan Nasional strategic communications director. Dahlan also claimed that Najib was not named because he was "not part of this investigation".

On 15 June 2017, The United States Department of Justice followed up on its July 2016 lawsuit by issuing a civil action in rem to forfeit assets involved in and traceable to an international conspiracy to launder money misappropriated from 1Malaysia Development Berhad ("a strategic investment and development company wholly-owned by the government of Malaysia"). The writ provided detailed justifications for seeing to forfeit specific items and property located in the United States and abroad, including in the United Kingdom and Switzerland.

As a consequence of the 15 June 2017 writ, on 28 February 2018 Indonesian authorities seized the luxury yacht linked to the 1MDB investigations in waters off Bali, on behalf of the FBI. Additionally, on 7 March 2018 in Californian courts, the producers of the 'Wolf of Wall Street' film agreed to pay $60m to settle Justice Department claims it financed the movie with money siphoned from 1MDB.

In a speech in December 2017, US attorney general Jeff Sessions said of the scandal: "This is kleptocracy at its worst."

=== COVID-19 measure violations ===
On 6 May 2021 amid the COVID-19 pandemic in Malaysia, Najib was given two fines amounting to RM3,000 for failing to comply with standard operating procedures (SOPs) of the conditional movement control order (CMCO) at a chicken rice restaurant. On 11 January 2022, the police opened an investigation into an event attended by Najib over claims that there was a breach of COVID-19 SOPs.

On 27 February 2022, Health Minister Khairy Jamaluddin said he will review a video depicting Najib purportedly violating COVID-19 SOPs during a campaign visit in Perling, Johor. On 10 March 2022, Health Minister Khairy Jamaluddin revealed that his ministry had issued 42 compound notices for the violation of SOPs during the campaign period for the Johor election, including five to Najib.

== Legal issues ==
=== First SRC International case ===
==== Legal proceedings and conviction ====
Najib Razak
- Status: Incarcerated at the Kajang Prison since 23 August 2022: SRC case sentence commuted on 2 February 2024 by Yang di-Pertuan Agong Abdullah of Pahang; 1MDB-Tanore case sentence to begin in 2028
- Convictions: SRC International case: Criminal breach of trust under Section 409 of the Penal Code (3 counts); Money laundering under Section 4(1)(b) of Anti-Money Laundering, Anti-Terrorism Financing and Proceeds of Unlawful Activities Act 2001 (3 counts); Abuse of power under Section 23 of the Malaysian Anti-Corruption Commission Act 2009; 1MDB-Tanore case: Abuse of power under Section 23(1) of the Malaysian Anti-Corruption Commission Act 2009 (4 counts); Money laundering under Section 4(1)(a) of Anti-Money Laundering, Anti-Terrorism Financing and Proceeds of Unlawful Activities Act 2001 (21 counts)
- Penalty: SRC International case: 12 years of imprisonment and fine of RM210 million (with additional five years of imprisonment if default on fine); Commuted to 6 years imprisonment and a RM50 million fine; 1MDB-Tanore case: 15 years of imprisonment and fine of RM13.5 billion (with additional 12.5 years imprisonment if default on fine)

Details
- Date apprehended: 3 July 2018

On 3 July 2018 after the 14th Malaysian general election, Najib was arrested by the Malaysian Anti-Corruption Commission (MACC) as part of investigations into how RM42 million (US$10.6 million) went from SRC International into Najib's bank account. The following day, Najib was indicted in the High Court in Kuala Lumpur on three counts of criminal breach of trust and one count of abuse of power in connection with SRC International funds totalling RM42 million. He was granted bail at RM1 million after pleading not guilty with his trial set for 18 February 2019.

On 8 August 2018, Najib was charged with three further counts of money laundering as part of the MACC's investigation into the 1MDB scandal. Najib has denied making three transfers totalling RM42 from SRC International into his bank accounts.

On 10 September 2018, Najib posted a copy of the letter that purportedly came from Prince Saud Abdulaziz Al-Saud of Saudi Arabia on his Facebook account, as a proof of the alleged financial donation of US$100mil (RM304.5mil) given to him in 2011. He said he decided to reveal the documents in a bid to clear his name of various accusations and slander, and would continue to do so on his social media accounts.

On 19 September 2018, Najib was arrested following two hours of questioning by the MACC, believed to be in relation to the RM2.6 billion donation he received in year 2013. Najib was charged on 20 September 2018 at the Sessions Court in Jalan Duta. However, he pleaded not guilty and was released on bail after his court appearance. On 21 September, he made a brief appearance at the Sessions Court registry to sign his bail at RM3.5 million for 25 counts of money laundering and abuse of power charges in relation to 1MDB. He has posted RM1 million for his bail, while the remaining RM2.5 million will be settled in instalments by the following week. In August 2019, during his second trial, Najib faces four charges of abuse of power and 21 charges of money laundering for receiving illegal transfers of RM 2.3 billion between 2011 and 2014.

On 28 July 2020, the High Court convicted Najib guilty on all seven counts of abuse of power, money laundering and criminal breach of trust in relation to the SRC International case, becoming the first Prime Minister of Malaysia to be convicted of corruption. High Court judge Mohamad Nazlan Mohamad Ghazali has delivered the verdict regarding the misappropriation of RM42 million (US$10 million) from SRC International, a former subsidiary of 1MDB. In total, Najib faces 42 charges, of which 35 in another four trials are yet to be decided on.

On the day of his conviction, Najib was sentenced to 12 years' imprisonment and a fine of RM210 million (for the first charge). He was also given six concurrent sentences of 10 years' imprisonment for the other six charges. If he fails to pay the fine, he will be serving another five years in prison. He would be appealing against the verdict of the High Court. The High Court granted a stay of execution of the conviction with an increased bail of RM 2 million with reporting to the police on the first and the fifth day of every month.

==== Appeal ====
Najib's appeal hearing in front of the Court of Appeal of Malaysia began on 5 April 2021. On 8 December 2021, the Court of Appeal of Malaysia dismissed Najib's appeal, therefore upholding both his conviction and 12-year sentence. Judge Abdul Karim Abdul Jalil has also condemned Najib's actions as a "national embarrassment". Najib's lawyer stated that his client, who remained outside prison on bail, would further appeal to the Federal Court of Malaysia against his conviction and sentence. On 16 August 2022, Malaysia's supreme court rejected Najib's appeal for a retrial, stating that the case had no evidence of bias. The Federal Court indicated that it would hear a final appeal by Razak in the SRC corruption case from 18 August 2022.

On 23 August 2022, when the Federal Court was finishing hearing the appeal, Najib's counsel made an application to recuse the Chief Justice Tengku Maimun. This application was dismissed and the Federal Court upheld the Court of Appeal's conviction, handing down its full judgment here. Najib was sent to Kajang Prison on the same day to begin his prison sentence.

Najib is the first Malaysian former prime minister to be convicted and jailed for corruption. Rumours that he would receive special treatment during his sentence were denied by officials. Upon the dissolution of Parliament on 10 October 2022, Najib's Pekan parliamentary seat was automatically vacated, and as he has been convicted of a crime, he is no longer eligible to stand in general elections.

==== Commutation and house arrest ====
On 2 February 2024, the Malaysian pardons board, headed by the outgoing Yang di-Pertuan Agong Abdullah of Pahang announced that it had reduced Najib's sentence to six years and reduced fines imposed on him to 50 million ringgit ($10.59 million). On 3 April, Najib submitted an application in court requesting that his jail sentenced be converted to house arrest, which was rejected on 3 July.

On 24 October 2024, Najib apologised for the damage caused by the 1MDB scandal but insisted that he had been misled over the matter, saying that "Being held legally responsible for things that I did not initiate or knowingly enable is unfair to me".

On 27 November, the Kuala Lumpur High Court discharged a case of criminal breach of trust against Najib Razak over the 1MDB scandal, citing procedural delays. However, the court also allowed the filing of six addition cases against Najib and his treasury secretary Mohd Irwan Serigar Abdullah for misappropriating 6.6 billion ringgit ($1.5 billion) in public funds earmarked for 1MDB's settlement payment to International Petroleum Investment Company of the United Arab Emirates.

In January 2025, the Court of Appeal granted Najib Razak the right to access a document he claims could allow him to serve his sentence at home. A letter from the royal palace confirmed the existence of a royal order for house arrest, which was acknowledged publicly for the first time. This decision was upheld by the Federal Court in August, which then remitted the case back to High Court to ascertain the validity of the addendum order. However in December, the High Court ruled that the royal order was invalid and denied his request for house arrest. The High Court cited that the order was made without prior deliberation of the pardons board, hence it was in violation with Article 42 of the Constitution. The judge said the lack of legal provisions for house arrest under Malaysian law also rendered such an order unenforceable.

Soon after the High Court judgement, Najib's lead counsel Shafee Abdullah told the court of Najib's intention to appeal, and an appeal was formally filed on 24 December. On 27 April 2026, it was reported that Najib has formally withdrawn the appeal to the Court of Appeal “without liberty to file afresh” back on 3 April, and subsequently has his appeal recorded as struck out by the deputy registrar of the Court of Appeal on 14 April. With this withdrawal, Najib has relinquished his right to appeal for house arrest. No reasons were given for the withdrawal, and Najib's lawyer Shafee has refused to comment when pressed over the issue.

On 18 September 2026, Najib was granted a conditional pardon which commuted the remainder of his sentence to house arrest. The commutation is dependent on him complying a number of conditions, including the payment of a RM50 million fine. The decision was made at the 64th meeting of the Federal Territories Board chaired by the King of Malaysia, Ibrahim Iskandar, following a deferment of Najib's pardon application the previous week. On 10 November 2026, Najib began serving his revised sentence at his residence in Kuala Lumpur.

=== Second SRC International case ===
On 3 February 2019, Najib claimed trial to three charges of money laundering related to a sum of RM27 million from SRC International. Proceedings were put on hold pending the conclusion of the first SRC International case. The judge granted Najib a discharge not amounting to acquittal on 20 June 2025 following a series of postponements and delays.

=== 1MDB-Tanore case ===
On 26 December 2025, after six years of trial, the High Court convicted Najib on four counts of abuse of power and 21 counts of money laundering regarding the channelling of more than $700 million in funds over the 1MDB scandal, which Najib insisted were political donations from the Saudi royal family instead of originating from 1MDB. He was sentenced to 15 years' imprisonment and a fine of 13.5 billion ringgit ($3.3 billion). The court also ordered his 15 years jail term to begin in 2028, after finishing his previous SRC International case prison terms. If default on the fine, he will also face additional 10 years in prison for the abuse of power charges, and 2 years and six months for the money laundering charges. After the verdict, Najib's lawyer Shafee Abdullah indicated that they will appeal the case to the Court of Appeal on 29 December.

=== 1MDB audit tampering case ===
Najib was charged with abuse of power as a public official under Section 23(1) of the MACC Act 2009, accused of ordering changes to 1MDB audit reports covering the period from 2009 to 2014 before it was presented to the Public Accounts Committee. The trial began on 18 November 2019, and Najib was acquitted on 3 March 2024. On 13 September, the Court of Appeal struck out the prosecution's notices of appeal, stating that it had failed to file a petition of appeal within the alotted time and had not applied for an extension.

=== IPIC case ===
In September 2018, Najib was charged with six instances of criminal breach of trust relating to alleged misappropriation of a total of RM6.6 billion government funds and transferring them to the International Petroleum Investment Company (IPIC) under Section 409 and 32 of the Penal Code. The sum was allegedly used to repay 1MDB loans owed to IPIC. On 27 November 2024, Najib was granted a discharge not amounting to acquittal by the High Court, with judge Muhammad Jamil Hussin citing an "inordinate delay" and the prosecution's failure to provide necessary documents to the accused prior to the commencement of a trial as laid out in Section 51A of the Criminal Procedure Code.

== Personal life ==
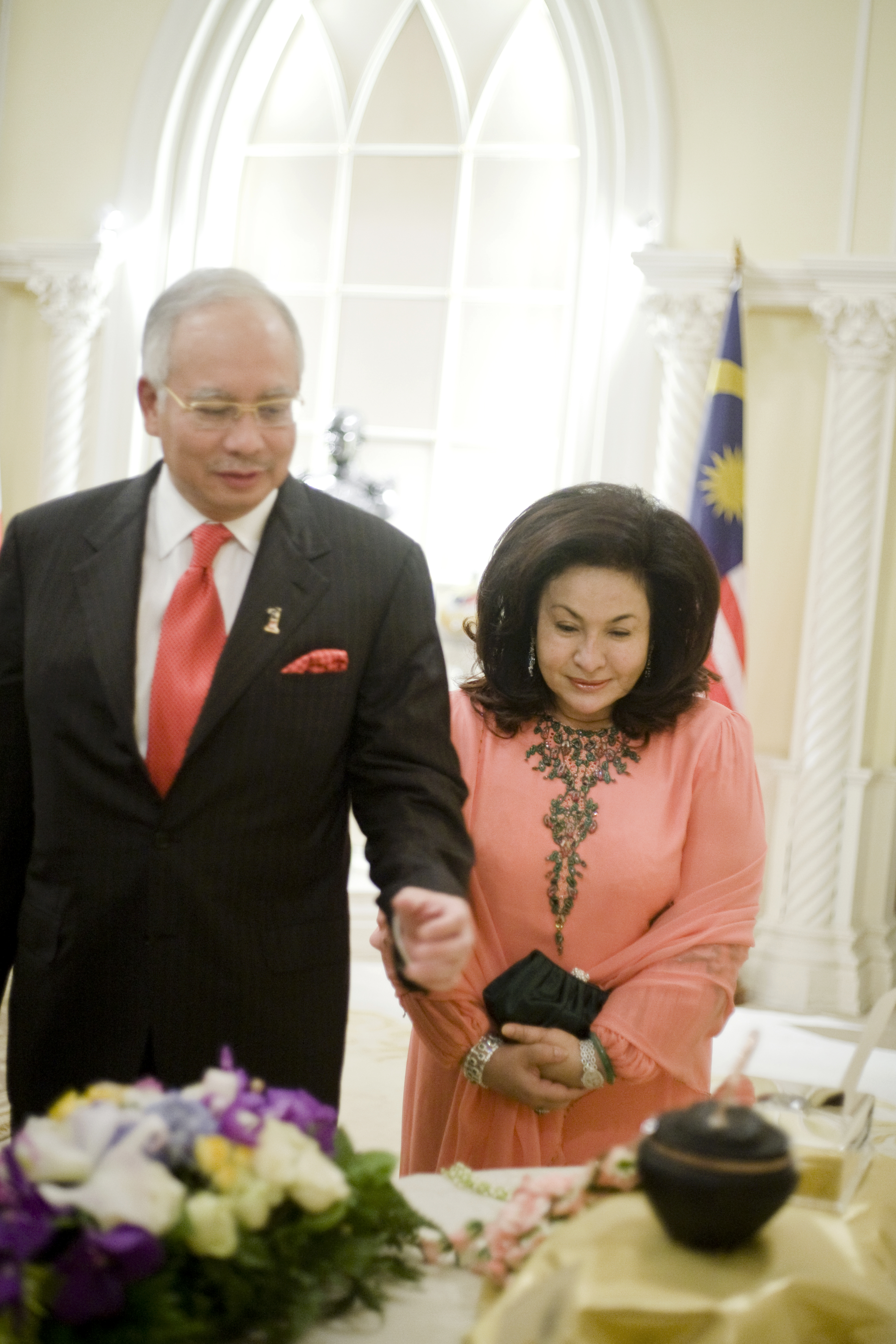
Najib with his wife Rosmah Mansor in 2009

In 1976, Najib married Tengku Puteri Zainah Tengku Eskandar ('Kui Yie') with whom he has three children: Mohd Nizar Najib (born 1978), Mohd Nazifuddin Najib and Puteri Norlisa Najib.

In 1987, he divorced Kui Yie and married Datin Seri Rosmah Mansor with whom he has two children: Mohd Norashman Najib and Nooryana Najwa Najib. His daughter Nooryana is married to the nephew of former Kazakhstani President, Nursultan Nazarbayev.

Najib's extravagant lifestyle garnered significant attention and controversy during his time in power. His wife Rosmah faced scrutiny for her expensive shopping habits, which allegedly included purchasing luxury handbags, jewelry, and clothing from top fashion brands. A large collection of designer handbags, some of which were worth millions of dollars, was seized from their properties during investigations. Najib was accused of using state funds for personal expenses, including covering credit card bills and luxury purchases. These allegations became a focal point of the 1MDB scandal.

Najib Razak is an avid golf lover and is known to have played golf with the two US Presidents – Barack Obama and Donald Trump. Trump referred to Najib as his "favourite prime minister".

Najib Razak has four long-haired cats, named Kiki, Leo, Tiger and Simba.

== Election results ==
Pahang State Legislative Assembly
Year	Constituency	Candidate	Votes	Pct	Opponent(s)	Votes	Pct	Ballots cast	Majority	Turnout
1982	N26 Bandar Pekan	Najib Razak (UMNO)	3,820	72.50%	Mohamed Rusdi Arif (PAS)	1,449	27.50%	5,377	2,371	73.37%

Parliament of Malaysia
Year	Constituency	Candidate	Votes	Pct	Opponent(s)	Votes	Pct	Ballots cast	Majority	Turnout
1976	P071 Pekan	Najib Razak (UMNO)	Unopposed							
1978	P071 Pekan	Najib Razak (UMNO)	13,876	76.16%	Mohamed Rusdi Arif (PAS)	4,343	23.84%		9,533	
1986	P076 Pekan	Najib Razak (UMNO)	16,431	74.50%	Ali Abdullah Lee (PAS)	5,623	25.50%	22,748	10,808	66.87%
1990	P076 Pekan	Najib Razak (UMNO)	21,262	66.33%	Othman Hitam (S46)	10,795	33.67%	33,414	10,467	71.36%
1995	P080 Pekan	Najib Razak (UMNO)	17,004	73.25%	M. Samuel Mohamed Kamil (S46)	6,211	26.75%	24,565	10,793	71.60%
1999	P080 Pekan	Najib Razak (UMNO)	13,148	50.46%	Ramli Mohamed (PAS)	12,907	49.54%	26,797	241	74.78%
2004	P085 Pekan	Najib Razak (UMNO)	31,956	77.96%	Zakaria Dahlan (PAS)	9,034	22.04%	41,046	22,922	77.91%
2008	P085 Pekan	Najib Razak (UMNO)	36,262	78.73%	Khairul Anuar Ahmad Zainudin (PKR)	9,798	21.27%	47,870	26,464	82.23%
2013	P085 Pekan	Najib Razak (UMNO)	51,278	76.60%	Fariz Musa (PKR)	15,665	23.40%	68,464	35,613	85.30%
2018	P085 Pekan	Najib Razak (UMNO)	43,854	62.10%	Ahiatudin Daud (PAS)	18,995	26.90%	70,614	24,859	79.43%
2018	P085 Pekan	Najib Razak (UMNO)	43,854	62.10%	Zahid Mat Arip (BERSATU)	7,662	8.16%	70,614	24,859	79.43%

== Honours ==
=== Honours of Malaysia ===
- Kedah
  - Member of the Supreme Order of Sri Mahawangsa (DMK) – Dato' Seri Utama (2008)
- Kelantan
  - Knight Grand Commander of the Order of the Crown of Kelantan (SPMK) – Dato' (2004)
- Malacca
  - Knight Grand Commander of the Premier and Exalted Order of Malacca (DUNM) – Datuk Seri Utama (2007)
- Negeri Sembilan
  - Knight Grand Commander of the Order of Loyalty to Negeri Sembilan (SPNS) – Dato' Seri Utama (2005, revoked 26 October 2018)
- Pahang
  - Member 2nd class of the Family Order of the Crown of Indra of Pahang (DK II) (2010)
  - Knight Grand Companion of the Order of Sultan Ahmad Shah of Pahang (SSAP) – Dato' Sri (1985)
  - Knight Grand Companion of the Order of the Crown of Pahang (SIMP) – formerly Dato', now Dato' Indera
  - Knight Companion of the Order of Sultan Ahmad Shah of Pahang (DSAP) – Dato'
- Penang
  - Knight Grand Commander of the Order of the Defender of State (DUPN) – Dato' Seri Utama (2009, revoked 15 September 2022)
- Perak
  - Ordinary Class of the Perak Family Order of Sultan Azlan Shah (SPSA) – Dato' Seri Diraja (2004)
- Perlis
  - Knight Grand Companion of the Order of the Gallant Prince Syed Sirajuddin Jamalullail (SSSJ) – Dato' Seri Diraja (2007)
- Sabah
  - Grand Commander of the Order of Kinabalu (SPDK) – Datuk Seri Panglima (2002)
- Sarawak
  - Knight Grand Commander of the Order of the Star of Hornbill Sarawak (DP) – Datuk Patinggi (2008)
  - Knight Commander of the Most Exalted Order of the Star of Sarawak (PNBS) – Dato Sri (1990)
- Selangor
  - Knight Grand Commander of the Order of the Crown of Selangor (SPMS) – Dato' Seri (2004, suspended 6 May 2019, revoked 12 September 2022)
  - Knight Commander of the Order of the Crown of Selangor (DPMS) – Dato' (1992, suspended 6 May 2019, revoked 12 September 2022)

=== Foreign honours ===
- Bahrain
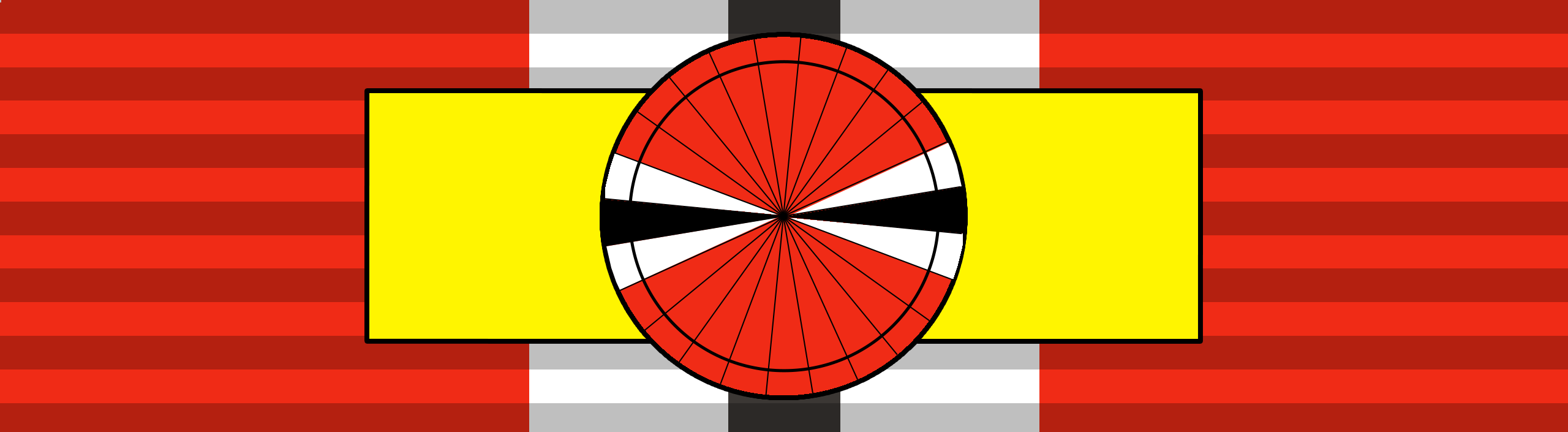
  - King Hamad Order for Development (2017)
  - King Hamad (Al Nahda) First Medal (2017)
- Brunei
  - 1st Class of the Family Order of Brunei (DK) – Dato Laila Utama (2010)
- Saudi Arabia
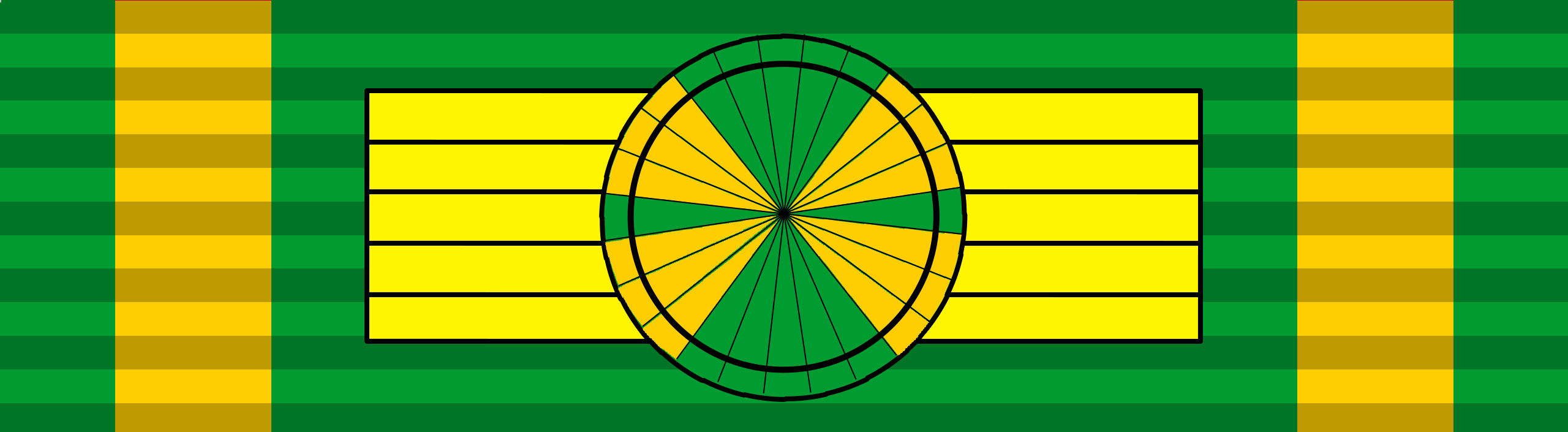
  - Member 1st Class of the Order of Abdulaziz al Saud (2010)
- Singapore
  - Recipient of the Distinguished Service Order (Military) (DUBC) (1995)
- Thailand
  - Knight Grand Cross of the Order of the White Elephant (1991)
- United Arab Emirates
  - Order of the Union Medal (2014)

=== Honorary degrees ===
- Malaysia
  - Honorary Ph.D. degree in Social Transformation from Limkokwing University (2008)
  - Honorary Ph.D. degree from Monash University (2011)
- Japan
  - Honorary Ph.D. degree from Meiji University (2010)
- Palestine
  - Honorary Ph.D. degree from al-Aqsa University (2013)

=== Other ===
On 1 February 2016, FinanceAsia has named Najib as the worst finance minister in 2016. The magazine said that 2015 had been a challenging year for the Malaysian economy, with a "double whammy" of the 1MDB scandal and the collapse in oil prices.

== See also ==
- Najib Razak controversies
- 1Malaysia Development Berhad scandal
- Corruption in Malaysia
- Kleptocracy
- The Kleptocrats
- Murder of Shaariibuugiin Altantuyaa
- Unexplained wealth of the Marcos family

Parliament of Malaysia
Preceded by Abdul Razak Hussein	Member of the Dewan Rakyat for Pekan; 1976–1982	Succeeded by Mohamed Amin Daud
Preceded by Mohamed Amin Daud	Member of the Dewan Rakyat for Pekan; 1986–2022	Succeeded by Sh Mohmed Puzi Sh Ali
Assembly seats
Preceded by Shamsiah Abdul Hamid	Member of the Pahang State Legislative Assembly for Bandar Pekan; 1982–1986	Constituency abolished
Academic offices
Preceded by Anwar Ibrahim	President of International Islamic University Malaysia; 1998–1999	Succeeded by Sanusi Junid
Political offices
Preceded by Sulaiman Daud	Minister of Culture, Youth and Sports; 1986–1990	Succeeded by Annuar Musa
Preceded by Abdullah Ahmad Badawi	Minister of Defence; 1991–1995	Succeeded by Syed Hamid Albar
Preceded by Sulaiman Daud	Minister of Education; 1995–2000	Succeeded by Musa Mohamad
Preceded by Syed Hamid Albar	Minister of Defence; 2000–2008	Succeeded by Abdullah Ahmad Badawi
Preceded by Abdullah Ahmad Badawi	Deputy Prime Minister of Malaysia; 2004–2009	Succeeded by Muhyiddin Yassin
Preceded by Abdullah Ahmad Badawi	Minister of Finance; 2008–2018	Succeeded by Lim Guan Eng
Preceded by Abdullah Ahmad Badawi	Prime Minister of Malaysia; 2009–2018	Succeeded by Mahathir Mohamad
Diplomatic posts
Preceded by Thein Sein	Chairperson of ASEAN; 2015	Succeeded by Bounnhang Vorachith
Party political offices
Preceded by Anwar Ibrahim	Youth Chief of the United Malays National Organisation; 1987–1996	Succeeded by Ahmad Zahid Hamidi
Preceded by Abdullah Ahmad Badawi	Deputy President of the United Malays National Organisation; 2003–2009	Succeeded by Muhyiddin Yassin
Preceded by Abdullah Ahmad Badawi	Chairman of Barisan Nasional; 2009–2018	Succeeded by Ahmad Zahid Hamidi
Preceded by Abdullah Ahmad Badawi	President of the United Malays National Organisation; 2009–2018	Succeeded by Ahmad Zahid Hamidi
