= Peramu Jaya =

Political subdivision in Malaysia

Peramu Jaya (N21)
Pahang constituency

State constituency
- Legislature: Pahang State Legislative Assembly
MLA
Mohamad Nizar Mohamad Najib
BN
- Constituency created: 2003
- First contested: 2004
- Last contested: 2022

Demographics
- Electors (2022): 41,915

Peramu Jaya is a state constituency in Pahang, Malaysia, that is represented in the Pahang State Legislative Assembly.

== Demographics ==
Ethnic breakdown of Peramu Jaya's electorate as of 2022
1. Malay (90.5%)
2. Other ethnicities (5.71%)
3. Chinese (2.81%)
4. Indian (0.99%)

== History ==
=== Polling districts ===
According to the federal gazette issued on 31 October 2022, the Peramu Jaya constituency is divided into 16 polling districts.

State constituency	Polling district	Code	Location
Peramu Jaya (N21)	Kampung Lamir	085/21/01	Pusat Perpindahan Banjir Kampung Lamir
Peramu Jaya (N21)	Tanah Putih	085/21/02	SMK Dato' Mahmud Mat
Peramu Jaya (N21)	Peramu Jaya	085/21/03	SK Peramu Jaya
Peramu Jaya (N21)	Serandu	085/21/04	SK Serandu
Peramu Jaya (N21)	Kuala Pahang	085/21/05	SJK (C) Yoke Hwa Kuala Pahang
Peramu Jaya (N21)	Kampung Marhum	085/21/06	SK Indera Shahbandar
Peramu Jaya (N21)	Pasir Panjang	085/21/07	SK Pasir Panjang
Peramu Jaya (N21)	Ketapang	085/21/08	SMA Al-Attas
Peramu Jaya (N21)	Sungai Miang	085/21/09	SK Sinar Mutiara
Peramu Jaya (N21)	Bandar Pekan	085/21/10	SK Ahmad
Peramu Jaya (N21)	Mengkasar	085/21/11	SM Sains Sultan Haji Ahmad Shah Pekan
Peramu Jaya (N21)	Pulau Jawa	085/21/12	SK Sri Maulana
Peramu Jaya (N21)	Kelat Rendang	085/21/13	SMK Peramu Jaya
Peramu Jaya (N21)	Kampung Langgar	085/21/14	SK Langgar
Peramu Jaya (N21)	Pahang Tua	085/21/15	SK Pahang Tua
Peramu Jaya (N21)	Shahbandar	085/21/16	SK Pekan Jaya

=== Representation history ===
Members of the Legislative Assembly for Peramu Jaya
Assembly	No	Years	Name	Party
Constituency renamed from Kuala Pahang and Cini
11th	N21	2004-2008	Wan Iqbal Afdza Wan Abdul Hamid	BN (UMNO)
12th	N21	2008-2013	Ibrahim Awang Ismail	BN (UMNO)
13th	N21	2013-2018	Sh Mohmed Puzi Sh Ali	BN (UMNO)
14th	N21	2018-2022	Sh Mohmed Puzi Sh Ali	BN (UMNO)
15th	N21	2022–present	Mohamad Nizar Mohamad Najib	BN (UMNO)

== Election results ==
Pahang state election, 2022: Peramu Jaya
Party	Candidate	Votes	%	∆%
BN	Mohamad Nizar Mohamad Najib	19,337	57.63	▼0.99
PN	Abu Talib Muhamad	11,514	34.31	▲34.31
PH	Tugimon Abdul Hamid	2,511	7.48	▲7.48
Independent	Tengku Zainul Hisham Tengku Hisham	193	0.58	▲0.58
Total valid votes		33,555	100.00	
Total rejected ballots		299		
Unreturned ballots		98		
Turnout		33,952	81.00	▼2.10
Registered electors		41,915		
Majority		7,823	23.32	▼3.96
BN hold		Swing		

Pahang state election, 2018: Peramu Jaya
Party	Candidate	Votes	%	∆%
BN	Sh Mohamed Puzi Sh Ali	15,433	58.62	▼6.69
PAS	Abu Kassim Manaf	8,251	31.34	▼2.38
PKR	Salim Abd Majid	2,644	10.04	▲10.04
Total valid votes		26,328	100.00	
Total rejected ballots		403		
Unreturned ballots		103		
Turnout		26,834	83.10	▼2.71
Registered electors		32,291		
Majority		7,182	27.28	▼4.31
BN hold		Swing		
Source(s) "Pahang - 14th General Election Malaysia (GE14 / Pan-Malaysian Islamic PartyU14)". The Star.

Pahang state election, 2013: Peramu Jaya
Party	Candidate	Votes	%	∆%
BN	Sh Mohmed Puzi Sh Ali	15,769	65.31	▲1.68
PAS	Abu Kassim Manaf	8,142	33.72	▼2.64
Independent	Syed Mohammad Faiz Syed Azemmant	233	0.97	▲0.97
Total valid votes		24,144	100.00	
Total rejected ballots		411		
Unreturned ballots		90		
Turnout		24,645	85.81	▲4.39
Registered electors		28,720		
Majority		7,627	31.59	▲4.32
BN hold		Swing		

Pahang state election, 2008: Peramu Jaya
Party	Candidate	Votes	%	∆%
BN	Ibrahim Awang Ismail	10,903	63.63	▼0.34
PAS	Abu Kassim Manaf	6,231	36.37	▲0.34
Total valid votes		17,134	100.00	
Total rejected ballots		309		
Unreturned ballots		81		
Turnout		17,524	81.42	▲0.93
Registered electors		21,523		
Majority		4,672	27.27	▼0.68
BN hold		Swing		

Pahang state election, 2004: Peramu Jaya
Party	Candidate	Votes	%
BN	Wan Iqbal Afdza Wan Abdul Hamid	9,530	63.97
PAS	Mohd Iqbal Hamdy Mohd Rusdi	5,367	36.03
Total valid votes		14,897	100.00
Total rejected ballots		266	
Unreturned ballots		41	
Turnout		15,204	80.49
Registered electors		18,889	
Majority		4,163	27.95
This was a new constituency created.
