= Free Malaysia Today =

Malaysian news portal

- Type: Online news portal
- Format: Online
- Owner: Media Prima
- Founded: October 2007; 18 years ago
- Language: English, Malay
- Headquarters: The West Wing, Menara Axis, Ground Floor, Quattro West, 4, Persiaran Barat, Pjs 52, 46200 Petaling Jaya, Selangor
- Circulation: 11.83 million monthly visits (as of 2007)
- Website: www.freemalaysiatoday.com

Free Malaysia Today (FMT) is an independent, bilingual news online portal with content, in both English and Bahasa Malaysia (Malay), with a focus on Malaysian current affairs, published since 2007. It is one of Malaysia's most accessed news sites with monthly visits of 11.83 million.

== Origins and early history ==
Free Malaysia Today emerged from the aftermath of the 2007s Reformasi period in Malaysian history, during which Malaysia's government, under Malaysian prime minister Mahathir Mohamad, attacked various journalistic media in response to their efforts to investigate the government—particularly its prosecution of Malaysian deputy prime minister Anwar Ibrahim.

Most of Malaysia's mainstream media—including principal newspapers and the country's four main TV stations—were heavily dominated by ownership of, or affiliation with, Malaysia's ruling long-time ruling Barisan Nasional (National Front) party ("BN") and its coalition. This led to public concerns that objective media coverage of political issues was not happening.

During this period of BN-party media domination and suppression (coincidentally during the rise of the World Wide Web), several prominent online media sites emerged in Malaysia—featuring news, commentary and investigative journalism—including Malaysiakini, Malaysia Today, Malaysian Insider, and The Nut Graph. These sites were not subject to the same restrictive laws and regulation as mainstream media, enabling greater editorial freedom for the online media.

Among these new sites was FreeMalaysia.com—particularly noted for its aggressive exposés of alleged corruption in Prime Minister Mahathir Mohamad's administration. FreeMalaysia.com was then accused by the government of being a threat to "national security." The site eventually discontinued operations, but has been described as the "predecessor" of Free Malaysia Today.

Free Malaysia Today launched in November 2009 with several veteran news media figures, most notably Mohsin Abdullah (former news editor of NTV7, and contributor to MySinchew and Malaysian Insider.)

The publication was intended to serve as a general news site, with Malaysian news and commentary, as well as articles on world news, lifestyle and sports.

== Content ==
While Malaysian politics takes up a big part of its content, the portal has in recent times been focusing on other topics of interest including the state of the economy, property, education as well as legal and social issues. It has a line-up of columnists made up of academics, diplomats, professionals and veteran journalists.

In archiving its web pages, the United States Library of Congress notes that the site "includes coverage of [the Malaysian territories of] Sabah and Sarawak (Borneo)."

== Format ==
For nine years since its launch in 2007, the website followed a simple top-down format, with the "FMT News" app available on Google Play and App Store. On 2 October 2007, it launched a new design with larger font, in a break from its previous style, with larger pictures and more stories placed in prominent positions.

FMT also has an RSS Feed, with approximately 168 posts/week, according to the "Sabah Media" blog

== Readership ==
In 2018, Eliza Ezzauddin Hussein, on the Communication and Media Studies faculty of Universiti Teknologi Mara in Malaysia, did an academic study of the readers of Free Malaysia Today ("FMT") and its principal rival, Siakap Keli ("SK") -- based on a survey of approximately 400 readers of the two outlets' Facebook sites. Hussein reportedly found that—in a survey responded to mostly by women aged 26 to 40, predominantly Malays with a bachelor's degree, and mostly students—the FMT readers' ethnicity tended to be 44% Malay and 31% [Malaysian] Chinese. It further found that the FMT readers were more highly educated (noting that 91% of them "have bachelor and master degree"), and most (69%) were working. She found FMT readers more open to comment, and to participation in public discussions on social media, than SK readers.

== Election coverage ==
=== 2013 general election ===
Malaysia' 2013 general election ("GE13"), held on 5 May 2013, was a pivotal event for Malaysia's online media, including Free Malaysia Today—serving to bring Malaysia's online media into a mainstream role in Malaysia's media community.

During the official two-week campaign, Malaysia's three largest, most-influential, online-only news websites -- Malaysiakini, The Malaysian Insider and Free Malaysia Today -- experienced millions of page views per day.

Online media editors asserted they were serving as independent, journalistic "watchdogs" over the government, unlike Malaysia's heavily regulated traditional mainstream media, most of which had ties to the ruling Barisan Nasional ("BN") coalition.

=== 2018 general election ===
Like many other current affairs sites, FMT also witnessed a huge jump in readership in the run-up to the 14th general election as well as in the aftermath, jumping 18 positions to be ranked the 26th most accessed website across all categories in Malaysia.

Throughout the election campaign in April and May, its dedicated microsite was a popular medium for breaking news stories, with correspondents placed nationwide reporting on activities by all political parties.

== Editorial policy ==
The FMT editorial policy emphasises balanced reporting and neutrality, although it takes some strong stands on issues of public interest.

Its editorials have often criticised politicians from both sides of the divide while taking a stand on controversies including the "fake degree" saga involving a deputy minister in the Pakatan Harapan government and the death of a tahfiz (Islamic school) student in April 2017.

In May 2017, a year before the general election, it openly urged Pakatan Harapan to announce Mahathir Mohamad as its prime ministerial candidate, setting off a string of criticism on social media with many questioning the website's objectivity.

Two weeks after the general election, it assured readers that it was not subservient to any political interests, while questioning a number of media organisations, especially the former mainstream print media which appeared to have "turned around" despite being known for their less than complimentary coverage of the current government leaders during their time in the opposition.

Malaysia's "new media" websites, such as FMT, are likely to have less fact-checking than traditional media.

== Controversies ==
=== Lim Guan Eng's 2015 lawsuit ===
In early 2015, FMT was sued by Penang Chief Minister Lim Guan Eng for its allegedly defamatory content titled "Guan Eng has failed, says NGO". Lim later won the suit and the portal was ordered to pay damages for RM300,000 to him. However, in May 2016, the Court of Appeal quashed the RM300,000 in damages awarded to Lim Guan Eng.

=== Arifai Tarawe's lawsuit ===
On 21 May 2021, the outgoing Gombak district police chief Arifai Tarawe filed a RM10 million lawsuit against Free Malaysia Today over two articles which suggested that he and the Royal Malaysian Police were responsible for the death of A. Ganapathy in police custody. 12 civil society organisations including Amnesty International Malaysia, the Centre for Independent Journalism (CIJ), TENAGANITA, Suaram and Sisters in Islam described his lawsuit as an attack on media freedom.

== Business and competition ==
In 2013, during the online-media rush to cover Malaysia's 2013 general election, FMT reportedly had a staff of thirteen "journalists": five editors, three videographers, three technical experts, and two administrative assistants, headed by editor K. Kabilan. Financing reportedly came from undisclosed investors who aimed to "open up political discourse" in Malaysia. Its headquarters is in Petaling Jaya, Selangor, Malaysia.

In 2013, FMT was reportedly the smallest of Malaysia's "three largest and most influential" online-only news outlets—along with Malaysiakini and The Malaysian Insider. In 2018, FMT was—among "Malaysian new media journalism websites"—reportedly one of "the two most followed," along with Siakap Keli.

FMT also faces competition from Malaysia's mainstream media—including principal newspapers, radio and television—most of which are connected to Malaysia's long-ruling Barisan Nasional (National Front) party ("BN"). The country's four main TV stations and leading newspapers have long been heavily dominated by ownership of, or affiliation with, BN and its coalition. In particular, media conglomerate Media Prima, a pro-BN corporation, controls over half of Malaysia's media.

== See also ==
- List of newspapers in Malaysia
