= List of scandals in Malaysia =

The following is a list of reported scams and scandals in Malaysia since independence. These include political, financial, corporate and others. Entries are arranged in reverse chronological order by year. The year is the one in which the alleged scam was first reported or came into public knowledge.

In 2020, Najib Razak was convicted for his involvement in the 1MDB scandal and was sentenced to prison in 2022, making him the first former prime minister of Malaysia to be found guilty of corruption.

== Notable scandals ==
Notable scandals in Malaysia
Fake halal meat scandal in Malaysia	2020		The fake halal meat scandal emerged in December 2020 following investigations into the importation and distribution of frozen meat with dubious halal status. Authorities investigated allegations that imported meat was being repackaged and falsely labelled as halal, including at a warehouse in Senai, Johor. Police said the suspected operation involved both local and foreign syndicates and investigated activities including the acquisition, storage, processing and smuggling of frozen meat, as well as alleged manipulation of import procedures. Contemporary media reports also alleged that improperly sourced imported meat had been passed off as halal and that government officials may have facilitated the operation.
MISC	2018	RM108.57mil	It was reported that the company had come under MACC's radar following allegations of abuse of power, corruption and false payment claims involving about RM109 million.
1Malaysia Development Berhad scandal	2010s	42 billion debt	1MDB scandal was a large corruption, bribery and money laundering scandal which began in 2009 in Malaysia but became global in scope and was exposed in 2015. It was as described as "one of the world's greatest financial scandals" and declared by the United States Department of Justice as the "largest kleptocracy case to date" in 2016. In 2015, Malaysia's then-Prime Minister Najib Razak was accused of channelling over RM 2.67 billion (approximately US$700 million) into his personal bank accounts from 1Malaysia Development Berhad (1MDB), a government-run strategic development company masterminded by Low Taek Jho. Dismissal of charges triggered widespread outrage among Malaysians, with many calling for Najib Razak's resignation. Among Najib's critics was politician Mahathir Mohamad, who later defeated Najib in the 2018 general election and returned to power. Anwar Ibrahim, a political leader in opposition to Najib, openly questioned 1MDB's credentials as early as 2010. He had told Parliament that, according to records held by the Companies Commission, the company "has no business address and no appointed auditor." According to its publicly filed accounts, 1MDB had nearly RM 42 billion (US$11.73 billion) in debt by 2015. Some of this debt resulted from a $3 billion state-guaranteed 2013 bond issue led by the American investment bank Goldman Sachs, which had been reported to have received fees of up to $300 million for the deal, although the bank disputes this figure. Nevertheless, Goldman Sachs was charged in a Foreign Bribery Case and agreed to pay over $2.9 billion in a settlement with the U.S. Department of Justice (DOJ). The Malaysian Conference of Rulers called for prompt investigation of the scandal, saying that it was causing a crisis of confidence in Malaysia. After the 2018 election, the newly elected prime minister, Mahathir Mohamad, reopened investigations into the 1MDB scandal. Malaysian Immigration Department barred Najib and 11 others from leaving the country, while the police seized more than 500 handbags and 12,000 pieces of jewellery estimated to be worth US$270 million from property linked to Najib. Najib was charged with criminal breach of trust, money laundering and abuse of power, while Low Taek Jho (commonly referred to as Jho Low), was charged with money laundering. The U.S.Department of Justice pursued its own investigation into 1MDB, alleging that more than US$4.5 billion was diverted from 1MDB by Jho Low and other conspirators including officials from Malaysia, Saudi Arabia and the United Arab Emirates. Najib was subsequently found guilty of seven charges connected to SRC International, a dummy corporation associated with 1MDB, and was sentenced to twelve years imprisonment. In September 2020, the alleged amount stolen from 1MDB was estimated to be US$4.5 billion and a Malaysian government report listed 1MBD's outstanding debts to be at US$7.8 billion. The government has assumed 1MDB's debts, which includes 30-year bonds due in 2039. As of 5 August 2021, in an ongoing effort to fight global kleptocracy, the U.S. Department of Justice recovered and returned a total of US$1.2 billion of 1MDB funds misappropriated within U.S. jurisdiction to the people of Malaysia, joining a list of several countries which have initiated recovery or that have already repatriated smaller recovered amounts.
Murder of Shaariibuugiin Altantuyaa	2006		Shaariibuugiin Altantuyaa was a murder victim who was either murdered by PETN and RDX explosives or was somehow killed first and her remains destroyed with explosive on 18 October 2006 in a deserted area in Shah Alam, near Kuala Lumpur. Her murder case is significant in contemporary Malaysian politics due to the alleged involvement of persons close to the former Malaysian Prime Minister, Najib Razak. The Shah Alam High Court originally acquitted Abdul Razak Baginda and meted out the death sentence to two of the accused, Chief Inspector Azilah Hadri and Corporal Sirul Azhar Umar, on 9 April 2009, wrapping up the 159-day trial. On 23 August 2013, Sirul and Azilah were acquitted by the Court of Appeal, sparking controversy. On 13 January 2015, the Federal Court overturned the acquittal of both individuals, finding them both guilty of murder and sentenced both of them to death. However, Sirul fled to Australia and efforts by the Malaysian authorities to extradite him were hampered by existing Australian legislation prohibiting the extradition of individuals to countries with the death penalty. After the Malaysian 14th general election marking a historic defeat for the ruling Barisan Nasional coalition, Prime Minister Mahathir Mohamad and some relevant parties including Altantuyaa's father have hoped for further investigations to find the motive of murder and bring justice to the case. Sirul said he was willing to reveal what really happened in the murder case provided he was given a full pardon to come back to Malaysia. On 16 December 2019, convicted killer Azilah Hadri has made an explosive allegation from death row in Kajang Prison – the order to kill Altantuya Shaariibuu came from former Prime Minister Najib Razak and the latter's close associate, Abdul Razak Baginda.
Perwaja Steel	1990s	RM9.9 billion in accumulated losses and liabilities by 1996	Perwaja Steel, a government-backed steel project established in 1982 as part of Malaysia's heavy-industrialisation programme, accumulated substantial losses and liabilities and became the subject of investigations into alleged financial irregularities and mismanagement. An internal audit disclosed in 1996 described the company as insolvent and unable to meet billions of ringgit in domestic and foreign borrowings. The government subsequently assumed responsibility for Perwaja's accumulated losses and liabilities as part of its restructuring and privatisation.
Maminco affair	1980s	RM253 million	The Malaysian government established Maminco Sdn Bhd to intervene in the international tin market through large purchases intended to support tin prices. The operation was conducted secretly and financed through borrowing from the state-owned Bank Bumiputra. The government disclosed the operation in Parliament in 1986 and reported losses of approximately RM253 million.
Pan-Electric Industries scandal	1980s		Pan-Electric Industries was a Singapore-based company that specialised in marine salvage work, and had 71 subsidiary companies, including hotel and property interests, with a market capitalization of S$230 million. The company collapsed in 1985 due to unsettled forward contracts, forcing the stock exchanges of both Singapore and Malaysia to shut down for three days. At its demise, the company had a total debt of S$480 million, and all its shares held by 5,500 shareholders were found to be worthless overnight. As of 2000, it remains the largest corporate collapse in Singapore's history, and the only instance where the Stock Exchange of Singapore (SES) had to close. The Malaysian Kuala Lumpur Stock Exchange was also forced to close for three days as a result. In the aftermath of the collapse, key people in the company such as Peter Tham, Tan Kok Liang, and Tan Koon Swan were prosecuted and given varying jail sentences. The collapse of the company shook public confidence in the SES, causing prices of stocks to plunge. New securities laws were introduced in March 1986 to ensure that stockbroking firms can protect themselves against credit risks.
Deposit-taking co-operative scandal	1980s	552,000 Depositors and RM1.5 Billion Involved	A year before the 1986 deposit-taking cooperatives (DTCs) scandal erupted, Consumers' Association of Penang (CAP) had already written to Jabatan Pembangunan Koperasi (JPK) to find out the control exercised over cooperatives and the protection given to depositors should a cooperative face financial trouble or a "run". CAP's investigations disclosed that malpractices in the cooperatives included directors using the cooperatives' funds to buy land which they owned or controlled at above market price. Directors were also making the cooperatives buy the shares they owned in private companies at above market value. The cooperatives also gave big unsecured loans to directors, their relatives or their companies. On 29 July 1986, CAP sent a memorandum on "The Need for Greater Control over Co-operatives" to Bank Negara Malaysia (BNM), the Ministry of Finance, JPK, and the Ministry of National and Rural Development. The memorandum pointed out that unless the Co-operative Societies Act 1948 was amended and cooperatives activities strictly regulated, depositors may lose billions. The DTCs fiasco which occurred the following month involved 24 cooperatives, 522,000 depositors and about RM1.5 billion in deposits. It was triggered by Koperasi Belia Bersatu Berhad (KOSATU) suspending payments to depositors who wanted to withdraw their savings in July 1986. The Essential (Protection of Depositors) Regulation 1986 promulgated on 20 July 1986 allowed BNM to freeze the assets of KOSATU and its key management and also to investigate into the affairs of the cooperatives. Other depositors became jittery and this led to a run on other DTCs. On 8 August 1986, the activities of 23 other cooperatives were also suspended. 17 accounting firms were then appointed to assist BNM in its investigations and to come up with a White Paper. The White Paper on the DTCs indicated that the 24 DTCs had by November 1986, together lost approximately RM673 million through mismanagement or fraud. The White Paper revealed that a significant number of cooperatives suffered from bad management, either due to lack of expertise or professionalism or through imprudent, and in some cases, corrupt management. This resulted in gross mismanagement of funds such as overinvestment in land and property, with nearly one-fifth of assets in housing development projects and fixed assets, some of which were purchased at the height of the property market. There was also over-commitment in loss making or non-income generating subsidiaries and related companies with as much as 42% of total assets committed in loans or capital investments in such companies. The cooperatives also suffered from speculative investments in shares. In certain cooperatives, incidents of fraudulent activities and conflict of interest led to imprudent lending of funds, including to directors and other interested parties. Many cooperatives did not have borrowing powers or exceeded them. A number of them invested in assets or projects without approval of the JPK, or specifically against the approval of JPK. In 1986, 5 directors of 3 DTCs were charged in court, and in 1987 a further 17 directors of another 5 DTCs were also charged. The refund to the depositors of the 24 DTCs was made possible through 3 types of rescue schemes. These rescue schemes had provided for a full ringgit-for-ringgit refund by way of cash or a combination of cash and equity. The rescue involved RM600 million in soft loans and commercial loans from Bank Negara Malaysia. BNM also paid RM15.6 million for professional fees incurred in the investigation and rescue exercise. In 1988, 7 other ailing DTCs were investigated. 3 were operating in Sabah and 4 in Peninsular Malaysia. One of the 4 in the Peninsula was the Federation of Housing Cooperatives Ltd, in which the Cooperative Central Bank had a 78% interest.
