= Najib Razak controversies =

Malaysian political controversies since 2009

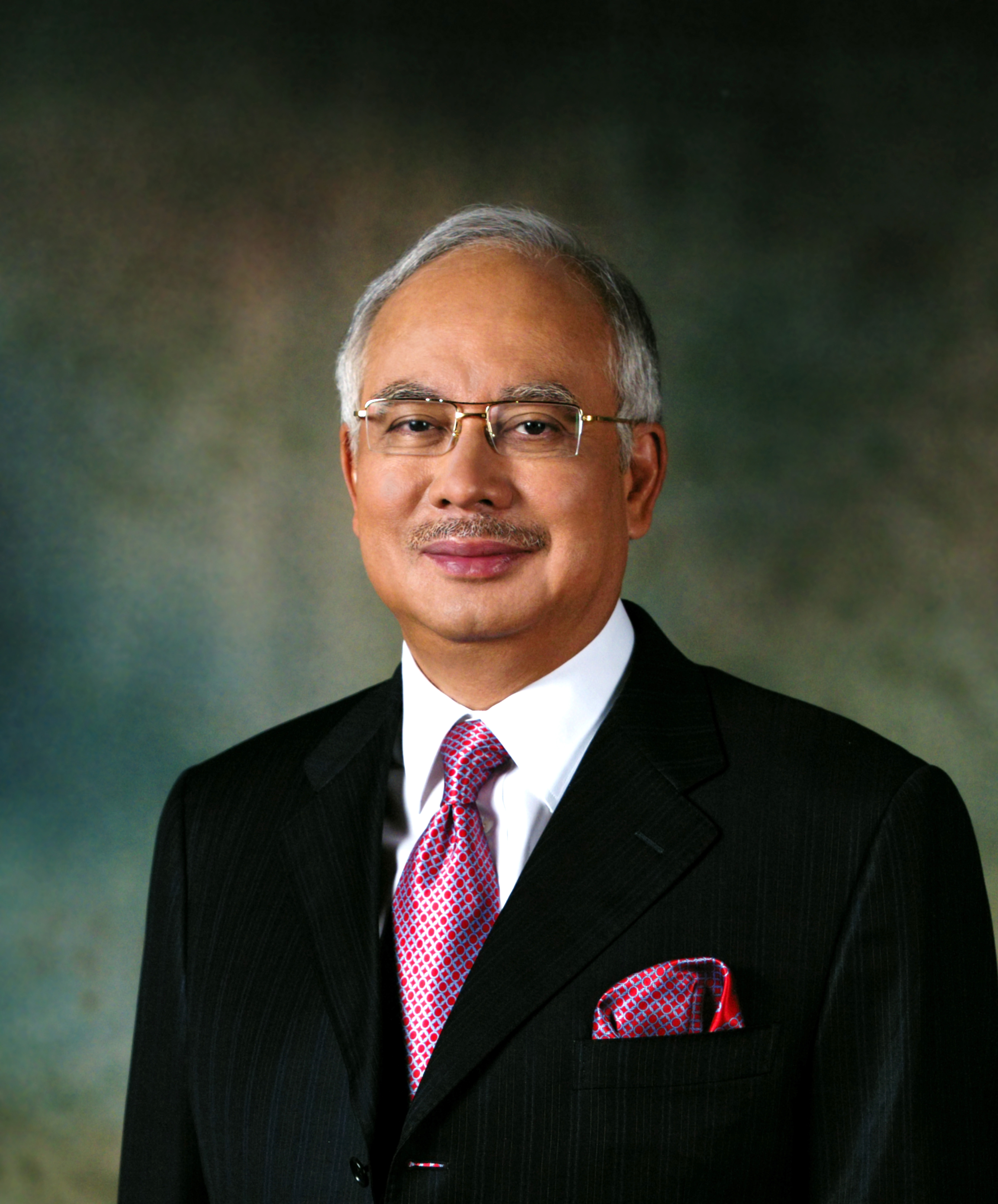
Najib Razak

Najib Razak served as the 6th Prime Minister of Malaysia from 2009 to 2018. The son of former 2nd prime minister Abdul Razak Hussein, his period of rule was marked by corruption, an extravagant lifestyle, and crackdown on free speech.

On 23 August 2022, Najib began serving a 12-year sentence in Kajang Prison for his role in the 1MDB scandal. On 2 February 2024, Malaysia's Pardons Board has announced that Najib's jail sentence for corruption has been reduced from 12 to six years.

== 1MDB scandal ==
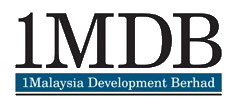
Logo of 1Malaysia Development Berhad

The 1Malaysia Development Berhad scandal (1MDB scandal) is a corruption, bribery and money laundering conspiracy in which the Malaysian sovereign wealth fund 1Malaysia Development Berhad was systematically embezzled, with assets diverted globally by the perpetrators of the scheme. As of 2026, legal proceedings and asset recovery efforts are still ongoing.

Although it began in 2009 in Malaysia, the scandal's global scope implicated institutions and individuals in politics, banking, and entertainment, and led to criminal investigations in a number of nations. The 1MDB scandal has been described as "one of the world's greatest financial scandals" and declared by the United States Department of Justice (DOJ) as the "largest kleptocracy case to date" in 2016.

A 2015 document leak reported in The Edge, Sarawak Report, and The Wall Street Journal showed that Malaysia's then-Prime Minister Najib Razak had channeled over RM (about US$) into his personal bank accounts from 1MDB, a government-run strategic development company. The alleged mastermind of the scheme, Jho Low, was central in the movement of 1MDB funds internationally through shell companies and offshore bank accounts. As of 2018, the DOJ found that Low and other conspirators including officials from Malaysia, Saudi Arabia and the United Arab Emirates diverted more than US$4.5 billion from 1MDB.

In September 2020, the alleged amount stolen from 1MDB was estimated to be US$4.5 billion and a Malaysian government report listed 1MDB's outstanding debts to be at US$7.8 billion. The government has assumed 1MDB's debts, which include 30-year bonds due in 2039. In August 2021, the United States recovered and returned a total of US$1.2 billion of 1MDB funds misappropriated within its jurisdiction, joining countries such as Singapore and several others that have also initiated recovery or that have already repatriated smaller recovered amounts.

On 26 December 2025, Najib was convicted on all 25 charges, sentenced to 15 years in prison and fined $2.8 billion by the High Court of Malaysia, but will appeal the judgement.

== Pahang logging scandal ==
On 26 October 1987, leader of the opposition, Lim Kit Siang, called for the Anti-Corruption Agency to investigate as to how Najib, who was Pahang MB, could give approval for a logging concession of 2000 acres to a resident of a low-cost housing estate. He asked ACA to investigate whether the logging concessionaire was in fact a nominee for Najib himself.

== LCS scandal ==
Najib has been implicated in the misappropriation of funds in the purchase of littoral combat ships (LCS). There is a perception that Najib was "the most powerful decision-maker" in the LCS procurement arrangements as he was both prime minister and finance minister at the time (April 2009). In 2022, Najib commented that the project was given to contractor Boustead Naval Shipyard Sdn Bhd because it was owned by the Armed Forces Fund Board (LTAT) and all profits of the project would thus go to the armed forces.

== Speech controversy against Chinese primary school ==
On 19 September 1990, Tan Chai Ho, chairman of the Federal Territory MCA Joint Committee, said he would collect controversial statements made by Najib since 1987 against Chinese primary schools. When Najib chaired the opening of the 1990 Education Conference organized by the Umno Youth League on September 15, he suggested that under the new education system, Chinese and Tamil primary schools should continue, but some subjects should use the Malay language.

== Murder of Altantuya ==
Mongolian model Altantuya Shaariibuu disappeared outside formerly a close associate of Najib, Abdul Razak Baginda's house on October 19, 2006, and was never seen again. Three weeks later, her remains were found in a forest in Selangor. In 2008, Abdul Razak was acquitted of abetment in the murder of Altantuyaa by the High Court, while Chief Inspector Azilah Hadri and Corporal Sirul Azhar Umar were found guilty in 2015 and sentenced to death.

In 2007, a Mongolian witness caused a stir in court when she revealed that Altantuya had been photographed having a meal with a Malaysian government official named 'Najib'. Detective P. Balasubramaniam also linking then Najib to Altantuya in a statutory declaration on July 3, 2008. Najib has repeatedly denied knowing Altantuya or that he had any part in her death.

On 16 December 2019, former police special action unit (UTK) personnel Azilah Hadri claimed he had acted on Najib's orders in a statutory declaration. Najib claimed the development to be a conspiracy aimed at putting him behind bars immediately as the offence of murder does not qualify bail. On 23 December 2019, Inspector-General of Police Abdul Hamid Bador said police were considering summoning Najib for questioning over the murder.

== Malaysia as an Islamic State ==
On 17 July 2007, Najib said Malaysia is an Islamic state and not a secular one. He said:

Islam is the official religion and we're an Islamic State - Malaysia.

But Islamic state does not mean we don't respect the rights of the non-Muslim.

The Muslims, the non-Muslims have the rights and we protect the rights of the non-Muslim.

Comments by Najib asserting the country has never been a secular state have upset many non-Muslims. His remarks drew ripostes from lawyers, opposition parties and religious leaders, who accused the government of ignoring Malaysia's history and constitution, that authorities finally ordered mainstream media to drop the subject.

== LGBT rights ==
The government led by Najib was vocally anti-LGBT and has been accused of using sodomy laws to slander and imprison political opponent Anwar Ibrahim for almost a decade.

In two speeches given in June and July 2012 to Muslim groups, Najib described gays as a "deviant culture" that had no place in Malaysia. In December of that year, Human Rights Watch decried Najib's remarks, saying that his "actions against LGBT people are a glaring contradiction to his self-proclaimed profile as a 'global moderate' leader." Those actions include shutting down a November 2011 sexual-diversity festival and a government programme to train people to "convert gays". And during the signing of the ASEAN Human Rights Declaration at the 21st ASEAN Summit in 2012, Najib deliberately excluded LGBT rights on the premise that the country has its own moral norms and values.

Under his administration, Information, Communications and Culture Ministry put up a play titled Asmara Songsang (Deviant Love). The play characterised LGBT individuals as predatory thugs and ended with lightning striking all individuals.

Najib made clear in a speech in August 2015 at an international Islamic moderation seminar in Selangor, that he believed Malaysia should not support LGBT rights. Najib stated that his administration will do its best to uphold human rights but only within the confines of Islam and that Malaysia cannot defend the more "extreme aspect of human rights", such as gay, lesbian and transsexual rights. This prompted Human Rights Watch to suggest that Malaysia withdraw from the United Nations if the government was not serious about upholding human rights for all.

In March 2017, the Film Censorship Board requested Disney to remove four minutes from the children's film Beauty and the Beast due to a perceived "gay moment."

== Quinoa diet ==
On 22 February 2018, Najib said he switched to the healthier quinoa after he was introduced to it by his son. He said:

I don't exercise often, I like to eat. My problem is that I love food, like most Malaysians. We love food. I have to control. For example, I don't eat rice, I eat quinoa, my son introduced me to quinoa. It comes from Peru, the Inca people planted it 3,000 years ago. It is protein-based, has less carbohydrate and less sugar. So it is better than rice.

His comment that quinoa was his substitute for rice has drawn criticisms from opposition politicians, who charged that he was out of touch with the masses.

Former Prime Minister Mahathir Mohamad wrote on Twitter that he only eats local rice. Another opposition leader, Lim Kit Siang, said "Quinoa which Najib eats is about 23 times more expensive than rice, eaten by 30 million Malaysians", and that the 14th general election would be "quinoa versus rice"; "a clean government versus kleptocracy; and Najib versus people of Malaysia." DAP lawmaker Lim Lip Eng claimed that Najib is out of touch with the hardship faced by Malaysians.

On 23 February, The Prime Minister's Office (PMO) clarified that quinoa was recommended by Najib's doctor, and he does not rely exclusively on it.

== RM1.69 billion tax case ==
The government through LHDN filed the suit against Najib on June 25, 2019, seeking total payment of RM1.69 billion for income tax arrears from 2011 to 2017, with interest at 5% a year from the date of judgment, as well as costs and other relief deemed fit by the court.

On 8 August 2019, Najib filed an application for a stay of proceedings of the IRB's suit. On 28 February 2020, the High Court dismissed Najib's application for a stay of proceedings of the IRB's suit seeking him to pay RM1.69 billion in income tax pending an appeal on the tax assessment to IRB.

On 22 July 2020, the High Court has ruled in favour of the Inland Revenue of Board (IRB) in a summary judgment by allowing it to collect tax arrears from Najib for the amount of RM1.69 billion.

On 6 April 2021, Najib says he has been served with a bankruptcy notice by the Inland Revenue Board. He said being a bankrupt would mean he would lose his parliamentary seat and will be ineligible to contest for party polls and national elections.

On 14 June 2021, The High Court dismissed Najib's application for a stay of execution of its order for him to pay RM1.69 billion owed to the IRB, ruling that all taxpayers are equal before the law.

== COVID-19 measure violations ==
On 6 May 2021, Najib was given two fines amounting to RM3,000 for failing to comply with standard operating procedures (SOPs) of the conditional movement control order (CMCO) at a restaurant. On 11 January 2022, the police opened an investigation into an event attended by Najib over claims that there was a breach of COVID-19 SOPs.

On 27 February 2022, Health Minister Khairy Jamaluddin said he will review a video depicting Najib purportedly violating COVID-19 SOPs during a campaign visit in Perling, Johor. On 10 March, Health Minister Khairy Jamaluddin revealed that his ministry had issued 42 compound notices for the violation of SOPs during the campaign period for the Johor election, including five to Najib.

== Dzulkefly Ahmad defamation case ==
On 31 December 2021, former health minister Dzulkefly Ahmad has filed a defamation suit against Najib following his allegations of nepotism and cronyism. He filed a statement of claim at Kuala Lumpur High Court, providing an August 24, 2020, Facebook post by Najib together with a Sinar Harian article dated January 28, 2019, as key evidence. Dzulkefly is seeking an injunction to prevent Najib from making further defamatory claims and a formal apology among other things from the high court and he is also claiming RM5 million in general damages.

On 3 February 2022, Najib has been told to file his defence by February 17 in a libel suit filed against him by Dzulkefly. According to a report by ''The Edge Markets'', the Kuala Lumpur High Court senior assistant registrar Nurul Izzah Hasan Basri directed Dzulkefly's lawyers during case management to file a reply to Najib's defence by March 3.

On 29 March 2022, Najib alleged the post on cronyism in his Facebook account is not referring to Dzulkefly. He said he was merely defending the Perikatan Nasional (PN) coalition in highlighting Pakatan Harapan (PH)'s hypocrisy in alleging nepotism, cronyism and political appointments with regards to posts made in government-linked companies (GLCs).

On 22 June 2022, lawyer SN Nair, who is representing Dzulkefly, said the case has been fixed for trial over four days in June 2024.

== Other controversies ==
- In 2013 Penang state election, BN organised a series of sponsored concerts, which were financially funded by Jho Low, a Penang-born businessman who was involved with the 1Malaysia Development Berhad (1MDB). The most famous of all was Psy's concert at the Han Chiang College on 11 February, days after the Chinese New Year. Just before Psy appeared on-stage, it was the Najib's turn to give a speech. Najib proceeded by repeatedly asking the crowd "Are you ready for Psy?" and the spectators responded "Yes". However, he next asked "Are you ready for BN?", which was met by a resounding "No!" from the crowd.
- On 1 February 2016, FinanceAsia has named Najib as the worst finance minister in 2016. The magazine said that 2015 had been a challenging year for the Malaysian economy, with a "double whammy" of the 1MDB scandal and the collapse in oil prices.
- In October 2018, in the Korean drama Terius Behind Me, Najib appeared for one second in a television news footage during a scene where National Intelligence Service (NIS) deputy chief Kwon Young-shil was receiving updates from her subordinate on NIS agent Kim Bon's activities. His television footage appearance is believed to have been from the time he was taken in for questioning at the Malaysian Anti-Corruption Commission (MACC).
- On 14 September 2020, Najib is listed on the MACC online database of corruption offenders convicted locally. His name at the top of the first page of the MACC Corruption Offenders Database.
- On 7 December 2021, The Court of Appeal has sternly reminded Najib that it is a court of law and not a coffee shop. The reminder came after the defence requested to postpone the hearing after the defence team came into casual contact with a lawyer who tested positive forCOVID-19.
- On 25 August 2022, Royal Lake Club Kuala Lumpur has removed Najib as its patron.
- On 22 July 2023, Consortium Zenith Beijing Urban Construction Group Sdn Bhd (CZBUCG) former senior executive director Ibrahim Sahari told the Sessions Court hearing the corruption trial of former Penang chief minister Lim Guan Eng that the RM2 million payment in 2017 to businessperson G Gnanaraja was meant to help a company executive get closer to Najib and to obtain future projects.

== See also ==
- Corruption in Malaysia
- The Kleptocrats (2018 film)
- Man on the Run (2023 film)
- Kleptocracy
- Murder of Shaariibuugiin Altantuyaa
- Unexplained wealth of the Marcos family
