= JJPTR =

Malaysian Ponzi scheme (2015–2017)

JJ Poor to Rich (commonly abbreviated as JJPTR; Chinese: 解救普通人; pinyin: Jiějiù Pǔtōng Rén; lit. 'Saving ordinary people') was a Ponzi scheme based in Penang, Malaysia that operated from 2015 until its collapse in April 2017. Marketed as a foreign-exchange trading programme, it promised investors a fixed monthly return of 20 percent on contributions of between US$25 and US$1,000. The scheme was founded by Lee Chong Sen, better known as Johnson Lee.

At its height, it was described as one of Malaysia's biggest "money game" operators, and its investors were reported to include people in China, Thailand, and other Asian countries. The Central Bank of Malaysia had placed JJPTR and related entities on its Financial Consumer Alert List in February 2017, and Singapore's Monetary Authority had placed the scheme on its Investor Alert List in August 2016.

In April 2017, the company claimed that its trading accounts was hacked and they had suffered loses of around $400 million. Police said they found no evidence that the accounts had been hacked. Malaysian authorities estimated that about 400,000 people had invested in the scheme, and that most of them did not recover their money. In May 2017, the authorities raided eight JJPTR offices in Penang, where Lee and two associates were arrested. In September 2017, they were charged with cheating, a charge that was later discharged not amounting to an acquittal. In 2018, Lee pleaded guilty to making a false declaration to the Companies Commission of Malaysia and was fined RM18,000, and in January 2024 the Federal Court upheld the forfeiture of more than RM11.3 million in cash and assets linked to him. He has since promoted other ventures such as cryptocurrency.

== See also ==
- List of Ponzi schemes
- List of scandals in Malaysia
