= Murder of Shaariibuugiin Altantuyaa =

2006 murder in Shah Alam, Malaysia

Murder of Shaariibuugiin Altantuya
- Court: Shah Alam High Court
- Decided: 9 April 2009

Court membership
- Judge sitting: Mohd. Zaki Mohd. Yasin

Keywords
- Murder

Shaariibuugiin Altantuya (Mongolian: Шаарийбуугийн Алтантуяа; sometimes also Altantuyaa Shaariibuu; (Note: In this Mongolian name, the given name is Altantuya. Shaariibuugiin is a patronymic, not a family name.) 6 May 1978 – 18 October 2006), a Mongolian national, was a murder victim who was either murdered by PETN and RDX explosives or was somehow killed first and her remains destroyed with explosives on 18 October 2006 in a deserted area in Shah Alam, Malaysia. Her murder case is significant in contemporary Malaysian politics due to the alleged involvement of persons close to the former Malaysian prime minister, Najib Razak, who was then the deputy prime minister.

The Shah Alam High Court originally acquitted Abdul Razak Baginda and meted out the death sentence to two of the accused, Chief Inspector Azilah Hadri and Corporal Sirul Azhar Umar, on 9 April 2009, wrapping up the 159-day trial. On 23 August 2013, Sirul and Azilah were acquitted by the Court of Appeal, sparking controversy. On 13 January 2015, the Federal Court overturned the acquittal of both individuals, finding them both guilty of murder and sentencing them to death. However, Sirul fled to Australia and efforts by the Malaysian authorities to extradite him were hampered by existing Australian legislation prohibiting the extradition of individuals to countries with the death penalty. Azilah's death sentence was eventually reduced to 40 years in jail and 12 strokes of the cane.

After the Malaysian 14th general election marking a historic defeat for the ruling Barisan Nasional coalition, then Prime Minister Mahathir Mohamad and other parties including Altantuya's father had hoped for further investigations to uncover the motives behind her murder in order to bring justice to the case. Sirul said he was willing to reveal what really transpired in exchange for a full pardon to return to Malaysia.

On 16 December 2019, convicted killer Azilah Hadri alleged from death row in Kajang Prison that the order to kill Altantuya Shaariibuu came from former Prime Minister Najib Razak and his close associate, Abdul Razak Baginda.

== Background ==
Shaariibuugiin Altantuyaa

Altantuya was born in 1978. She and her sister were raised in the Soviet Union, where Altantuya attended first grade in elementary school. She was reportedly fluent in Mongolian, Russian, Chinese and English, and knew some French.

Altantuya moved back to Mongolia in 1990 and a few years later married a Mongolian techno singer named Maadai. They had a child in 1996 but the marriage ended in divorce with the child being sent to live with Altantuya's parents. Despite training as a teacher, Altantuya briefly relocated to France to attend modelling school before returning to Mongolia. Her mother however, has said that her daughter had never worked as a model, to her knowledge.

Altantuya remarried and had another child in 2003, but the second marriage also ended in divorce. The second child was also put in the care of Altantuya's parents. She worked as a translator and often travelled out of Mongolia to countries like China, Singapore and Malaysia. Records indicate that she visited Malaysia at least twice; the first time in 1995 and the second in early 2006.

=== Relations to Najib Razak ===
It was alleged that she was introduced by then-Malaysian deputy prime minister Najib Razak to Abdul Razak Baginda, defence analyst and founder of the Malaysian Strategic Research Centre, at an international diamond convention in Hong Kong, though both parties have denied this version of events. This ensued with her having an affair with Baginda while accompanying him to Paris to work as a translator during his negotiations to purchase Scorpène-class submarines from France for the Malaysian government. In December 2007, Hong Kong-based news website Asia Sentinel published a series of photographs showing Altantuya sightseeing in France, coinciding with the time the deal for the Scorpène-class submarines was being brokered.

In April 2005, Raja Petra Kamaruddin, editor of Malaysia Today, published an explosive article entitled "Let's send the Altantuya murderers to hell" alleging the involvement of several high-ranking Malaysian politicians in the murders. Then prime minister Abdullah Ahmad Badawi was accused of burying military intelligence reports incriminating Najib Razak and his wife, Rosmah Mansor, for political leverage. Kamaruddin then went on to sign a Statutory Declaration (SD) declaring that Mansor was present at the scene of the crime, alongside two military officials who were placing the explosives. Najib Razak has consistently and vehemently denied all allegations on the basis of never having met Altantuya, going so far as to perform an Islamic oath of condemnation (sumpah laknat) numerous times. Kamaruddin was charged under the now repealed Internal Security Act, which allowed detention without trial. He was released and fled the country in 2009 to evade subsequent arrest. He retracted these allegations in April 2011.

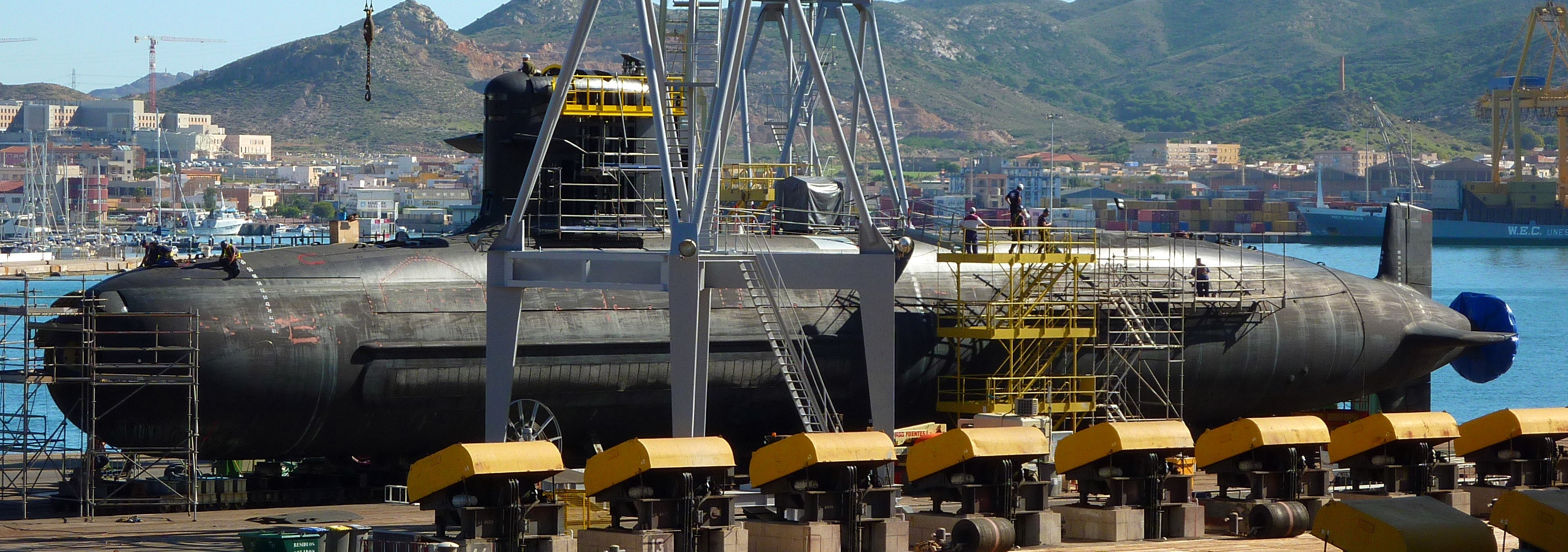
Royal Malaysian Navy's submarine prior to delivery

According to reports by the French newspaper Libération, Altantuya found out that one of the parties involved in negotiations, French company Armaris, paid out a 114 million euro commission for the deal (reportedly one billion euros or RM4.7 billion) for the purchase of three submarines. The commission was credited in the accounts of a company controlled by Baginda, Perimekar. A letter written by Altantuya recovered after her death shows that she had been blackmailing Baginda, seeking US$500,000 to remain silent about her knowledge of the deal. SUARAM secretariat, Cynthia Gabriel, commented that the Paris Courts have "extended its investigations with circumstances that led to Altantuya's death". However, the French Courts were not investigating the murder of Altantuya as it was focused on the alleged corruption within the DCNS with regards to the sale of the Scorpène submarines, but would deliberate on the murder in the course of the inquiry. On 25 June 2012, a French police investigation revealed that there were no immigration records of an "Altantuya Shaariibuu" entering France from 1999 to 2006. The same report noted instead the entry of a Shaariibuu Bayasgalan, who bore similarities to, but was not conclusively identified as Altantuya, also noting that Najib's entourage might have entered France through diplomatic channels as there was evidence of his presence but no corresponding immigration record. During the trial of Altantuya's death, Baginda told investigators that he had travelled with her to France in 2005. Records seized by French investigators from DCNS's former financial chief described Altantuya as Baginda's translator. On the other hand, Rosana Weili, the director of Perimekar, claimed that the negotiations were conducted in English as the French negotiators spoke English, downplaying Altantuya's involvement. Rosana also had "no knowledge of anyone by the name of Altantuya" in the negotiation team.

== Murder ==
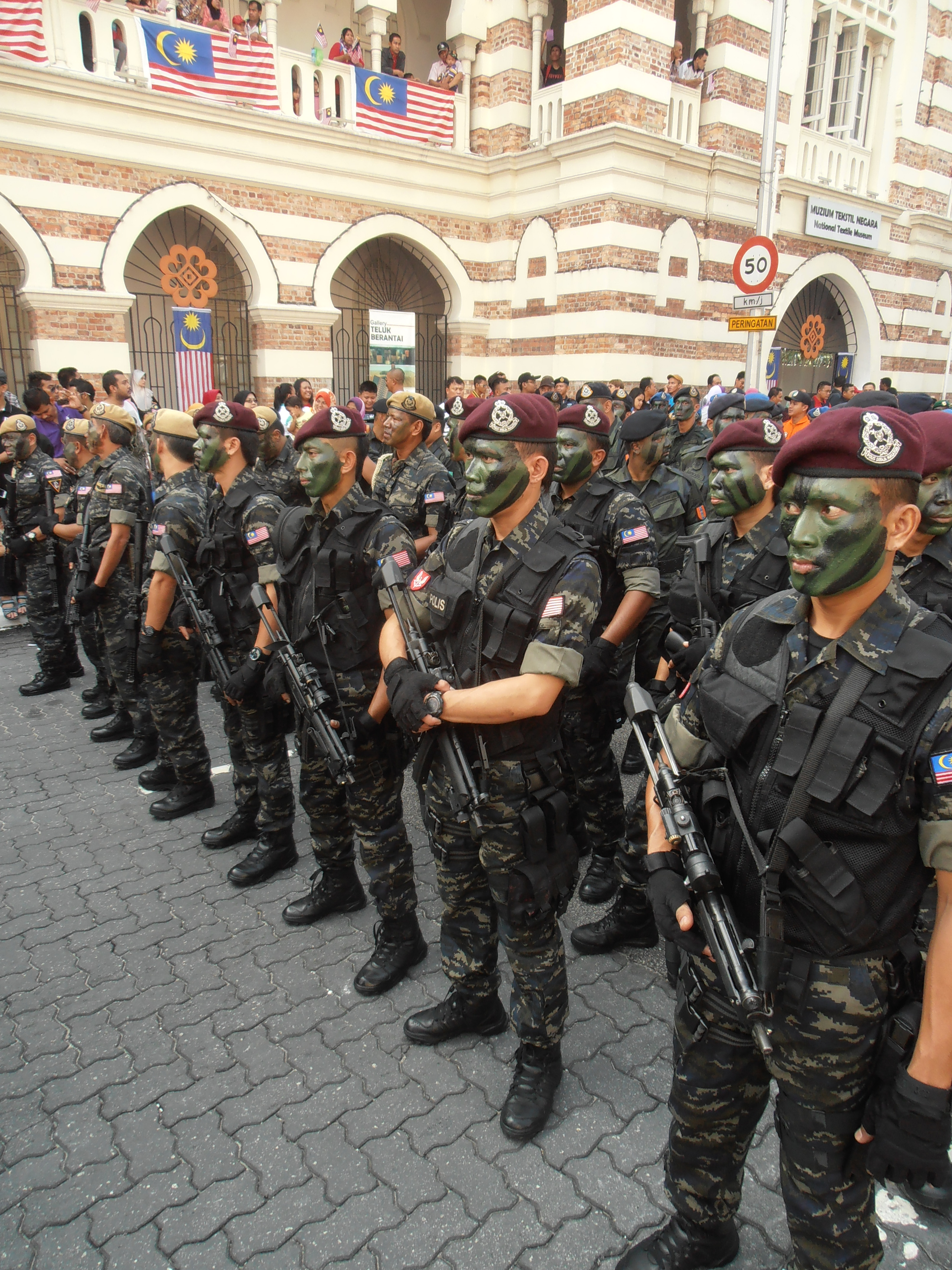
Special Actions Unit (with Maroon Beret), to which Azilah Hadri and Sirul Azhar Umar had belonged

After it was realised she was missing, her cousin lodged a police report on 19 October 2006, and sought help from the Mongolian embassy in Bangkok. A paper trail involving Altantuya's personal diary and earlier police reports filed against Razak Baginda stating she feared for her life led Malaysian investigators to single him out. A private investigator he hired to follow Altantuya, P. Balasubramaniam (also known as P. I. Bala), told police that he witnessed Altantuya being forced into a vehicle by unknown men on the night of 19 October 2006.

Investigators traced the vehicle back to the police department, with subsequent analyses of phone logs incriminating Chief Inspector Azilah Hadri. During interrogation, Azilah implicated the involvement of his subordinate, Corporal Sirul Azhar Umar, in the murder. They had been members of the elite Special Actions Unit (Malay: Unit Tindakhas) and were both assigned as bodyguards, to the office of the Prime Minister, Abdullah Ahmad Badawi.

In November 2006, both men led police to the murder site near the Subang Dam in Puncak Alam, Shah Alam, where fragments of bone were recovered — later verified through DNA analysis as Altantuya's. Blast kinetics revealed that military-grade explosives were used to dismember her corpse. Despite widespread speculation that C-4 explosives were used, 'C-4' was never mentioned in the formal charges put forth by the prosecution. The PETN and RDX recovered from the explosives are common constituents of both military plastic explosives (like C-4 and Semtex) and certain industrial explosives.

Having gathered sufficient evidence linking him to the murder, Razak Baginda was then arrested on 7 November 2006 and formally charged with abetment on 16 November 2006.

== Trial and verdict ==
=== Trial ===
According to court testimony by Altantuya's cousin Burmaa Oyunchimeg, Altantuya had shown Burmaa a photograph of 3 persons taking a meal together: Altantuya, Razak Baginda, and a government official. When questioned by the lawyer of the victim's family, Karpal Singh, Burmaa identified the official as then Deputy Prime Minister, Najib Tun Razak.

On 22 July 2008, Karpal Singh, who also held a watching brief for the victim's family, filed a notice of motion to call 4 new witnesses, including Datuk Seri Najib Tun Razak, to testify in the trial, as well as seeking to recall the first prosecution witness in the trial, private detective P. Balasubramaniam, for further examination. According to Karpal, Najib's testimony would be able to introduce fresh evidence to the case, and his requests were justifiable as per Section 425 of the Criminal Procedure Code (CPC), which allows a court to "summon or recall any person as a witness in a trial", as well as "summon or recall any such person if his evidence appears to the court to be essential to the just decision of the case." On 23 July 2008, the petition notice was rejected by the High Court. The High Court judge, Mohd Zaki, stated that "only the parties involved, namely the prosecution and the defence" had a right to submit the petition.

=== Acquittal of Abdul Razak Baginda ===
On 31 October 2008, the High Court acquitted Abdul Razak Baginda of abetment in the murder of Altantuya, with the prosecution saying they would appeal the acquittal. As of March 2009, the appeal had yet to transpire. However, 13 years later at a court hearing in the civil case brought against former policemen Azilah Hadri and Sirul Azhar Umar, as well as Najib and the Malaysian government by Altantuya's father, incriminating evidence emerged against Baginda. The court was told in May 2022 that on the day of her disappearance, Altantuya had made a police report in which she suggested that authorities "look for Razak Baginda" if anything should happen to her.

=== Defence and witness ===
Chief Inspector Azilah Hadri and Corporal Sirul Azhar Umar were ordered to enter their defence and testify under oath. On 10 November 2008, it was announced that the murder trial was to be postponed to January 2009 to allow the defence more time to prepare and gather witnesses. The witnesses sought included Malaysia Today editor, Raja Petra Kamarudin and private investigator, P. Balasubramaniam, who was untraceable at that time.

The request by the defence counsel for Sirul Azhar and Azilah to get statements from all prosecution witnesses was rejected with the reason given that "witness statements recorded under Section 112 of the Criminal Procedure Code is privileged". This would have included the witness statement of Deputy Prime Minister Datuk Seri Najib Razak's former aide-de-camp DSP Musa Safri, which would have been used to rebut Razak Baginda's affidavit.

On 3 February 2009, Sirul Azhar pleaded with the court to not pass the death sentence on him, as he was like "a black sheep that has to be sacrificed" to protect unnamed people who have never been brought to court or faced questioning. "I have no reason to cause hurt, what's more to take the life of the victim in such a cruel manner... I appeal to the court, which has the powers to determine if I live or die, not to sentence me so as to fulfil others' plans for me."

=== Death sentence ===
On 9 April 2009, High Court Judge Zaki Yasin ruled that Sirul Azhar's and Azilah's statements were "unbelievable" as both of the accused only blamed each other. Both policemen were sentenced to death for the murder of Altantuya. Wrapping up the 159-day trial, Zaki said both of them failed to raise any reasonable doubt in the prosecution's case. However, their lawyers planned to file an appeal. Both policemen showed no emotion when they heard that they were sentenced to be hanged until dead. Their family members accepted the court's decision and denied any political elements in the verdict. The two policemen appealed their sentence in late August. The Court of Appeal fixed the date of their appellate hearing for 10 June 2013.

The lawyers of Altantuya's father, Shariibuu Setev's, applied for a review of the Attorney-General's decision not to appeal Abdul Razak Baginda's acquittal. The application was set to be heard at the High Court on 8 July 2009. Dr. Shariibuu later withdrew the application but said he would still proceed with the claim against Abdul Razak, Azilah, Sirul Azhar, and the Government of Malaysia for damages over Altantuya's death.

Sirul and Azilah were acquitted on 23 August 2013 by the Court of Appeal. Several reasons were given for the acquittal such as the failure of the prosecution to provide a strong motive for the two men to murder the victim and the failure to call for the cross-examination of Najib's aide Musa Safri and Najib Razak. The acquittals drew the derision of Altantuya's father, and many Malaysians.

The prosecution immediately made an appeal to the Federal Court over the acquittal of Azhar and Sirul, which was heard on 23 June 2014. The Federal Court overturned the acquittal of both individuals on 13 January 2015, finding them both guilty of murder, sentencing both of them to death.

=== Sirul's escape to Australia ===
After the Federal Court's ruling however, Azilah was the only one to return to prison, as it was discovered that Sirul did not show up during the appeal hearing and was believed to have fled to Australia. The Inspector-General of Police, Tan Sri Khalid Abu Bakar, made an extradition request to Australia for Sirul, but faced difficulty as Australian law does not allow for the extradition of individuals to another jurisdiction if they could be sentenced to death. Sirul was detained by Australian immigration authorities in Brisbane, Queensland, on 20 January 2015 after an Interpol red notice was issued for his arrest. However, Australia's non-refoulement obligations meant that Sirul could not be deported back to Malaysia due to his pending death sentence and he remained indefinitely in Villawood Immigration Detention Centre until November 2023 when a High Court ruling on another asylum seeker case (NZYQ v. Minister for Immigration, Citizenship and Multicultural Affairs & Anor) ruled the indefinite detention of asylum seekers to be unlawful. Released on basis of that ruling, Sirul remains out of custody in Australia as of November 2023.

In December 2023, the Australian authorities were considering the proposal to enact new immigration detention laws, which may allow the Australian penitentiary system to detain high-risk offenders formerly held in immigration detention. As such, Sirul faces the possibility of returning to prison, but his case is still undecided as of December 2023.

=== Finding the motive of murder ===
Three years after the Federal Court found both policemen guilty of murder and sentencing them to death, Dr Shaariibuu Setev, the father of Altantuya, made a report to request the police to reopen the case of the murder as his lawyer Ramkarpal Singh said that the motive of the murder needed to be investigated and who ordered the killing be brought to justice.

Prime Minister Tun Dr Mahathir Mohamad, who led Pakatan Harapan to defeat Barisan Nasional in the 14th General Election on 9 May 2018, said the murder case should be reopened and agreed that it warranted further investigation.

After the 2018 election, Mongolian President Khaltmaagiin Battulga asked Dr Mahathir Mohamad to help bring justice in the murder case of Altantuya while Malaysian political leader Anwar Ibrahim said Sirul should face a new trial as the judges' ruling was compromised and the reluctance of the judges to call relevant witnesses made a mockery of the law.

=== Azilah's re-trial application ===
On 8 December 2020, Azilah had lost his appeal, in which he sought a re-trial and review of his conviction and sentence. The Federal Court of Malaysia dismissed the appeal as they found the case did not carry any breach or miscarriage of justice to warrant a review. This appeal was Azilah's final legal attempt to escape from the death penalty, and its failure effectively finalized Azilah's death sentence, confirming the former police officer to hang on a later date for Altantuya's murder. In September 2023, Azilah was transferred from Kajang Prison to Sungai Buloh Prison, where he was incarcerated on death row as the prison's last condemned inmate.

=== Commutation of Azilah's death sentence ===
Three years after Azilah lost his appeal to the Court of Appeal, while he was still incarcerated on death row, the Malaysian government announced in October 2018 that they would abolish the death penalty, although they later revised their stance and finalized their plan to make the death penalty discretionary and it would no longer be mandatory for all offences. The mandatory death penalty was eventually repealed in April 2023, and under the revised laws, anyone convicted of murder would face either the death sentence or a lengthy jail term ranging between 30 and 40 years, and 936 out of over 1,000 people left on death row had appealed to reduce their death sentences at the Federal Court of Malaysia. Azilah was one of the inmates who had filed an appeal for re-sentencing by the Federal Court, and this application is currently pending. However, Sirul did not apply for a review of his death sentence, but a police spokesperson stated that the Attorney-General's Chambers might possibly go ahead with applying to review Sirul's sentence in his absence, in order to facilitate Sirul's extradition back to Malaysia to face justice.

In November 2023, it was reported that Azilah had simultaneously applied to the state pardon board as a final recourse to escape the death sentence.

On 10 October 2024, despite the prosecution's arguments for the death sentence to stand, the Federal Court commuted Azilah's death sentence to the second-highest penalty of 40 years' imprisonment and 12 strokes of the cane. Altantuya's father reportedly wrote a letter, expressing his support for the reduction of Azilah's death sentence.

== Lawsuit of Altantuya's family ==
Altantuya's family filed a lawsuit seeking damages for the death of Altantuya. Azilah, Sirul, Abdul Razak Baginda and the Malaysian government were named as the four defendants in this lawsuit, although during the hearing, Abdul Razak chose to remain silent and refused to testify under oath. On 11 July 2024, High Court Judge Vazeer Alam Mydin Meera ruled that all the four accused should pay RM5 million in damages to the family of Altantuya. Justice Vazeer also drew an adverse inference from Abdul Razak's decision to remain silent, and found that Abdul Razak, who was the only link between the deceased and both Azilah and Sirul (who did not know the victim), had played a "complicit" role and was ought to be considered culpable for the murder. He additionally ruled that Abdul Rzak had a case to answer for allegedly soliciting both Azilah and Sirul to unlawfully cause the death of Altantuya. Azilah and Sirul had no objection to the lawsuit, while the government sought to appeal against the compensation order.

== Controversies ==
=== Statutory declaration by Raja Petra ===
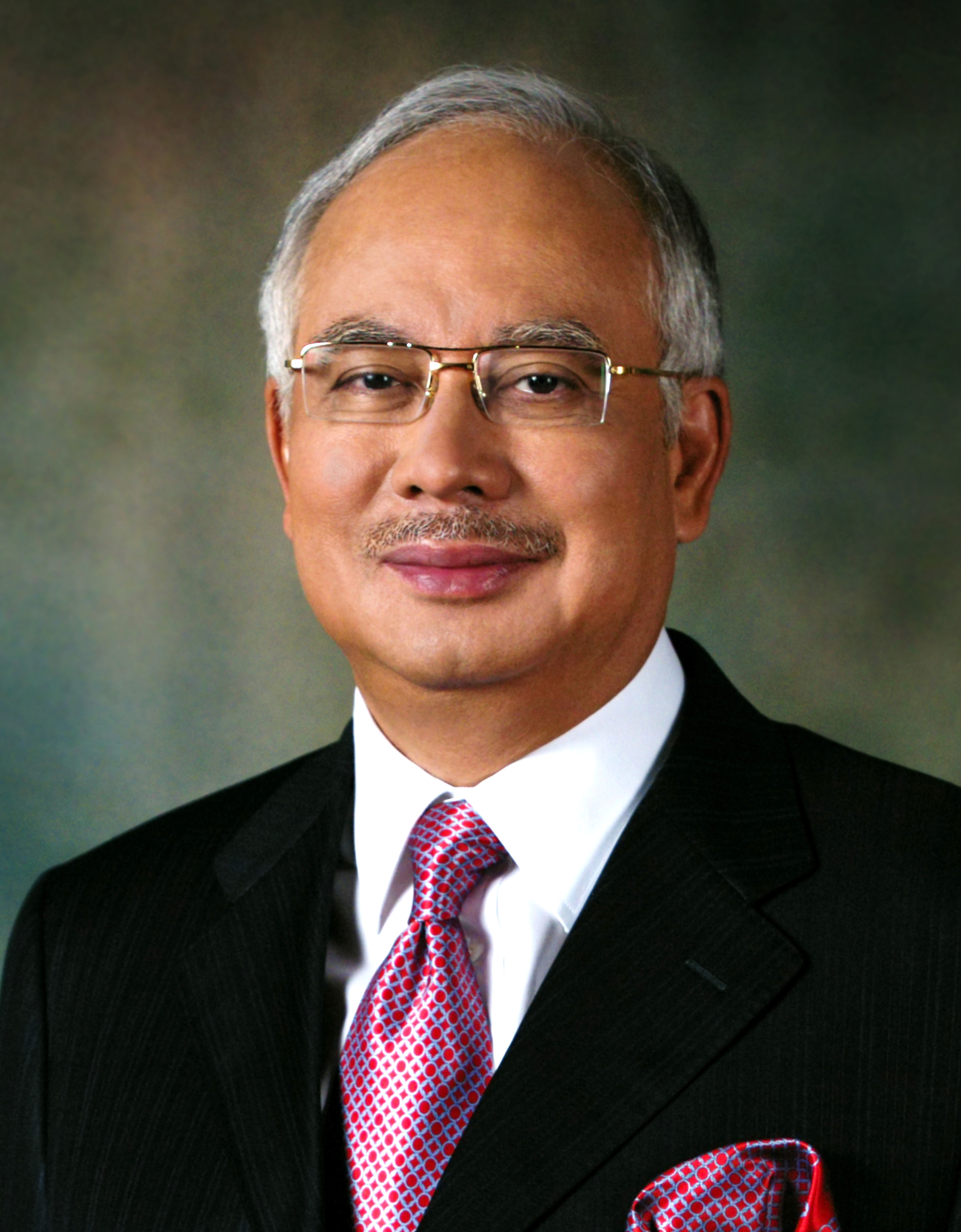
Najib Razak, former Prime Minister of Malaysia

In a statutory declaration in his sedition trial in June 2008, Raja Petra said that he was "reliably informed" that Rosmah Mansor (the wife of Malaysia's Deputy Prime Minister, Najib Razak) was one of three individuals who were present at the crime scene when Altantuya Shaariibuu was murdered on 19 October 2006. He wrote that Najib's wife, Rosmah Mansor, and Acting Colonel Abdul Aziz Buyong and his wife, Norhayati, Rosmah's aide-de-camp, were present at the scene of the murder and that Abdul Aziz Buyong was the individual who placed C4 plastic explosive on Altantuya's body and blew it up. Dr Shaariibuu Setev, the father of Altantuya Shaariibuu, has asked the police to conduct a thorough investigation into an allegation by Raja Petra saying the police should look seriously into the allegations as it might provide them with fresh evidence in their case.

In retaliation, the two people named in Raja Petra's statutory declaration on 18 June 2008, Lt-Col Abdul Aziz Buyong and his wife Lt-Col Norhayati Hassan, as having been present at the murder scene of Mongolian Altantuya Shaariibuu are suing Raja Petra for defamation. Abdul Aziz is seeking an apology from Raja Petra to be published in certain websites and newspapers, the removal of the statutory declaration from his blog and damages of RM1 million. Raja Petra's counsel, J. Chandra, later insinuated that the article titled "Let's send the Altantuya murderers to hell" on 25 April under Raja Petra's byline was posted without his consent or knowledge.

Raja Petra appeared to have distanced himself from the statutory declaration in a television interview with TV3, saying its accusations linking Najib Razak and Rosmah Mansor to the murder were repeating information passed onto him by opposition figures, rather than information he knew to be true himself. He appeared to have stated that he did not genuinely believe that Rosmah was at the murder scene. The Malaysian Civil Liberties Movement alleged that the interview had been heavily edited and spin doctored in favour of Prime Minister Najib Razak just in time for the upcoming Sarawak state elections. Raja Petra also denied that he did not believe Rosmah was at the scene saying that the interview was "chopped up". He also later clarified and pointed out that he had always been consistent in relation to the statutory declaration, saying that he had never directly accused Rosmah of being at the scene of the murder, merely repeating what was told to him.

=== Statutory declaration by P. Balasubramaniam ===
A second statutory declaration was filed on 1 July 2008 by Abdul Razak Baginda's private investigator P. Balasubramaniam, disclosing then deputy Prime Minister Najib's links to Altantuya. Bala said the police omitted information about the relationship between Najib and Altantuya during their investigation. In the statutory declaration Abdul Razak had told Balasubramaniam that the deputy prime minister had a sexual relationship with Altantuya and that the trio had dined together in Paris. Detailed conversations in a statutory declaration revealed that Abdul Razak had in effect inherited Altantuya as a lover from Najib, who passed her on because he did not want to be harassed as a deputy prime minister. Among other lurid details, Balasubramaniam described text messages between Najib and Abdul Razak in which the latter was asking for help to avoid arrest, implying Najib personally interfered with the murder investigation. In making his statutory declaration, Balasubramaniam mentioned that a man in a blue Proton Saga happened to be driving past the home of defense analyst Abdul Razak Baginda at that time of the day before Altantuya was reported missing on 19 October 2006 and revealed that the man was Nasir Safar, the special advisor to Najib Razak.

Former deputy Prime Minister, Anwar Ibrahim, has called for a Royal Commission of Inquiry to look into the case. However, the RCI has not been convened on this issue.

It has been claimed that Balasubramaniam's allegation on the involvement of Najib Razak on the murders of Altantuya could have political motivations, as the press conference for the allegation was made at the national PKR Headquarters.

=== Retraction and disappearance ===
The following day Balasubramaniam retracted the statutory declaration he made on 1 July 2008 and proffered a second statutory declaration that erased all traces of allegations that referred to Deputy Prime Minister Najib Razak and Altantuya Shaariibuu's murder. There were accusations that this new statutory declaration could have been due to intimidation or inducement, and was done not on his own free will. This was supported by Bala's first lawyer Americk Singh Sidhu saying that he was not able to get in touch with Bala despite repeated phone calls to Bala's cell phone. The Malaysian police said on Sunday 6 July that they have asked Interpol to help find the private investigator who had been reported missing since making explosive claims linking the deputy premier to a murder. Bala's nephew filed a missing person's report saying the investigator and his family had disappeared. It was discovered on 10 July that Balasubramaniam's house in Taman Pelangi had been broken into. Balasubramaniam was said to have taken refuge in a neighbouring country with his wife and children.

It is assumed that Bala was running away because he either received death threats or a bribe from Najib.

=== Reappearance and retraction of second statutory declaration ===
After his reappearance, Bala claimed that he signed the second statutory declaration without even reading it, claiming he was threatened. Bala also said that a member of Najib's family, Najib's younger brother Nazim Abdul Razak, teaming up with Deepak Jaikishan, a businessman with connections to Najib Razak's family, made Bala withdraw his first statutory declaration and offered him RM5 million to do so, but that his first declaration was true. Balasubramaniam has declined to meet the Malaysian Anti-Corruption Commission in Singapore to give his testimony about allegations surrounding the murder of Altantuya Shaariibuu as he has made his personal security a prerequisite for his testimony. The MACC also wanted to classify all correspondence between Balasubramaniam and it as ‘secrets’ under the Official Secrets Act, which according to Bala's lawyer was the subject of disagreement.

Bala continued to reiterate that the first statutory declaration he signed was the truth. He actively campaigned for the Malaysian opposition giving talks on Najib and Rosmah's alleged role in the death of Altantuya until his eventual death by heart attack on 15 March 2013.

=== Deepak Jaikishan ===
Malaysian businessman Deepak Jaikishan in the later part of 2012 held several press conferences regarding his role in the retraction of Balasubramaniam's first statutory declaration and the supposed coercion in making Bala sign the second declaration. He also made damning accusations against Prime Minister Najib Razak and his wife Rosmah Mansor, implying they were the ones giving instructions and had prior knowledge of coverup of the first statutory declaration. He further revealed that it was the Prime Minister's brother Nazim Abdul Razak who paid off Balasubramaniam. In a biography launched on 19 March 2013, Rosmah Mansor denied any involvement with the murder of Altantuya, stating that she was attending a special session with the Islamic Orphans Welfare Association on the day in question, and describing the accusations against her as "slander".

Deepak has also made claims denying that he is not currently being sponsored by the Malaysian opposition Pakatan Rakyat or its leader Anwar Ibrahim, despite claims by certain parties that he is. Deepak has expressed regret in being involved in the Altantuya affair. Anwar has continually denied that he is behind the recent exposes by Deepak. The revelations came at the same time Deepak was involved in a lawsuit against the government and governing party UMNO in a land deal case. He also said that the Malaysian Anti-Corruption Commission is more interested in ignoring this matter rather than starting an investigation.

He made further references to the lawyer duo who were involved in drafting the second statutory declaration, implying they came from the law firm of Zul Rafique & Partners of Kuala Lumpur. It was later inferred to the Malaysian Bar Council by several parties, including activist Haris Ibrahim and Robert Phang that the lawyer duo was Tan Sri Cecil Abraham and his son. The Bar Council has promised to begin investigations into the drafting of the second statutory declaration. Bala's lawyer, Americk Sidhu, revealed in Bar Council investigation hearings that Cecil Abraham confirmed to him that he was the one who drafted Bala's second statutory declaration under instructions from Najib himself. A professional misconduct complaint was to be lodged against Cecil Abraham by the Bar Council, where under the Legal Profession Act he could be reprimanded, fined and suspended from practice for up to five years.

=== Sirul Azhar ===
Sirul Azhar, the former police commando, who was convicted for the murder of Altantuya, revealed during his detention in Australia that he was under orders to kill Altantuya and that the real murderers were still free. He also mentioned that Najib's aide-de camp Musa Safri and his superior should have been made to testify during the murder trial. Sirul's claims have been immediately rubbished by Najib and Inspector General of Police Khalid Abu Bakar. The opposition has asked Najib to explain why he was asserting that Sirul's claims were "total rubbish".

In January 2016, Sirul Azhar denied that Najib Razak was involved in the murder case. Upon his release from detention in November 2023, Sirul claimed that his former lawyer paid him around $200,000 to absolve Najib, which the lawyer denied.

=== Further revelations ===
A lawyer for Chief Inspector Azilah Hadri said the type of explosives used in the murder of Mongolian national Altantuya Shaariibuu is not in the stock of federal police headquarters Bukit Aman. “Azilah's log record from Bukit Aman shows that he was only issued with a Glock pistol and magazines. In addition, both Sirul and Azilah are not trained to handle explosives and bombs such as the C4.

In an investigative news report 101 East by Al Jazeera, an interview of a purported relative of Sirul called 'Frank' claimed that Sirul mentioned to him that Razak Baginda was the person who shot and killed Altantuya. The documentary also alleged that the then-Deputy Prime Minister Najib Tun Razak had an extramarital affair with the victim prior to her death. The Australian journalist Mary Ann Jolley, who wrote the report, was deported from Malaysia on 14 June 2015 by the Malaysian authorities, alleging she had tarnished Malaysia's image. Following the airing of the documentary on 10 September 2015, the Malaysian Prime Minister's Department and the former Inspector-General of Police, Musa Hassan, both issued statements contesting the report's assertions.

In an interview with The Malaysian Insider, Abdul Razak Baginda claimed that Altantuya Shaariibuu was blackmailing him for amounts in the US$5,000 to US$8,000 range on personal matters, which prompted him to enlist Deputy Superintendent Musa Safri for help, and hire private investigator P. Balasubramaniam for protection. Altantuya was later murdered, allegedly under police custody of Sirul Azhar and Azilah Hadri. Both were convicted for the murder from the physical evidence found in Sirul's car, Sirul's house, and an account that they both were present at the hotel Altantuya stayed, and outside of Razak's house. Sirul denied Musa Safri's involvement, and Abdul Razak Baginda was acquitted of murder due to reasonable doubt raised from the record of 144 telephone calls and text messages made between him and Musa Safri. Abdul Razak Baginda also denied the murder was related to his submarine deal, and claimed P. Balasubramaniam's statutory declaration, that implicated the Deputy Prime Minister, was based on hearsay.

== See also ==
- Capital punishment in Malaysia
- 1Malaysia Development Berhad scandal
- Najib Razak controversies
