= Maminco affair =

Malaysian government intervention in the international tin market in the early 1980s

The Maminco affair was a secret intervention by the Government of Malaysia in the international tin market in 1981 and 1982. The operation was conducted through Maminco Sdn Bhd, a company established to purchase physical tin and tin contracts with the objective of supporting international tin prices and protecting Malaysia's tin-mining industry.

Maminco's purchases were financed through credit provided by the state-owned Bank Bumiputra Malaysia Berhad. After the intervention resulted in substantial losses, the Malaysian government assumed responsibility for repaying the bank loans. The existence and purpose of the operation were not publicly acknowledged until several years later.

In November 1986, Primary Industries Minister Lim Keng Yaik disclosed details of the operation in the Dewan Rakyat. Contemporary reports put the gross losses associated with the operation at approximately RM660 million, although the government argued that part of the economic cost had been offset by increased export duties, taxes, interest income and other benefits resulting from temporarily higher tin prices.

The affair also became associated with Makuwasa Securities and Makuwasa Jaya, two companies subsequently established using funds remaining in Maminco's accounts in an attempt to recover or reduce the losses.

== Background ==
Malaysia was one of the world's largest producers and exporters of tin during the twentieth century. International tin prices were regulated partly through the International Tin Agreement, under which producer and consumer countries attempted to stabilise prices through export controls and a buffer stock operated by the International Tin Council.

By 1981, the Malaysian government was dissatisfied with international tin prices and with the operation of the international price-support arrangements. The government regarded declining prices as a threat to Malaysia's mining industry and to the employment and livelihoods dependent upon it.

The Malaysian government subsequently decided to intervene directly in the market by purchasing tin. The operation was not publicly disclosed at the time.

== Maminco ==
Maminco Sdn Bhd was incorporated in 1981 and became the vehicle through which the Malaysian intervention was conducted. It purchased tin and tin contracts in the international market, including through the London Metal Exchange (LME). The operation involved the commodities trading firm Marc Rich & Co.

The purchases were intended to increase or support international tin prices. Large-scale Malaysian buying initially contributed to an increase in tin prices.

The operation was financed through credit facilities provided by the government-owned Bank Bumiputra Malaysia Berhad. In his 1986 statement to Parliament, Lim Keng Yaik stated that the loans used to finance Maminco had subsequently been repaid by the Malaysian government.

== Failure of the intervention ==
The price-support operation ultimately failed to maintain tin prices at the targeted level.

The Malaysian government's 1986 explanation attributed the failure in part to changes in London Metal Exchange rules concerning defaults on delivery contracts, which it argued weakened the effectiveness of the Malaysian strategy.

Other accounts have identified additional factors, including increased tin production encouraged by higher prices and sales from the United States government's strategic tin stockpile. These developments increased available supply and undermined attempts to sustain higher prices.

Maminco was left with substantial losses from its trading activities and was unable to meet its obligations to Bank Bumiputra without government assistance.

== Losses ==
The amount lost through the operation has been reported using different measures.

In November 1986, the Malaysian government disclosed losses of approximately RM660.5 million from the Maminco operation. The government argued, however, that the net economic cost to Malaysia was substantially lower because temporarily higher tin prices had generated additional government revenue and wider economic benefits.

Lim Keng Yaik told Parliament that benefits attributed to the intervention included increased tin export duties, additional tax revenue, increased export receipts and interest received by Bank Bumiputra on its lending to Maminco.

The government maintained that these benefits offset a substantial part of the trading losses and defended the intervention as an attempt to protect the Malaysian tin industry and the livelihoods of mine workers.

== Makuwasa ==
Following the losses, the government attempted to recover or reduce the financial cost of the operation.

In his November 1986 parliamentary statement, Lim Keng Yaik said that the remaining money in Maminco's accounts was used to establish and operate two companies, Makuwasa Securities and Makuwasa Jaya. The government's intention was that profits earned by the companies would be returned to the government.

The financing and operation of Makuwasa subsequently became controversial. Opposition members questioned the relationship between Maminco, Makuwasa, Bank Bumiputra and the Employees Provident Fund (EPF), including the allocation of shares to Makuwasa through arrangements involving the EPF.

The government maintained that Makuwasa had been established as part of its effort to recover losses arising from Maminco and denied that public officials had personally benefited from the arrangements.

== Public disclosure ==
The Maminco operation remained largely undisclosed to the Malaysian public for several years.

Details became the subject of increasing political controversy during the mid-1980s. In 1986, the government publicly acknowledged the intervention and provided an explanation of the operation and its losses in Parliament.

The disclosure generated extensive parliamentary debate. Opposition MPs questioned the secrecy of the operation, the use of Bank Bumiputra financing, the government's repayment of Maminco's debts and the subsequent arrangements involving Makuwasa.

The government defended the intervention as a measure undertaken in the national economic interest. Lim Keng Yaik stated that the objective had been to protect the tin-mining industry and the welfare of workers dependent upon it.

== Aftermath ==
The Maminco affair occurred during a period of increasing instability in the international tin market.

In October 1985, the International Tin Council became unable to meet its financial obligations, causing trading in tin on the London Metal Exchange to be suspended. The subsequent collapse in tin prices severely affected producers internationally, including Malaysia.

The Maminco operation subsequently became a prominent controversy in discussions of Malaysian government intervention in commercial markets and the use of state-owned financial institutions during the 1980s.

== See also ==
- Economic history of Malaysia
- First premiership of Mahathir Mohamad
- Bank Bumiputra Malaysia Berhad
- 1985 tin crisis
- International Tin Council
- Perwaja Steel
- List of scandals in Malaysia
