= P. Balasubramaniam =

Malaysian police officer and private investigator

Perumal Balasubramaniam (2 June 1960 – 15 March 2013), also known as P. Balasubramaniam and PI Bala, was a Malaysian police officer who garnered notoriety as the crown witness in the murder of Altantuya Shaariibuu in Shah Alam, Selangor. He was a former member of the Special Branch Police Office (PDRM), and before that he served on Abdul Razak Baginda's payroll as a security officer, private investigator and possibly henchmen. He became a controversial figure, after he retracted the statement he made in a sworn affidavit.

== Statutory declaration 1 ==
Balasubramaniam asked lawyer Americk Singh Sidhu for help in drafting his first statutory declaration. On 1 July 2008, the statutory declaration was made before the Commissioner of Oaths, Dr. T. Yokheswarem. Both Balasubramaniam and Yokeheswarem were born and raised in Slim River, Perak. On 3 July 2009, Balasubramaniam made a press conference in the headquarters of PKR in Petaling Jaya announcing his statutory declaration. In his SD, he accused the Prime Minister in the direct involvement in the murder of Altantuya a Mongolian national. The first SD was drafted with the help of Americk Singh Sidhu. Also attending the Press Conference is the opposition leader Anwar Ibrahim and Shamsul Iskandar Md. Akin.

== Statutory declaration 2 ==
On 4 July 2009, a second statutory declaration was held in Prince Hotel, Kuala Lumpur. Balasubramaniam stated that Deepak Jaikishan and a Malay VIP at The Curve, Damansara. The meeting was held outside a Volkswagen showroom on 3 July 2008. However, there is no evidence that this meeting ever took place. And it solely depends on the word of Balasubramaniam. He later then said that he was offered RM 5 Million to retract the statutory declaration.

== Running away ==
After the Press Conference in Price Hotel, Balasubramaniam disappeared. Americk Singh failed to contact Balasubramaniam. Sivarasa has a strong feeling that Balasubramaniam was bribed.

In Bangkok, ASP Suresh Kumar was said to have called Balasubramaniam from Kuala Lumpur so that police officers from Malaysia cannot catch him. Balasubramaniam then switched to the Hotel Beverly Hills. Deepak arranged the hotel expenses, approximately 100,000 baht. As Balasubramaniam's visa could not be renewed in Thailand, Deepak urged him to leave Bangkok as the Malaysian police were after him. From Bangkok's International Airport, Balasubramaniam and his family flew to Kathmandu. They then stayed in Yak & Yeti Hotel for 10 days. Visa arrangements to India was made by the Indian Embassy in Kathmandu. Balasubramaniam later flew to New Delhi for two nights.

He flew to Madurai and later to Madras. His visa expired on 21 August 2008. His wife and children were sent back to Kuala Lumpur to live with Balasubramaniam's mother-in-law in Segambut. ASP Suresh Kumar and Deepak Jaikishan reportedly visited Balasubramaniam in Chennai. Balasubramaniam stayed illegally in India because his visa was expired. The visa was later extended until 5 September 2009 with the help of the Exco of Karaikal, India, who happened to be his wife's uncle.

Balasubramaniam then ordered his nephew, Kumaresan (27 years old) not to make any statement to the media and not to hold a candle light vigil for him. Kumaresan made a police report in Brickfields Police Station. Accompanying him was the M.P. for Kapar, Manikavasagam Sundram.

Balasubramaniam's disappearance was noticed at 17:54. In another press conference, Americk said the second statutory declaration was forced. A police report was made so that his name as a lawyer can be cleaned. Americk claimed he did not represent any political party although the press conference was held at PKR headquarters. Americk later then discussed with ASP Tony so that they can investigate the disappearance of Bala. The Internal Minister, Datuk Seri Abdul Hamid Albar stated the public need not fear for the safety of Bala.

During his hiding in India, Balasubramaniam returned to Malaysia three times in 2009 using the Malaysia-Thailand border at Bukit Kayu Hitam. He met his wife and kids in Segambut, without Deepak's knowledge. His kids were sent to be schooled in Sentul, Kuala Lumpur. Now, his wife and kids are in Chennai.

== Balasubramaniam is back with the third statutory declaration ==
P Balasubramaniam's return to Malaysia cause as much controversy as his disappearance. He made a statement saying that his return is not only to dispose of the second SD, but also to ensure Barisan Nasional will not be the government after the 13th Malaysian General Election. This SD will be almost the same as the 3rd SD.

According to a statement made by P. Balasubramaniam's lawyer, Americk Singh Sidhu, the third instalment of the SD will be released soon. The credibility of P.Balasubramaniam as a witness is questioned by not only the pro-government supporters but also from the opposition. In addition apart from his SD, he will also swear on a Hindu holy book to show that he is telling the truth.

=== Political motivated return ===
P.Balasubramaniam has also made a statement that his return is purely political and his goal is to ensure that the Pakatan Rakyat will win the next general election. He also said that even though he is an ex-police officer, he has never supported the Barisan Nasional government and he will do his best to contribute to the opposition.

== RM50,000.00 and Altantuya ==
Before Altantuya Shariibugin's death, Abdul Razak Baginda made a withdrawal of RM50,000.00 cash and gave it to P. Balasubramaniam so that the latter can give it to Altantuya. P. Balasubramaniam did not give the money to Altantuya. The payment was said to be Altantuya's payment for her work with Abdul Razak Baginda. Altantuya was supposed to take the money and leave Malaysia, and all these fiasco can be avoided. Because she did not receive any payment, Altantuya stayed longer than she was supposed to, starting a chain of events that resulted in her death.

== Death ==
In an exclusive interview with Malaysiakini, Balasubramaniam claimed he was fighting to ensure that justice would prevail, adding that "the man upstairs and the spirit of the murdered Mongolian woman still needed him to continue with his crusade". On 28 February 2013, Balasubramaniam made a press conference that he was back to find justice for Altantuya, but also to help Pakatan Rakyat win the 13th General Election.

In early March 2013, doctors diagnosed Balasubramaniam with three coronary blockages, and scheduled him for a heart bypass. However, before the surgery could be done, he suffered a heart attack on 15 March and died at Sungai Buloh Hospital in Selangor, age 53. Balasubramaniam was cremated and his ashes given to his family members.
