= Deposit-taking co-operative =

Non-baking financial company in Malaysia

Deposit-taking co-operatives were a form of non-banking financial company (NBFC) in Malaysia. It started with Chinese Society but later several Malay co-operatives were set up. Some became insolvent which led to a run on banks in 1986. The Cooperative Central Bank and 23 other deposit-taking co-operatives had their assets frozen by the Malaysian central bank, Bank Negara Malaysia. Their crash caused a major political crisis when the government was requested to bail out risk-taking investors. The Malaysian cabinet eventually did approve a plan to reimburse the depositors in the failed co-operatives but the co-operative sector of the economy never recovered.

These institutions became identified as a type of pyramid scheme because of the need to continuously attract new depositors in order to meet obligations. Now, these schemes are outlawed and are known as Kuttu or get-rich-quick schemes. On October 20, 2008 Bank Negara Malaysia seized several more institutions: BuluhMas, Jazmeen (of Indian/Mamak origins), Noradz and Eastana Farms.

Officially, these deposit-taking co-operatives are subject to the financial acts governed by the Minister of Finance. Malaysia Companies house SSM have recently released the top 100 Co-ops list on their site for the public perusal. Organisations which are not banks or do not have Koperasi and Berhad in their name are not allowed to take deposits. Some only allow memberships from their own related company and may allow family members to join in (commonly known as Friendly Mutual in the UK).

== See also ==
- List of scandals in Malaysia
