= Raja Petra Kamarudin =

Malaysian blogger (1950–2024)

Yang Mulia Raja Petra Raja Kamarudin
- راج ڤيترا راج كامرودين
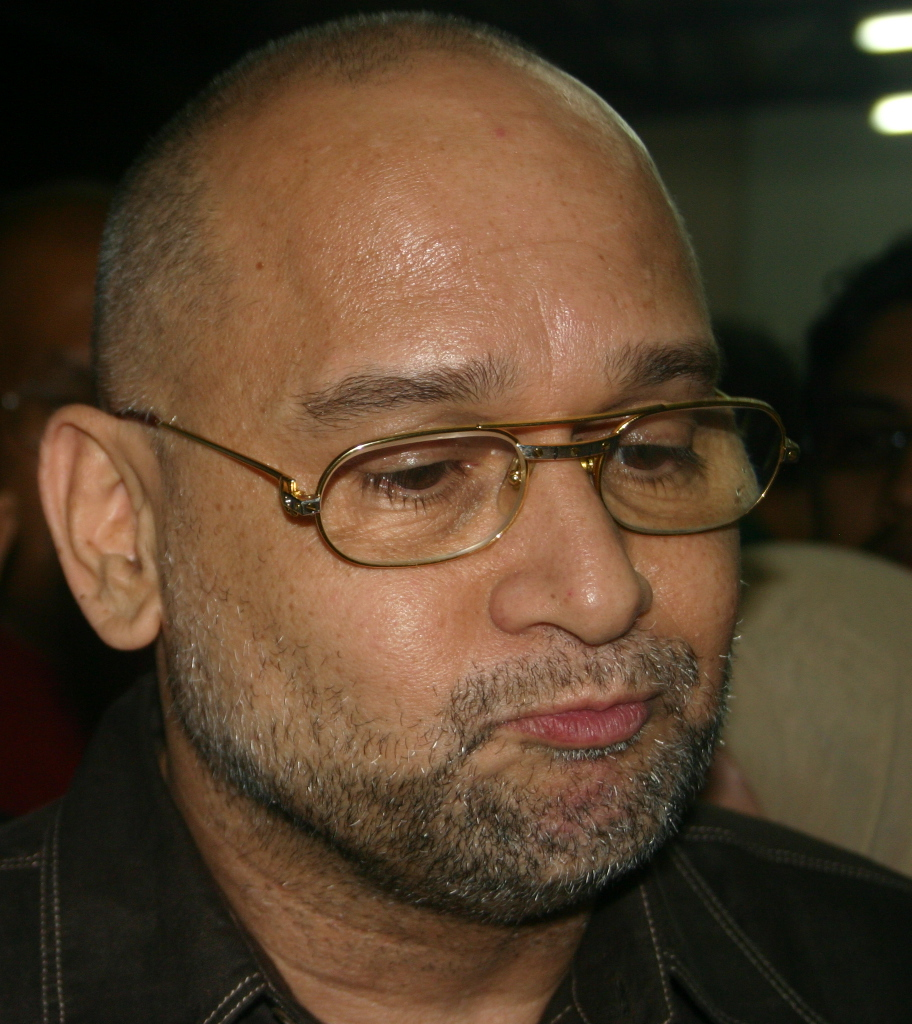
- Raja Petra in 2007

Personal details
- Born: Raja Petra bin Raja Kamarudin; 27 September 1950 Surrey, England
- Died: 9 September 2024 (aged 73) Manchester, England
- Resting place: Near Khizra Mosque, Cheetham Hill, Manchester, England
- Citizenship: United Kingdom; Malaysia
- Party: People's Justice Party (KeADILan)
- Other political affiliations: Barisan Alternatif (BA)
- Spouse: Marina Lee Abdullah (m. 1973)
- Children: 5
- Parents: Raja Kamarudin Raja Uda (father); Che' Bariya Kamarudin (Note: Née Barbara Mabel Parnell.) (mother)
- Relatives: Daeng Chelak
- Education: Alice Smith School; Malay College Kuala Kangsar; Victoria Institution
- Occupation: Blogger, politician
- Known for: Founder and owner of Malaysia Today

Raja Petra bin Raja Kamarudin (Jawi: راج ڤيترا بن راج كامرودين; 27 September 1950 – 9 September 2024), sometimes referred to by the initials RPK, was a Malaysian blogger and politician known for running the Malaysia Today website and publishing a series of controversial commentaries and articles on Malaysian politics in the website.

Kamarudin was detained for a second time under the Internal Security Act, at 1.10pm on 12 September 2008. On 7 November 2008, Raja Petra, 58, was freed from detention after Shah Alam city High Court Justice Syed Ahmad Helmy Syed Ahmad granted his habeas corpus petition and ruled that his detention was illegal. The court noted that "the grounds for the detention order by Home Minister Datuk Seri Syed Hamid Albar for the blogger did not fall under the scope of Section 8(1) of the ISA."

In May 2010, Cheras UMNO Division chairman, Syed Ali Alhabshee called on the government to strip Raja Petra of his citizenship on the grounds that his activities could affect the peace of the country. He resided in Manchester, England.

== Early life and education ==
Raja Petra was born in Surrey, England on 27 September 1950, Raja Petra was a member of the House of Opu Daeng Chelak. He was the nephew of the late Sultan Salahuddin Abdul Aziz Shah, the eleventh Yang di-Pertuan Agong (King) of Malaysia and the seventh Sultan of Selangor. His paternal grandmother Tengku Badariah was the elder sister of Sultan Hisamuddin Alam Shah, the second Yang di-Pertuan Agong and the eighth Sultan of Selangor. His paternal grandfather, Raja Tun Uda Al-Haj Bin Raja Muhammad, KBE (1894–1976), was twice Menteri Besar of Selangor during the colonial era, the second speaker of the Federal Legislative Council (1955–1957), the first Yang di-Pertua Negeri of Penang (1957–1967) and the first Malaysian High Commissioner to the United Kingdom (1953–1955). His father, Raja Kamarudin bin Raja Tun Uda (1924–1970), studied law in the UK and worked for Unilever until his death whilst his mother, Che' Bariya Kamarudin (née Barbara Mabel Parnell) (1932–1978), was Welsh.

Raja Petra Kamarudin was educated at the Alice Smith School. At the age of 13, he went to further his studies at the Malay College Kuala Kangsar, completing his education at the Victoria Institution. As his father died when Raja Petra was 20, he began to support his mother and three younger siblings by working as a rice distributor and motorcycle dealer, introducing Yamaha and other Japanese motorcycle brands to the country.

== Political involvement ==
Raja Petra was a leading member of the Parti Keadilan Nasional (KeADILan)—now known as the Parti Keadilan Rakyat (PKR)—the party set up in response to the arrest of former Malaysian deputy prime minister Anwar Ibrahim in 1998. On 11 April 2001, Raja Petra and ten other opposition activists were detained under the Internal Security Act (ISA) for allegedly plotting to overthrow then prime minister Mahathir Mohamad. He was released 52 days later.

Raja Petra started the Malaysia Today website and his blog to facilitate open discussion on Malaysia's political and social scenes. In his online writings, he was often humorous and sometimes critical of the current political developments in Malaysia. He advocated for transparency, accountability and justice in the Malaysian political system. He often denounced what he saw as deeply rooted money politics, corruption, and ethnic polarisation in Malaysia.

On 2 July 2008, Malaysia Today was defaced by a person known only as "Gasakdotnet", replacing the website with a superimposition of Mahathir Mohammad's face into the poster of the film We Were Soldiers accompanied by the tagline "My Countrymen, My Fellow Malaysians", alluding to Mahathir's "battle" for Malaysia as the Prime Minister from 1981 to 2003. Poor internet connectivity affecting several areas in Malaysia hampered efforts to restore the website promptly.

== Second ISA detention ==
Raja Petra filed a habeas corpus application at the High Court on 16 September 2008 seeking his release from detention under the ISA. On 22 September the Malaysian Home Minister Syed Hamid Albar signed an order to remand Raja Petra to the detention facility for up to two years under section 8 of the ISA. Ministerial orders for remand under section 8 cannot be challenged in court.

Raja Petra was held without trial under the ISA at the Kamunting Detention Centre in northern Perak state, which had 60 ISA detainees, mostly suspected Islamic extremists. The ISA permits an initial detention of two months for investigation, followed by a two-year jail sentence which can be renewed indefinitely. The 1948 ISA is a holdover from British colonial rule, intended for use against communist insurgents. Raja Petra's wife Marina Lee Abdullah said: "(Police) said my husband has been sent to Kamunting this morning and that he will remain there for two years with no trial. This is the worst news I can receive but we will keep fighting for his release. This is dirty foul play by the government as they know that we are in the process of fighting for his release in the court but I was expecting this. Raja Petra was detained for allegedly 'insulting Islam' and publishing articles on his website which has tarnished the country's leadership to the point of causing confusion among the people." Raja Petra's lawyer sought his release in a court hearing but this was dismissed. Raja Petra's detention caused widespread protests by civil society groups, lawyers and other online commentators.

Meanwhile, in Kota Kinabalu, the United Pasokmomogun Kadazandusun Murut Organisation (Upko) led by its Secretary-General Datuk Wilfred Madius Tangau, joined its three other Barisan Nasional (BN) counterparts MCA, Gerakan and MIC petitioning the Government review of the ISA. Madius said the party supports former de facto Law Minister Datuk Zaid Ibrahim's position that the ISA should only be used against those who posed a threat to national security, such as terrorists: "Clearly in the case of Seputeh MP, Teresa Kok, Raja Petra Kamaruddin and Sin Chew Daily reporter, Tan Hoon Cheng, there are so many other public order laws that can be used against them if, at all, there is a case to do so."

== Controversies and issues ==
=== Feud with Muhammad Muhammad Taib ===
On 23 July 2007, Muhammad Muhammad Taib, UMNO's Information Chief at that time, lodged a police report against Malaysia Today at 12.57 p.m. at the Tun H.S. Lee police station, under Section 121 (B) and Section 123 of the Penal Code, Section 4 of the Sedition Act 1948 and Section 263 and Section 266 of the Communications and Multimedia Act 1998, for an 11 July blog entry on the website deemed to contain writing that insult the Yang di-Pertuan Agong, degrade Islam and incite hatred and violence between local ethnic groups. Raja Petra Kamarudin responded by releasing an article on Malaysia Today, lashing back at Taib with allegations of hypocrisy and corruption. A second police report against Raja Petra was believed to be lodged after the release of the article, and Raja Petra was summoned to the Dang Wangi police station on 25 July 2007 for eight hours of questioning. His wife was also questioned for an hour.

After his release from questioning, Raja Petra gave his reason on why Muhammad Taib made a police report against him, stating the reason is that the government wished to silence the nation's bloggers before the Malaysian general election.

=== Universiti Utara Malaysia ===
Raja Petra made headlines in the end of March 2008 when a Malaysian High Court ordered him in and the group chief editor and editor of PKR's organ Suara Keadilan to pay a total of RM7 million to Universiti Utara Malaysia and its vice-chancellor Tan Sri Dr. Nordin Kardi for libel.

=== Altantuya Shaariibuu ===
==== Accusation of Najib Abdul Razak's involvement ====
Raja Petra was charged on 6 May 2008 with sedition for allegedly implying that the Deputy Prime Minister Najib Razak was involved in the sensational killing of a young Mongolian woman, Altantuya Shaariibuu. Also charged for sedition was businessman Syed Akbar Ali, who had allegedly posted a seditious comment on Malaysia Today.

Raja Petra Raja Kamaruddin, who did not deny that he linked Deputy Prime Minister Najib Razak to the slaying, pleaded innocent to the charge, and said he should have the right to hold the powerful accountable for wrongdoing. Raja Petra was taken to a detention center after he refused to post the bail of RM5,000. The court set the trial for 6 October 2008. If convicted, he faced up to 3 years in prison. "I am not posting bail. See you guys in October, I will be out for Christmas. Don't worry." His wife said she was "quite stunned" that Raja Petra refused to post bail, and said she thought he wanted to make a statement by not posting bail, which he reportedly felt he could not afford to. She launched a campaign to solicit donations of RM1 from the public for the RM5,000 bail, but called it off a few hours later after the campaign raised over RM35,000.

Several members of parliament from the opposition Pakatan Rakyat coalition were present at Raja Petra's hearing, with one, Nurul Izzah Anwar, calling Malaysia Today "the primary source of a lot of unearthing of scandals especially corrupt practices of the leadership and the government...it has helped [open] the eyes of the nation to what is going on and what is wrong with the country. It played a huge role in the last elections." On the same day, Lim Kit Siang raised the issue of Raja Petra's sedition charges in Parliament, arguing that Najib had personally intervened to ensure the Attorney-General would charge Raja Petra with sedition, and calling it an abuse of power.

Raja Petra's wife, Marina Lee Abdullah stated that "He is on a hunger strike. It is a protest. The last time he did this, his liver was damaged. I don't think he is going to last that long." Raja Petra also refused visits by family members. On his release, Raja Petra claimed that he had not, in fact, been on a hunger strike but was refusing to eat and drink for fear of being poisoned, as Chief Inspector Azilah Hadri and Cpl. Sirul Azhar Umar (on trial for the murder of Altantuya Shaariibuu) were being remanded in the same prison.

==== Statutory declaration ====
In a statutory declaration on 18 June 2008, Raja Petra accused Datin Seri Rosmah Mansor (the wife of Malaysia's Deputy Prime Minister, Datuk Seri Najib Razak) of being one of three individuals who were present at the crime scene when Altantuya Shaariibuu was murdered on 19 October 2006. The statutory declaration also mentioned that all information he obtained regarding the above allegations was contained in a Military Intelligence report received by Prime Minister Abdullah Ahmad Badawi, implying knowledge on the part of the Prime Minister.

Raja Petra later distanced himself from the statutory declaration in an interview with TV3, saying his accusations linking Najib and Rosmah to the murder were repeating information passed onto him by opposition figures, rather than information he knew to be true himself. He stated that he did not genuinely believe that Rosmah was at the murder scene. The Malaysian Civil Liberties Movement alleged the interview was heavily edited and spin doctored in favour of Prime Minister Najib Razak just in time for the upcoming Sarawak state elections. Raja Petra backed up this assertion during an interview with Malaysiakini.

=== Criminal defamation trial ===
On 16 July 2008, the Malaysian police obtained a warrant of arrest against Raja Petra for criminal defamation. This was due to his statutory declaration connecting Deputy Prime Minister Najib Razak's wife, Rosmah Mansor, saying she was present when Mongolian national Altantunya Shaariibuu's body was blown up. On 17 July, Raja Petra was charged with three counts of criminal intimidation over his statutory declaration on the murder of Mongolian translator Altantuya Shaariibuu. He is alleged to have defamed Deputy Prime Minister's wife Datin Seri Rosmah Mansor by making a libellous statement in the declaration which he affirmed on 18 June when he knew that it would tarnish her good name. He also faced similar charges against Kolonel Norhayati Hassan and her husband Acting Kolonel Abdul Aziz Buyong.

The trial of Raja Petra, who has been charged with defaming Datin Seri Rosmah Mansor and her two assistants, began in the Sessions Court on 26 May 2009. Raja Petra had sought an order from the High Court to refer the matter to the Federal Court on a constitutional point or to return the case to the magistrate's court for trial.

=== Mohamed Shafee Abdullah vs Raja Petra Raja Kamarudin ===
Prominent Malaysian lawyer, Muhammad Shafee Abdullah had filed suit against Raja Petra in August 2008 for RPK's posting on 6, 7 and 11 August of that year where three articles titled "Shafee Abdullah: Sodomologist Extraordinaire", "Money, Power and Sex: What Motivates Man" and "The Real Dalang Behind The Anwar Sodomy Allegation" was clear defamation against Shafee.

RPK had in reply, filed a statement of defence on 25 November 2008 denying that the three articles were false, malicious or defamatory of Shafee.

== Personal life ==
In 1973, he married Marina Lee binti Abdullah, an ethnic Chinese convert to Islam, with whom he had five children, which is Raja Suraya Raja Petra, Raja Azman Raja Petra, Raja Shahril Raja Petra, Raja Azmir Raja Petra and Raja Sarah Raja Petra.

== Death ==
Raja Petra died in Manchester, England on 9 September 2024, just short of his 74th birthday, due to a blood infection that spread to his lungs and liver.

== Bibliography ==
=== Books ===
- When Time Stood Still (2000) ISBN 9789834043506
- All in the Game (2001) ISBN 9789832530015
- From Prince to Prisoner (2001) ISBN 9789834052638
- The Reformasi Trail (2001) ISBN 9789834052614
- Khairy Chronicles – Khairy Jamaluddin: Rasputin or Boy-Genius? (2006) (Note: Even though the book was published without the author's name, it is known that Raja Petra was the author of this book.)
- The Silent Roar: A Decade of Change (2009) ISBN 9789830618470
