= Fake halal meat scandal in Malaysia =

Food scandal in Malaysia

The fake halal meat scandal of Malaysia was a corruption scandal involving the selling of fake halal meat in Malaysia over a period of 40 years, but was only discovered in December 2020. A local media investigation revealed that a meat cartel was smuggling meat from non-halal certified sources like Brazil, Bolivia, Canada, China, Colombia, Mexico, Spain and Ukraine. The meat being smuggled included horse, kangaroo and even pork meat which were mixed and sold as halal certified beef. The cartel bribed senior officials from a number of Malaysian government agencies. Several cartel members were arrested.

== Timeline ==
On 23 November 2020, Malay daily Sinar Harian reported that a freight company was importing non-halal certified meat and that authorities at several ports were turning a blind eye to the cargo. Additionally, it was reported that the cargo was brought in on falsified documents.

On 2 December, a raid on a warehouse uncovered a cartel in Senai, Johor where 1,500 tons of imported frozen meat worth RM30 million was seized. The warehouse was used for making fake labels and stamps, then repackaging and stamping the meat with the falsified labels. It was also found that the cartel was impersonating a well known meat supplier.

On 21 December, the New Straits Times reported that officials from at least four agencies were involved in aiding the cartel in its illegal practices, which had been going on for at least 40 years. The officials were bribed with cash and women for sexual services to turn a blind eye on the cartel's activities.

On 30 December, two directors of a Johor Bahru-based frozen meat company, Raihanah Cold Storage Sdn Bhd were charged with falsifying halal logos on transport vehicles.

By 4 January 2021, four suspects had been remanded to custody.

== Aftermath ==
The scandal triggered widespread alarm in Malaysia, where around 60% of the population is Muslim. Under Islamic law, Muslims are prohibited from consuming non-halal meat, and halal certification is widely relied upon as the assurance that these religious requirements have been met.

Malaysian opposition members castigated the Department of Islamic Development Malaysia (Jakim), saying the incident had tarnished the image of the Islamic halal regulators.

It was feared the scandal would have a negative impact on Malaysia's plans of becoming a global hub for the $2.3 trillion international halal market.
