= Perwaja Steel =

Malaysian steel company established in 1982

Perwaja Steel Sdn Bhd was a Malaysian steel company established in 1982 as part of the Malaysian government's heavy industry program. Originally known as Perwaja Terengganu Sdn Bhd, it was established as a joint venture involving the Government of Terengganu, the state-owned Heavy Industries Corporation of Malaysia (HICOM) and Japan's Nippon Steel. The company operated major steelmaking facilities at Kemaman, Terengganu, and Gurun, Kedah.

Perwaja was intended to reduce Malaysia's dependence on imported steel and became one of the major industrial projects associated with the first premiership of Mahathir Mohamad. The company subsequently experienced prolonged financial difficulties and required substantial government-supported financing and restructuring. Academic assessments have described Perwaja as one of the most costly failures among Malaysia's state-sponsored heavy-industrial projects.

The company was later privatised and eventually became part of the publicly listed Perwaja Holdings Berhad. Its steelmaking operations ceased in the 2010s after further financial difficulties.

== History ==
=== Establishment ===
Perwaja Terengganu Sdn Bhd was established in 1982 as part of Malaysia's heavy-industrialization program. It was a joint venture between the Terengganu state government, the government-owned Heavy Industries Corporation of Malaysia (HICOM), and Nippon Steel Corporation of Japan.

The project was intended to develop a domestic integrated steel industry and reduce Malaysia's reliance on imported steel. A steel complex was constructed at Kemaman, Terengganu.

The project was financed partly through foreign-currency borrowing, including yen-denominated loans. The subsequent appreciation of the Japanese yen against the Malaysian ringgit increased the company's debt burden. Operational and technical problems also affected the plant.

By 1987, Nippon Steel had withdrawn from the venture and Perwaja was experiencing substantial financial difficulties.

=== Management under Eric Chia ===
In 1987, Prime Minister Mahathir Mohamad selected businessman Eric Chia to investigate the reasons for Perwaja's difficulties. Chia was formally appointed managing director in 1988. In 1989, a new company, Perwaja Steel, was established as part of a restructuring and rehabilitation programme.

The restructuring was supported by fresh government funding and commercial loans, including RM860 million from Bank Bumiputera Malaysia and RM130 million from the Employees Provident Fund (EPF). The company's board included representatives from the Ministry of Finance.

Perwaja recorded its first accounting profit in 1991, which was presented at the time as evidence that the restructuring programme was succeeding.

Chia resigned from Perwaja in 1995. The following year, the company reported a pre-tax loss of RM376.54 million, attributed to an expansion programme involving the construction of a rolling mill. Despite the loss, Perwaja subsequently obtained a further RM600 million syndicated loan approved by the EPF.

=== Financial losses and investigation ===
Following Chia's departure, the Malaysian government commissioned an investigation into Perwaja's finances. In 1996, Deputy Prime Minister and Finance Minister Anwar Ibrahim told Parliament that investigations had identified major financial losses at the company.

Academic assessments differ according to the period and accounting measure used when describing Perwaja's losses. A 2024 study in the Malaysian Journal of Economic Studies reported accumulated losses of approximately RM9.9 billion between 1982 and 1996, when the company was privatised, and stated that losses had reached approximately RM15 billion when operations ceased in 1999.

The company's financial problems became a major political controversy in Malaysia and prompted investigations into its management and financial transactions.

=== Eric Chia prosecution ===
In February 2004, Eric Chia was charged with criminal breach of trust involving RM76.4 million belonging to Perwaja Rolling Mill and Development Sdn Bhd.

The prosecution alleged that Chia had dishonestly authorised the payment of RM76.4 million to an account belonging to Frilsham Enterprise Incorporated at American Express Bank in Hong Kong in connection with purported technical assistance from Japan's NKK Corporation.

An alternative charge alleged that Chia had disposed of the company's funds by entering into an agreement with NKK and authorising the payment without approval from Perwaja Rolling Mill and Development's board of directors or tender committee.

The prosecution called 29 witnesses during the trial.

On 26 June 2007, the Sessions Court acquitted Chia without calling for his defense. Judge Akhtar Tahir ruled that the prosecution had failed to establish a prima facie case. The court also acquitted him on the alternative charge.

=== Privatisation and restructuring ===
The government subsequently sought to restructure and privatize Perwaja.

The company's operations were eventually incorporated into Perwaja Steel Sdn Bhd under Perwaja Holdings Berhad. Perwaja Holdings was listed on the Main Market of Bursa Malaysia in August 2008 at an initial public offering price of RM2.90 per share.

The company operated plants at Kemaman, Terengganu, and Gurun, Kedah, producing direct-reduced iron, billets, blooms and other steel products.

=== Closure and financial difficulties ===
Perwaja continued to experience periods of financial difficulty following its restructuring.

In February 2002, the company temporarily closed its plants at Teluk Kalong in Kemaman and Gurun as management attempted to restructure operations during a severe downturn in its business.

Perwaja's later publicly listed corporate group again encountered serious financial difficulties during the 2010s. Steelmaking operations ceased and employees were affected by unpaid salaries and retrenchment.

Perwaja Holdings was classified under Bursa Malaysia's Practice Note 17 (PN17), which applies to listed companies experiencing serious financial distress, and was subsequently delisted from Bursa Malaysia in May 2017.

By 2017, the Perwaja group reportedly had approximately RM2 billion in outstanding debts, including amounts owed to utility suppliers Tenaga Nasional and Petronas, the Malaysian government, banks and other creditors.

=== Former employees ===
Following the cessation of operations, former Perwaja employees pursued claims relating to unpaid wages and other employment benefits.

In April 2022, 709 former employees received compensation totalling approximately RM8.65 million following legal proceedings concerning their employment claims.

=== Legacy ===
Perwaja was one of the principal projects of Malaysia's heavy-industrialisation strategy during the 1980s. Its original objective was to establish a domestic steel industry capable of supporting Malaysia's industrial development and reducing dependence on imported steel.

The company's persistent financial problems, government-supported financing and eventual losses also made it a prominent case in studies of Malaysian state-owned enterprises and industrial policy.

Academic literature has examined Perwaja in the context of the relationship between state-led industrialisation, corporate governance and political authority in Malaysia.

The Malaysian Journal of Economic Studies has described Perwaja as an example of the financial risks associated with poorly performing state-owned enterprises, reporting accumulated losses of RM9.9 billion by 1996 and approximately RM15 billion by the cessation of operations in 1999.

== See also ==
- Heavy Industries Corporation of Malaysia
- Economic history of Malaysia
- First premiership of Mahathir Mohamad
- Proton Holdings
- List of scandals in Malaysia
