= The Malaysian Insider =

Malaysian bilingual news site

- Type: Online newspaper
- Format: Online
- Owner: The Edge Media Group
- Editor: Jahabar Sadiq
- Founded: 25 February 2008
- Ceased publication: 15 March 2016
- Headquarters: Bangsar, Kuala Lumpur, Malaysia
- Website: www.themalaysianinsider.com

The Malaysian Insider (also known as TMI, The Insider, or Malay Ins Ins) was a Malaysian bilingual news site. During its peak, it ranked consistently as one of the country's 100 most popular websites. In June 2009, Alexa ranked it as Malaysia's 57th most popular website. Compete.com estimated that it had almost 19,000 unique visitors in April 2009.

On 25 February 2016, The Malaysian Insider was blocked by the country's Internet regulatory body, Malaysian Communications and Multimedia Commission (MCMC) on the grounds of national security, following continuous publication of defamatory content—an action widely perceived by pro-opposition groups as interference with free speech. After the blocking, the site's owner decided to shut it down at midnight on 15 March 2016, citing financial losses incurred by its parent company The Edge Media Group amounting to RM 10 million in the 20 months since The Malaysian Insider's acquisition.

== History ==
The Malaysian Insider was established by Png Hong Kwang and Sreedhar Subramaniam in December 2007. Png is a journalist, and Subramaniam is the former chief operating officer of the free-to-air Malaysian TV channel ntv7. A group of businessmen and journalists close to former Malaysian Prime Minister Tun Abdullah Ahmad Badawi started the news portal as a counter to Malaysiakini, which was deemed unfriendly to the Barisan Nasional (BN). When Abdullah resigned in 2009, BN stopped financing the news agency. After talking to several connections, the news portal's top management re-secured funding with help from a 30-something Penang-born businessman with close ties to the current BN leadership.

Until its closure on 15 March 2016, The Malaysian Insider was led by chief executive officer and editor Jahabar Sadiq who has worked as a journalist in the region since 1988. In June 2014, The Malaysian Insider was bought by The Edge Media Group. On 15 March 2016, the online newspaper was shut down by The Edge Media Group, citing financial losses amounting to RM 10 million in the past 20 months since The Malaysian Insider's acquisition. Other factors leading to the Insider's closure included a decision by the Malaysian Communications and Multimedia Commission to block internet access to the news website on 25 February over alleged "unverified reports" and tensions between The Edge and the Malaysian Government concerning the 1Malaysia Development Berhad scandal.

== Editorial ==
The Malaysian Insider aimed to report an "unvarnished take on events and personalities in Malaysia." The editorial generally maintained a critical stance against both Barisan Nasional and Pakatan Rakyat, although it later came to side more with the opposition parties. During the 2009 Perak constitutional crisis when BN managed to topple the Pakatan Rakyat state government, it published several hard-hitting editorial pieces calling for the dissolution of the state assembly.

== News ==
While the news site ran multiple sections from business to entertainment, political news and commentaries dominated its coverage. The organisation housed a group of reporters who produced the bulk of its leading domestic news content. To complement the in-house reporters, it also reproduced syndicated material from other established mainstream news organisations like Bernama, Reuters, and Associated Press.

== Columnists and contributors ==
The news portal maintained a large roster of columnists from diverse backgrounds. The majority of columnists however did not share the same political positions as Barisan Nasional. Several of the more notable columnists were the member of the Selangor state assemblyman and political secretary to the Selangor Menteri Besar Nik Nazmi Nik Ahmad, Democratic Action Party (DAP) Member of Parliament Liew Chin Tong, National Trust Party (Malaysia) (AMANAH) MP Khalid Abdul Samad, UMNO MP Nur Jazlan Mohamed and a former Special Officer to Prime Minister Abdullah Ahmad Badawi, Ziad Razak. Apart from the regular columnists, the news portal published letters from readers as well as blog entries.

== Publications ==
In 2009, the news portal published two books. Both compiled selected writings from its columnists.

== Controversy ==
=== Defamatory content and legal suit ===
On 12 August 2015, TMI was sued by then Menteri Besar of Selangor, Khalid Ibrahim for publishing defamatory articles claiming that he had partaken in a dubious out-of-court settlement with Bank Islam. Khalid is seeking an injunction and retraction of the articles published on 24 July, in addition to an undisclosed amount in damages. The hearing for the case was set for 2 June 2015.

On 30 January 2015, the news portal, together with Lim Guan Eng and Malaysiakini, was sued by Penang United Malays National Organisation (UMNO) secretary, Datuk Musa Sheikh Fadzir, Maison Height Sdn Bhd and Penang Barisan Nasional secretary Datuk Omar Faudzar for publishing defamatory articles on the alleged sale of Malay lands for profit. In the statement of claim, the plaintiffs referred to an article written by Lim titled "Pembohongan Umno" (Umno's Lies), which was published in The Malaysian Insider on 27 November 2014, and another article titled "Stop Spreading Lies About Penang Government, Guan Eng Tells Umno” which was also published by the same news portal on 27 November. The plaintiffs stated that Lim, Mkini, and Gan had published another article “Umno Made Profits by Selling Malay Kampungs”, containing defamatory words in Malaysiakini.

=== Accusations of bias, publishing false news and lack of credibility ===
UMNO accused the TMI of biased reporting. The party barred the news as well as several online news organisations from covering its general assembly held in Kuala Lumpur in 2009.

On 31 May 2011, the news portal published an article that contained defamatory words against former Malaysia Airlines (MAS) chairman, Tan Sri Tajuddin Ramli. Three months later, the news portal published a public apology to him. However, he did not find the apology sufficient and filled a legal suit on 18 August in Kuala Lumpur Civil Court for RM 200 million. The suit was settled out of court a month later.

On 19 October 2013, TMI issued an apology to Menteri Besar of Kedah, Dato' Seri Mukhriz bin Mahathir over its report on Mukhriz' use of money during the 2013 UMNO election.

On 4 June 2014, TMI published a news story that alleged Selangor Islamic Religious Department (Jais) "raided" a Hindu wedding ceremony, as the result of a complaint that said a Muslim woman was marrying a Hindu. A week later, Zarinah Abdul Majid, the Muslim woman, and MAIS, the head body of Jais, produced a statement that refuted The Malaysian Insider report and accused it of sensationalising the news and producing disharmony among the communities. Zarinah said that Jais had in fact done the investigation in a proper manner with respect for her, her family and her guest.

On 23 January 2015, an article regarding the appointment of University of Malaya (UM) Vice-Chancellor was made public. The article suggested the UM Vice-Chancellor for Students Affairs would have been replaced for being "weak and pro-opposition". The Vice-Chancellor, Datuk Dr Rohana Yusof, debunked the news in a Facebook post, in which she clarified that her portfolio had expired and she would not be replaced for the reasons stated in the article. On 7 March 2015, a superimposed photo of demonstrators deemed to be staged in front PAS headquarters was published. The demonstrators in the photo demanded that PAS president, Datuk Seri Abdul Hadi Awang step down. PAS Chief of Information, Datuk Mahfuz Omar demanded an apology from the news portal for publishing a fake photo. A day later, the news portal published a public apology. On 25 March 2015, the news portal published an article that alleged the Conference of Rulers did not approve the proposal by Kelantan state's government to enforce hudud in the state. The news was later swiftly denied by Kelantan Chief Secretary on Hudud, Takiyuddin Hassan. This news led Keeper of the Rulers' Seal to file a police report, resulting in the arrest of three editors by Royal Malaysia Police (PDRM) with proof from MCMC. On 12 July 2015, the news portal published an unverified report of Citizens For Accountable Governance Malaysia (CAGM) claiming that thousands of ringgit were plumed down from the Prime Minister of Malaysia's AmBank account to a Barisan Nasional bank account prior the 2013 Malaysia general election. Three days later, a blog post claimed to be by CAGM revealed that the news was fake. The group claimed that Md Zainal Abidin, the lawyer who signed the statutory declaration (SD) did not exist. Their actions were fueled by their desire to "...mak[e] a social experiment...where they become famous due to (news) editors not checking their facts right."

=== Jho Low funding ===
In 2019 it was revealed that fugitive businessman Jho Low had financed The Malaysian Insider to the tune of US9 million (over RM36 million) in 2010. He had done so in an effort to shore up support for the Najib government.

== See also ==
- Malaysiakini
- Malaysia Today
