= Malaysia Today =

Malaysian news website

Malaysia Today is a Malaysian news blog founded in August 2004.

== Founding ==
Malaysia Today was launched about two weeks before Anwar Ibrahim's release from prison on 2 September 2004. Once Deputy Prime Minister Anwar fell from grace after his action during the 1997 Asian financial crisis and was sacked by then Prime Minister Mahathir Mohamad. Raja Petra Kamaruddin, the webmaster of the Free Anwar Campaign website, decided to create Malaysia Today as part of a "Free Malaysia" campaign shortly before Anwar's release. Raja Petra took credit for predicting that Anwar would be released several weeks before it occurred.

== Censorship by the Malaysian Communications and Multimedia Commission ==
On 27 August 2008, the Malaysian government blocked the Malaysia Today website, allegedly in response to unspecified reader comments related to a 16 January 2008 article. The censorship was lifted on 12 September 2008, but Raja Petra Kamaruddin was arrested under the ISA (Internal Security Act) on the same day. He was freed on November 7, 2008, after Shah Alam city High Court Justice Syed Ahmad Helmy Syed Ahmad granted his habeas corpus petition, ruling that his 12 September detention was illegal.

After he was freed, Raja Petra went into exile. The editorial stance of the Malaysia Today blog shifted from an anti-Barisan Nasional stance to one that actively defended the ruling regime while attacking the opposition. This change led to a sharp decline in credibility and readership, with many questioning the reasons behind his U-turn. The website has largely fallen silent since Raja Petra's death in September 2004 and has not been updated in nearly a year.

== See also ==
- Malaysiakini
- The Malaysian Insider
- Khairy Chronicles – Khairy Jamaluddin: Rasputin Or Boy-Genius?
