= Abdul Razak Baginda =

Malaysian political analyst (born 1960)

Personal details
- Born: Abdul Razak bin Abdullah Malim Baginda; 6 February 1960 (age 66) Kuala Lumpur, Malaysia
- Spouse: Mazlinda Makhzan (m. 1986)
- Children: Rowena Abdul Razak
- Parent(s): Abdul Malim Baginda; Rohana Abdullah
- Education: University of Oxford
- Occupation: Director of Islamic Peace Foundation, UK
- Religion: Islam

Abdul Razak Abdullah Malim Baginda (born 6 February 1960) is a Malaysian former political analyst, and close associate of former Malaysian Prime Minister Najib Razak. He came to public notice in 2006 when he was charged with abetting the murder of Shaariibuugiin Altantuyaa, his girlfriend from Mongolia. He was acquitted on October 31, 2008, when the Malaysian High Court judge found no prima facie case against him. He continued writing while in prison, where he was remanded in custody. He has since published a book on foreign affairs that was started during his incarceration.

== Early life and career ==
Baginda is the son of the National Welfare and Social Development Council chairman Dr Abdullah Malim Baginda and Rohana Abdullah. He graduated with a bachelor's degree in politics and government from City Polytechnic, London in 1982. He continued to study and gained a master's degree in War Studies at King's College London in 1984. He subsequently began a D. Phil in International Relations at Trinity College, Oxford, which he successfully completed.

In 1988, Baginda joined the Malaysian Armed Forces Defense College as a lecturer and eventually as the head of strategic studies. In 1993, he formed a think tank called the Malaysian Strategic Research Centre, which is based in Kuala Lumpur. It is responsible for the publication of many books on topics that include international relations. They regularly organise seminars on myriad local and international issues. He is also known to be an adviser to Najib Razak.

== Shaariibuugiin Altantuyaa Murder Trial ==
The French courts are investigating allegations of corruption in the purchase of two Scorpène-class submarines and one Agosta-class submarine from French naval dockyards unit, Direction des Constructions Navales International (DCNI), by the Malaysian Ministry of Defense in 2002. The $2 billion deal was brokered by Baginda who was at that time a defense analyst at the Malaysian Strategic Research Centre think-tank. The investigation is looking into bribes of $200 million involving companies belonging to Baginda and his family members, namely Perimekar, KS Ombak Laut Sdn Bhd and Terasasi (Hong Kong) Sdn Bhd. Shaariibuugiin Altantuyaa, a Mongolian woman allegedly hired as a French translator to facilitate the purchase of the submarines and mistress to Baginda, was found murdered after she demanded a $500,000 commission on the deal. Baginda was acquitted of the charge of conspiracy of the murder of Altantuyaa by the Malaysian courts, and the father of Altantuyaa filed a RM100 million civil suit against Baginda, the two policemen accused of her murder and the Malaysian government.

On 1 August 2017, according to a French judicial source, he was charged in France on July 18 with “active and passive complicity in corruption” and “misappropriation of corporate assets”. Four others including two former DCNI chairmen, Philippe Japiot and Dominique Castellan, and two former heads of Thales International Asia (Thint Asia), Bernard Baiocco and Jean-Paul Perrier were also charged.

On August 23, 2018, the Shah Alam High Court allowed the government's application to strike out the suit filed by the family of Altantuyaa against the two police officers, the Malaysian government and Baginda. The Court of Appeals overturned that decision on March 14, 2018. On September 6, 2018, the federal government agreed to hear the government's leave to appeal against the Court of Appeal's decision to reinstate the lawsuit.

== Personal life ==
He is married to Mazlinda, a lawyer from Lincoln's Inn and former magistrate and they have one daughter, Rowena Abdul Razak Baginda born in 1987.

After his acquittal in the murder trial of Altantuyaa, Abdul Razak headed to the United Kingdom to receive a degree at University of Oxford.

== Publications ==
Books written and edited by Abdul Razak Baginda:

1. Alliance of the proxies : USSR–Vietnam relations and the implications / by Abdul Razak A. Baginda and Rohana Mahmood – 1988
2. Gorbachev And The Asia Pacific Region – August 1990
3. Malaysia's defence & foreign policies / foreword by Mohd. Najib Tun Razak; edited by Abdul Razak Abdullah Baginda, Rohana Mahmood – 1995
4. Asia in the 21st century : emerging thoughts & philosophy of an Asian century / edited by Abdul Razak Abdullah Baginda – 1996
5. Asia-Pacific's Security Dilemma: Multilateral Relations Amidst Political, Social and Economic Changes – Dec 1998
6. Civic education for civil society / edited by Murray Print, James Ellickson-Brown, Abdul Razak Baginda
7. Malaysia In Transition: Politics And Society – Dec 2002
8. Sustainable development and the fight against terrorism / edited by Abdul Razak Baginda, Peter Schier – 2002
9. Malaysia and the Islamic World – Nov 30, 2004
10. Terrorism And Sustainable Development – Sept 30, 2005
11. Is Malaysia an Islamic state? : secularism and theocracy : a study of the Malaysian constitution / edited by Abdul Razak Baginda and Peter Schier
12. Youth leadership : the challenge of globalisation / edited by Abdul Razak Baginda by Youth Leadership : the Challenge of Globalisation – 2005
13. Malaysia and East Asia / edited by Abdul Razak Baginda – 2007
14. Malaysia's foreign policy : continuity & change / edited by Abdul Razak Baginda – 2009
15. Malaysia's defence & security since 1957 – December 17, 2009
16. Malaysia at 50 & Beyond – Dec 21, 2009
17. Governing Malaysia – Dec 23, 2009
