= List of large sailing yachts =

This article lists active sailing yachts of 110 feet (34 m) and upwards in length. This list features vessels with sails which were classed as yachts when they were launched as well as any vessels which were subsequently converted to operate with sails and re-classed as yachts.

== Comparison of largest yachts ==
Yacht name	LOA	LWL	Beam	Draft	Gross tonnage	Displacement	Sail area
A	142.81 m (469 ft)	118.63 m (389 ft)	24.80 m (81 ft)	8 m (26 ft)	12,558 gt		3,747m²
Koru	127.00 m (417 ft)		16.00 m (52 ft)		3,300 gt		
Sea Cloud	109.52 m (359 ft)	77.20 m (253 ft)	14.94 m (49 ft)	5.8 m (19 ft)	2,532 grt	3,077 t	3,000m²
Black Pearl	106.70 m (350 ft)		15.00 m (49 ft)	6.8 m (22 ft)	2,986		2,877m²
Eos	92.93 m (305 ft)	71.00 m (233 ft)	13.50 m (44 ft)	5.5 m (18 ft)	1,500		3,600m²
Athena	90.00 m (295 ft)	60.50 m (198 ft)	12.20 m (40 ft)	5.7 m (19 ft)	1,103 gt	1,126 t	2,623m²
Maltese Falcon	88.10 m (289 ft)	78.30 m (257 ft)	12.40 m (41 ft)	6.1 m (20 ft)	1,157 gt	1,240 t	2,400m²
Aquijo	85.90 m (282 ft)	81.46 m (267 ft)	14.48 m (48 ft)	5.23 m (17 ft)	1,538 gt		3,995m²
Mirabella V	77.60 m (255 ft)	61.00 m (200 ft)	16.6 m (54 ft)	10.2 m (33 ft)	1,004 gt	765 t	3,380m²
Artexplorer (largest multihull)	46.50 m (153 ft)		17.10 m (56 ft)	3.40 m (11 ft)	498 gt		1,215m²
Banque Populaire V (largest trimaran)	40.00 m (131 ft)		23.00 m (75 ft)	5.8 m (19 ft)		25 t	720m²

== Full list ==
Yacht	LOA	Shipyard	Designer	Year	Notes
A	142.81 m (469 ft)	(Germany) German Naval Yards Kiel	Nobiskrug, Dykstra Naval Architects	2015	3-mast freestanding rig steel schooner
BAP Unión	115.75 m (380 ft)	(Peru) Peruvian Navy	Carlos Tejada Mera	2015	
Koru	127.00 m (417 ft)	(Netherlands) Zwijnenburg, Oceanco	Dykstra Naval Architects, Lateral Naval Architects	2022	3-mast steel schooner with aluminium flybridge
Sea Cloud	109.52 m (359 ft)	(Germany) Krupp Germaniawerft	Cox & Stevens	1931	4-mast steel barque, launched as Hussar V, currently serving as a cruiseship
Black Pearl	106.70 m (350 ft)	(Netherlands) Zwijnenburg, VDSM, Oceanco	Dykstra Naval Architects, BMT Nigel Gee	2016	3-mast DynaRig steel schooner with aluminium flybridge
Statsraad Lehmkuhl	98 m (322 ft)	(Norway) Bergen School Ship Foundation	Andreas Sohmen-Pao	1914	
Eos	92.90 m (305 ft)	(Germany) Lürssen	Bill Langan	2006	3-mast aluminium schooner with flybridge
Athena	90.00 m (295 ft)	(Netherlands) Royal Huisman	Dykstra Naval Architects	2004	3-mast gaff aluminium schooner with flybridge
The Maltese Falcon	88.10 m (289 ft)	(Turkey) (Italy) Perini Navi	Perini Navi, Dykstra Naval Architects	1990	3-mast DynaRig steel hull and aluminium flybridge, fitted out and rigged in 2006
Aquijo	85.90 m (282 ft)	(Netherlands) Vitters Shipyard, Oceanco	William Henry Tripp III, Vitters	2015	2-mast (ketch rig) steel hull with aluminium flybridge
Sea Eagle II	81.00 m (266 ft)	(Netherlands) Royal Huisman	Dykstra Naval Architects	2020	3-mast aluminium schooner with flybridge
Mirabella V	77.60 m (255 ft)	(England) Vosper Thornycroft	Ron Holland	2004	1-mast (sloop rig) aramid foam core/vinylester sandwich flybridge, and the largest single-masted yacht; refitted at Pendennis in 2014
Badis	70.00 m (230 ft)	(Turkey) (Italy) Perini Navi	Philippe Briand	2016	2-mast (ketch rig) aluminium flybridge, originally Sybaris
Atlantic	69.24 m (227 ft)	(Netherlands) Van der Graaf	William Gardner	2010	3-mast gaff replica of the steel racing schooner Atlantic (1903)
Vertigo	67.20 m (220 ft)	(New Zealand) Alloy Yachts	Philippe Briand	2011	2-mast (ketch rig) flybridge aluminium
Hetairos III	66.70 m (219 ft)	(Finland) Baltic Yachts	Dykstra Naval Architects, Reichel/Pugh	2011	2-mast (ketch rig) aramid foam core/prepreg carbonfiber
Anatta	66.00 m (217 ft)	(Netherlands) Gouwerok (hull), Vitters (fitout)	Ed Dubois	2011	1-mast (sloop rig) aluminium hull, originally Aglaia
Creole	65.30 m (214 ft)	(England) Camper & Nicholsons	Charles Ernest Nicholson	1927	3-mast staysail wooden schooner; originally Vira. Largest Wooden hulled sailing yacht.
Lamima	65.20 m (214 ft)	(Thailand) Italthai Industrial Group	Marcelo Penna	2014	2-mast auxiliary gaff wooden pinisi, hull built in Indonesia
Aquarius II	65.00 m (213 ft)	(Netherlands) Royal Huisman	Dykstra Naval Architects	2024	2-mast (ketch rig) aluminium
Adix	64.85 m (213 ft)	(Spain) Astilleros de Mallorca	Arthur Holgate, Dykstra Naval Architects	1984	3-mast topsail steel schooner Jessica, modernised at Pendennis in 1991
Pilar Rossi	64.35 m (211 ft)	(Brazil) Estaleiro Inace	Mauricio Piquet	2005	2-mast schooner trimaran converted from a 1989 Alukraft Gemi Endustrisi steel power monohull, scrapped mid 2020
Spirit of the C's	64.00 m (210 ft)	(Turkey) (Italy) Perini Navi	Ron Holland	2003	2-mast (ketch rig) aluminium hull and flybridge, originally Felicità West II
Running on Waves	64.00 m (210 ft)	(Poland) Jaroslaw Filipiak	Zygmunt Choreń	2011	3-mast auxiliary staysail steel barquentine
Mikhail S. Vorontsov	63.50 m (208 ft)	(Turkey) Dreamship Victory (hull) (Netherlands) Scheepswerf Balk Urk (fitout)	Dreamship Victory, Dykstra Naval Architects	2013	3-mast staysail wooden gulet
Athos	63.25 m (208 ft)	(Netherlands) Scheepswerf Made (hull) (Netherlands) Holland Jachtbouw (fitout)	André Hoek	2010	2-mast schooner aluminium hull, refitted in 2022
Baboon	62.00 m (203 ft)	(Sweden) FEAB Marstrandsverken	Lars Johansson	1990	3-mast steel barquentine
Rainbow Warrior III	61.34 m (201 ft)	(Germany) Fassmer	Dykstra Naval Architects	2011	2-mast expedition A-frame staysail auxiliary steel schooner
Zinat al Bihaar	61.00 m (200 ft)	Oman Royal Yacht Squadron	E. C. B. Corlett	1988	3-mast wooden dhow
Sarissa II	59.70 m (196 ft)	(Netherlands) Royal Huisman	Malcolm McKeon	2023	1-mast (sloop rig) aluminium
Germania Nova	59.60 m (196 ft)	(Spain) Factoria Naval de Marín	Max Oertz	2011	Replica of the gaff steel racing schooner Germania (1908)
Eendracht	59.08 m (194 ft)	(Netherlands) Scheepswerf Damen	Willem de Vries Lentsch, Jr.	1989	3-mast gaff steel schooner
Maximus	59.00 m (194 ft)	(Netherlands) Vitters	Germán Frers	2023	Aluminium ketch
Seahawk	58.60 m (192 ft)	(Turkey) (Italy) Perini Navi	Ron Holland	2013	Flybridge aluminium ketch
Perseus 3	58.60 m (192 ft)	(Turkey) (Italy) Perini Navi	Ron Holland	2014	1-mast (sloop rig) flybridge aluminium, sistership of Seahawk
Seven	58.60 m (192 ft)	(Turkey) (Italy) Perini Navi	Ron Holland	2017	Sistership of the flybridge aluminium ketch Seahawk
Katana	58.60 m (192 ft)	(Turkey) (Italy) Perini Navi	Ron Holland	2024	Sistership of the flybridge aluminium ketch Seahawk
Kokomo III	58.40 m (192 ft)	(New Zealand) Alloy Yachts	Ed Dubois	2010	1-mast (sloop rig) flybridge aluminium
Ngoni V	58.14 m (191 ft)	(Netherlands) Royal Huisman	Ed Dubois	2017	1-mast (sloop rig) aluminium
Ethereal	58.04 m (190 ft)	(Netherlands) Royal Huisman	Ron Holland	2009	Aluminium ketch
Taouey	58.00 m (190 ft)	(Turkey) (Italy) Perini Navi		1994	Flybridge steel ketch
Twizzle II	57.49 m (189 ft)	(Netherlands) Royal Huisman	Ed Dubois	2010	Flybridge aluminium ketch
Fleurtje	57.00 m (187 ft)	(Netherlands) Gerardus de Vries Lentsch, Jr.	Robert Clark	1960	3-mast staysail steel schooner, originally Carita
Loretta	57.00 m (187 ft)	(Turkey) Aegean Yacht	Yavuz Osman Mete	2009	3-mast staysail steel gulet, originally Montigne
Salvaje	56.40 m (185 ft)	(New Zealand) Alloy Yachts	Ed Dubois	2013	Flybridge aluminium ketch, originally Mondango III
Apsara	56.10 m (184 ft)	(Netherlands) Royal Huisman	Dykstra Naval Architects	2017	Aluminium ketch, formerly Aquarius
Burrasca	56.00 m (184 ft)	(Turkey) (Italy) Perini Navi	Ron Holland	2003	Flybridge aluminium ketch
Zenji	56.00 m (184 ft)	(Turkey) (Italy) Perini Navi	Ron Holland	2004	Sistership of the flybridge aluminium ketch Burrasca, originally Santa Maria
Rosehearty	56.00 m (184 ft)	(Turkey) (Italy) Perini Navi	Ron Holland	2006	Sistership of the flybridge aluminium ketch Burrasca
Caoz 14	56.00 m (184 ft)	(Turkey) (Italy) Perini Navi	Ron Holland	2007	Flybridge aluminium ketch, originally Selene, sistership of Burrasca
Piropo V	56.00 m (184 ft)	(Turkey) (Italy) Perini Navi	Ron Holland	2008	Flybridge aluminium ketch, originally Silvana, sistership of Burrasca
Asahi	56.00 m (184 ft)	(Turkey) (Italy) Perini Navi	Ron Holland	2009	Sistership of the flybridge aluminium ketch Burrasca, originally Riela
Melek	56.00 m (184 ft)	(Turkey) (Italy) Perini Navi	Ron Holland	2010	Sistership of the flybridge aluminium ketch Burrasca
Panthalassa	56.00 m (184 ft)	(Turkey) (Italy) Perini Navi	Ron Holland	2010	Sistership of the flybridge aluminium ketch Burrasca
Fidelis	56.00 m (184 ft)	(Turkey) (Italy) Perini Navi	Ron Holland	2011	Sistership of the flybridge aluminium ketch Burrasca
Regina	56.00 m (184 ft)	(Turkey) MedYat	Ayberk Apaydin	2011	Steel schooner
Alea	56.00 m (184 ft)	(Netherlands) Vitters	Germán Frers III	2022	1-mast (sloop rig) aluminium
Hazar Yıldızı	55.98 m (184 ft)	(Turkey) Aegean Yacht	Yavuz Osman Mete	2007	3-mast staysail steel gulet, originally Galileo
Adela	55.50 m (182 ft)	(England) John Goodman Fay & Co.	William Camper Storey, Dykstra Naval Architects	1903	Steel schooner, rebuilt at Pendennis in 1995 from Heartsease' wooden hull
Kamaxitha II	55.42 m (182 ft)	(Netherlands) Royal Huisman	Dykstra Naval Architects	2011	Aluminium ketch
Elena	55.00 m (180 ft)	(Spain) Factoria Naval de Marín	Nathanael Greene Herreshoff	2009	Replica of the racing gaff steel schooner Elena (1911)
Adèle	54.64 m (179 ft)	(Netherlands) Gouwerok (hull), Vitters (fitout)	André Hoek	2005	Aluminium ketch
Marie	54.64 m (179 ft)	(Netherlands) Vitters	André Hoek	2010	Sistership of the aluminium ketch Adèle
Meira	54.50 m (179 ft)	(Turkey) Neta Marine	Fuat Turan	2018	Three-mast flybridge steel gulet
Shenandoah	54.35 m (178 ft)	(United States) Townsend & Downey	Theodore E. Ferris	1902	3-mast gaff steel schooner
Tiara	54.27 m (178 ft)	(New Zealand) Alloy Yachts	Ed Dubois	2004	Flybridge aluminium sloop
Parsifal III	54.00 m (177 ft)	(Turkey) (Italy) Perini Navi	Ron Holland	2005	Flybridge aluminium ketch
Chronos	54.00 m (177 ft)	(Turkey) Ark Yacht	Klaus Roeder Carpe Diem Yacht Design	2013	Steel staysail ketch
Rhea	54.00 m (177 ft)	(Turkey) Ark Yacht	Klaus Roeder Carpe Diem Yacht Design	2017	Steel staysail ketch, sister ship of CHRONOS
Pink Gin VI	53.90 m (177 ft)	(Finland) Baltic Yachts	Judel/Vrolijk	2017	Aramid foam core/prepreg carbonfiber sandwich sloop
Nirvana	53.48 m (175 ft)	(Netherlands) Gouwerok (hull), Vitters (fitout)	Ed Dubois	2007	Flybridge aluminium ketch
El Boughaz I	53.30 m (175 ft)	(United States) Bath Iron Works	Henry John Gielow	1930	3-mast staysail steel auxiliary schooner, originally Black Douglas
Jasali II	53.00 m (174 ft)	(Turkey) (Italy) Perini Navi		1998	Flybridge staysail steel ketch, originally Independence
Atmosphere	53.00 m (174 ft)	(Turkey) (Italy) Perini Navi		2000	Sistership of the flybridge staysail steel ketch Independence
Drumbeat	53.00 m (174 ft)	(New Zealand) Alloy Yachts	Ed Dubois	2002	Flybridge aluminium ketch, originally Salperton II
Anne	52.50 m (172 ft)	(Netherlands) Gouwerok (hull), Vitters (fitout)	André Hoek	2009	Aluminium sloop, originally Erica XII
Doña Francisca	52.50 m (172 ft)	(Uruguay) JCLM Astillero Buquebus	Javier Soto Acebal	2014	Carbonfiber/epoxy schooner
Elfje	52.36 m (172 ft)	(Netherlands) Royal Huisman	André Hoek	2014	Aluminium ketch
Xasteria II	52.00 m (171 ft)	(Turkey) (Italy) Perini Navi		1995	Flybridge steel ketch
Luna	52.00 m (171 ft)	(Turkey) (Italy) Perini Navi		1997	Flybridge steel ketch, originally Liberty
Squall	52.00 m (171 ft)	(Turkey) (Italy) Perini Navi	Ed Dubois	2002	Aluminium ketch
Tamsen	52.00 m (171 ft)	(Turkey) (Italy) Perini Navi		2007	Flybridge steel ketch
Nazenin V	52.00 m (171 ft)	(Turkey) RMK Marine	Sparkman & Stephens	2009	Flybridge aluminium ketch
Q	51.77 m (170 ft)	(New Zealand) Alloy Yachts	Ed Dubois	2008	Sistership of the flybridge aluminium ketch Kokomo II, originally Mondango II
Red Dragon II	51.77 m (170 ft)	(New Zealand) Alloy Yachts	Ed Dubois	2008	Flybridge aluminium sloop, sistership of Kokomo II
Favourite Child	51.77 m (170 ft)	(New Zealand) Alloy Yachts	Ed Dubois	2006	Flybridge aluminium sloop, Prana originally Kokomo II
Meteor	51.59 m (169 ft)	(Netherlands) Royal Huisman	Dykstra Naval Architects, Niels Helleberg	2007	Sistership of the aluminium schooner Borkumriff IV
Sedna IV	51.33 m (168 ft)	(Germany) Scheel & Jöhnk	Peter Schenzle	1990	Expedition 3-mast Indosail schooner, converted from a 1957 Abeking & Rasmussen steel trawler
Dunia Baru	51.00 m (167 ft)	(Indonesia) Konjo Boatbuilders	Michael Kasten	2014	Auxiliary wooden pinisi
Borkumriff IV	50.58 m (166 ft)	(Netherlands) Royal Huisman	Dykstra Naval Architects, Niels Helleberg	2002	Aluminium schooner
Aresteas	50.75 m (167 ft)	(Turkey) Yıldız Meşrubat	İbrahim Karataş, Fuat Turan	2017	Flybridge wooden ketch
Better Place	50.50 m (166 ft)	(Italy) Wally Ancona	William Henry Tripp III	2012	Foam core/prepreg carbonfiber flybridge sloop
Polaris	50.42 m (165 ft)	(Germany) Lürssen		1977	auxiliary steel schooner, converted from the 1954 torpedo boat hull of HMS Polaris
Blue Gold	50.00 m (164 ft)	(Italy) Benetti	Laurent Giles Naval Architects	1982	Flybridge staysail auxiliary steel ketch, originally White Gull
Phryne	50.00 m (164 ft)	(Turkey) (Italy) Perini Navi		1999	Flybridge steel staysail ketch
Ariane	50.00 m (164 ft)	(Turkey) (Italy) Perini Navi		2000	Sistership of the flybridge steel staysail ketch Phryne, originally Felicità West
Perseus	50.00 m (164 ft)	(Turkey) (Italy) Perini Navi		2001	Sistership of the flybridge steel staysail ketch Phryne
...Is A Rose	50.00 m (164 ft)	(Turkey) (Italy) Perini Navi		2003	Sistership of the flybridge steel staysail ketch Phryne
Baracuda	50.00 m (164 ft)	(Turkey) (Italy) Perini Navi	Ron Holland	2009	Flybridge aluminium ketch
Enterprise II	50.00 m (164 ft)	(Turkey) (Italy) Perini Navi	Ron Holland	2012	Sistership of the flybridge aluminium ketch Baracuda
Xarifa	49.90 m (164 ft)	(England) J. Samuel White	Joseph Manston Soper	1927	Steel 3-mast schooner
Francesco Petrarca	49.90 m (164 ft)	(Italy) Benetti	Franco Anselmi Boretti	1941	3-mast staysail wooden schooner
Lady Ellen	49.90 m (164 ft)	(Sweden) Kockums Mekaniska Verkstad	Lars Johansson	1982	Steel barquentine
All About u	49.90 m (164 ft)	(Turkey) Ada Yacht Works	Jaron Ginton	2018	Auxiliary steel sloop with aluminium flybridge
All About u 2	49.90 m (164 ft)	(Turkey) Ada Yacht Works	Jaron Ginton	2019	Auxiliary steel sloop with aluminium flybridge, sistership of All About u
Zefira	49.70 m (163 ft)	(New Zealand) Fitzroy Yachts	Ed Dubois	2010	Aluminium sloop
Ohana II	49.70 m (163 ft)	(New Zealand) Fitzroy Yachts	Ed Dubois	2012	Flybridge aluminium sloop
Meraki	49.70 m (163 ft)	(Netherlands) Vitters	André Hoek	2020	Aluminium ketch
Eleonora	49.50 m (162 ft)	(Netherlands) Van der Graaf	Nathanael Greene Herreshoff	2002	Replica of the racing gaff steel schooner Westward (1910)
Invader	49.30 m (162 ft)	(United States) George Lawley & Son	Albert Stanton Chesebrough	1905	Gaff steel schooner
Zodiac	48.80 m (160 ft)	(United States) Hodgdon Yachts	William H. Hand, Jr.	1924	Ocean racing gaff wooden schooner
Georgia	48.46 m (159 ft)	(New Zealand) Alloy Yachts	Paolo Scanu	2000	Flybridge aluminium sloop
Thalia	48.42 m (159 ft)	(Netherlands) Gouwerok (hull), Vitters (fitout)	Ron Holland	1994	Steel ketch
Nativa	48.40 m (159 ft)	(Italy) Arzanà Navi	William Henry Tripp III	2012	Aluminium sloop
Dwinger	48.20 m (158 ft)	(Netherlands) Royal Huisman	Edward A. Fontaine, Dykstra Naval Architects	2009	Expedition aluminium sloop with aerorig
Belle Brise	48.00 m (157 ft)	(Turkey) (Italy) Perini Navi		1992	Flybridge steel staysail ketch, originally Corelia
Morning Glory	48.00 m (157 ft)	(Turkey) (Italy) Perini Navi		1993	Sistership of the flybridge steel staysail ketch Corelia
Legacy	48.00 m (157 ft)	(Turkey) (Italy) Perini Navi		1995	Sistership of the flybridge steel staysail ketch Corelia
Columbia	48.00 m (157 ft)	(United States) Eastern Shipbuilding	Starling Burgess	2014	Steel replica of the Grand Banks fishing schooner Columbia (1923)
Arabella	47.70 m (156 ft)	(United States) Palmer Johnson	Frank Reynolds MacLear, Robert B. Harris	1983	Aluminium 3-mast staysail schooner
Wisp	47.65 m (156 ft)	(Netherlands) Royal Huisman	André Hoek	2014	Aluminium sloop
Deva	47.50 m (156 ft)	(Germany) Krupp Germaniawerft	Cox & Stevens	1930	Steel gaff schooner, originally Etak
MITseaAH II	47.50 m (156 ft)	(England) Pendennis Shipyard	David Pedrick	2004	Aluminium flybridge auxiliary sloop
Hyperion	47.42 m (156 ft)	(Netherlands) Royal Huisman	Germán Frers	1998	Aluminium sloop
Gweilo	47.40 m (156 ft)	(Turkey) Mengi Yay	Dykstra Naval Architects	2009	Wood core/epoxy sandwich schooner, sistership of Windrose of Amsterdam
Asolare	47.15 m (155 ft)	(United States) Hodgdon Yachts	Bruce King	2003	Foam and wood core/epoxy sandwich ketch, originally Scheherazade
Andromeda La Dea II	47.00 m (154 ft)	(Turkey) (Italy) Perini Navi		1990	Staysail flybridge ketch
Carpe Diem IV	47.00 m (154 ft)	(Turkey) Carpe Diem Yachts		2010	Wooden gulet
Wolfhound	47.00 m (154 ft)	(Netherlands) Van der Graaf	John G. Alden	2021	3-mast gaff steel schooner
E-volution	47.00 m (154 ft)	(Turkey) (Italy) Perini Navi		2021	Flybridge aluminium sloop
Mikado	46.94 m (154 ft)	(Japan) Hitachi Zosen	William Garden	1986	Aluminium flybridge ketch
Zenith	46.90 m (154 ft)	(Turkey) Ada Yacht Works	Dykstra Naval Architects	2013	Steel schooner, sistership of Windrose of Amsterdam
Roxane	46.80 m (154 ft)	(Turkey) Su Marine Yachts	Tanju Kalaycıoğlu	2010	Wooden gulet
Nilaya II	46.80 m (154 ft)	(Netherlands) Royal Huisman	Reichel/Pugh	2023	Aluminium sloop
Windrose of Amsterdam	46.32 m (152 ft)	(Netherlands) Freddie Bloemsma, Holland Jachtbouw	Dykstra Naval Architects	2001	Aluminium schooner
Lulworth	46.30 m (152 ft)	(England) White Brothers	Herbert William White	1920	Wooden gaff cutter, originally Terpsichore
Scorpione of London	46.22 m (152 ft)	(Finland) Baltic Yachts	Judel/Vrolijk	2006	Aramid foam core/prepreg carbonfiber sandwich sloop, originally Pink Gin V
Wellenreiter	46.10 m (151 ft)	(Netherlands) Jongert	André Hoek	2003	Steel sloop
Skade	46.10 m (151 ft)	(Netherlands) Freddie Bloemsma, Holland Jachtbouw	William Henry Tripp III	2016	Aluminium sloop
The Aquarius	46.00 m (151 ft)	(Italy) Cbi Navi (hull), Perini Navi (fitout)		1990	Flybridge steel staysail ketch, originally Xasteria
Antara	46.00 m (151 ft)	(Turkey) (Italy) Perini Navi		1991	Sistership of the flybridge steel staysail ketch Xasteria, originally Liberty
Tamarita	46.00 m (151 ft)	(Turkey) (Italy) Perini Navi		1991	Sistership of the flybridge steel staysail ketch Xasteria
Infinity	46.00 m (151 ft)	(Turkey) Cobra Yacht		2010	Wooden gulet
Christopher	46.00 m (151 ft)	(England) Pendennis Shipyard	Ron Holland	2011	Aluminium ketch
Bluenose II	46.00 m (151 ft)	(Canada) Smith and Rhuland	William James Roué	1963	Replica of the wooden Grand Banks fishing schooner Bluenose (1922), entirely rebuilt at the Covey Island, Snyder's, Lunenburg shipyards in 2012
Ganesha II	46.00 m (151 ft)	(Netherlands) Gouwerok (hull), Vitters (fitout)	Ed Dubois	2013	Aluminium sloop
Zanziba	46.00 m (151 ft)	(Turkey) Etemoglu Tersanesi	Paul Spooner, Dykstra Naval Architects	2015	Wooden gulet
Unfurled IV	46.00 m (151 ft)	(Netherlands) Vitters	Germán Frers	2015	Aluminium sloop
Sir Winston Churchill	45.81 m (150 ft)	(England) Richard Dunston	Camper & Nicholsons	1966	3-mast topsail steel schooner, originally a training ship
60 Years	45.72 m (150 ft)	(Turkey) Royal Craft	Alparslan Tekoğul	2012	Steel gulet
Malcolm Miller	45.68 m (150 ft)	(Scotland) John Lewis & Sons	Camper & Nicholsons	1968	3-mast steel schooner, sistership of Sir Winston Churchill, originally a training ship
Heritage II	45.30 m (149 ft)	(Turkey) (Italy) Perini Navi	Ron Holland	2006	Steel sloop
Blush	45.30 m (149 ft)	(Turkey) (Italy) Perini Navi	Ron Holland	2007	Flybridge steel sloop, originally Helios II, sistership of Heritage II
Fivea	45.30 m (149 ft)	(Turkey) (Italy) Perini Navi	Ron Holland	2010	Sistership of the flybridge steel sloop Heritage II
Clan VIII	45.30 m (149 ft)	(Turkey) (Italy) Perini Navi	Ron Holland	2011	Sistership of the flybridge steel sloop Heritage II
Saudade IX	45.19 m (148 ft)	(Italy) Wally Fano	William Henry Tripp III	2008	Aramid foam core/prepreg carbonfiber sandwich sloop
Windy	45.00 m (148 ft)	(United States) Detyens Shipyard	Robert Marthai	1995	Steel four-masted schooner
Aiglon	45.00 m (148 ft)	(Germany) Abeking & Rasmussen	André Mauric	1970	Auxiliary schooner
Annabella	45.00 m (148 ft)	(Turkey) Ağanlar	İbrahim Karataş	2008	Wood/epoxy gulet
Palmira	45.00 m (148 ft)	(New Zealand) Fitzroy Yachts	Ed Dubois	2009	Aluminium sloop, originally Salperton IV
Mirasol	45.00 m (148 ft)	(Netherlands) Freddie Bloemsma, Holland Jachtbouw	William Dixon	2014	Aluminium sloop, originally Heureka
Halcon Del Mar	45.00 m (148 ft)	(Turkey) Tum Tour Yacht		2017	Classic wooden gulet ketch
Visione	44.84 m (147 ft)	(Finland) Baltic Yachts	Reichel/Pugh	2002	Aramid foam core/prepreg carbonfiber sandwich sloop
Aegean	44.80 m (147 ft)	(Turkey) Cobra Yacht	Dykstra Naval Architects	2007	Wooden gulet
Catalina	44.75 m (147 ft)	(Netherlands) Vitters	Ed Dubois	2001	Aluminium ketch, formerly Timoneer II
Orion	44.74 m (147 ft)	(England) Camper & Nicholsons	Charles Ernest Nicholson	1910	Gaff schooner, originally Sylvana
Mari-Cha III	44.70 m (147 ft)	(New Zealand) Marten Marine, Sensation Yachts	Philippe Briand	1997	Fiberglass oceanracing ketch
Path III	44.60 m (146 ft)	(Finland) Baltic Yachts	Judel/Vrolijk	2021	Aramid foam core/prepreg carbonfiber sandwich sloop
Magic	44.33 m (145 ft)	(Netherlands) Vitters	Reichel/Pugh	2024	Aluminium sloop
Ningaloo	44.20 m (145 ft)	(Netherlands) Gouwerok (hull), Vitters (fitout)	Ed Dubois	2010	Aluminium sloop, formerly Lady B
Hemisphere	44.20 m (145 ft)	(United States) Derecktor Bridgeport (hull) (England) Pendennis Shipyard (fitout)	VPLP, BMT Nigel Gee	2011	Aluminium flybridge catamaran
Kauris IV	44.20 m (145 ft)	(Italy) Persico Marine	Germán Frers	2020	Carbonfiber sloop
Imagine D	44.18 m (145 ft)	(New Zealand) Alloy Yachts	Ed Dubois	2010	Aluminium sloop
Adornate	44.00 m (144 ft)	(Netherlands) De Industrie		1961	Steel trawler converted to a staysail schooner in 1997, originally Arie Jacob
Mes Amis	44.00 m (144 ft)	(New Zealand) Fitzroy Yachts	Ed Dubois	2007	Aluminium sloop, originally Salperton III
Lethantia	43.95 m (144 ft)	(Netherlands) Royal Huisman	Henk Lunstroo	1994	Aluminium schooner, originally Borkumriff III
Encore	43.90 m (144 ft)	(New Zealand) Alloy Yachts	Ed Dubois	2013	Aluminium sloop
Esense	43.70 m (143 ft)	(Italy) Wally Fano	William Henry Tripp III	2006	Carbonfiber sloop
Syl	43.66 m (143 ft)	(Spain) Schwartz Hautmont, Barcos Deportivos	Germán Frers	2003	Aluminium sloop
Sylvia	43.60 m (143 ft)	(England) Camper & Nicholsons	Charles Ernest Nicholson	1925	Wooden ketch
Svea	43.60 m (143 ft)	(Netherlands) Freddie Bloemsma, Vitters	Tore Holm	2017	Aluminium 1937 original J-class yacht design
Juliet	43.58 m (143 ft)	(Netherlands) Royal Huisman	Ron Holland	1993	Aluminium ketch
Mephisto	43.50 m (143 ft)	(Poland) Vace Yacht Builders	Zygmunt Choreń	2002	Auxiliary schooner
Victoria	43.40 m (142 ft)	(Turkey) (Italy) Perini Navi	Ron Holland	2004	Flybridge aluminium ketch, originally Ohana
Lionheart	43.40 m (142 ft)	(Netherlands) Freddie Bloemsma, Claasen Jachtbouw	Starling Burgess or Olin Stephens	2010	Aluminium 1937 original J-class yacht design
Blue Papillon III	43.31 m (142 ft)	(Netherlands) Royal Huisman	Germán Frers	2013	Aluminium sloop
Ravenger	43.31 m (142 ft)	(Netherlands) Royal Huisman	Germán Frers	2015	Sistership of the aluminium sloop Blue Papillon III, originally Sea Eagle
Canova II	43.30 m (142 ft)	(Finland) Baltic Yachts	Farr Yacht Design	2019	Foam core/prepreg carbonfiber sandwich sloop
Mystere	43.20 m (142 ft)	(Netherlands) Vitters	William Henry Tripp III	2006	Aluminium sloop
Zaca	43.00 m (141 ft)	(United States) Nunes Brothers	Garland Rotch	1930	Gaff schooner
Paz	43.00 m (141 ft)	(Italy) Perini Navi		1987	Flybridge ketch, originally Andromeda La Dea
Enterprise	43.00 m (141 ft)	(Turkey) (Italy) Perini Navi		1989	Flybridge ketch, originally Felicita am
Zaca a te Moana	43.00 m (141 ft)	(Netherlands) De Amstel	Olivier Foppe van Meer	1992	Gaff schooner
Cavallo	42.93 m (141 ft)	(Finland) Baltic Yachts	Judel/Vrolijk	2003	balsa foam core/prepreg carbonfiber sandwich sloop, originally Canica II
Espiritu del Xarey	42.90 m (141 ft)	(Netherlands) Vitters	Ed Dubois	2002	Aluminium sloop, originally Whirlaway
Koo	42.90 m (141 ft)	(Netherlands) Gouwerok (hull), Vitters (fitout)	Ed Dubois	2002	Sistership of the aluminium sloop Whirlaway, originally African Queen
Guillemot	42.90 m (141 ft)	(Netherlands) Vitters	Ed Dubois	2004	Sistership of the aluminium sloop Whirlaway, originally Gimlä
Asgard	42.84 m (141 ft)	(Germany) Abeking & Rasmussen	Bruce King	1993	Wooden ketch, originally Hetairos II
Delusha	42.67 m (140 ft)	(Netherlands) Gouwerok (hull), Vitters (fitout)	André Hoek	1999	Aluminium sloop, originally Aphrodite 2
Samurai	42.67 m (140 ft)	(France) JMV Industries	Philippe Briand, Clay Oliver, Greg Elliott	2003	Carbonfiber oceanracing schooner, originally Mari-Cha IV, converted for cruising at Royal Huisman in 2015
Persévérance	42.64 m (140 ft)	(Vietnam) Chantiers Piriou	VPLP, Olivier Petit	2022	Aluminium expedition schooner
Topaz	42.62 m (140 ft)	(Netherlands) Freddie Bloemsma, Holland Jachtbouw	Frank Cabot Paine	2015	Aluminium 1935 original J-class yacht design
Skorpios II	42.62 m (140 ft)	(Finland) Nautor's Swan	Juan Kouyoumdjian	2021	Aramid foam core/prepreg unidirectional carbonfiber oceanracing sloop
Sharlou	42.60 m (140 ft)	(England) Green Marine (hull) (Netherlands) Vitters (fitout)	William Henry Tripp III	2011	Prepreg carbonfiber sloop, originally Sarissa
Christianne B	42.50 m (139 ft)	(Italy) Ortona Navi (hull), Perini Navi (fitout)		1986	Flybridge ketch
L'Aquila II	42.50 m (139 ft)	(Turkey) Mengi Yay	Jaron Ginton	2021	Auxiliary steel sloop with aluminium flybridge
Rebecca	42.42 m (139 ft)	(England) Pendennis Shipyard	Germán Frers	1999	Aluminium ketch
America	42.37 m (139 ft)	(United States) Scarano Boat Building	George Steers	1995	enlarged replica of the racing gaff schooner America (1851)
Cyclos III	42.36 m (139 ft)	(Netherlands) Royal Huisman	Ron Holland	1990	Aluminium ketch
Yamakay	42.36 m (139 ft)	(France) CMN	Richard Eliot Carter	1994	Foam core/fiberglass sandwich replica of the 3-mast staysail schooner Vendredi 13, originally Friday Star
E-volution GTS	42.30 m (139 ft)	(Turkey) (Italy) Perini Navi	Reichel/Pugh	2019	Sistership of the "E-volution" aluminium sloop
Vijonara V	42.25 m (139 ft)	(Netherlands) Freddie Bloemsma (hull) (England) Pendennis Shipyard (fitout)	André Hoek	2018	Sistership of the aluminium sloop Atalante II
Douce France	42.20 m (138 ft)	(France) Alumarine	VPLP	1998	Aluminium flybridge catamaran schooner
Hanuman	42.20 m (138 ft)	(Netherlands) Royal Huisman	Charles Ernest Nicholson	2009	Aluminium replica of the J-class yacht Endeavour II (1936)
Perla del Mare	42.20 m (138 ft)	(Turkey) Saba Yacht		2010	Wooden gulet
E-volution	42.20 m (138 ft)	(Turkey) (Italy) Perini Navi	Reichel/Pugh	2019	Aluminium sloop
Mariette	42.05 m (138 ft)	(United States) Herreshoff Manufacturing Company	Nathanael Greene Herreshoff	1916	Steel gaff schooner
Croce del Sud	42.00 m (138 ft)	(Italy) Cantiere Martinolich	Nicolò Martinolich	1931	Steel 3-mast schooner
Sir Robert Baden Powell	42.00 m (138 ft)	(Germany) Schiffswerft „Edgar André“	Cees Kapteyn, Klaus Stromenger	1957	Steel topsail schooner
Passe-Partout III	42.00 m (138 ft)	(Netherlands) Jongert	Tony Castro	2001	Steel flybridge ketch
Seabiscuit	41.83 m (137 ft)	(Netherlands) Holland Jachtbouw	André Hoek	2005	Aluminium schooner, originally Skylge
Southwind	41.61 m (137 ft)	(Netherlands) Jongert	Tony Castro	1999	Steel ketch, originally St. Jean
Anna Christina	41.61 m (137 ft)	(Netherlands) Jongert	Tony Castro	2000	Sistership of the steel ketch St. Jean
Abide	41.61 m (137 ft)	(Netherlands) Jongert	Tony Castro	2002	Sistership of the steel ketch St. Jean, originally Islandia
Infatuation	41.61 m (137 ft)	(Netherlands) Jongert	Tony Castro	2004	Sistership of the steel ketch St. Jean
Queen Nefertiti	41.58 m (136 ft)	(Spain) Astilleros Celaya	Sparkman & Stephens	1986	Steel schooner
Ranger	41.55 m (136 ft)	(Denmark) Royal Denship	Starling Burgess or Olin Stephens	2003	Replica of steel J-class yacht Ranger (1937)
Melody	41.54 m (136 ft)	(Netherlands) Acico Yachts (hull) (Estonia) Ridas Kaleininkas (fitout)	Olivier Foppe van Meer	2022	Aluminium ketch
Mirabella III	41.50 m (136 ft)	(Thailand) Concorde Yachts	Bruce Farr	1994	Fiberglass sloop
Satori	41.50 m (136 ft)	(Turkey) Big Blue Yachting	Dincer Dinc	2017	Wooden gulet
Alejandra	41.33 m (136 ft)	(Spain) Mefasa	Bruce King	1993	Aluminium ketch
Daima	41.26 m (135 ft)	(Turkey) Arkin Pruva	İbrahim Karataş	2009	Wooden gulet
Cambria	41.14 m (135 ft)	(Scotland) Fife & Son	William Fife III	1928	Wooden IYRU 23mR cutter
Riana	41.00 m (135 ft)	(Turkey) Neta Marine		2007	Wooden gulet, originally Queen of Andaman
Inmocean	41.00 m (135 ft)	(New Zealand) Fitzroy Yachts	Ed Dubois	2008	Aluminium sloop
Destination	40.90 m (134 ft)	(New Zealand) Alloy Yachts	Ed Dubois	2002	Aluminium sloop, originally Harlequin
Altair	40.80 m (134 ft)	(Scotland) Fife & Son	William Fife III	1931	Wooden gaff schooner
Valquest	40.80 m (134 ft)	(Netherlands) Bloemsma van Breemen	Ed Dubois	2009	Aluminium sloop
Surama C	40.64 m (133 ft)	(Netherlands) Royal Huisman	Ted Hood, Edward A. Fontaine	1997	Sistership of the aluminium ketch Anakena
Allure	40.50 m (133 ft)	(South Africa) Sterling Yachts	Angelo Lavranos	1994	Aluminium sloop, originally Corsta V
Cosmoledo	40.47 m (133 ft)	(France) Alumarine	Jérôme Renous	2013	Expedition auxiliary aluminium ketch
Marlin Delrey V	40.45 m (133 ft)	(Germany) Lürssen	Ron Holland	1993	Aluminium ketch, originally Twirlybird V
Kōkōtea	40.40 m (133 ft)	(New Zealand) Alloy Yachts	Ed Dubois	2000	Aluminium sloop, originally Kokomo
Zelda	40.40 m (133 ft)	(Turkey) Su Marine Yachts	Tanju Kalaycıoğlu	2009	Wooden gulet
Anakena	40.28 m (132 ft)	(Netherlands) Royal Huisman	Ted Hood, Edward A. Fontaine	1996	Aluminium ketch
Black Swan	40.20 m (132 ft)	(England) Camper & Nicholsons	Charles Ernest Nicholson	1899	Wooden ketch, originally the yawl Brynhilde
Moss	40.10 m (132 ft)	(Turkey) Vosmarine Yatçılık	Paolo Scanu	2016	Steel gulet
Latitude	40.00 m (131 ft)	(Thailand) Concorde Yachts	Bruce Farr	1991	Fiberglass sloop, originally Mirabella I
Principessa Vaivia	40.00 m (131 ft)	(Turkey) (Italy) Perini Navi		1991	Flybridge ketch, originally Marisa
Ocean Pure 2	40.00 m (131 ft)	(Thailand) Concorde Yachts	Bruce Farr	1992	Fiberglass sloop, originally Mirabella II
Ellen V	40.00 m (131 ft)	(Turkey) (Italy) Perini Navi		2001	Flybridge steel ketch, originally Thetis
Harvey Gamage	40.0 m (131 ft)	(United States) Harvey F. Gamage Shipyard	McCurdy & Rhodes, Naval Architects	1973	2-mast (gaff-rig) schooner
Spindrift 2	40.00 m (131 ft)	(France) CDK Technologies	VPLP	2008	Carbonfiber oceanracing trimaran, originally Banque Populaire V
State of Grace	40.00 m (131 ft)	(Turkey) Perini Navi	Ron Holland	2013	Aluminium sloop
Extreme	40.00 m (131 ft)	(Turkey) Mengi Yay	Jaron Ginton	2018	Auxiliary steel sloop with aluminium flybridge
Aristarchos	39.99 m (131 ft)	(Finland) Nautor's Swan	Germán Frers	2006	Fiberglass sloop
Antares II	39.98 m (131 ft)	(Netherlands) Royal Huisman	William Dixon	2005	Aluminium ketch
Black Sails	39.95 m (131 ft)	(Italy) Wally Fano	Javier Soto Acebal	2009	Carbonfiber sloop, originally Dream
Maria Cattiva	39.92 m (131 ft)	(Netherlands) Royal Huisman	Bruce King	2003	Aluminium sloop
Rainbow	39.90 m (131 ft)	(Netherlands) Freddie Bloemsma, Holland Jachtbouw	Starling Burgess	2012	Aluminium replica of J-class yacht Rainbow (1934)
Rox Star	39.90 m (131 ft)	(Turkey) Bodrum Oğuz Marin	Hakan Humalı	2015	Steel gulet
Levantin	39.86 m (131 ft)	(Turkey) Evadne Yachts	İbrahim Karataş	2009	Flybridge steel gulet
Alithia	39.80 m (131 ft)	(Germany) Abeking & Rasmussen	William Henry Tripp III	2001	Aluminium sloop
Huckleberry	39.75 m (130 ft)	(New Zealand) Alloy Yachts	Bill Langan	2001	Aluminium ketch, originally Victoria of Strathearn II
Janice of Wyoming	39.70 m (130 ft)	(New Zealand) Alloy Yachts	Ed Dubois	2005	Aluminium sloop
America	39.60 m (130 ft)	(United States) Goudy & Stevens	George Steers	1967	Replica of the gaff wooden schooner America (1851)
Le Pietre	39.60 m (130 ft)	(Turkey) Ada Yacht Works		2009	Wooden gulet
Perseverance II	39.60 m (130 ft)	(Finland) Baltic Yachts	Dykstra Naval Architects	2021	Aramid foam core/epoxy sandwich sloop
Endeavour	39.56 m (130 ft)	(England) Camper & Nicholsons	Charles Ernest Nicholson	1934	Steel J-class yacht, 1934 America's Cup challenger, restored at Royal Huisman in 1989
Velsheda	39.40 m (129 ft)	(England) Camper & Nicholsons	Charles Ernest Nicholson	1933	Steel J-class yacht, restored at Southampton Yacht Services in 1995
Grace III	39.30 m (129 ft)	(Netherlands) Freddie Bloemsma (hull) (Turkey) SES Yachts (fitout)	André Hoek	2021	Sistership of the aluminium sloop Atalante II
Halekai	39.30 m (129 ft)	(Netherlands) Freddie Bloemsma (hull) (England) Pendennis Shipyard (fitout)	André Hoek	2020	Sistership of the aluminium sloop Atalante II
Linnea Aurora	39.30 m (129 ft)	(Turkey) SES Yachts (fitout)	André Hoek	2024	Sistership of the aluminium sloop Atalante II
Naema	39.26 m (129 ft)	(Netherlands) Van der Graaf (hull) (United States) Hodgdon Yachts (fitout)	Rainer Hantke	2013	Gaff steel schooner, originally Noelani, adaptation of Panda (Alfred Mylne, 1938)
Vaimiti	39.20 m (129 ft)	(France) Tréhard	Jacques & Nicolas Fauroux	2003	Aluminium sloop
Thendara	39.14 m (128 ft)	(Scotland) Alexander Stephen and Sons	Alfred Mylne	1936	Wooden ketch
Vendredi 13	39.01 m (128 ft)	(France) Tecimar	Richard Eliot Carter	1972	3-mast staysail aluminium schooner
Vagrant II	39.00 m (128 ft)	(United States) Herreshoff Manufacturing Company	Nathanael Greene Herreshoff	1913	Steel gaff schooner, restored with a staysail rig at Royal Huisman in 2019
Doriana	39.00 m (128 ft)	(Denmark) Frederikssund Skibsværft	Ado Von Lindholm, Ernst Wedell-Wedellsborg	1930	Gaff wooden schooner
Tenaz	39.00 m (128 ft)	(England) Pendennis Shipyard	Ed Dubois	1997	Aluminium sloop, originally Mamamouchi
Dragon Fly	39.00 m (128 ft)	(Turkey) Gür Tekne	İbrahim Karataş	2006	Wooden gulet
Lotus	39.00 m (128 ft)	(Turkey) Gür Tekne	İbrahim Karataş	2006	Wooden gulet
Take It Easier	39.00 m (128 ft)	(Turkey) Arkin Pruva		2007	Wooden gulet
Cervo	39.00 m (128 ft)	(England) Green Marine (hull) (Netherlands) Vitters (fitout)	William Henry Tripp III	2009	Prepreg carbonfiber sandwich sloop, originally Cinderella IV, modernized at Pendennis in 2018
Be Cool II	38.98 m (128 ft)	(Finland) Nautor's Swan	Germán Frers	2025	Aramid foam core/prepreg carbonfiber sandwich sloop
Raijin	38.98 m (128 ft)	(Finland) Nautor's Swan	Germán Frers	2026	Aramid foam core/prepreg carbonfiber sandwich sloop
Clan VI	38.95 m (128 ft)	(Italy) Ortona Navi (hull), Perini Navi (fitout)	Richard Eliot Carter	1984	Flybridge steel ketch, originally Felicità
Lady M	38.90 m (128 ft)	(New Zealand) Fitzroy Yachts	Ed Dubois	2006	Aluminium sloop, originally Zulu II
Cyrano de Bergerac	38.90 m (128 ft)	(England) Camper & Nicholsons	Robert Humphreys	1993	Aluminium ketch
Atalante II	38.80 m (127 ft)	(Netherlands) Freddie Bloemsma, Claasen Jachtbouw	André Hoek	2015	Aluminum sloop
Penelope	38.71 m (127 ft)	(France) Chantiers et ateliers de la Perrière	Eugène Cornu	1968	Alumnium yawl
Mumu	38.71 m (127 ft)	(Turkey) RMK Marine, R.B. Dereli Yatçılık	Philippe Briand	2004	Fiberglass sloop
Dione Star	38.50 m (126 ft)	(Netherlands) Scheepswerf Friesland	Diana Yacht Design	1991	Sistership of the flybridge auxiliary steel ketch Colombaio Sun, originally Colombaio Star
Mata Mua	38.50 m (126 ft)	(Netherlands) Scheepswerf Friesland	Diana Yacht Design	1991	Sistership of the flybridge auxiliary steel ketch Colombaio Star, originally Colombaio Sun
Gloria	38.40 m (126 ft)	(Netherlands) Jongert (hull), Lowland Yachts (fitout)	Pieter C.J. Beeldsnijder	1986	Staysail steel schooner, adaptation of Panda (Alfred Mylne, 1938)
Parlay	38.40 m (126 ft)	(Italy) Ortona Navi	Niels Helleberg	1991	Flybridge aluminium ketch
Queen of Karia II	38.20 m (125 ft)	(Turkey) Arkin Pruva	İbrahim Karataş	2007	Wooden gulet
Twilight	38.14 m (125 ft)	(Turkey) RMK Marine	Ed Dubois	2013	Flybridge fiberglass sloop
Kaori	38.10 m (125 ft)	(United States) Palmer Johnson	Ernest M. Brierley & Charles W. Paine	1991	Aluminium schooner, originally Mandalay
Mariquita	38.00 m (125 ft)	(Scotland) Fife & Son	William Fife III	1911	Wooden IYRU 19mR cutter, restored at Fairlie Restorations in 2004
Aello	38.00 m (125 ft)	(Germany) Oertz & Harder	Max Oertz	1922	Gaff wooden schooner
Six Plus Two	38.00 m (125 ft)	(Netherlands) Cammenga	Willem de Vries Lentsch, Jr.	1972	Steel ketch, originally Fivea
Bolero	38.00 m (125 ft)	(Turkey) Mengi Yay		1996	Flybridge gulet
Kairos	38.00 m (125 ft)	(Turkey) Aegean Yacht	Yavuz Osman Mete	2007	Steel schooner
Yam 2	38.00 m (125 ft)	(Turkey) (Italy) Perini Navi	Philippe Briand	2009	Aluminium sloop, originally Perseus 2
Dahlak	38.00 m (125 ft)	(Turkey) (Italy) Perini Navi	Philippe Briand	2016	Sistership of the aluminium sloop Perseus 2
Cheyenne	37.90 m (124 ft)	(New Zealand) TP Cookson	Gino Morelli & Peter Melvin	1998	Aramid foam core/prepreg carbonfiber sandwich oceanracing catamaran, originally Playstation
Ultima Novia	37.80 m (124 ft)	(New Zealand) Sensation Yachts	Sparkman & Stephens	1993	Aluminium ketch, originally Sariyah
Antonisa	37.80 m (124 ft)	(United States) Hodgdon Yachts	Bruce King	1999	Wooden sloop
Freedom	37.73 m (124 ft)	(Italy) Picchiotti	Sparkman & Stephens	1986	Aluminium ketch
Hazar Yıldızı	37.50 m (123 ft)	(United States) Palmer Johnson	Sparkman & Stephens	1989	Aluminium ketch, originally Galileo
Axia	37.50 m (123 ft)	(United States) Palmer Johnson	Sparkman & Stephens	1990	Aluminium ketch, originally Maysylph
Bushido	37.50 m (123 ft)	(Turkey) Bod-Yat A.S.	Paolo Scanu	2004	Steel ketch
Escapade	37.50 m (123 ft)	(New Zealand) Fizroy Yachts	Ed Dubois	2014	Aluminium sloop
Ludynosa G	37.48 m (123 ft)	(New Zealand) Fitzroy Yachts	Ed Dubois	2004	Aluminium sloop, originally Helios
Archelon	37.45 m (123 ft)	(England) H.M.S. Daedalus (hull) (England) Pendennis Shipyard (fitout)	Robert Humphreys	2019	Fiberglass sloop
La Cattiva	37.40 m (123 ft)	(England) Pendennis Shipyard	Ed Dubois	1991	Aluminium ketch, originally Taramber
Pumula	37.33 m (122 ft)	(Netherlands) Royal Huisman	Dykstra Naval Architects	2012	Aluminium sloop
Action	37.33 m (122 ft)	(Netherlands) Royal Huisman	Dykstra Naval Architects	2014	Sistership of the aluminium sloop Pumula
Navilux	37.30 m (122 ft)	(Croatia) Porta doo	Dušan Rebernik	2011	Flybridge auxiliary steel ketch
Cassiopeia	37.25 m (122 ft)	(Italy) Vincenzo Aurilia		1946	Auxiliary wooden ketch, originally a marble carrier christened Ciro
Ghost	37.20 m (122 ft)	(England) Green Marine (hull) (Netherlands) Vitters (fitout)	Luca Brenta	2005	Prepreg carbonfiber sloop
Moonbird	37.15 m (122 ft)	(New Zealand) Fitzroy Yachts	Ed Dubois	2003	Aluminium sloop, originally Midnight
Levantin	37.06 m (122 ft)	(Turkey) Evadne Yachts	İbrahim Karataş	2009	Flybridge steel gulet
Joseph Conrad	37.00 m (121 ft)	(Netherlands) G & S		1916	Gaff steel cargo schooner, originally Saturn, converted for cruising 1978
Philkade	37.40 m (123 ft)	(New Zealand) Thackwray, Sensation Yachts	Ed Dubois	1986	Aluminium sloop, originally Aquel II
Beaugeste	37.00 m (121 ft)	(England) Brooke Marine	Ron Holland	1989	Aluminium sloop, originally Beaupré
Carlotta	37.00 m (121 ft)	(Turkey) (Italy) Perini Navi		1992	Steel ketch
Genevieve	37.00 m (121 ft)	(New Zealand) Alloy Yachts	Ed Dubois	1996	Aluminium sloop, originally Atlanta
Khaleesi	37.00 m (121 ft)	(Turkey) (Italy) Perini Navi		1997	Steel ketch, originally Salperton
Thandeka	37.00 m (121 ft)	(Netherlands) Bayards (hull) (England) Camper & Nicholsons (fitout)	Ed Dubois	1999	Aluminium sloop, originally Our Blue Dream
Radiance	37.00 m (121 ft)	(Netherlands) Bayards	Ed Dubois	2007	Sistership of the aluminium sloop Our Blue Dream, originally Damahwil
A Sulana	37.00 m (121 ft)	(Netherlands) Freddie Bloemsma, Holland Jachtbouw	William Dixon	2006	Aluminium sloop, originally YII
Vitalia II	36.80 m (121 ft)	(France) Multiplast	Gilles Ollier	2003	carbonfiber ocean racing catamaran, originally Orange II, converted for cruising in 2015
Bliss	36.80 m (121 ft)	(New Zealand) Yachting Developments	Ed Dubois	2009	Aramid foam core/epoxy carbonfiber sandwich sloop
Bristolian II	36.70 m (120 ft)	(New Zealand) Yachting Developments	Philippe Briand	2008	Aramid foam core/epoxy carbonfiber sandwich sloop
New Zealand	36.57 m (120 ft)	(New Zealand) Marten Marine	Bruce Farr	1988	Aramid foam core/carbonfiber/Kevlar sandwich inshore racing sloop, 1988 America's Cup challenger
Audrey the First	36.55 m (120 ft)	(Finland) Nautor's Swan	Germán Frers	2021	Aramid foam core/prepreg carbonfiber sandwich sloop
Puritan	36.50 m (120 ft)	(United States) Electric Boat Company	John G. Alden	1931	Gaff steel schooner
Tosca III	36.50 m (120 ft)	(Poland) Yacht Building Management	Juliusz Strawinsky	1993	Steel sloop, originally Centenarian
Jagare	36.48 m (120 ft)	(Germany) Abeking & Rasmussen	Willem de Vries Lentsch, Jr.	1981	Aluminium ketch
Shamrock V	36.42 m (119 ft)	(England) Camper & Nicholsons	Charles Ernest Nicholson	1930	Wooden J-class yacht, 1930 America's Cup challenger, refitted at Pendennis in 2001
Tamer II	36.42 m (119 ft)	(Netherlands) Jongert	Doug Peterson	1986	Steel ketch
Alexa	36.30 m (119 ft)	(Poland) Yacht Building Management	Juliusz Strawinsky	1992	Steel gaff cutter, originally White Eagle
Miss Silver	36.20 m (119 ft)	(New Zealand) Alloy Yachts	Ed Dubois	1995	Aluminium sloop, originally Sovereign
Candida	36.15 m (119 ft)	(England) Camper & Nicholsons	Charles Ernest Nicholson	1929	Wooden IYRU 23mR cutter, restored at Cantieri Navali Beconcini in 1991
Corto Maltese	36.12 m (119 ft)	(Canada) Shore Boats	William Garden	1982	Aluminium flybridge auxiliary sloop, originally launched as Ora with a ketch rig
Marline	35.97 m (118 ft)	(Netherlands) Cammenga	Willem de Vries Lentsch, Jr.	1974	Steel schooner
Sunny Hill	36.00 m (118 ft)	(Netherlands) De Amstel	Diana Yacht Design	1984	Steel flybridge auxiliary ketch, originally Colombaio Sky
Gitana	36.00 m (118 ft)	(Italy) Codecasa (hull), Perini Navi (fitout)		1988	Steel flybridge sloop
Tara	36.00 m (118 ft)	(France) SFCN Villeneuve-la-Garenne	Luc Bouvet & Olivier Petit	1988	Expedition aluminium schooner, originally Antarctica
Globana M	36.00 m (118 ft)	(Germany) Abeking & Rasmussen	Ron Holland	1994	Aluminium ketch
Yanneke Too	36.00 m (118 ft)	(England) Camper & Nicholsons	William Dixon	1996	Wood core/fiberglass sandwich ketch
Ofelia	36.00 m (118 ft)	(Turkey) Anadolu Tersanesi, Bordo Denizcilik	Turhan Soyaslan	2000	Steel gulet
Viriella	36.00 m (118 ft)	(Italy) Maxi Dolphin	Germán Frers	2001	Fiberglass sloop
Skythia	36.00 m (118 ft)	(Bulgaria) Nautica	George Steers	2005	Steel replica of the racing gaff schooner America (1851)
Dolce Mare	36.00 m (118 ft)	(Turkey) Neta Marine		2012	Wooden/epoxy gulet
Glorious	36.00 m (118 ft)	(Turkey) Esen Yacht		2012	Wood/epoxy auxiliary flybridge ketch
Queen South III	35.97 m (118 ft)	(Turkey) Cihan Marine		1997	Steel gulet, formerly QS Atlantic
White Soul	35.84 m (118 ft)	(Turkey) Bod-Yat A.S.		2007	Cold moulded wood gulet
OneLilo	35.80 m (117 ft)	(Germany) Abeking & Rasmussen	Germán Frers	1988	Aluminium sloop, originally Extra-Beat
Knickerbocker	35.75 m (117 ft)	(United States) Palmer Johnson	Sparkman & Stephens	1992	Aluminium ketch motorsailor, originally Timoneer
Fancy II	35.66 m (117 ft)	(Finland) Nautor's Swan	Germán Frers	2023	Aramid foam core/epoxy/prepreg carbonfiber sandwich sloop
Hamilton II	35.65 m (117 ft)	(France) Construction navale de Bordeaux	Philippe Briand	2005	Wood core/vinylester sandwich sloop
Tiziana	35.61 m (117 ft)	(Germany) Abeking & Rasmussen	Sparkman & Stephens	1963	Steel ketch, restored at Vitters in 2006
Doryan	35.50 m (116 ft)	(Finland) Baltic Yachts	Judel/Vrolijk	2014	Carbonfiber sloop
Whisper	35.46 m (116 ft)	(Netherlands) Engelaer, Holland Jachtbouw	Edward A. Fontaine	2003	Aluminium sloop
Gelliceaux	35.41 m (116 ft)	(South Africa) Southern Wind	Farr Yacht Design	2023	Aramid core/carbonfiber-epoxy sandwich sloop
Tenacious	35.37 m (116 ft)	(United States) Windship Trident Shipworks	Ted Hood, Edward A. Fontaine	1995	Aramid core/epoxy sandwich sloop, originally Teel
Lunar	35.30 m (116 ft)	(Poland) Conrad shipyard	Vripack, Juliusz Strawinsky	2013	Auxiliary flybridge aluminium ketch
Lir	35.22 m (116 ft)	(Italy) Ortona Navi	Willem de Vries Lentsch, Jr.	1988	Steel flybridge ketch, originally Magdalus Terzo
Firefly	35.20 m (115 ft)	(Netherlands) Freddie Bloemsma, Claasen Jachtbouw	André Hoek	2011	Aluminium sloop
Solleone	35.20 m (115 ft)	(Finland) Nautor's Swan	Germán Frers	2015	Aramid foam core/prepreg carbonfiber sandwich sloop
Shamanna	35.20 m (115 ft)	(Finland) Nautor's Swan	Germán Frers	2016	Sistership of the aramid foam core/prepreg carbonfiber sandwich sloop Solleone
Moat	35.20 m (115 ft)	(Finland) Nautor's Swan	Germán Frers	2016	Sistership of the aramid foam core/prepreg carbonfiber sandwich sloop Solleone, originally Highland Fling 15
Jasi	35.20 m (115 ft)	(Finland) Nautor's Swan	Germán Frers	2018	Sistership of the aramid foam core/prepreg carbonfiber sandwich sloop Solleone, originally Odin
Caroline 1	35.10 m (115 ft)	(New Zealand) Alloy Yachts	Ed Dubois	1994	Aluminium sloop, originally Corinthian
Astra	35.05 m (115 ft)	(England) Camper & Nicholsons	Charles Ernest Nicholson	1928	Wooden IYRU 23mR cutter, restored at Cantieri Navali Beconcini in 1989
Maiden Hong Kong	35.05 m (115 ft)	(Malaysia) Dian Kreatif Yachts	Juan Kouyoumdjian	2004	Carbonfiber oceanracing sloop
Eros	35.00 m (115 ft)	(England) John Walter Brooke & Company	William McMeek	1939	Wooden staysail schooner, originally Jeanry
Aries	35.00 m (115 ft)	(England) Camper & Nicholsons	Camper & Nicholsons	1952	Wooden ketch, has also been known as White Heather
Snow Goose	35.00 m (115 ft)	(South Africa) Insark Marine	Angelo Lavranos	1993	Aluminium sloop
Motif	35.00 m (115 ft)	(Turkey) Ağantur Yatçilik	Mustafa Ozkalay	2000	Steel gulet
Nikata II	35.00 m (115 ft)	(Finland) Baltic Yachts	Judel/Vrolijk	2015	Aramid foam core/prepreg carbonfiber sandwich sloop
Daglarca	35.00 m (115 ft)	(Turkey) Aganlar Boatyard		2016	Wooden gulet
Sojana	34.97 m (115 ft)	(England) Green Marine	Bruce Farr	2003	Fiberglass ketch
Galatea	34.85 m (114 ft)	(Croatia) Heli Yachts	Uljanik Shipbuilding Computer Systems	1998	Steel ketch, originally Dat Helja
Queen of Karia	34.85 m (114 ft)	(Turkey) Arkin Pruva	İbrahim Karataş	2006	Wooden gulet
Akhenaton	34.84 m (114 ft)	(Turkey) Mengi Yay	İbrahim Karataş	2005	Wooden gulet
Aschanti IV	34.80 m (114 ft)	(Germany) Burmester Werft	Heinrich A. Gruber	1954	Steel staysail schooner
Beagle V	34.80 m (114 ft)	(England) Pendennis Shipyard	Ed Dubois	2001	Aluminium ketch
Che II	34.75 m (114 ft)	(Poland) Sunreef Yachts		2010	Flybridge aluminium catamaran
Sirma III	34.75 m (114 ft)	(United States) Palmer Johnson	Sparkman & Stephens	1990	Auxiliary aluminium ketch, originally Astral
Music	34.70 m (114 ft)	(Turkey) Aydos Yatçilik	Turhan Soyaslan	2012	Wooden sloop
Wolfhound	34.59 m (113 ft)	(South Africa) Southern Wind	Farr Yacht Design	2017	Foam core/carbonfiber-epoxy sandwich sloop, originally Satisfaction
Kiboko Tres	34.59 m (113 ft)	(South Africa) Southern Wind	Farr Yacht Design	2018	Sistership of the foam core/carbonfiber-epoxy sandwich sloop Satisfaction
The Power of Two	34.59 m (113 ft)	(South Africa) Southern Wind	Farr Yacht Design	2019	Sistership of the foam core/carbonfiber-epoxy sandwich sloop Satisfaction
Taniwha	34.59 m (113 ft)	(South Africa) Southern Wind	Farr Yacht Design	2021	Sistership of the foam core/carbonfiber-epoxy sandwich sloop Satisfaction
Sørvind	34.59 m (113 ft)	(South Africa) Southern Wind	Farr Yacht Design	2022	Sistership of the foam core/carbonfiber-epoxy sandwich sloop Satisfaction
Path II	34.53 m (113 ft)	(Finland) Baltic Yachts	Judel/Vrolijk	2011	Aramid foam core/epoxy sandwich sloop, originally Canova
Flisvos	34.50 m (113 ft)	(Germany) Abeking & Rasmussen	Gilles Vaton	1992	Aluminium sloop, originally Arrayan II
Ecce navigo	34.50 m (113 ft)	(Turkey) Hasan Ali Bayar	İbrahim Karataş	1997	Wooden gulet
Piaffé 2	34.43 m (113 ft)	(Netherlands) Jongert	Doug Peterson	2000	Aluminium sloop, originally Bagatelle
Anemos	34.34 m (113 ft)	(Finland) Nautor's Swan	Germán Frers	1999	Aramid foam core/vinylester sandwich sloop
Mystery	34.34 m (113 ft)	(Finland) Nautor's Swan	Germán Frers	2000	Aramid foam core/vinylester sandwich sloop, originally No Logic, sistership of Anemos
Fruition II	34.34 m (113 ft)	(Finland) Nautor's Swan	Germán Frers	2002	Aramid foam core/vinylester sandwich sloop, originally Eratosthenes, sistership of Anemos
Song of the Sea	34.34 m (113 ft)	(Finland) Nautor's Swan	Germán Frers	2002	Sistership of the aramid foam core/vinylester sandwich sloop Anemos
Naiade	34.34 m (113 ft)	(Finland) Nautor's Swan	Germán Frers	2004	Aramid foam core/vinylester sandwich sloop, originally Manouella, sistership of Anemos
Billy Bud II	34.25 m (112 ft)	(Netherlands) Royal Huisman	Judel/Vrolijk	1994	Aluminium sloop, originally Saudade VIII
Sassafras II	34.20 m (112 ft)	(Netherlands) Royal Huisman	Edward A. Fontaine	2000	Aluminium sloop, originally Pamina
Obsession II	34.20 m (112 ft)	(France) Constructions Industrielles et Maritimes	Jean Berret & Olivier Racoupeau	2002	Aluminium sloop
Comanche	34.20 m (112 ft)	(United States) Hodgdon Yachts	VPLP, Guillaume Verdier	2014	Prepreg carbonfiber IRC supermaxi
Spiip III	34.17 m (112 ft)	(Netherlands) Royal Huisman	Germán Frers	2000	Aluminium sloop, originally Unfurled III
Nephele	34.17 m (112 ft)	(New Zealand) McMullen & Wing	Germán Frers	2003	Sistership of the aluminium sloop Unfurled III, originally Ipanema
Sakara	34.15 m (112 ft)	(United States) George Lawley & Son	John Beavor-Webb	1913	Steel schooner
STV Argo	34.15 m (112 ft)	(Thailand) Marsun	Bill Langan	2006	Steel staysail schooner
STV Vela	34.15 m (112 ft)	(Thailand) Marsun	Bill Langan	2020	sistership of the steel staysail schooner STV Argo
Shagala Bagala	34.14 m (112 ft)	(Finland) Baltic Yachts	Reichel/Pugh	2010	Foam core/prepreg carbonfiber sandwich sloop, originally Nilaya
Alice	34.14 m (112 ft)	(Finland) Baltic Yachts	Malcolm McKeon	2019	Foam core/prepreg carbonfiber sandwich sloop, originally Liara 4
Sandy	34.12 m (112 ft)	(Turkey) Mengi Yay	İbrahim Karataş	2007	Wooden gulet
Merrymaid	34.10 m (112 ft)	(England) Camper & Nicholsons	Charles Ernest Nicholson	1904	Wooden gaff cutter
Blue Leopard	34.10 m (112 ft)	(England) William Osborne & Sons	Laurent Giles Naval Architects	1963	Wooden ketch
Diamond For Ever	34.10 m (112 ft)	(Netherlands) Royal Huisman	Ron Holland	1987	Aluminium sloop, originally Acharné
Signe	34.10 m (112 ft)	(United States) Renaissance Yachts	Bruce King	1989	Wood/epoxy ketch
Symphonia	34.02 m (112 ft)	(Italy) Cantiere Valdettaro	Laurent Giles Naval Architects	1990	Steel sloop
Unplugged	34.02 m (112 ft)	(Italy) Cantiere Valdettaro	Laurent Giles Naval Architects	1992	Sistership of the steel sloop Symphonia, originally Parsifal
Manutara	34.02 m (112 ft)	(Italy) Cantiere Valdettaro	Laurent Giles Naval Architects	1994	Sistership of the steel sloop Symphonia, originally Mayreau
Takapuna	34.02 m (112 ft)	(Italy) Cantiere Valdettaro	Laurent Giles Naval Architects	1994	Sistership of the steel sloop Symphonia, originally Jabula A
Ree	34.02 m (112 ft)	(Italy) Cantiere Valdettaro	Laurent Giles Naval Architects	1995	Sistership of the steel sloop Symphonia, originally Parsifal II
Seljm	34.00 m (112 ft)	(Italy) Sangermani	Franco Anselmi Boretti	1980	Wooden schooner
Kawil	34.00 m (112 ft)	(United States) Derecktor Mamaroneck	Sparkman & Stephens	2000	Aluminium sloop, originally Zingaro
Moonlight	34.00 m (112 ft)	(Turkey) Bodrum Oğuz Marin		2008	Wooden gulet
Spirit of Bermuda	34.00 m (112 ft)	(United States) Rockport Marine	Bill Langan	2006	Replica of a 19th-century 3-mast wooden Bermuda sloop
Raven	34.00 m (112 ft)	(Finland) Baltic Yachts	Marcelino Botin	2023	Foam core/prepreg carbonfiber sandwich sloop with topside-mounted canting hydrofoils
Legend	33.94 m (111 ft)	(New Zealand) Alloy Yachts	Ron Holland	1999	Aluminium ketch, originally Charlatan
USA-17	34.00 m (112 ft)	(United States) Core Builders	VPLP, Oracle Racing	2009	Wingsail inshore racing carbonfiber trimaran, won the 2010 America's Cup
Aurelius II	33.90 m (111 ft)	(Netherlands) Jacht Ontwikkelings Maatschappij	Dykstra Naval Architects	2011	Aluminium sloop, originally Annagine II
Geist	33.90 m (111 ft)	(United Kingdom) Spirit Yachts	Sean McMillan	2019	Wooden sloop
Wild Oats XI	33.83 m (111 ft)	(Australia) McConaghy Boats	Reichel/Pugh	2005	aramid foam core/carbonfiber sandwich IRC supermaxi
Cygnus Montanus III	33.83 m (111 ft)	(New Zealand) Yachting Developments	Germán Frers	2016	Carbonfiber sloop
Neorion	33.80 m (111 ft)	(Netherlands) Bloemsma van Breemen	Olivier Foppe van Meer	1999	Aluminium schooner, originally Green Seagull
Silvertip B	33.80 m (111 ft)	(New Zealand) Yachting Developments	Ed Dubois	2002	Fiberglass sloop
Cefea 2	33.77 m (111 ft)	(Italy) Performance Boats	Javier Soto Acebal	2020	Prepreg carbonfiber sloop
Sensation of Auckland	33.75 m (111 ft)	(New Zealand) Sensation Yachts	Ron Holland	1989	Aluminium sloop
CQS	33.70 m (111 ft)	(New Zealand) Boatspeed Performance Sailcraft	Simonis & Voogd, Brett Bakewell-White	2004	Prepreg carbonfiber IRC supermaxi, originally Nicorette III, modernized at Southern Ocean Marine in 2016
Fidelitas	33.66 m (110 ft)	(Netherlands) Jongert		1994	Flybridge steel ketch, originally Passe-Partout II
Imagine B	33.60 m (110 ft)	(New Zealand) Alloy Yachts	Ed Dubois	1993	Aluminium sloop
Blue Eyes	33.60 m (110 ft)	(Turkey) Ağantur Yatçilik	Erkin Yağcı	2006	Steel gulet
Thalima	33.60 m (110 ft)	(South Africa) Southern Wind	Bruce Farr	2010	Foam core/carbonfiber-epoxy sandwich sloop
Infotrack	33.59 m (110 ft)	(New Zealand) TP Cookson	Juan Kouyoumdjian	2008	Prepreg carbonfiber IRC supermaxi, originally Speedboat
Toto	33.53 m (110 ft)	(United States) Palmer Johnson	Donald G. Parrot	1983	Aluminium sloop, originally Ondine VI
Keewaydin	33.53 m (110 ft)	(United States) Palmer Johnson	Niels Helleberg	1996	Aluminium ketch, originally Nazenin III
Barong D	33.51 m (110 ft)	(Italy) Performance Boats, Wally Forlì	Germán Frers	2016	Prepreg carbonfiber sloop
Iduna	33.50 m (110 ft)	(Netherlands) Gebruder de Vries Scheepsbouw	Henri Willem de Voogt	1939	Auxiliary steel ketch
Doha 2006	33.50 m (110 ft)	(France) Multiplast	Gilles Ollier	2000	Ocean racing carbonfiber catamaran, originally Club Med
Heritage M	33.50 m (110 ft)	(Turkey) (Italy) Perini Navi		2000	Steel sloop, originally Heritage
Mousetrap	33.50 m (110 ft)	(France) JFA	VPLP	2012	Carbonfiber/epoxy flybridge catamaran
Zemi	33.50 m (110 ft)	(Finland) Baltic Yachts	Malcolm McKeon	2023	Foam core/prepreg carbonfiber sandwich sloop
Shanti	33.47 m (110 ft)	(Turkey) Neta Marine		2007	Steel gulet
Inouï	33.44 m (110 ft)	(United Kingdom) Green Marine (hull) (Netherlands) Vitters (fitout)	Philippe Briand	2013	Carbonfiber sloop
RUIYING JL 110	33.42 m (110 ft)	(China) Ruiying Yacht Club	Olivier Racoupeau	2018	Flybridge aluminium catamaran
Silver Spray	33.40 m (110 ft)	(Netherlands) Scheepswerf Piet Smit		1916	Steel wishbone schooner
Moonbeam IV	33.40 m (110 ft)	(Scotland) Fife & Son	William Fife III	1920	Wooden gaff cutter
Lady Sunshine	33.40 m (110 ft)	(Netherlands) Jongert	André Runté	1990	Flybridge steel sloop, originally Conny Fever
Sunshine	33.40 m (110 ft)	Myanmar Shipyards	William Fife III	2003	Steel replica of the racing gaff schooner Sunshine (1900) and sistership Asthore (1902)

== See also ==
- Comparison of large sloops
- List of large sailing vessels
- List of motor yachts by length
- List of sailboat designers and manufacturers
- List of schooners
