= Hyperion (yacht) =

Large sloop built in 1998

Hyperion is a 155.5-foot (47.4 m) sailing yacht built by the Royal Huisman in the Netherlands in 1998 and designed by German Frers. At the time of her launch, she was the largest sloop ever built, and had the tallest mast. The 194-foot (59 m) carbon-fiber mast clears the deck of the Golden Gate Bridge by only 30 feet (9.1 m).

Hyperion is famous primarily for her owner, Silicon Valley entrepreneur Jim Clark, founder of Silicon Graphics and Netscape, who built the yacht with the aim of replacing all conventional ship board electronics with an array of integrated, touch screen computers.

At the time of launch, all systems aboard the yacht including engines and sailing systems, environmental systems, lighting, HVAC and entertainment were controlled by a network of 30 customized Silicon Graphics computers and 22 LCD touch screens at various locations throughout the yacht. Clark created a small company, Seascape, which worked in anonymity for many years above a Jenny Craig weight loss center in Menlo Park, California, to create the software for the project.

The yacht has been covered by several newspapers and magazines, as well as The New New Thing, a book by Michael Lewis.

Hyperion was surpassed as the world's largest sloop by the 48.5 m Georgia in 2000, which was surpassed by the 75.2 m Mirabella V in 2004.

== See also ==
- Luxury yachts
- Large sailing yachts
  - The Maltese Falcon
  - Athena
  - Eos
- List of large sailing yachts
- List of large sailing vessels
- Comparison of large sloops
