= Edward Du Bois =

Edward Du Bois may refer to:

- Eduard Dubois (1619–1696), Flemish-born painter active in Holland, Italy and England
- Edward Dubois (wit) (1774–1850), English wit and man of letters
- Edward C. Dubois, from the List of justices of the Rhode Island Supreme Court
- W. E. B. Du Bois (1868–1963), American sociologist, historian, and civil rights activist.
- Ed Dubois (1952–2016), English yacht designer
