= Holland Jachtbouw =

Shipyard in Zaandam, Netherlands

- Industry: Yacht Building, shipbuilding
- Founded: 1990
- Headquarters: Zaandam, Netherlands
- Area served: Worldwide
- Products: Sailing yacht, motor yacht
- Website: www.hollandjachtbouw.nl

Holland Jachtbouw is a shipyard specialized in building large sailing yachts. It is located in the municipality of Zaandam in the Netherlands.

== History ==
The shipyard was established by Chris Gongriep (1946–2016) in 1990 as De Hemmes to build lemsteraken, a traditional wooden workboat type from Lemmer. The yard acquired naval architect André Hoek's newbuild management company Dutch Built in 1998 in order to transition to aluminium sailing yachts; Thereafter Hoek cooperated closely with Gongriep, producing the largest two-mast schooner in history, Athos, in 2010. After completing a significant expansion of the shipyard's building shed, Gongriep committed suicide on December 9, 2016, and the shipyard's brand new 12,000m² facilities were subsequently rented out to fellow Dutch yachtbuilder Royal Huisman.

== List of yachts built ==
Was the longest yacht upon completion.

| year | yacht | designer | length overall | notes |
|---|---|---|---|---|
| 1996 | Sapphire | André Hoek | 30.48 m (100 ft) | aluminium sloop, now Sea Dragon |
| 1998 | Belphegor | André Hoek | 17.50 m (57 ft) | aluminium sloop, now Little Dragon |
| 1998 | Duva | André Hoek | 19.50 m (64 ft) | wooden sloop, now Joy |
| 1998 | Aeolian | André Hoek | 28.00 m (92 ft) | aluminium sloop, now Whirlwind |
| 2000 | Zuidwester | André Hoek | 14.00 m (46 ft) | steel lemsteraak |
| 2001 | Groenevecht | André Hoek | 18.50 m (61 ft) | steel lemsteraak |
| 2000 | Palmyre | André Hoek | 24.75 m (81 ft) | aluminium sloop |
| 2000 | Skipper | André Hoek | 30.50 m (100 ft) | aluminium sloop |
| 2001 | 't Vlieghent Hart | André Hoek | 16.50 m (54 ft) | steel lemsteraak |
| 2001 | Corian of Sark | André Hoek | 17.50 m (57 ft) | sistership of the aluminium sloop Belphegor, now Toucan |
| 2001 | Windrose | André Hoek | 19.50 m (64 ft) | aluminium sistership of the wooden sloop Duva |
| 2001 | Emotion | André Hoek | 25.00 m (82 ft) | aluminium sloop |
| 2001 | Windrose of Amsterdam | Gerard Dijkstra | 46.32 m (152 ft) | aluminium schooner |
| 2003 | Christoffel's Lighthouse | Gerard Dijkstra | 32.25 m (106 ft) | aluminium sloop, now Nyima |
| 2003 | Whisper | Edward A. Fontaine | 35.46 m (116 ft) | aluminium sloop |
| 2004 | Cassiopeia | Bill Langan | 32.10 m (105 ft) | aluminium motor yacht |
| 2005 | Skylge | André Hoek | 41.83 m (137 ft) | aluminium schooner, now Seabiscuit |
| 2006 | YII | William Dixon | 37.00 m (121 ft) | aluminium sloop, now A Sulana |
| 2010 | Calliope | Bill Langan | 42.28 m (139 ft) | aluminium motor yacht, now Ninkasi |
| 2010 | Athos | André Hoek | 62.00 m (203 ft) | aluminium schooner |
| 2012 | Rainbow | Starling Burgess | 39.95 m (131 ft) | aluminium replica of J-class yacht Rainbow (1934) |
| 2014 | Heureka | William Dixon | 45.00 m (148 ft) | aluminium sloop |
| 2015 | Topaz | Frank Cabot Paine | 42.62 m (140 ft) | aluminium 1935 J-class yacht original design |
| 2016 | Skade | Bill Tripp | 46.10 m (151 ft) | aluminium sloop |
| 2018 | Arizona | Knud E Hansen | 26.05 m (85 ft) | steel motor yacht with aluminium flybridge, sistership of Poseidon |
| 2018 | Poseidon | Knud E Hansen | 26.05 m (85 ft) | steel motor yacht with aluminium flybridge, sistership of Arizona |

== See also ==
- List of sailboat designers and manufacturers
- List of large sailing yachts
