= Vitters Shipyard =

Shipyard in Zwartsluis, Netherlands

- Industry: Yacht building, Shipbuilding
- Founded: 1990
- Headquarters: Zwartsluis, Netherlands
- Area served: Worldwide
- Products: Sailing yacht, Motor yacht
- Website: Official Website

Vitters Shipyard is a shipyard specialized in building large sailing yachts. It is located in the town of Zwartsluis in the Netherlands.

== History ==
The shipyard was established by Jan Vitters in 1990 to build mega yacht hulls. Soon after Louis Hamming joined Vitters, they began building sailing yachts, which resulted in the first yacht being delivered in 1993, Aphrodite I.

In 2010 Vitters expanded when they acquired Green Marine which is based in Lymington, UK. Green Marine specializes in advanced composite projects.

Vitters expanded again in 2016 through a partnership with fellow Dutch shipyard, Claasen Shipyards based in Zaandam. Both shipyards will keep their own identities, but will work together on a management level.

== List of yachts built ==
Was the longest yacht upon completion.

Year	Yacht	Designer	Length overall	Notes	Reference
1993	Aphrodite I	André Hoek	28.22 m (93 ft)	Aluminium ketch.	
1994	Thalia	Ron Holland	48.42 m (159 ft)	Steel hull with aluminium superstructure ketch.	
1994	Mariposa 3a	Ed Dubois	28.99 m (95 ft)	Aluminium sloop, now named Grit.	
1995	Ninemia	Wim de Vries Lentsch	31 m (102 ft)	Aluminium flybridge motor yacht, now named Mia Zoi.	
1997	Timeless	Georges Auzepy Brenneur	30.79 m (101 ft)	Aluminium flybridge motor yacht, now named An.	
1998	Dardanella	Vripack	36.88 m (121 ft)	Aluminium explorer motor yacht.	
1999	Aphrodite 2	André Hoek	42.67 m (140 ft)	Aluminium sloop, now named Aphrodite A.	
1999	Marguerite	Sparkman & Stephens	28.17 m (92 ft)	Aluminium ketch, now named Carmella.	
2000	That's Y	Dixon Yacht Design	30.27 m (99 ft)	GRP sloop, now named Havana of London.	
2001	Timoneer	Ed Dubois	44.75 m (147 ft)	Aluminium ketch, now named Catalina.	
2002	African Queen	Ed Dubois	43.07 m (141 ft)	Aluminium sloop, now named Koo.	
2002	Whirlaway	Ed Dubois	42.92 m (141 ft)	Aluminium sloop, now named Espiritu Del Xarey.	
2004	Gimla	Ed Dubois	42.9 m (141 ft)	Aluminium sloop, now named Guillemot.	
2005	Ghost	Luca Brenta & Co	37.25 m (122 ft)	GRP sloop.	
2005	Adele	André Hoek	54.64 m (179 ft)	Aluminium ketch, sistership of Marie.	
2006	Mystere	Bill Tripp	43.2 m (142 ft)	Aluminium hull with Carbon Fibre superstructure sloop.	
2007	Nirvana	Ed Dubois	53.49 m (175 ft)	Aluminium ketch, now named Nirvana Formente.	
2009	Erica XII	André Hoek	52.52 m (172 ft)	Aluminium sloop, now named Anne.	
2009	Cinderella IV	Bill Tripp	39 m (128 ft)	GRP ketch, now named G2.	
2010	Marie	André Hoek	54.64 m (179 ft)	Aluminium ketch, sistership of Adele.	
2010	Lady B	Ed Dubois	44.7 m (147 ft)	Aluminium sloop, now named Ningaloo.	
2011	Aglaia	Ed Dubois	66 m (217 ft)	Aluminium sloop, now named Anatta.	
2011	Sarissa	Bill Tripp	42.65 m (140 ft)	GRP sloop, now named Sharlou.	
2013	Inoui	Philippe Briand	33.4 m (110 ft)	GRP sloop.	
2013	Ganesha	Ed Dubois	46 m (151 ft)	Aluminium sloop.	
2016	Aquijo	Bill Tripp	86 m (282 ft)	Steel hull with aluminium superstructure ketch. In collaboration with Oceanco.	
2016	Unfurled	German Frers	46 m (151 ft)	Aluminium sloop.	
2016	Missy	Malcolm McKeon	33 m (108 ft)	Carbon fibre sloop.	
2017	Svea	Tore Holm	43.6 m (143 ft)	Aluminium 1937 J-class yacht original design.	
2017	Ribelle	Malcolm McKeon	32.64 m (107 ft)	Carbon fibre sloop.	
2020	Meraki	André Hoek	49.7 m (163 ft)	Aluminium ketch.	
Under construction
Planned delivery	Yacht	Designer	Length overall	Notes	Reference
2022	Alea	Mani Frers	56 m (184 ft)	Launched	
2023	Project 3090	German Frers	59 m (194 ft)		
2024	Project 3093	Reichel / Pugh Yacht Design	44 m (144 ft)		

== See also ==
- List of sailboat designers and manufacturers
- List of large sailing yachts
