= Douce France =

Douce France is a 138-foot (42 m) luxury sailing catamaran design by VPLP design and built by Alumarine in Brittany, France. At its launch in 1998, she was the largest sailing cat ever built and won most innovative Sailing Yacht 1999 - Showboats Design Awards. It was built at Alu Marine also underwent a refit in 2009 and 2015. The exterior and interior design was done overall by Peteghem & Lauriot Prevost (VPLP design). The vessel is known for a panoramic window interior lounge, one of the areas along with the teak wood aft deck, upper level cockpit, and the interior cabins in the twin hulls.

The Douce France was the largest sail catamaran in the world, and significant step from previous designs in this history of these types of vessels. Douce France has been analyzed in attempts to build similar large sailing catamarans especially for luxury cruising.

Douce France has a displacement of 120 tons and has a range of 3,500 nautical miles (6,500 km; 4,000 mi). The vessel has capacity for up to 12 guests and 8 crew. Typical sail cruise speed is 9 knots (17 km/h; 10 mph) and maximum speed under sail is 19 knots (35 km/h; 22 mph). This vessel has twin diesel engines and can motor at 12 knots (22 km/h; 14 mph). The hulls are made of aluminum.

Typically operating as a charter vessel in the South Pacific, it has six cabins and has various items to support hospitality business, such as wine cellar and various tenders.

Specifications:

- Length (Overall) 42.2m / 138.5'
- Length (waterline) 38.25m / 125.5 ft
- Beam 15.4 meters
- Draft 2.5 meters
- Sail area - 206m2
- Gross tonnage - 218 gt
- Displacement - 120 tons

As of 2018 the vessel is flagged to Belgium.

== Designers ==
Design firm was VPLP design and it was built at Chantier Naval Alumarine in 1998.

- Naval Architecture:Marc Van Peteghem and Vincent Lauriot-Prevost, Marc Van Peteghem
  - Additional designers: Vincent Lauriot-Prevost
- Interior Designers: Anne-Monique Bonadei

== Legacy ==
The same design firm went on make an even larger sailing catamaran, the 145 foot Hemisphere. The sponsors of that yacht spent time aboard the Douce France, which aided in developing that yacht which was completed in 2011. Unlike Douce France, Hemisphere has quarters outside the hulls and additional deck but carried on tradition of a large deck area.

== See also ==
- List of large sailing yachts
- Hemisphere (yacht) (44.2 m sailing catamaran yacht)
- IDEC SPORT (Sailing trimaran won Jules Verne trophy for circumnavigation)
