= Baltic Yachts =

Shipyard in Finland

- Company type: Private
- Industry: Transportation
- Founded: 1973
- Headquarters: Larsmo, Finland; Jakobstad, Finland, Palma de Mallorca, Spain, Finland, Spain
- Number of locations: 3
- Products: yacht
- Services: vessel repair, yacht and small boat repowering, upgrades, full service boat marina facility
- Website: https://www.balticyachts.fi/

Baltic Yachts is a shipyard specialized in sailing yachts. It is located in the municipality of Larsmo in Finland, where it is the largest employer. The shipyard was established in 1973 and now produces sailing yachts between 50 feet (15 m) and 197 feet (60 m) in length. Advanced and light materials, such as carbon fiber and Kevlar are used in the construction. The company’s clientele consists of individuals with a net worth of at least 30 million US dollars.

== History ==
Baltic Yachts was established in 1973 when five young professionals from the boatbuilding industry left Nautor to found their own company, which became Baltic Yachts. The founders were Per-Göran “PG” Johansson, Nils Luoma, Jan-Erik Nyfelt, Tor Hinders, and Ingmar Sundelin.

At that time, most sailboat hulls were made of solid laminate. The boatbuilders who left Nautor wanted to build lighter and higher-performance yachts, specifically using sandwich construction techniques.[9] At Baltic, the hulls were built as layered structures with balsa used as the core material.[9] The result was a lighter and stiffer structure that also had better insulation properties.

The company was owned by Hollming from 1977 to 1991, when it was sold to its operating management.

In 2005, the company completed its last series-produced yacht model, the Baltic 56. All newer models have been built as one-off custom pieces. Often, the yacht’s order contract specifies that no second identical vessel may be built. For this reason, once the yacht is completed, its molds are destroyed.

In 2011, Baltic Yachts built the world’s largest composite-structured ketch, completed that year, measuring 59.9 meters in length and 66.7 meters including the bowsprit. The vessel’s working name was Panamax, and it was commissioned by a European private individual. Building the vessel required 1,600 person-years of work, employing around 200 people over a couple of years.[12] The vessel was later named Hetairos.

In 2013, Baltic Yachts became 80% owned by the German Ottobock Group. Ottobock manufactures orthopedic aids. Its CEO, Hans Georg Näder, had over the years ordered six vessels from Baltic Yachts. These include Pink Gin VI, the world’s largest carbon-fiber sloop, that is, a single-masted sailing vessel.

== Boats ==
Boats produced include:

- Baltic 33
- Baltic 35
- Baltic 37
- Baltic 38 DP
- Baltic 39
- Baltic 40
- Baltic 42
- Baltic 42 DP
- Baltic 43
- Baltic 46
- Baltic 47
- Baltic 48 DP
- Baltic 50
- Baltic 51
- Baltic 52
- Baltic 55 DP
- Baltic 58
- Baltic 64
- Baltic 66
- Baltic 73
- Baltic 142

== See also ==
- List of sailboat designers and manufacturers
- List of large sailing yachts
