= Su Marine Yachts =

Turkish shipyard

- Industry: Yacht Building, Shipbuilding
- Founded: 2007
- Headquarters: Istanbul, Turkey
- Area served: Worldwide
- Products: Sailing Yachts, Motor Yachts
- Website: Official Website

Su Marine Yachts is a Turkish shipbuilding and boat building company based in Istanbul.

Su Marine builds luxury sailing and motor yachts.

== History ==
SU Marine Ship Yard company was incorporated in 2007. SU MARINE’s roots date more than 40 years ago, and was known as well for being the first composite boat builder in Turkey.

SU Marine is known for building yachts up to 50 metres (160 ft).

== The ship yard ==
SU Marine yard is located in Tuzla, Istanbul next to the Sabiha Gökçen International Airport on the coast of the Marmara Sea.

SU Margine has an 8,000 square metres (9,600 yd^{2}) facility including four large yachts building areas, 600 square metres (720 yd^{2}) administrative and engineering office space, 400 square metres (480 yd^{2}) interior joinery workshop, 300 square metres (360 yd^{2}) stainless-steel workshop, 180 square metres (220 yd^{2}) wharehouse space including special area for sensitive items and 100 square metres (120 yd^{2}) paint facility.

== Capabilities ==
The yard uses building techniques including cold molded wood epoxy, composite, steel and aluminium.

== SU MARINE Super Luxury Sailing Yachts Launches and Reviews ==
ROXANE is a cold molded wood epoxy ketch with a total 153.7 feet length overall.

ZELDA is a cold molded wood epoxy ketch with a total overall length of 132.50 feet designed by Tanju Kalaycıoğlu from Taka Yachts Naval Architecture and "Neslihan Kibaroglu". as an interior designer.

ILIOS is a cold molded wood epoxy ketch with a total overall length of 90 feet designed by Tanju Kalaycıoğlu. Ilios has won three times in a row from 2004 to 2007 the "Bordum Regatta Cup". in the classic sailing ship category.

== See also ==
- List of large sailing yachts
- List of shipbuilders and shipyards
- List of boat builders
