= Hemisphere (yacht) =

Sailing catamaran

Hemisphere is the largest sailing catamaran (two hulls) and the largest sailing private yacht catamaran in the world since 2011. She is 145 feet (44 m) long and built by boat builder Pendennis (UK). The vessel has won five different industry awards, including for the interior finishing. In suitable weather, Hemisphere goes 13 knots (24 km/h; 15 mph), with a top sailing speed of 20 knots. VPLP collaborated with Michael Leach Design for the interior design, and the yacht has over 1300 square feet of deck space. Some of the deck spaces include areas including the wheelhouse, flybridge, and salon.

Although Hemisphere was completed in the UK at Pendennis, it was started at another yard and had to be towed, partially complete to the new yard.

Hemisphere was designed by Van PeteghemLauriot Prévost (VPLP) who designed the America's Cup winner, sailing trimaran Groupama 3 and the large sailing catamaran Douce France at 136 ft (41 meters) in length according to Boat International.

Specifications:

- Gross tonnage: 499 tons (this is type of measure of interior volume not weight of boat)
- Displacement 300 tons
- Length 145 ft (44 meters)
- Beam 54.5 feet (16.6 meters)
- Mast height 174-foot (53-meter)
- Sail area 12,037 (max) square feet

== See also ==
- List of large sailing yachts
