= Aquijo (yacht) =

Yacht owned by Kjell Inge Røkke

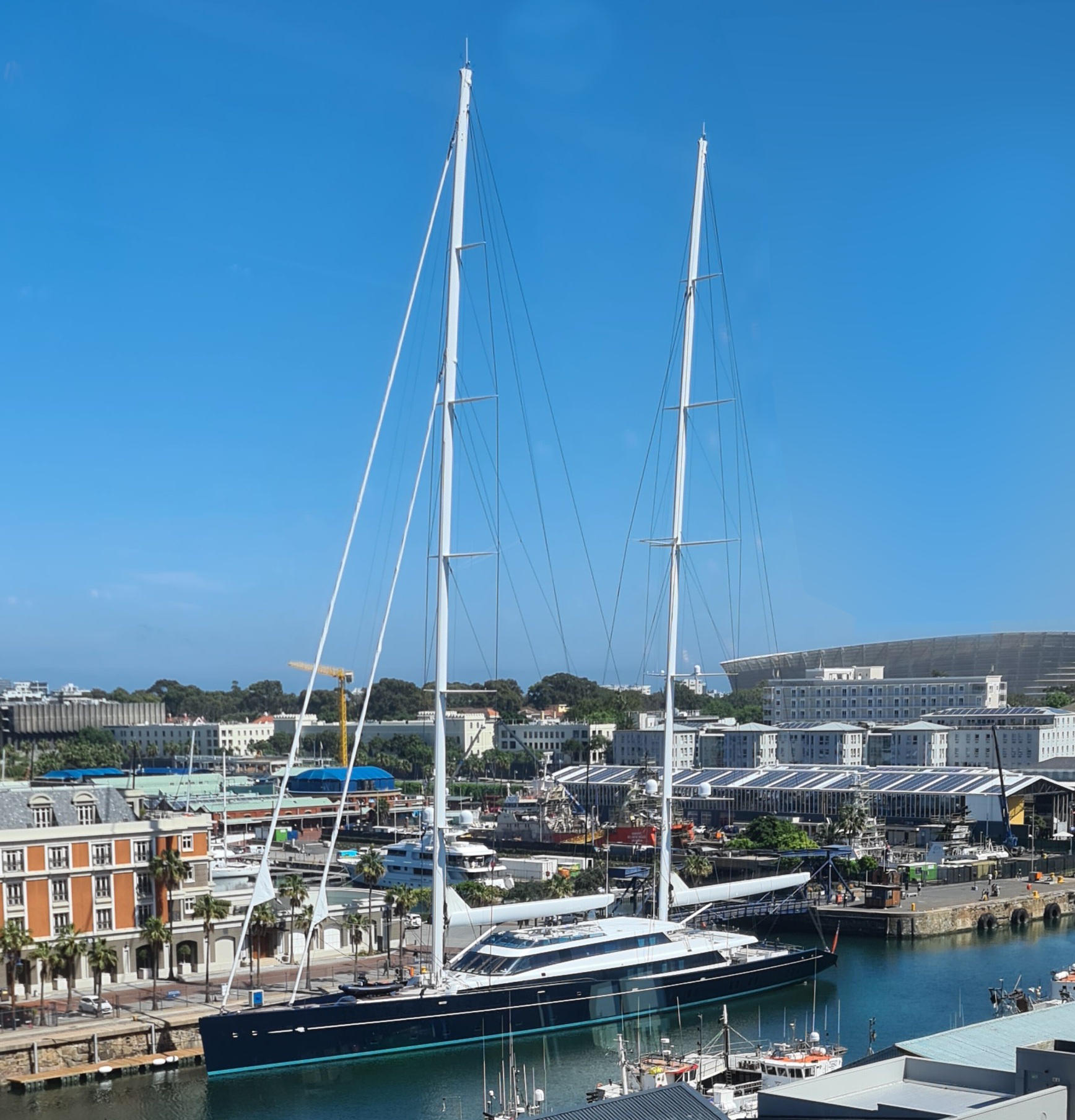
- Aquijo, Cape Town, South Africa, 2025.

History

Cayman Islands
- Name: Aquijo
- Owner: Kjell Inge Røkke
- Builder: Oceanco / Vitters Shipyard
- Yard number: Oceanco Y711 / Vitters 3069
- Launched: 2015
- In service: 2016
- Identification: IMO number: 1012529; MMSI number: 319085900; Callsign: ZGFC8

General characteristics
- Class & type: Sailing yacht
- Tonnage: 1538 gross tons
- Length: 86 m (282 ft)
- Beam: 14.48 m (47.5 ft)
- Draught: 5.23 m (17.2 ft)
- Speed: 17.50 knots (32 km/h) (max)
- Capacity: 12 guests
- Crew: 17

The 86 m (282 ft) superyacht Aquijo was launched at the Oceanco yard in Alblasserdam. United States based Tripp Design Naval Architects designed the exterior of Aquijo, with interior design by Dölker + Voges GmbH.

As of June 2018, she is the largest ketch in the world.

Aquijo is available as a charter yacht.

== Design ==
The dimensions are: length is 86 m (282 ft), beam is 14.48 m (47.5 ft) and had a draught of 5.23 m (17.2 ft). The hull is built out of steel while the superstructure is made out of aluminium with teak laid decks. The yacht is Lloyd's registered, issued by Cayman Islands. She has a sail area of 3,995 m^{2}.

== See also ==
- List of large sailing yachts
- List of yachts built by Oceanco
- Luxury yacht
- Oceanco
- Vitters
