= Aegean Yacht =

Shipyard based in Bodrum, Turkey

Aegean Yacht is a shipyard and ship builder based in Bodrum, Turkey. The company was established in 1976 by Sinan Ozer. It designs, builds and sells turn key yachts internationally.

== Profile ==
Aegean Yacht owns 15,000 m2 of a seaside boatyard and builds steel vessels up to 80m LOA with MCA class, working on a custom line principle to give its clients practically unlimited possibilities in realizing their ideas.

So far Aegean Yacht has completed more than 40 yachts from 16 to 50 meters LOA, some of which have been exported to Australia, Caribbean, Thailand, Egypt, Eritrea, Maldives, Italy, France, Germany, Portugal, Spain, Croatia, Greece, Canary Islands, Malta, Djibouti, United Arab Emirates, Russia and many other world destinations.

== List of yachts ==
| Hull No. | Year | Project | Length overall in meters (without bowsprit) | Name | Destination |
|---|---|---|---|---|---|
| 1 | 1978 | Aegean - 53 | 16.00 | Bebek | Turkey |
| 2 | 1988 | M/S/Y | 21.00 | Atlas I | Turkey |
| 3 | 1988 | M/S/Y | 21.00 | Atlas II | Turkey |
| 4 | 1988 | M/S/Y | 19.00 | Zorba | Portugal |
| 5 | 1989 | M/S/Y | 21.00 | Azura | Greece |
| 6 | 1989 | Aegean - 74 | 21.00 | Argo | Croatia |
| 7 | 1991 | Aegean - 74 | 23.00 | Savruga | Djibouti |
| 8 | 1991 | Aegean - 74 | 23.00 | Beluga | England |
| 9 | 1991 | Aegean - 82 | 26.00 | Nobile | Malta |
| 10 | 1992 | Aegean - 72G | 22.00 | Farilya | Croatia |
| 11 | 1993 | Aegean - 111G | 34.00 | Magic Life | Australia |
| 12 | 1993 | M/S/Y | 20.00 | Dilara-I | Gibraltar |
| 13 | 1994 | M/S/Y | 24.00 | Elegante | England |
| 14 | 1995 | Aegean - 82 | 25.00 | Levante | Maldives |
| 15 | 1995 | Aegean - 82 | 25.00 | Salute | Maldives |
| 16 | 1996 | Aegean - 82 | 26.00 | Biga | Italy |
| 17 | 1996 | Aegean - 65 | 20.00 | Kalyeta | Italy |
| 18 | 1998 | Aegean - 108G | 33.00 | Aegina (renamed “Gem”) | England |
| 19 | 1998 | Aegean - 108G | 33.00 | Boreas (renamed “Boreas of Katharina”) | Yemen |
| 20 | 1999 | Aegean - 89G | 27.00 | Aniletta | Italy |
| 21 | 1999 | Aegean - 89G | 27.00 | Barketta (renamed “Alisa”) | Croatia |
| 22 | 1999 | Aegean - 95G | 29.00 | Dream Voyager | Maldives |
| 23 | 2002 | Aegean - 72G | 22.00 | Escapade | France |
| 24 | 2002 | Aegean - 148G | 45.00 | Grand Magic | UAE |
| 25 | 2002 | Aegean - 67MY | 20.50 | Xanax | Germany |
| 26 | 2003 | Aegean - 78MS | 23.90 | Myra | Italy |
| 27 | 2003 | Aegean - 78MS | 23.90 | Plava Zvijezda (“Blue Star”) | Croatia |
| 28 | 2003 | Aegean - 78MS | 23.90 | Keyif | Djibouti |
| 29 | 2006 | Aegean - 105MY | 32.00 | Amazon-A | Turkey |
| 30 | 2004 | Aegean - 85MS | 25.80 | Theocara II | Malta |
| 31 | 2005 | Aegean - 128 G | 39.00 | Sea Dream | Turkey |
| 32 | 2005 | Aegean - 90G | 27.50 | Santa Maria | Bulgaria |
| 33 | 2005 | Aegean - 87SY | 26.60 | Spirit of the East | England |
| 34 | 2005 | Aegean - 74MS | 22.50 | Luopan | England |
| 35 | 2006 | Aegean - 74MS | 22.50 | Araminta | Turkey |
| 36 | 2006 | Aegean - 74MS | 22.50 | Faye | UAE |
| 37 | 2007 | Aegean - 112MY | 34.00 | La Sultane | England |
| 38 | 2007 | Aegean - 164G | 50.00 | Galileo | Russia |
| 39 | 2007 | Aegean - 115SY | 35.00 | Kairos | Germany |
| 40 | 2009 | Aegean - 164G | 50.00 | Montigne | UNDER CONSTRUCTION |
| 41 | 2008 | Aegean - 24M | 24.00 | Rosa | Turkey |
| 42 | 2008 | Aegean - 24M | 24.00 | Diva | UNDER CONSTRUCTION |

== See also ==
- List of shipbuilders and shipyards
- Luxury yachts
- List of large sailing yachts
