= Eos (yacht) =

Three-masted Bermuda rigged schooner

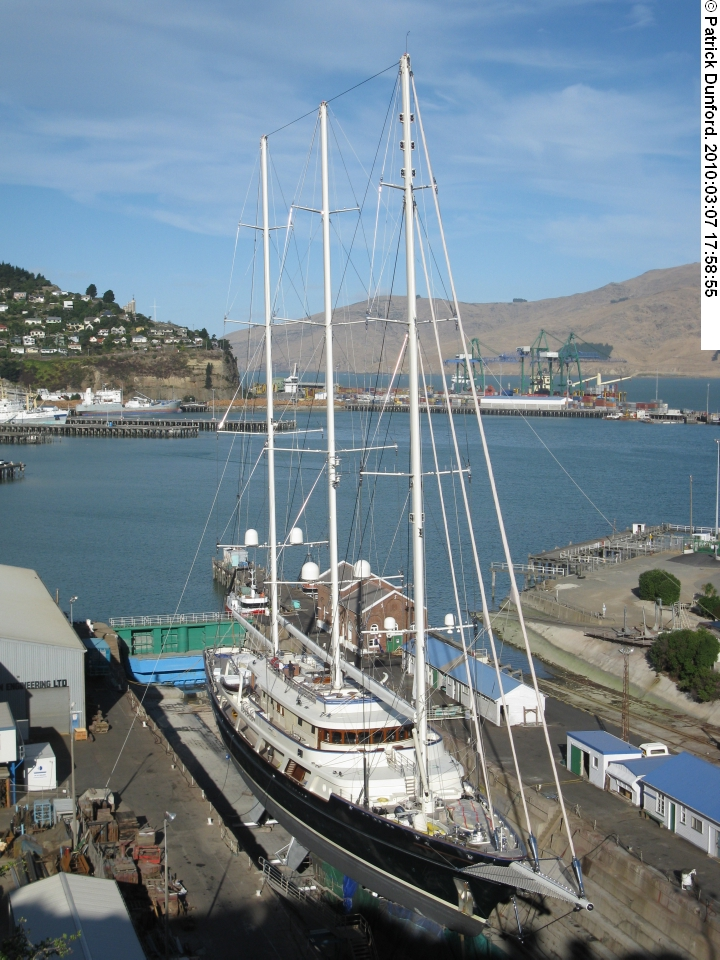
- Eos in Lyttelton, New Zealand, Mar. 7, 2010

History

Cayman Islands
- Name: Eos
- Namesake: Eos, Greek goddess of dawn
- Launched: 2006
- Identification: IMO number: 9377456; MMSI number: 319087000; Callsign: ZCPM3

General characteristics
- Tonnage: 1,500 GT
- Length: 304.86 ft (92.92 m) LOA (including bowsprit); 271 ft (83 m) LOD; 233 feet (71 m) LWL
- Beam: 44.29 ft (13.50 m)
- Propulsion: Twin screw with 2 × 2,333 hp (1,740 kW) MTU diesel engines
- Sail plan: 3-masted Bermuda rigged schooner
- Speed: 16 knots (30 km/h) maximum
- Complement: 16 guests, approx. 21 crew. Two chefs, three engineers, nine deck crew, and captains and stewardesses.
- Notes: Aluminum hull and superstructure

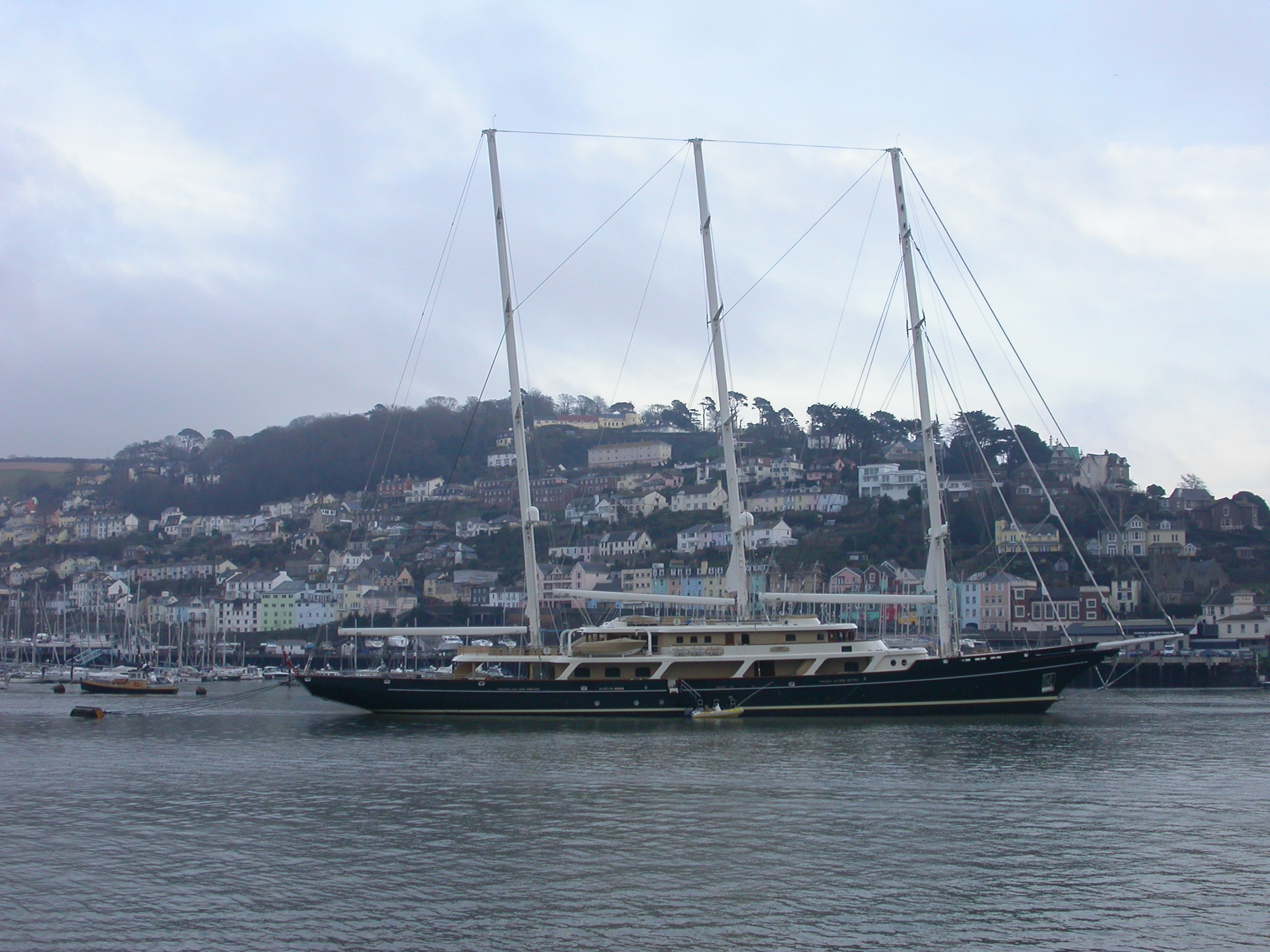
Yacht Eos moored in Dartmouth, UK, February 2008

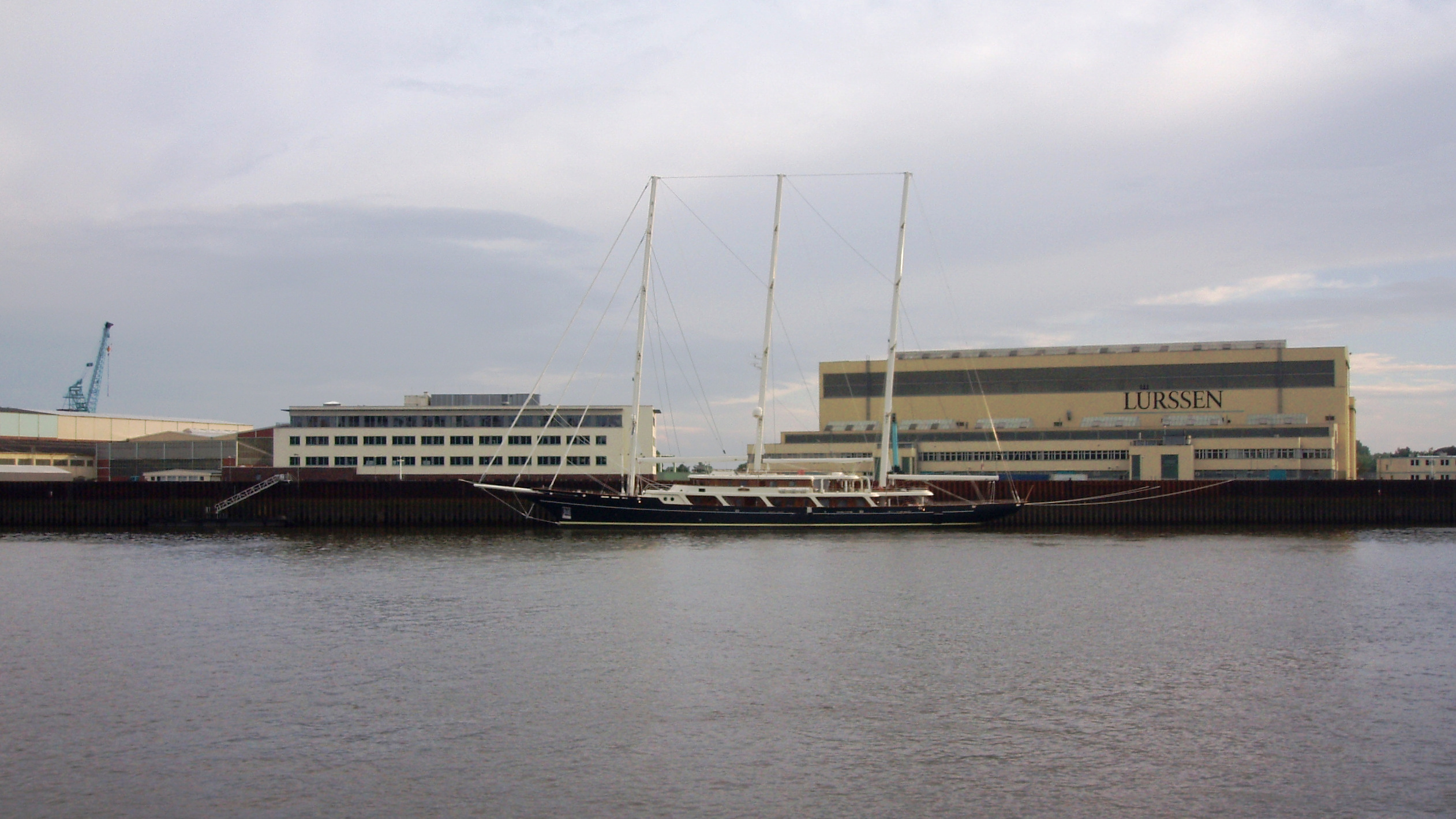
Eos at the Lürssen shipyard

Eos is a three-masted Bermuda-rigged schooner. The ship is one of the largest private sailing yachts in the world, and as of 2009 was owned by movie and media billionaire Barry Diller, husband of fashion designer Diane von Fürstenberg. According to a 2007 article in Harper's Bazaar, Eos features a figurehead of von Fürstenberg sculpted by Anh Duong. Its overall length measures approximately 305 feet (92.92m).

== Construction ==
Designed by Antonio Ferrer, a graduate of Westlawn Institute of Marine Technology, Eos was launched in Bremen, Germany from the Lürssen yard in 2006. The ship took three years to build. When launched, she "knocked Athena off the number one spot [for largest sailing yacht]." Bill Langan was the designer, Rondal/Huisman supplied the rig, and the remaining naval architecture was completed by Lürssen. The interior was designed by François Catroux. The 200 feet (61 m) tall masts are "the maximum height allowed to enable the craft to pass underneath bridges cross the globe."

== Size ==
According to the San Francisco Bay Area sailing magazine Latitude 38, the Eos is longer overall than her nearest rival, The Maltese Falcon. However, much of the length of Eos is in the bowsprit, and although she is slightly beamier than The Maltese Falcon, though The Maltese Falcon is 14 feet (4.3 m) longer on deck and over 20 feet (6.1 m) longer at the waterline, as seen in the table below: Another very similar style of boat is the older yacht Athena, which has more traditional sail plan but is general smaller, and another example is the Black Pearl, which was delivered in 2018 and is larger overall but like The Maltese Falcon uses a three-mast DynaRig.

Name	LOA	LOD	LWL	Beam
Black Pearl	348 feet (106 m)			49 feet (15 m)
Eos	305 feet (93 m)	271 feet (83 m)	233 feet (71 m)	44.2 feet (13.5 m)
The Maltese Falcon	289 feet (88 m)	285 feet (87 m)	256 feet (78 m)	42 feet (13 m)
Athena	295 feet (90 m)	253 feet (77 m)	198 feet (60 m)	40 feet (12 m)

In 2007, a BBC headline declared Eos the largest, saying "The world's largest private yacht, owned by an American millionaire, is in a south Devon harbour." Other news outlets have also come out for Eos as the world's largest private yacht.

== Press coverage ==
Press coverage of Eos written for non-sailors describes the ship with phrases like "world's largest," (despite the opinion of the Latitude 38 "sailing experts"). A 2009 news story about Eos' arrival in Fremantle, Australia appears designed to reinforce the glamor and mystique of luxury yachting, (if not envy and/or daydreaming). It claims that not only is the ship "the world's largest yacht," but that "Little is known about the yacht's interior, kept a secret by Mr. Diller, but it is believed to boast a glass staircase and panoramic views astern." The outgoing captain was quoted as saying, "I thoroughly enjoy it ... I have long, unstructured hours and an ever-changing itinerary. We have no set route but travel mainly between the Mediterranean and the Caribbean."

The ship is "valued in excess of US$150 million."

Latitude 38 describes Eos' owner, Barry Diller, creator of Fox Broadcasting Company, as "currently the Chairman of Expedia and the Chairman and Chief Executive Officer of IAC/InterActiveCorp ... parent of companies including Home Shopping Network, Ticketmaster, Match.com and others," noting that "In 2005, Diller received $295 million in compensation, the highest of any executive in the United States."

When the designer of Eos, Bill Langan, died in December 2010, the yacht was mentioned in his company's article commemorating his work.

== Fire ==
On June 30, 2012, at around 15:00 (CEST), the ship caught fire outside the island of Ormøya in Oslo, Norway. Barry Diller and his wife were ashore at the time. The crew took the first response to the fire and controlled the situation until the Norwegian fire department and the harbour police arrived at 16:15 (CEST). The fire was successfully extinguished by 20:00 (CEST) and the ship made a safe return to port for damage assessment. There were no personal injuries. The fire did, however, cause severe damage to the top decks, whilst the rest of the yacht escaped virtually undamaged. Diller described the incident as being "no problem", emphasizing his relief that everyone escaped unharmed.

== See also ==
- List of large sailing yachts
- List of yachts built by Lürssen
- Luxury yachts
