= Nodosa =

Shipyard in Spain

Nodosa S.L.
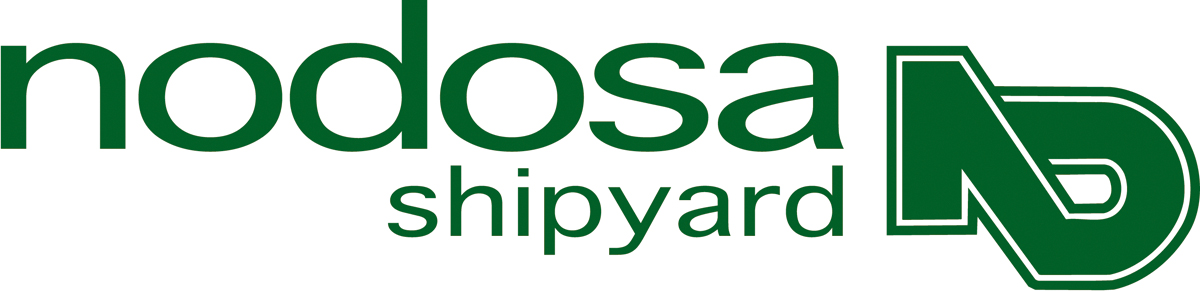

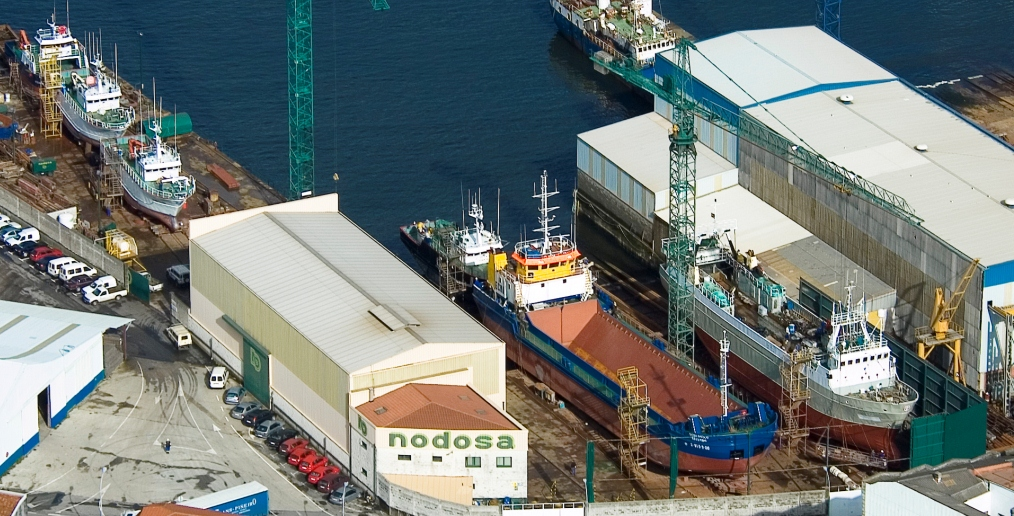
- Company type: Limited Society
- Industry: Shipbuilding, Shiprepair.
- Founded: 1982
- Founder: Don Manuel Dopico LamasGalicia Don Jaime Novas García Galicia
- Headquarters: Bueu, (Pontevedra). Galicia Galicia, Spain Spain
- Number of locations: l
- Products: Shipbuilding, Shiprepair
- Number of employees: From 50 to 100
- Website: http://www.nodosa.com/

Nodosa Shipyard is a shipyard in Bueu, Spain, dedicated to the construction, modification and repair of all kinds of metal hull vessels of up to 150 meters length, as well as general industrial manufacturing.

Located in the Galicia region, in Northwest Spain, the shipyard currently has three operational centers working in the province of Pontevedra. These consist of a factory in the parish of Bueu, the yard and repair center in the Marin Port Authority located in the homonymous parish, and the workshop located in the city of Pontevedra, which is the provincial capital.

== History ==
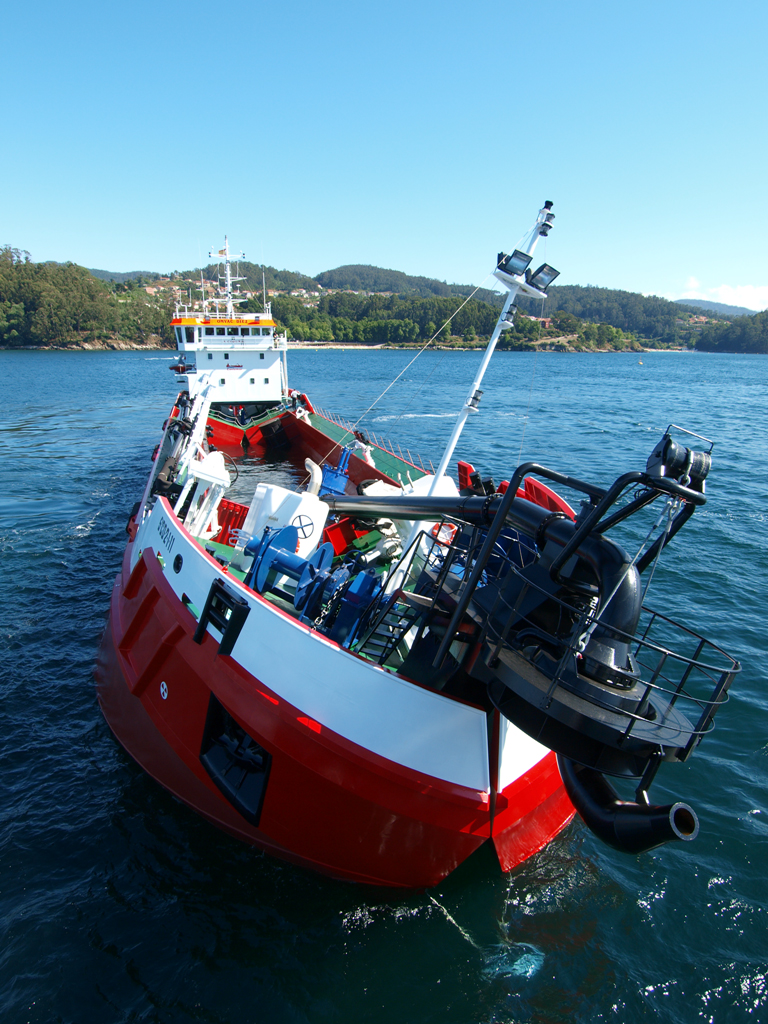
Split hopper dredger "Omvac Diez"

Nodosa Shipyard was established over 40 years ago as an auxiliary company in the metal industry. In 1982, it inaugurated its boiler workshop, and in the early 90's, it acquired the concession of a small dock. After successive stages of growth and expansion, the boiler workshop became what is the current factory and the head office. The small docks have become today's shipyard. Other workshops have been added in parallel, as the mechanical workshop.

On January 19, 2015, the company formalized the acquisition of Factoria Naval de Marin shipyard (FNM), which includes both facilities and the granting of land use, and also the property over the historical shipbuilder and its brand Marin Luxury Yachts names.

== Marine division ==
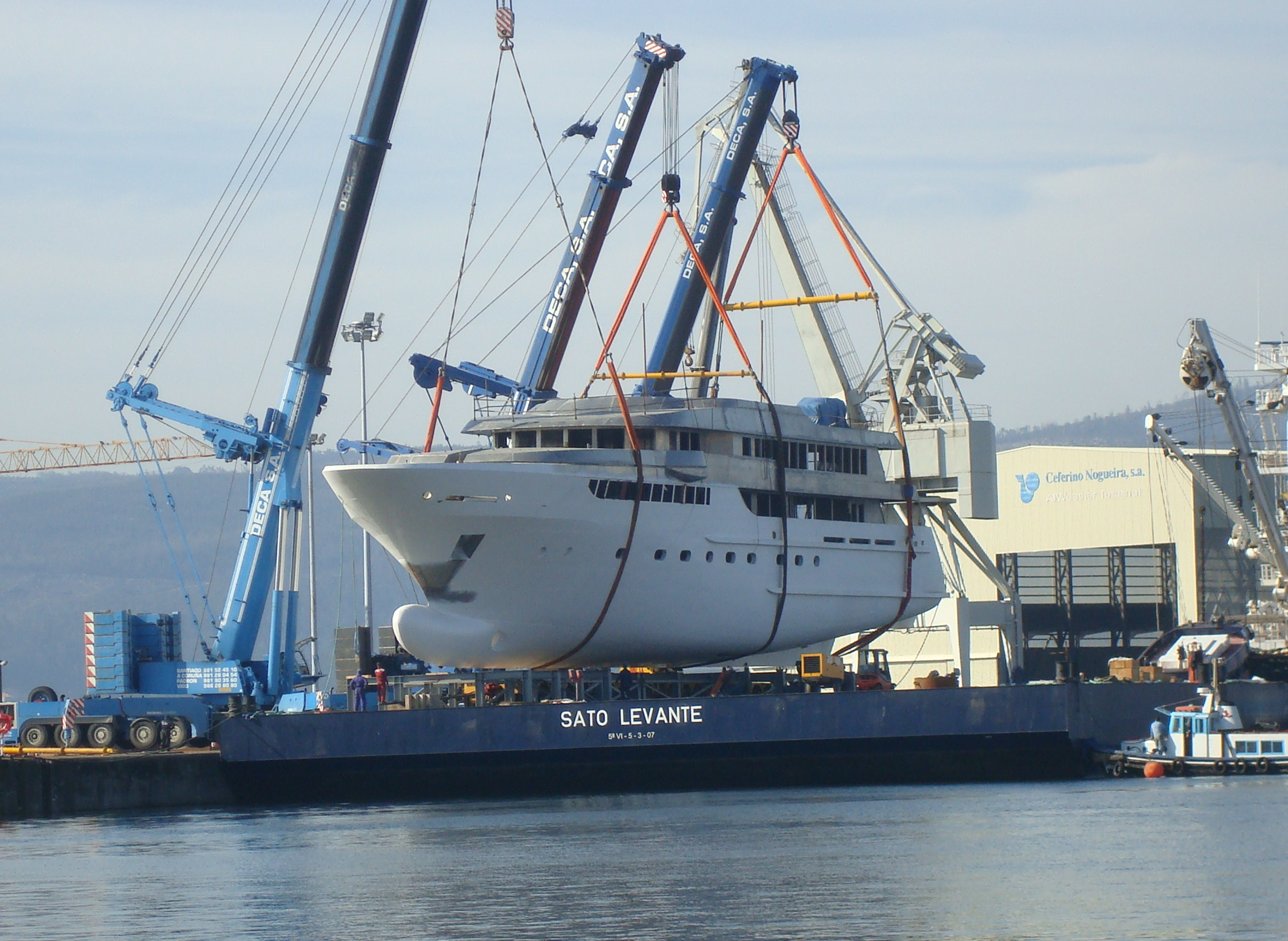
Yacht "Y-102"

Dedicated exclusively to shipbuilding and ship repair of steel hull vessels.

The shipyard builds mainly tugs and maritime assistance vessels, dredgers and port workboats as pontoons, barges and lighters. It also builds cargo ships (multipurpose), tankers, offshore vessels and fish boats as tuna fishing vessels, long liners, trawlers, purse seiners or auxiliary vessels for aquaculture and trap.

The construction of fishing vessels gave rise to the company, thanks to a geographical linkage to a seafaring region as the Rías Baixas, Galicia, where fishing represents one of the most important economic activities.

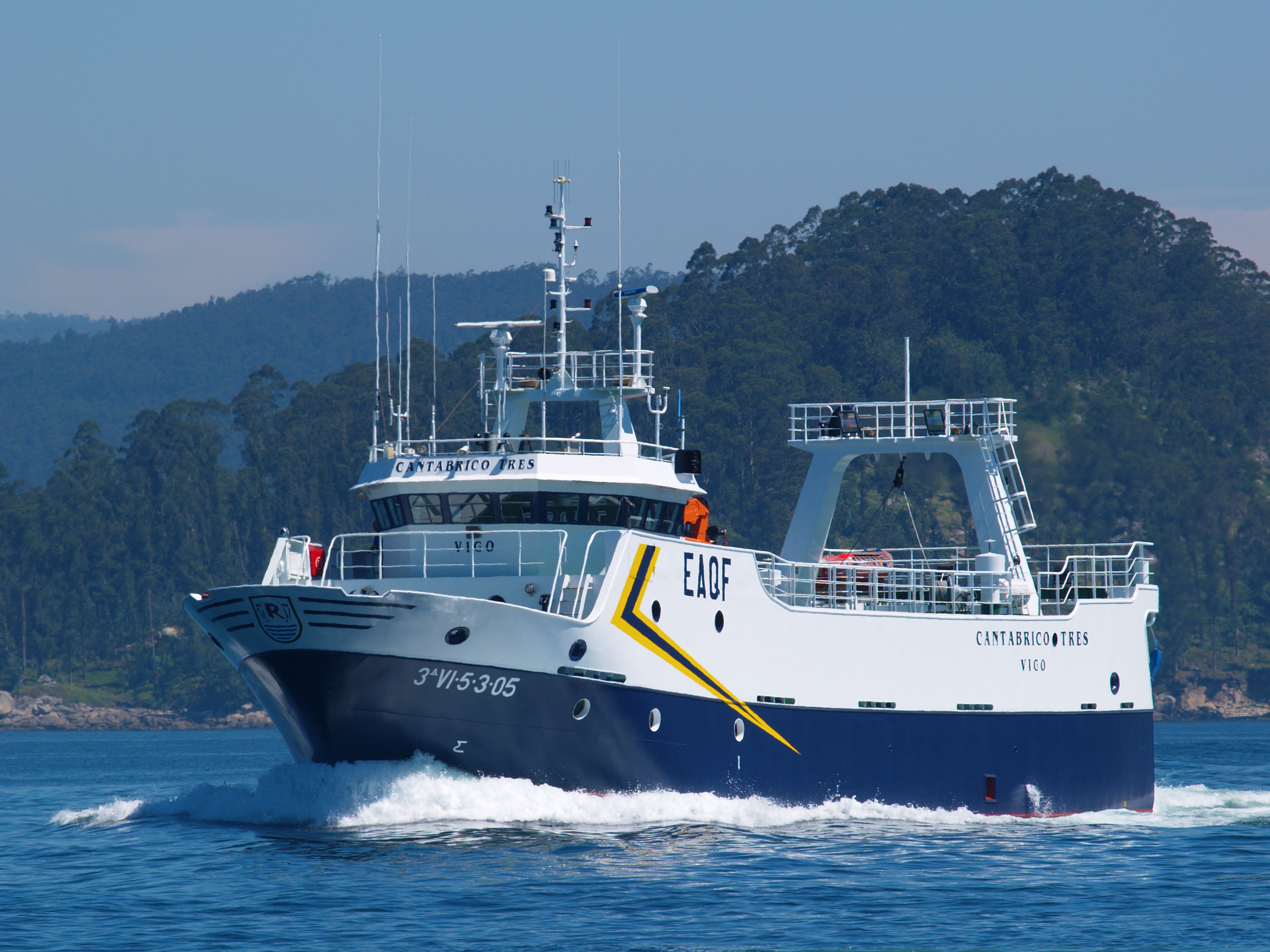
Trawler "Cantábrico Tres".

Other ship buildings included submarines of different capabilities that allow passengers to view the seabed, passenger vessels for commercial and tourist routes, sailboats of different dimensions, yachts, mega yachts, merchant vessels, tankers, any kind of carrying vessel, platforms support and rescue vessels and other offshore vessels, ferries or any other kind of boats.

Turnkey manufacturing is another important area in the company. Nodosa covers works commissioned by other shipyards, whether they are logistics services, cutting or material forming; producing blocks; carrying out any of the stages in shipbuilding: hull, superstructure, fitting out, piping.

The shipyard performs repair, modernization and conversion of ships, conducted both in its facilities and afloat. As for significant figures, the average values by type of repair in the period 2001-2013 are shown below:

- Sleep way repairs average: 86.62
- Afloat repairs average: 48.38
- Total repairs average: 135

== Industrial Division ==
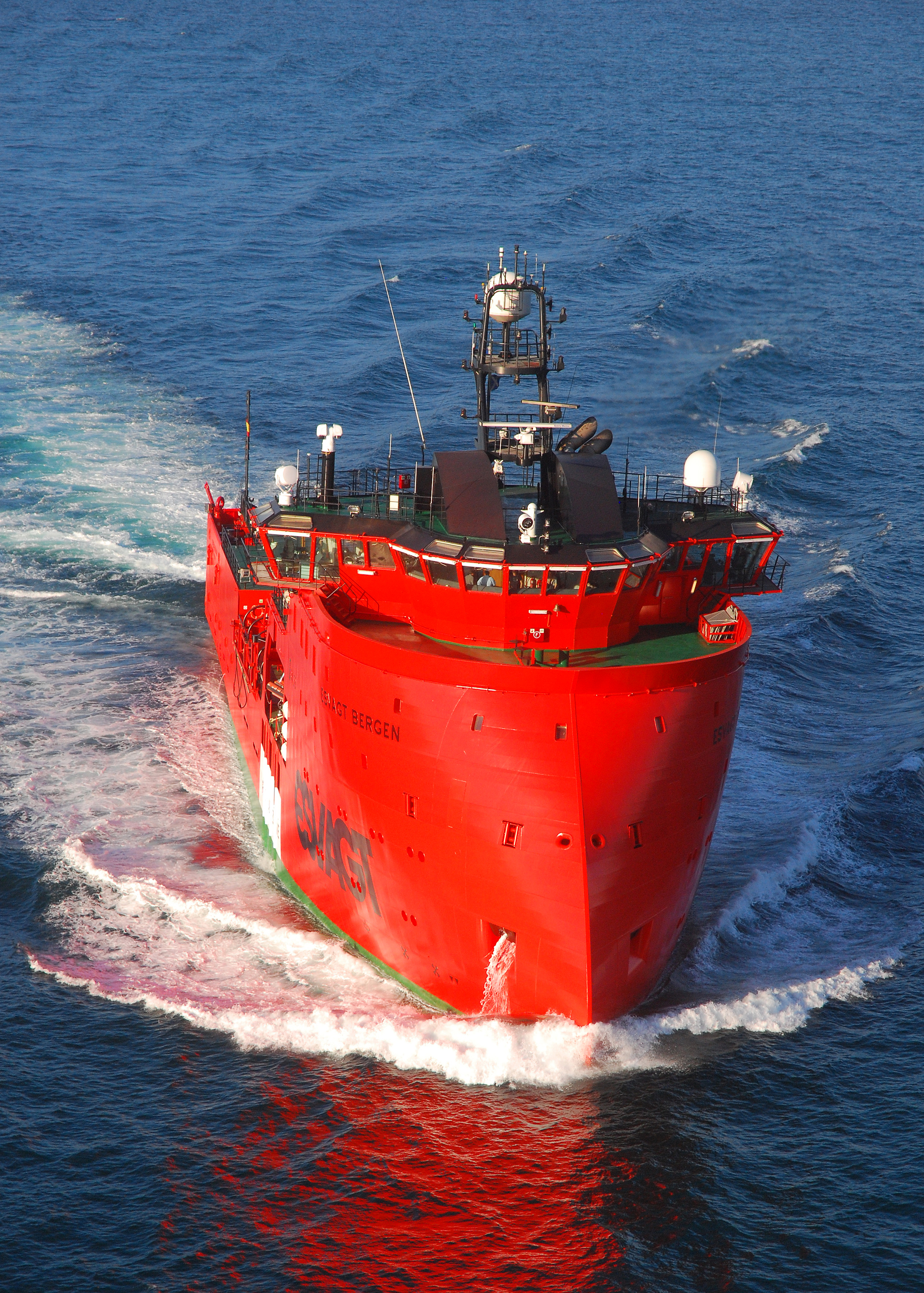
Supplier "ESVAGT Bergen"

Industrial Division has gradually diversified into different sectors, such as manufacturing and ship repair, maintenance and industrial fitting, manufacture of metal structures for construction, it also produced different elements related to such traditional sectors as the granite, timber and catching sectors, or to such leading edge fields as wind power and aeronautics.

The company has an independent mechanical workshop, which has specialized machinery for work and machine different parts used in the shipyard or in other outside companies.

Finally, the company has carried out works of design, manufacture and assembly in different industrial sectors.

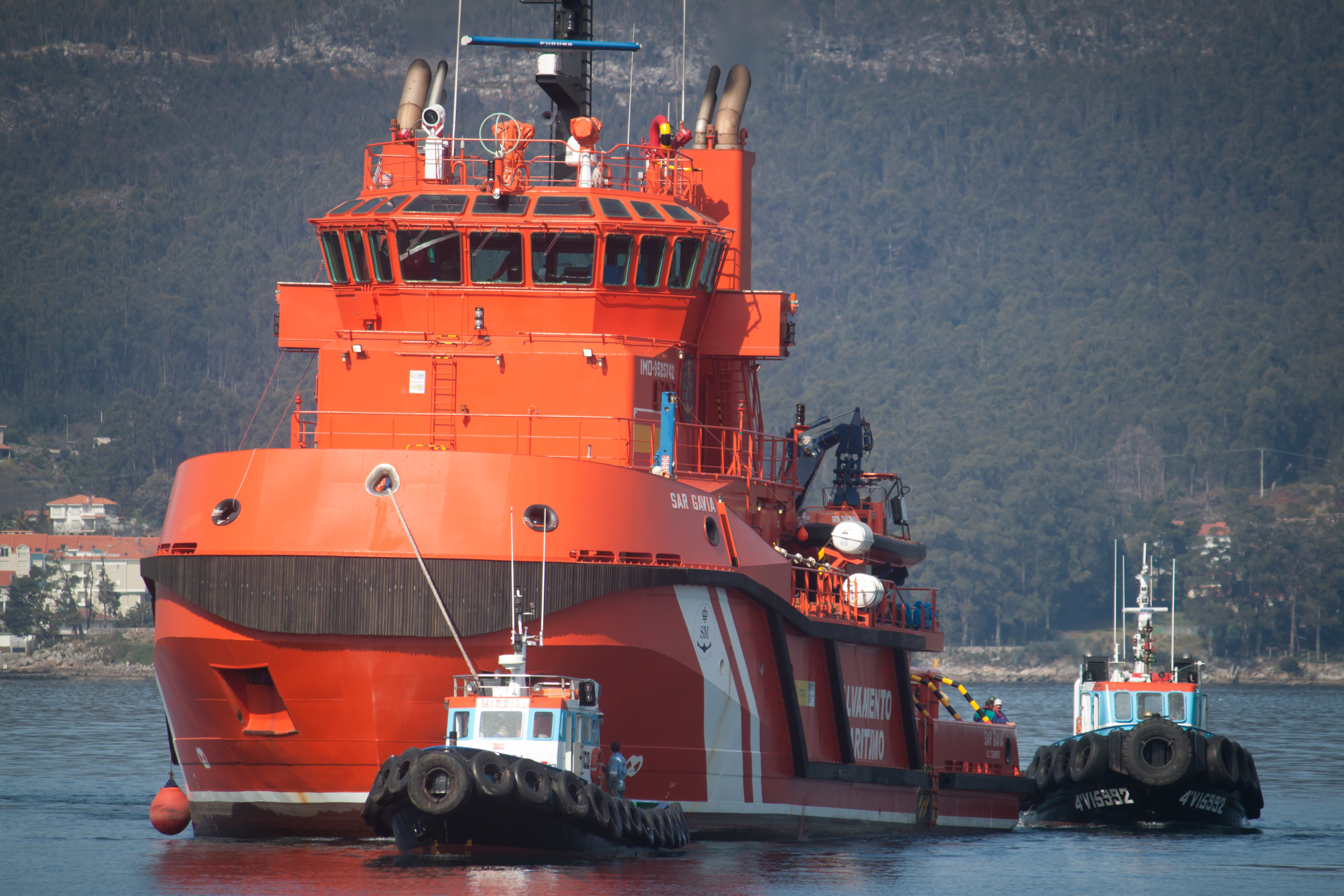
Tugs working.

It has a 18,000 m2 logistic capability, which allows storage of up to 3,000 tons of material. The shipyard can carry, cut and shape materials such as steel and aluminum alloys in different quality grades, thicknesses and sizes, for later assembly at the client projects or delivering the final product.

Finally, the company makes engineering developments for chemical, mining, gas and oil, shipbuilding, aeronautical, wind and railway sectors. Also for granite industry, wood or for different areas such as art, where the shipyard has actively collaborated with the Madrilenian sculptor Carlos Albert.

== Ships built at Nodosa Shipyard (selection) ==
Below are the most relevant constructions carried out by Nodosa.

Tugs and maritime assistance vessels
Ship Class	Name	Build number	Overall length	Breadth	Draught	Power rating	G.T.	Bollard Pull
Tug	Ría de Pontevedra	233	23,50	7,70	3,80	2 CAT 3508 I-DI, 1100 HP	133,40	28 t (28 long tons; 31 short tons)
Tug	Puerto de Marín	258	26,50	8,50	4,60	3345,6 BHP a 1600 rpm	242,3	45 t (44 long tons; 50 short tons)
Tug	Faro de Tambo	273	27,40	9,00	4,60	2 CAT 3512 HD, 1998 HP	242,3	55 t (54 long tons; 61 short tons)
Tug	Josita C.	275	16,00	5,50	2,80	2 x CAT C-12, 390 HP c/u	38,50	1,550 t (1,530 long tons; 1,710 short tons)

Dredges and port workboats
Ship Class	Name	Build number	Overall length	Breadth	Draught	Power rating	G.T.	Hopper capacity
Split hopper barge	Ecológico Primero	270	55,00	12,00	4,50	2x720 HP A 1800 rpm	845,00	900 m^{3}
Split hopper barge	Ecológico Segundo	271	55,00	12,00	4,50	2x720 HP A 1800 rpm	845,00	900 m^{3}
Split hopper dredge	Omvac Diez	276	72,70	12,90	4,50	2x1000 HP A 1800 rpm	1138,00	1200 m^{3}
Split hopper dredge	Moustakbal II	278	77,70	14,00	4,80	2x1900 HP @ 1500 rpm	1573,00	1800 m^{3}
Split hopper barge	Omvac Doce	280	61,38	12,50	4,50	2x862 CV @ 1800 rpm	1121,00	1040 m^{3}

Trawlers
Ship class	Name	Build number	Overall length	Breadth	Draught	Power rating	G.T.
Trawler	Mar de Mares	246	38,00	8,40	3,70	1380 BHP a 900 rpm	409,10
Trawler	Río Caxil	257	50,50	10,00	4,05	1000 BHP a 900 rpm	868,00
Trawler	Cantábrico Tres	264	35,00	8,00	3,60	500 BHP a 900 rpm	352,00

Longliners
Ship class	Name	Build number	Overall length	Breadth	Draught	Power rating	G.T.
Longliner	Punta Candieira	265	32,00	8,00	3,65	500 HP a 1800 rpm	292
Longliner	Mariané	267	39,80	8,00	3,70	480 HP a 700 rpm	438

Purse seiners
Ship class	Name	Build number	Overall length	Breadth	Draught	Power rating	G.T.
Purse seiner	Porto de Aguiño	195	24,00	6,20	2,65	720 HP a 1400 rpm	82,96
Purse seiner	Mi Nombre Cinco	261	24,00	6,20	2,65	540 BHP a 1800 rpm	87,1

Aquaculture and tuna trap-net workboats
Ship class	Name	Build number	Overall length	Breadth	Draught	Power rating	G.T.
Aquaculture workboat	Algazul Uno	269	21,20	6,60	2,40	600 HP a 1800 rpm	56,00
Aquaculture workboat	Cobecho Tres	274	22,00	7,00	2,40	595 HP a 1800 rpm	67,60

== See also ==
- List of shipbuilders and shipyards
- Shipbuilding
- Ship repair
