= List of yachts built by Alloy Yachts =

This is a list of all the yachts built by Alloy Yachts, sorted by year.

Was the longest yacht upon completion.

== Sailing yachts ==
Year	Length overall in meters	Name	Reference
1985	31.7	Lady M	
1990	31.9	Pacific Eagle	
1991	32.6	Eclipse	
1992	33.2	Sea Quell	
1993	33.6	Imagine B	
1994	35.11	Caroline I	
1995	36.19	Sovereign	
1995	37	Genevieve	
1996	31.95	Irelanda	
1998	30.94	Savannah	
1999	33.94	Blue Too	
2000	48.5	Georgia	
2000	40.4	Numberu Blau	
2001	39.75	Huckleberry	
2002	31.18	Chimera	
2002	40.9	Destination	
2002	53	Drumbeat	
2004	54.27	Tiara	
2004	32.97	Marae	
2005	39.75	Janice of Wyoming	
2006	51.7	Prana	
2008	51.7	Red Dragon	
2008	52	Mondango	
2010	44.18	Imagine D	
2010	58.4	Kokomo	
2011	67.2	Vertigo	
2013	43.9	Encore	
2014	56.4	Mondango 3	

== Motor yachts ==
Year	Length overall in meters	Name	Reference
1997	35.05	Fortune Elephant	
2003	38.6	Batai	
2005	40.25	Ad Lib	
2006	41	Gazelle	
2007	34.18	VvS1	
2009	40	Tat's	
2012	47	Loretta Anne	
2012	39.16	Caryali	
2014	44.1	Hey Jude	

== See also ==
- List of large sailing yachts
- List of motor yachts by length
- Luxury yacht
- Sailing yacht
