= Bill Langan =

Michael William Langan, (Bill Langan), (June 9, 1955 – December 31, 2010) was an American yacht designer who practiced his trade in New York City and Newport, Rhode Island. His designs, both as chief designer at Sparkman & Stephens and later as the principal at Langan Design, numbered in the hundreds.

== Career ==
Having obtained his engineering degree at Webb Institute he was accepted for an internship at Sparkman & Stephens. Noticed by Olin Stephens he was hired shortly after his graduation, named in 1980 by Olin as chief designer, a position he held until his departure in 1996.

In 1997 Bill set up his own Langan Design firm in Newport, RI which he ran until his death at the end of 2010, afterwards owned and operated by his former associates.

== Designs ==
Bill Langan was responsible for the design of hundreds of vessels of all sizes, including:

At Sparkman & Stephens

- Freedom, winner of the 1980 America's Cup
- America II
- Itasca, refit in 1994. Owned by Bill Simon, former Secretary of the Treasury of the U.S., Itasca was the first private yacht to complete the traverse of the Northwest Passage in a single season. Bill Langan was on board for the trip.
- Victoria of Strathearn, 91' ketch

At Langan Design

- Victoria of Strathearn, 130' ketch
- Sagamore, Line honors, Bermuda Race 2000
- Argo
- Spirit of Bermuda
- Eos
- M/Y Calliope
