= Ed Dubois =

English yacht designer (1952-2016)

Edward George Dubois
- Born: 18 April 1952; Surrey, U.K.
- Died: 24 March 2016 (aged 63)
- Education: Whitgift School; Southampton College of Technology
- Occupation: Yacht designer
- Known for: Dubois
- Spouse: Honor Sharpe
- Children: 4

Edward George Dubois (18 April 1952 – 24 March 2016) was a British yacht designer. He was the founder of Dubois Naval Architects and has been described as one of the foremost designers of sailing yachts.

== Early life ==
Ed Dubois was born on 18 April 1952 in Surrey, England. He was educated at the Whitgift School and he graduated from the Southampton College of Technology, now known as the University of Southampton.

== Career ==
Dubois started his career by working for naval architect Alan Buchanan in Jersey. He also worked for Gorey Yacht Services in Jersey, and he wrote for Yachts & Yachting. In 1976, he designed his first yacht for George Skelley, a Jersey-based restaurateur. She was called Borsalino Trois.

Dubois founded his own company, Dubois Naval Architects, in 1977. He designed Police Car for Peter Cantwell, who won the Admiral's Cup in 1979. In 1986 he designed his first superyacht, Aquel II. In 1987 he designed Esprit for Neville Crichton, who decided to retain the building team to found the Alloy Yachts shipyard. During his lifetime he designed 47 sailing yachts between 110 ft and 217 ft, including Kokomo, Timoneer II, Silvertip, Tiara, Zulu II and Mondango II.

Dubois was a fellow of the Royal Institution of Naval Architects and the Royal Academy of Engineering. He received an honorary doctorate from the Southampton Solent University in 2004. In 2007, the two-day regatta called the Dubois Cup was named after him.

According to The Daily Telegraph, he was "one of the world’s foremost yacht designers." He was also called "a legend in his own time" by Yachting.

== Personal life and death ==
With his wife Honor Sharpe, Dubois had two sons and two daughters. He owned a yacht, Firebrand, designed by Olin Stephens.

Dubois died of pancreatic cancer on 24 March 2016, at the age of 63.
