= Planet41 =

Planet41 Mobi-Venture Ltd.
- Type: Public
- Industry: Wireless, Telecommunications
- Founded: 13 September 2006
- Founder: Somil Gupta, Sangam Gupta
- Headquarters: Mumbai, India
- Area served: Worldwide
- Key people: Somil Gupta (Co-founder, CEO), Sangam Gupta (Co-founder), Kartikeya Watts (COO)
- Products: 3G products, Mobile entertainment products
- Services: Value-added services, SMS marketing, Mobile CMS, Content development, Content management
- Number of employees: 47 (2010)
- Website: Planet41.com

Planet41 Mobi-Venture Ltd. is an India-based mobile Value Added Services company, originally incorporated as "Planet 41 Entertainment Limited" in the year 2006. The company is headquartered in Mumbai, India. Planet41 is a Mobile content provider. It is also an applications provider for 2G as well as 3G mobiles. It is India's first ISO 9001:2008 company in mobile value-added services area.

== History ==
The company was originally incorporated as 'Planet 41 Entertainment Limited' under the Companies Act, 1956. The name of the company was later changed to its current name in the year 2008.

In June 2010, the company filed for initial public offer to raise Rs 50 crore to the market regulator SEBI.

Later in the same year, the company announce collaborations with RadiSys and Ethrix companies to deploy an integrated 3G mobile video services platform.

The co-founders of the company Somil Gupta and Sangam Gupta also hold the position of Managing Director and CEO of Trine Entertainment Limited, respectively.

== Products and services ==
The company deals in the following products and services:

– Content management platforms
– WAP content development and management
– On-device Portals
– Caller ring back tones
– SMS subscriptions
– Bulk SMS
– Video SMS
– Video ring back tones
– Video service Delivery Platform
– Mobile radio
– Mobile music
– Live TV
– Mobile video comics
– Mobile dating applications
– Video Blogs
– Video Mobile-Banking
– Video Mail
– Video Conferencing through mobile
– Mobile payment services
– IVVR Mobile banking
– Universal Memory Exchanger

== Partial list of clients ==
Some of well-known clients of Planet41 are:

- Mobile operators

– Aircel
– Airtel
– Etisalat
– Idea Cellular
– Loop Mobile
– Reliance Communications
– Tata Teleservices
– Uninor
– Vodafone

- Content Aggregators

– Big Music
– Comviva
– Phoneytunes
– Rediff.com
– Saregama
– Shemaroo Entertainment
– Star TV
– Times Music
– Venus Records and Tapes

- Enterprise solutions

– Bharti Walmart
– Big Bazaar
– NDTV
– Pawan Hans Helicopters
– SBI Life Insurance
