= Darktrace =

British cyber security company

Darktrace Holdings Ltd
- Formerly: Darktrace Ltd (2013 - 2021)
- Company type: Private
- Traded as: LSE: DARK
- Founded: 2013; 13 years ago
- Headquarters: Cambridge, United Kingdom
- Key people: Gordon Hurst (Chairman); Ed Jennings (CEO)
- Services: Cybersecurity
- Revenue: ▲US$545.4 million (2023)
- Operating income: ▲US$36.5 million (2023)
- Net income: ▲US$59.0 million (2023)
- Total assets: ▲US$751.9 million (2023)
- Total equity: ▼US$263.5 million (2023)
- Owner: Thoma Bravo (2024–)
- Number of employees: 2,269 (2023)
- Website: darktrace.com

Darktrace Holdings Ltd is a British cyber security company, established in 2013 and headquartered in Cambridge, United Kingdom with further global office locations in London, San Francisco, and Singapore. It was listed on the London Stock Exchange until it was acquired by American private equity firm Thoma Bravo in October 2024.

== History ==
=== Origins ===
Darktrace was founded in 2013 in Cambridge, where the Darktrace AI Research Centre is based, with the company's second R&D centre located in The Hague, Netherlands. It was founded by mathematicians and cyber defence experts at Invoke Capital, a company owned by Mike Lynch.

Many of Darktrace's management personnel, including former chief executive Poppy Gustafsson, chief technology officer Jack Stockdale, and chief strategy and artificial intelligence officer Nicole Eagan, were recruited from Autonomy.

=== Listing ===
In April 2021, Darktrace listed on the London Stock Exchange with a market value of circa £2.5 billion. The market value reached a peak of £7 billion within months, with a share value peak of £10, but later fluctuated. On 6 March 2022, Darktrace opened with a share value of £6.46, with a market cap of £3.43 billion.

In March 2022, Darktrace acquired Cybersprint, a Dutch attack surface management company, for €47.5 million.

Poppy Gustafsson stepped down as chief executive officer (CEO) in September 2024. She was succeeded by former chief operating officer (COO) Jill Popelka, who has also been appointed to the Darktrace Board of Directors.

At the beginning of 2025, the company announced that it had acquired Cado Security, a firm specializing in investigations in the context of cyberattacks.

=== Short seller report ===
On 31 January 2023, Quintessential Capital Management, a New York-based hedge fund and short seller, published a detailed report alleging potential accounting errors at Darktrace, making claims about potential irregularities in contracts with resellers and customers, predominantly dating from before Darktrace's public listing in 2021. Darktrace has disputed this. Quintessential pointed towards connections between Darktrace and HP Autonomy, the UK software company with which Darktrace shares many ties. Autonomy was accused of irregular accounting practices relating to its $11.7bn sale to Hewlett-Packard in 2011.

The company's share price fell 12 per cent when Quintessential first disclosed its short position on 30 January 2023. The shares then fell a further 8 per cent the following day, after the report was published, down to 200p.

On 18 July 2023, EY concluded its review into the company's contracts and internal financial processes. EY found a “small number of errors and inconsistencies” with some of the contracts but nothing that would be “material” to Darktrace's financial statements.

=== Takeover ===
In April 2024, the private equity business, Thoma Bravo, offered to acquire the company for $5.3 billion. The takeover was approved by the UK Court in September 2024, allowing the transaction to complete. On 1 October 2024, it was announced that Thoma Bravo had formally completed its acquisition of the firm.

In January 2026, Jill Popelka was replaced as CEO after just 16 months in the role. In March 2026, Ed Jennings assumed the role of chief executive of the company.

== Products ==
Darktrace's product uses unsupervised machine learning techniques to build an intrinsic "pattern of life" for every network, device, and user within an organisation. From this evolving understanding of 'normal', it can then detect potential threats as they emerge in real time. It employs an autonomous response technology, Antigena, to take action against in-progress cyber-attacks. The product also visualises network activity on a user interface, called the 'Threat Visualiser'.

Darktrace has claimed that it has the capability to defend against zero-day attacks, for example during the log4j vulnerability exploits.

In the wake of the pandemic, Darktrace reported rising demand for its technology as sophisticated cyber attacks surged.

== Sponsorship ==
Darktrace signed a partnership deal with McLaren Racing in 2020. In 2021, the deal was extended to include McLaren's IndyCar team.
