= Comparison of large sloops =

This article lists the largest active privately owned single-masted monohulls in excess of 130ft (39.6m) in overall sparred length.

== Parameter list ==
Name: currently registered identification of the vessel
Year: year of launch of the vessel
Shipyard: signatory of the build contract responsible for the final fitout and the delivery of the vessel
Designer: naval architect responsible for drawing the lines plan and the sail plan of the vessel
LOA: overall sparred length in metres
LWL: load waterline length in metres
Beam: width of the vessel in metres
Draught: draught of the vessel in metres (minimum draft of lifting keels in parentheses)
Air draught: masthead height in metres
Sail Area: summed upwind surface area of mainsail and headsails in square metres
Displacement: displaced volume of water, upright, at rest, in metric tonnes
Hull material: build material of the hull
Propulsion: number of engines and their power in kilowatts

== Fleet in navigation ==
Name	Year	Shipyard	Designer	LOA	LWL	Beam	Draught	Air draught	Sail area	Displacement	Hull material	Propulsion
M5	2004	(England) VT Group	Ron Holland	77.60m	63.50m	14.82m	10.20m (4.00m)	88.50m	2,385m²	765t	foam/vinylester	2 x 969 kW
Anatta	2011	(Netherlands) Vitters Shipyard	Edward George Dubois	66.00m		10.30m	9.00m (4.90m)	83.00m	2,370m²	494t	aluminium	2 x 532 kW
Sarissa II	2023	(Netherlands) Royal Huisman	Malcolm McKeon	59.70m		11.50m					aluminium	
Perseus 3	2014	(Italy) Perini Navi	Ron Holland	58.60m	50.43m	11.40m	12.30m (4.30m)	75.80m	1,514m²	575t	aluminium	2 x 720 kW
Kokomo III	2010	(New Zealand) Alloy Yachts	Edward George Dubois	58.40m	52.15m	10.90m	8.10m (4.95m)	75.00m	1,914m²	598t	aluminium	2 x 650 kW
Ngoni V	2017	(Netherlands) Royal Huisman	Edward George Dubois	58.00m	51.20m	9.54m	8.10m (5.30m)	71.00m	1,540m²	397t	aluminium	1 x 720 kW
Alea	2022	(Netherlands) Vitters Shipyard	Germán Frers, Mani Frers	56.00m		11.35m	6.60m (3.50m)	55.32m	1,166m²		aluminium	
Bayesian	2008	(Italy) Perini Navi	Ron Holland	56.00m	46.70m	11.51m	9.70m (3.95m)	72.00m		543t	aluminium	2 x 720 kW
Tiara	2004	(New Zealand) Alloy Yachts	Edward George Dubois	54.30m	44.60m	11.00m	8.00m (5.20m)	63.00m		468t	aluminium	1 x 1,044 kW
Pink Gin VI	2017	(Finland) Baltic Yachts	Judel/Vrolijk	53.90m	45.12m	9.55m	7.00m (4.50m)	67.90m	1,322m²	250t	carbonfiber	1 x 1,044 kW
Anne	2009	(Netherlands) Vitters Shipyard	André Hoek	52.50m	36.80m	9.50m	4.60m	58.60m	1,575m²	305t	aluminium	1 x 820 kW
Favourite Child	2006	(New Zealand) Alloy Yachts	Edward George Dubois	51.70m	44.80m	10.32m	4.88m	63.40m		395t	aluminium	1 x 895 kW
Red Dragon II	2008	(New Zealand) Alloy Yachts	Edward George Dubois	51.77m	45.70m	10.32m	5.04m	64.00m	1,423m²	437t	aluminium	1 x 1,044 kW
Better Place	2012	(Italy) Wally Yachts	William Henry Tripp III	49.90m	44.80m	10.25m	6.20m (4.20m)	67.50m	1,100m²	240t	carbonfiber	1 x 283 kW
All about u	2018	(Turkey) Ada Yacht Works	Jaron Ginton	49.90m		10.44m	3.65m				steel	2 x 588 kW
All about u 2	2019	(Turkey) Ada Yacht Works	Jaron Ginton	49.90m		10.44m	3.65m				steel	2 x 588 kW
Ohana II	2012	(New Zealand) Fitzroy Yachts	Edward George Dubois	49.70m	44.60m	9.96m	5.50m	63.00m		370t	aluminium	1 x 1,081 kW
Zefira	2011	(New Zealand) Fitzroy Yachts	Edward George Dubois	49.70m	44.60m	9.95m	4.90m	60.50m		370t	aluminium	1 x 1,081 kW
Georgia	2000	(New Zealand) Alloy Yachts	Paolo Scanu	48.50m	41.00m	10.10m	7.50m (3.80m)	61.00m		350t	aluminium	1 x 746 kW
Nativa	2012	(Italy) Arzanà Navi	William Henry Tripp III	48.40m		9.56m	7.50m (4.50m)	63.72m	1,072m²	297t	aluminium	1 x 588 kW
Dwinger	2008	(Netherlands) Royal Huisman	Ted Hood, Dykstra Naval Architects	48.20m	39.70m	10.20m	7.22m (2.95m)	58.20m	785m²	350t	aluminium	1 x 522 kW
Wisp	2014	(Netherlands) Royal Huisman	André Hoek	47.70m	33.20m	9.50m	4.50m	57.50m	1,104m²	235t	aluminium	1 x 533 kW
MitseaAH II	2004	(England) Pendennis	David Pedrick	47.50m	43.20m	10.30m	7.41m (2.30m)	47.50m		268t	aluminium	2 x 2,610 kW
Hyperion	1998	(Netherlands) Royal Huisman	Germán Frers	47.42m	38.80m	9.56m	7.32m (4.80m)	59.00m		285t	aluminium	1 x 809 kW
Nilaya II	2023	(Netherlands) Royal Huisman	Reichel/Pugh	46.80m		10.00m	6.90m (4.50m)				aluminium	
Lulworth	1920	(England) White Brothers	Herbert William White	46.30m	28.64m	6.60m	5.50m	52.00m	828m²	188t	steel/wood	1 x 283 kW
Scorpione	2006	(Finland) Baltic Yachts	Judel/Vrolijk	46.20m	36.30m	8.45m	6.10m (3.75m)	48.80m		180t	carbonfiber	1 x 635 kW
Wellenreiter	2005	(Netherlands) Jongert	André Hoek	46.10m	34.00m	8.90m	6.70m (3.80m)	53.00m	1,130m²	254t	steel	1 x 499 kW
Skade	2016	(Netherlands) Holland Jachtbouw	William Henry Tripp III	46.10m	42.10m	9.32m	6.50m (4.50m)	62.00m	1,130m²	235t	aluminium	
Ganesha II	2013	(Netherlands) Vitters Shipyard	Edward George Dubois	46.00m	40.60m	9.00m	6.50m (4.50m)	62.90m	1,074m²	234t	aluminium	1 x 533 kW
Unfurled II	2015	(Netherlands) Vitters Shipyard	Germán Frers	46.00m	43.36m	9.80m	6.50m (5.04m)	64.00m		263t	aluminium	
Heritage II	2006	(Italy) Perini Navi	Ron Holland	45.30m	36.70m	9.71m	8.71m (3.86m)	52.40m		353t	steel	1 x 1,044 kW
Helios	2007	(Italy) Perini Navi	Ron Holland	45.30m	36.70m	9.73m	8.75m (3.90m)	52.40m	1,191m²	358t	steel	1 x 720 kW
Fivea	2010	(Italy) Perini Navi	Ron Holland	45.30m	36.30m	9.73m	8.75m (3.90m)	52.40m	1,191m²	358t	steel	2 x 425 kW
Clan VIII	2011	(Italy) Perini Navi	Ron Holland	45.30m	36.30m	9.73m	8.75m (3.90m)	52.40m	1,191m²	358t	steel	1 x 820 kW
Saudade IX	2008	(Italy) Wally Yachts	William Henry Tripp III	45.20m	38.80m	8.57m	6.20m (4.20m)	59.50m	920m²	150t	carbonfiber	1 x 447 kW
Palmira	2009	(New Zealand) Fitzroy Yachts	Edward George Dubois	45.00m	40.00m	9.34m	7.00m (4.75m)	61.00m		270t	aluminium	1 x 652 kW
Heureka	2014	(Netherlands) Holland Jachtbouw	William Dixon	45.00m	39.57m	9.00m	5.90m (3.90m)			196t	aluminium	
Visione	2002	(Finland) Baltic Yachts	Reichel/Pugh	44.80m	37.20m	8.28m	6.80m (4.10m)	54.60m		105t	carbonfiber	1 x 522 kW
Ningaloo	2010	(Netherlands) Vitters Shipyard	Edward George Dubois	44.70m	40.20m	9.04m	6.10m (4.10m)	54.70m	1,011m²	240t	aluminium	1 x 553 kW
Path III	2021	(Finland) Baltic Yachts	Judel/Vrolijk	44.60m	41.80m	9.45m	5.90m (3.40m)			172t	carbonfiber	1 x 405 kW
Kauris IV	2020	(Italy) Persico Marine	Germán Frers	44.20m		9.50m	7.20m (4.50m)	67.00m	1,038m²	171t	carbonfiber	2 x 478 kW
Imagine D	2010	(New Zealand) Alloy Yacht	Edward George Dubois	44.10m	38.50m	9.38m	6.00m (4.30m)	58.50m		260t	aluminium	1 x 651 kW
Artemis	2007	(New Zealand) Fitzroy Yachts	Edward George Dubois	44.00m	39.00m	9.34m	7.00m (4.75m)	60.00m		222t	aluminium	1 x 651 kW
Encore	2013	(New Zealand) Alloy Yacht	Edward George Dubois	43.90m	37.30m	9.37m	4.3m	54.00m	1,011m²	265t	aluminium	1 x 651 kW
Esense	2006	(Italy) Wally Yachts	William Henry Tripp III	43.70m	38.10m	8.57m	6.00m (4.00m)	57.20m	900m²	140t	carbonfiber	1 x 410 kW
Syl	2003	(Spain) Barcos Deportivos	Germán Frers	43.70m	37.80m	9.07m	6.00m (2.00m)	56.00m		221t	aluminium	1 x 550 kW
Svea	2017	(Netherlands) Bloemsma/Vitters	Tore Holm, André Hoek	43.60m	27.60m	6.40m	4.60m	53.75m	704m²	182t	aluminium	1 x 313 kW
Sea Eagle	2015	(Netherlands) Royal Huisman	Germán Frers	43.40m	37.90m	8.98m	4.50m	53.30m	965m²	203t	aluminium	1 x 533 kW
Canova II	2019	(Finland) Baltic Yachts	Bruce Farr	43.30m	41.60m	9.00m	6.50m (3.80m)			140t	carbonfiber	
Lionheart	2010	(Netherlands) Claasen Jachtbouw	Olin Stephens, Starling Burgess, André Hoek	43.30m	26.50m	6.55m	4.60m	52.50m		175t	aluminium	1 x 313 kW
Blue Papillon	2013	(Netherlands) Royal Huisman	Germán Frers	43.30m	37.90m	8.98m	4.50m	53.30m	965m²	203t	aluminium	1 x 533 kW
Mystere	2006	(Netherlands) Vitters Shipyard	William Henry Tripp III	43.20m	38.50m	8.80m	5.80m (3.50m)	54.50m		190t	aluminium	1 x 610 kW
Cavallo	2003	(Finland) Baltic Yachts	Judel/Vrolijk	42.90m	35.70m	8.34m	5.85m (3.50m)	49.00m	1,006m²	165t	carbonfiber	1 x 746 kW
Espiritu del Xarey	2002	(Netherlands) Vitters Shipyard	Edward George Dubois	42.90m	35.20m	8.87m	4.80m			191t	aluminium	1 x 377 kW
Bella ragazza	2004	(Netherlands) Vitters Shipyard	Edward George Dubois	42.90m	35.20m	8.80m	4.20m			220t	aluminium	1 x 610 kW
Koo	2002	(Netherlands) Vitters Shipyard	Edward George Dubois	42.90m	35.00m	9.00m	4.00m			215t	aluminium	1 x 610 kW
Delusha	1999	(Netherlands) Vitters Shipyard	André Hoek	42.70m	35.80m	9.26m	4.30m			275t	aluminium	1 x 701 kW
Topaz	2015	(Netherlands) Holland Jachtbouw	Frank Cabot Paine, André Hoek	42.60m	27.80m	6.85m	4.50m	54.00m		175t	aluminium	
Sharlou	2011	(Netherlands) Vitters Shipyard	William Henry Tripp III	42.60m	38.80m	8.20m	6.20m (4.00m)	56.00m		140t	carbonfiber	1 x 365 kW
Skorpios II	2021	(Finland) Nautor's Swan	Juan Kouyoumdjian	42.56m	36.70m	8.75m	7.40m	51.70m	1,010m²	64t	carbonfiber	1 x 373 kW
Vijonara V	2018	(United Kingdom) Pendennis	André Hoek	42.25m	28.00m	7.72m	4.50m		945m²	150t	aluminium	1 x 358 kW
Evolution	2019	(Turkey) Perini Navi	Reichel/Pugh	42.20m	40.70m	9.70m	5.90m (3.80m)	56.50m		250t	aluminium	1 x 292 kW
Hanuman	2009	(Netherlands) Royal Huisman	Charles E. Nicholson, Dykstra & Partners	42.10m	27.70m	6.60m	4.70m	48.20m		183t	aluminium	1 x 261 kW
L’Aquila II	2021	(Turkey) Mengi Yay	Jaron Ginton	41.87m		9.08m	4.00m				steel	2 x 679 kW
Ranger	2003	(Denmark) Danish Yacht	Olin Stephens, Starling Burgess, Fred Elliot	41.60m	28.50m	6.40m	4.80m			210t	steel	1 x 317 kW
Mirabella III	1994	(Thailand) Concorde Yacht	Bruce Farr	41.50m	36.40m	9.00m	3.90m				GRP	1 x 410 kW
Cambria	1928	(Scotland) William Fife & Sons	William Fife III	41.20m	22.86m	6.28m	4.20m	47.00m		131t	steel	1 x 224 kW
Allure	1994	(South Africa) Sterling Yachts	Angelo Lavranos	41.00m	32.60m	8.93m	5.96m (2.50m)			167t	aluminium	2 x 298 kW
Inmocean	2008	(New Zealand) Fitzroy Yachts	Edward George Dubois	41.00m	30.00m	8.35m	4.30m			165t	aluminium	1 x 447 kW
Destination	2002	(New Zealand) Alloy Yacht	Edward George Dubois	40.90m	34.00m	8.70m	4.50m			205t	aluminium	1 x 588 kW
Valquest	2009	(Netherlands) Bloemsma & Van Breemen	Edward George Dubois	40.80m	35.30m	8.90m	4.20m			190t	aluminium	1 x 559 kW
Zalmon	2000	(New Zealand) Alloy Yacht	Edward George Dubois	40.40m	33.50m	8.70m	4.10m		653m²	195t	aluminium	1 x 746 kW
Latitude	1991	(Thailand) Concorde Yacht	Bruce Farr	40.00m		9.00m	3.80m			225t	GRP	1 x 410 kW
Philanderer	1992	(Thailand) Concorde Yacht	Bruce Farr	40.00m	35.50m	9.00m	3.90m			198t	GRP	1 x 350 kW
State of Grace	2013	(Turkey) Perini Istanbul-Yıldız	Ron Holland	40.00m	34.10m	9.40m	9.10m (3.50m)	51.80m	1,191m²	220t	aluminium	1 x 500 kW
Extreme	2018	(Turkey) Mengi-Yay	Jaron Ginton	40.00m		9.20m	3.90m			286t	steel	2 x 500 kW
Aristarchos	2006	(Finland) Nautor's Swan	Germán Frers	39.99m	34.70m	8.51m	4.90m	53.70m	989m²	180t	GRP	1 x 365 kW
Black Sail	2009	(Italy) Wally Yachts	Javier Soto Acebal	39.95m	34.95m	7.90m	6.00m (4.50m)		774m²	110t	carbonfiber	1 x 335 kW
Rainbow	2012	(Netherlands) Holland Jachtbouw	Dykstra Naval Architects	39.95m	27.10m	6.37m	4.80m	52.30m		176t	aluminium	1 x 330 kW
Maria Cattiva	2003	(Netherlands) Royal Huisman	Bruce King	39.92m	28.90m	7.98m	3.80m	45.60m	719m²	180t	aluminium	1 x 477 kW
Alithia	2002	(Germany) Abeking & Rasmussen	William Henry Tripp III	39.78m	36.06m	8.38m	5.90m (4.10m)	48.80m	852m²	141t	aluminium	1 x 425 kW
Janice of Wyoming	2005	(New Zealand) Alloy Yacht	Edward George Dubois	39.75m	33.50m	8.74m	4.00m	50.30m		198t	aluminium	1 x 447 kW
Endeavour	1934	(England) Camper and Nicholson	Charles E. Nicholson	39.56m	26.87m	6.72m	4.80m		710m²	143t	steel	1 x 262 kW

== See also ==
- List of schooners
- List of large sailing yachts
