= Alex Bailin =

English barrister

Alex Bailin KC
- Born: 23 January 1969 (age 57)
- Education: University of Cambridge University of Sussex
- Occupation: Barrister

Alex Bailin KC (born 23 January 1969) is an English barrister specialising in criminal and international law, together with human rights and media law at Matrix Chambers. Bailin is also a legal writer for The Guardian, The Times and The Lawyer, among others.

== Education and career ==
Bailin read mathematics at Emmanuel College, Cambridge and law at Sussex University. He initially worked as a derivatives trader in the City of London. Bailin was called to the Bar (Lincoln's Inn) in November 1995 and took silk in 2010. Bailin practices in human rights, public and administrative law, public international law, criminal fraud, criminal law and media law.

Bailin is a Deputy High Court Judge in the Administrative Court and a Recorder at the Crown Court.

Bailin contributes legal articles to The Guardian, The Times, The Lawyer, the New Statesman and various legal journals.

== Cases ==
=== Criminal fraud and corporate crime ===
- R v Railtrack plc and its former Chief Executive (corporate manslaughter, Hatfield rail crash)
- R(Redknapp) v City of London Police 2009 1 WLR 2091 (corruption investigation in premiership football)
- R(Tchenguiz) v SFO (collapse of Kaupthing Bank)

=== Crime ===
- R v Katharine Gun (GCHQ employee – Official Secrets Act disclosures relating to the Iraq War)
- R v Dunlop (first double jeopardy application to quash a murder acquittal)

=== Extradition ===
- USA v Lauri Love (‘forum bar’)
- USA v Mike Lynch 2021–present (CEO of Autonomy plc)

=== Human rights ===
- R (C & GC) v Metropolitan Police [2011] 1 WLR 1230 (Supreme Court – retention of non-convicted persons' DNA)
- A and others v Home Secretary [2005] 2 AC 68 (House of Lords appeal in Belmarsh case – detention without trial of suspected terrorists)
- Da Silva v UK (European Court of Human Rights [GC], shooting of Jean Charles de Menezes)

=== Public law ===
- R(Gentle) v Prime Minister [2008] 1 AC 1356 (House of Lords appeal – legality of Iraq war and duty to hold a public inquiry)

=== Media law ===
- Gubarev v BuzzFeed (international defamation claims arising from Trump Dossier)
- Litvinenko Inquiry (representing UK print and broadcast media)
- David Miranda (Snowden material, journalistic protections)
- Advising The Guardian concerning the publication of WikiLeaks material

== Publications ==
- Fraud: Criminal Law & Procedure (Companies Act chapter)
- Human Rights & Criminal Justice (2nd ed., contributing author)
- Blackstone's Criminal Practice (Official Secrets Act chapter)
