= Kainos =

Northern Irish software company

Kainos Group plc

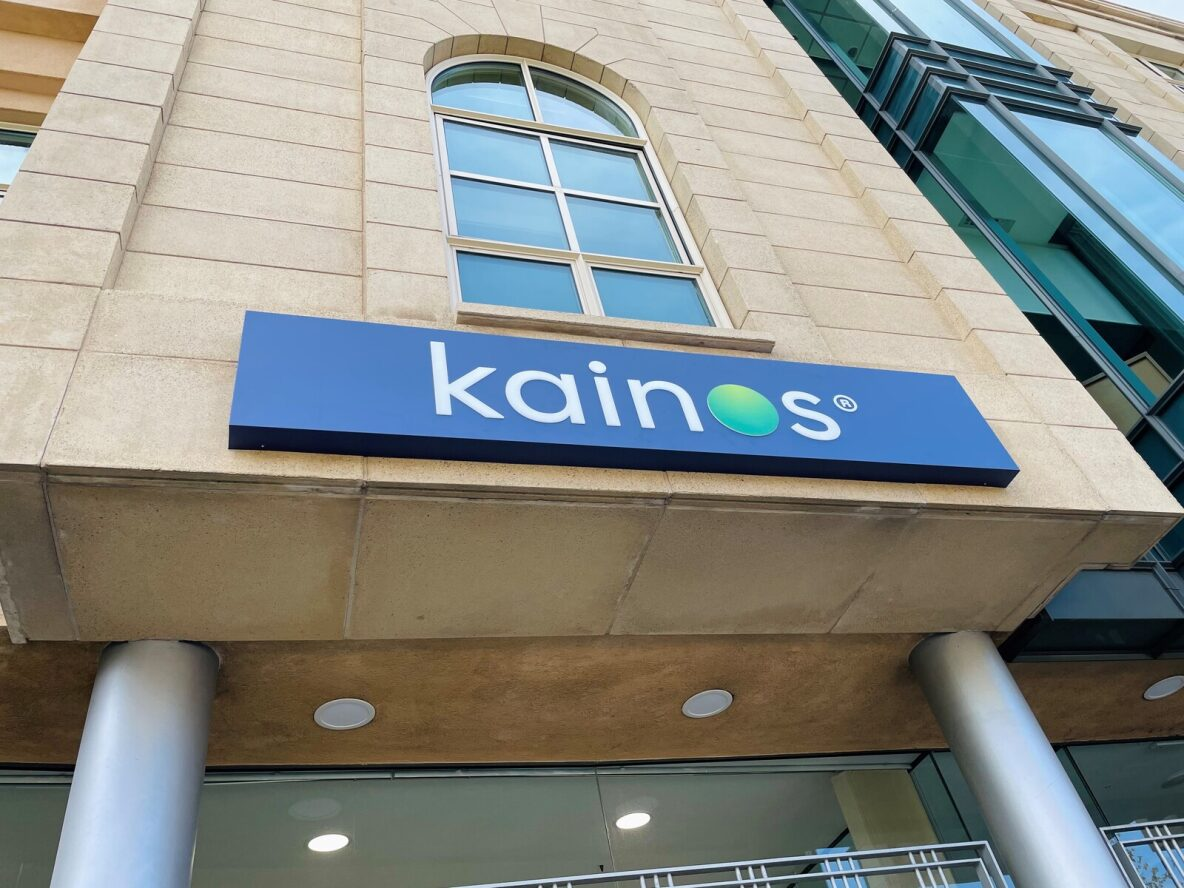
- Headquarters in Belfast, Northern Ireland.
- Type: Public
- Traded as: LSE: KNOS; FTSE 250 component
- Industry: Computer software IT services IT consulting
- Founded: Belfast, Northern Ireland (14 April 1986)
- Headquarters: Kainos, 4-6 Upper Crescent, Belfast, Northern Ireland, BT7 1NT
- Key people: Tom Burnet (chairman); Brendan Mooney (CEO)
- Revenue: ▲£431.1 million (2026)
- Operating income: ▲£54.8 million (2026)
- Net income: ▲£42.5 million (2026)
- Website: www.kainos.com

Kainos Group plc (commonly referred to simply as Kainos or Kainos Software) is a digital technology company headquartered in Belfast, Northern Ireland that develops information technology for businesses and organisations. It is listed on the London Stock Exchange and is a constituent of the FTSE 250 Index. The company has three divisions – Digital Services, Workday Services, and Workday Products.

== History ==
=== 1986 to 2009 ===
Kainos was founded as a joint venture between Fujitsu and The Queen's University of Belfast business incubation unit (QUBIS Ltd) on 14 April 1986. In January 1987, the company began trading in the QUBIS building on Malone Road, Belfast and Kainos founder, Frank Graham, was appointed managing director.

A spin-off company of Kainos was established in 1994 called Lagan Technologies, which grew to become a software supplier into local government in the UK and the US. It was eventually acquired by U.S.-based Kana Software in 2010.

By 1997, due to the expansion of the company, Kainos relocated and opened offices in Mount Charles, Belfast, and opened its main headquarters in Upper Crescent, Belfast.

Historical logo used by Kainos in the mid-2000s.

After several years of business, in which Fujitsu was its main customer, the company sold most of its stake to ACT Venture capital in 2000. ACT Venture capital later divested its shareholding in Kainos.

In September 2004, Kainos entered into a partnership agreement with Mediasurface, the UK's largest content management provider. The following year, Kainos entered into another partnership agreement in 2005 with TIBCO, a provider of infrastructure software.

In 2007, a wholly owned subsidiary of Kainos called SpeechStorm was established, providing automated products for call centres, including touch tone, SMS, speech and visual IVR. That same year, management in Kainos bought out Fujitsu's remaining 20% shares.

=== 2010 to present ===
Kainos expanded its operations and opened a research office in Silicon Valley on 18 October 2010.

On 19 November 2014, Kainos announced its plans to expand the Evolve Electronic Medical Records platform into Ireland.

On 10 July 2015, Kainos was admitted to the main market of the London Stock Exchange, trading as Kainos Group plc.

As part of an extension of its US operation, in June 2020, Kainos announced plans to create 133 jobs in Indianapolis. The plans included expenditure of £650,000 to build new facilities in the area, marking the first venture into the US Midwest.

Kainos bought a property on Dublin Road in Belfast in 2019 and received planning approval to build 250,000 ft^{2} of office space there. However, in light of the rapid expansion of flexible work during the Covid-19 pandemic, it sold 60% of that site, and committed instead to building 75,000 ft^{2} over 12 storeys, of which it would occupy four and lease out seven to third-party tenants via its subsidiary, Bankmore Investments. Completion was planned for 2027.

Kainos announced in March 2025 that it would lay off 190 of its 3,000 staff.

On 19 September 2025, Kainos announced that it was acquiring Davis Pier, a consulting firm based in Halifax, Nova Scotia, employing 120 people.

== Operations ==
Kainos has been a Workday implementation partner since 2011, providing management, integration, support and testing services for the Workday SaaS product.

Kainos is a leading provider of artificial intelligence services, delivering AI and data projects across public, healthcare, and commercial sectors. As the fifth-largest AI supplier to the UK public sector since 2018, Kainos has delivered more than £61 million in data and AI contracts and employs over 250 AI professionals.
