= Mike Lynch (businessman) =

British businessman (1965–2024)

Mike Lynch OBE DL FRS FREng
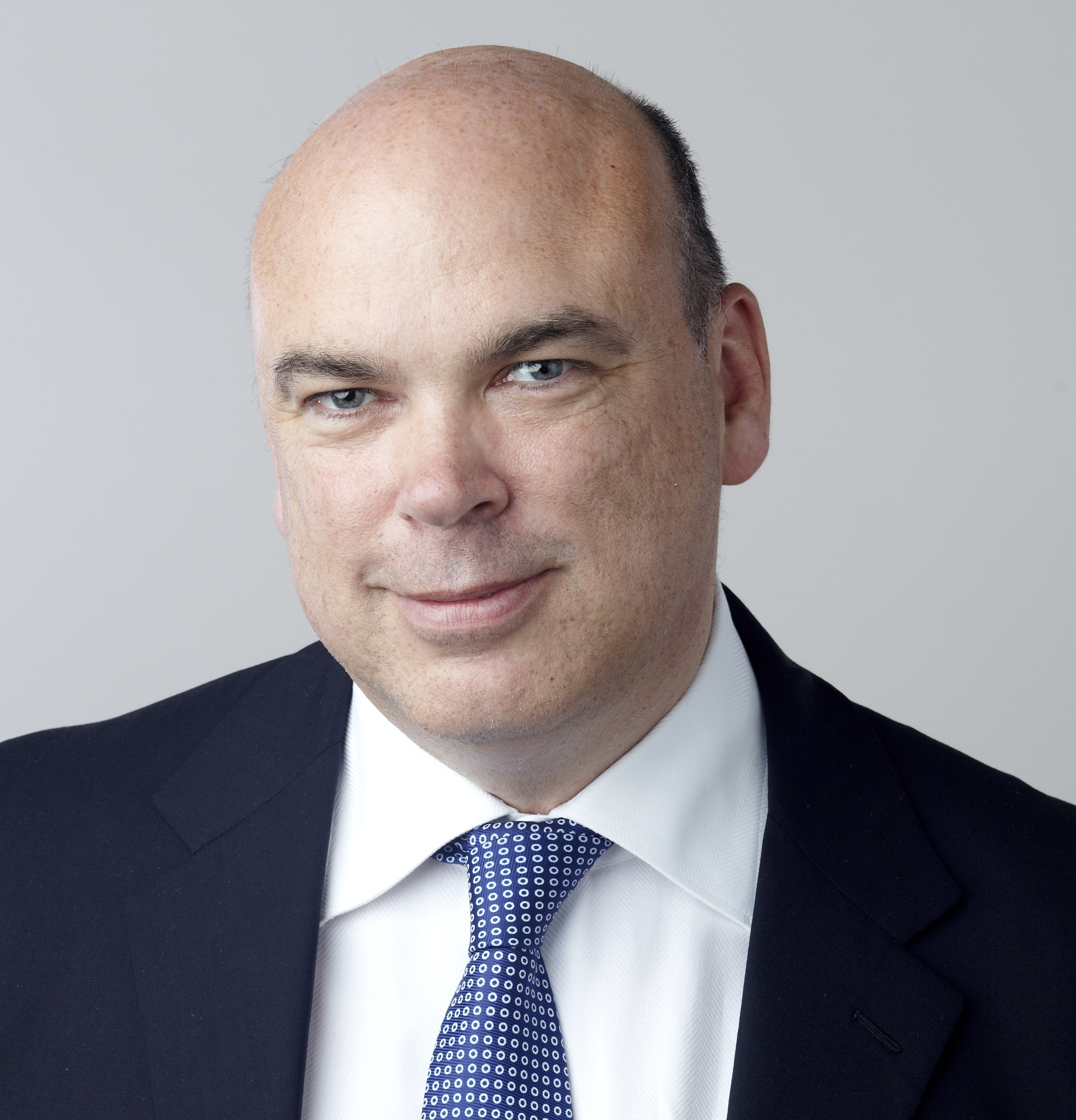
- Lynch in 2014
- Born: Michael Richard Lynch; 16 June 1965; Ilford, London, England
- Died: 19 August 2024 (aged 59); Mediterranean Sea, off Porticello, Sicily, Italy
- Education: Bancroft's School
- Alma mater: University of Cambridge (MA, PhD)
- Known for: Co-founding Autonomy Corporation
- Spouse: Angela Bacares
- Children: 2
- Scientific career
- Fields: Software engineering
- Thesis: Adaptive Techniques in Signal Processing and Connectionist Models (1990)
- Doctoral advisor: Peter Rayner

Michael Richard Lynch (16 June 1965 – 19 August 2024) was a British technology entrepreneur who co-founded Autonomy Corporation, Invoke Capital and Darktrace. He had various other roles, including in an advisory capacity.

Following an undergraduate degree, a PhD and postdoctoral research at the University of Cambridge, Lynch applied his research in machine learning to set up software companies and become a major figure in Silicon Fen. He was described in the press as the British equivalent of the American businessman Bill Gates, with an estimated worth of £852 million in 2023.

The sale of Autonomy to Hewlett-Packard in 2011 led to accusations of fraud and resulted in civil litigation in the UK in 2019. The case was decided largely in favour of Hewlett-Packard. In 2023, Lynch was extradited to the United States to face criminal charges. He went on trial in San Francisco in March 2024 and in June was found not guilty on all counts.

Lynch was celebrating his acquittal with a cruise on his family's superyacht, Bayesian, when it sank in a storm off the coast of Sicily on 19 August 2024. Lynch, his daughter and five others died.

== Early life and education ==
Lynch was born in Ilford, London Borough of Redbridge, on 16 June 1965 and grew up near Chelmsford in Essex. His mother was a nurse from County Tipperary and his father a firefighter from County Cork in Ireland.

Aged 11, he won a scholarship to study at Bancroft's School, a private school in Woodford, London. He was later the lead patron of the Bancroft's Foundation, which was established to provide means tested scholarships to able students regardless of family income. His first computer was a BBC Micro which he bought for £400, raising the money by doing odd jobs. From Bancroft's he went on to study the Natural Science Tripos at Christ's College at the University of Cambridge. After graduating he did postgraduate research in artificial neural networks and was awarded a PhD in 1990 for a thesis on signal processing, supervised by Peter Rayner. He subsequently undertook a research fellowship in adaptive pattern recognition.

== Career ==
Lynch set up his first company in the late 1980s, while he was studying for his PhD. Lynett Systems Ltd was financed with a £2,000 loan negotiated in a bar, and produced designs and audio products including synthesisers and a sampler for the Atari ST. In 1991, he founded Cambridge Neurodynamics, which specialised in computer-based fingerprint recognition. There were three corporate spin-offs from Cambridge Neurodynamics:

1. Neurascript, which searched business documents based on character recognition and was bought by the German company Dicom in 2004
2. NCorp, which searched databases
3. Autonomy Corporation, which searched unstructured sources including phone calls, emails and videos

=== Autonomy ===
In 1996, Lynch founded Autonomy, a search software company, with David Tabizel and Richard Gaunt. With Lynch as chief executive officer (CEO), Autonomy became one of the UK's top 100 public companies, and a leading company in Silicon Fen. Lynch was described in the press as the British equivalent of the American businessman Bill Gates. In October 2011, Hewlett-Packard bought Autonomy for more than $11 billion (£8.6 billion). Lynch made an estimated $800 million from the sale.

After the sale, Lynch founded a venture capital firm, Invoke Capital. One of the first companies backed by Invoke Capital was cybersecurity firm Darktrace. Invoke Capital became the biggest shareholder of Darktrace, with Lynch and his wife Angela Bacares being the second biggest, holding shares worth nearly £200 million. Many of the staff at Darktrace, including its CEO, had moved from Autonomy. Lynch was a member of the board until 2018 and continued as a member of the advisory council until 2021. He was a member of the Darktrace science and technology council until February 2023. As well as having to deal with questions about Lynch's involvement, Darktrace had to counter scepticism about its technology.

Other technology companies backed by Invoke Capital include Featurespace, which specialises in software to detect and prevent fraud and financial crime. Invoke Capital has invested in the legal technology firm Luminance, established in collaboration with Slaughter and May. Sophia Genetics, a Swiss medical data company, is also backed by Invoke Capital.

Lynch held a number of positions on boards and committees. When he was charged with fraud in the United States he resigned from his role as a government advisor on the Council for Science and Technology and from Royal Society committees. He had previously served as a board member of Cambridge Enterprise, Royal Botanic Gardens in Kew, the BBC, the British Library, Nesta, and the Francis Crick Institute.

=== Civil and criminal cases ===
In November 2012, Hewlett-Packard announced a US$8.8 billion (£5.5 billion) writedown of assets following their purchase of Autonomy due to "serious accounting improprieties, disclosure failures and outright misrepresentations" which occurred before the acquisition and artificially inflated the value of Autonomy. Lynch denied the allegations. The allegations were investigated by the UK Serious Fraud Office, who announced in January 2015 that it was ending its investigation with no action due to insufficient evidence in respect of some aspects of the allegations, while other aspects were ceded to the United States authorities. In November 2018, Lynch was indicted for fraud in the US along with Stephen Chamberlain, former vice president of finance at Autonomy. Earlier in 2018 Sushovan Hussain, Autonomy's former chief financial officer (CFO), had been found guilty of fraud in the US and sentenced to five years in prison.

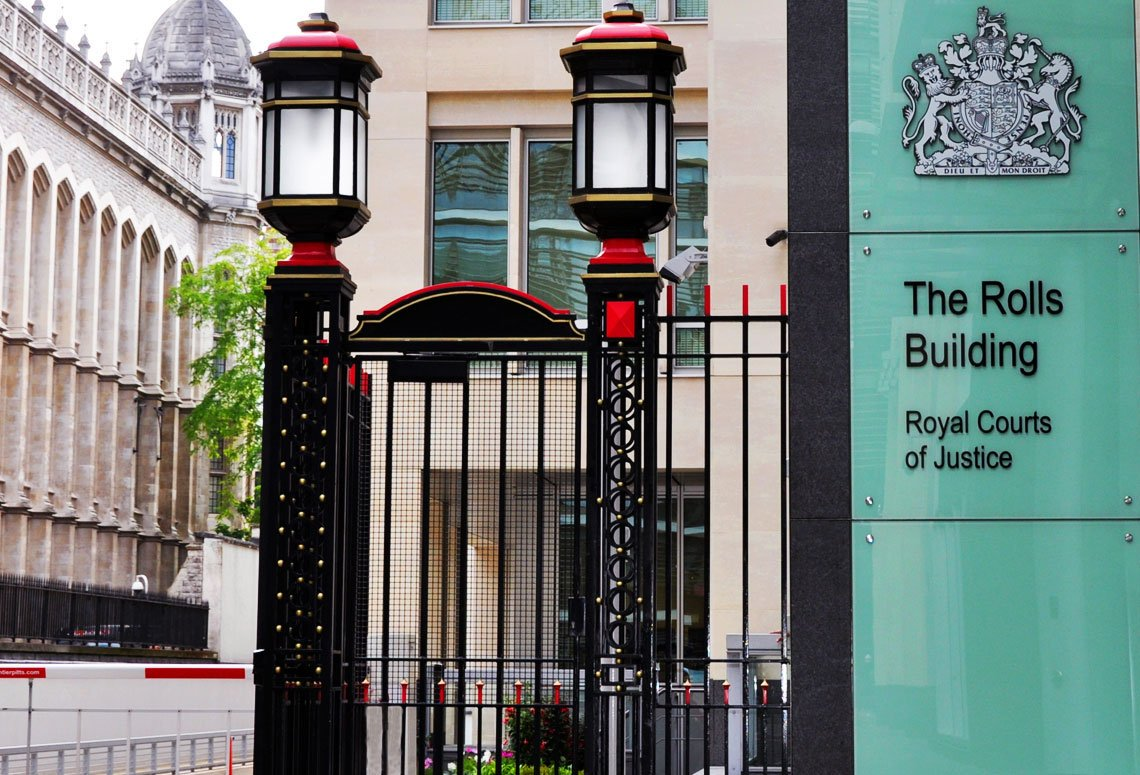
The civil case was heard at the Rolls Building, London.

In March 2019, Hewlett-Packard brought a civil action for fraud in the High Court in London. The action alleged that CFO Hussain and founder Lynch "artificially inflated Autonomy's reported revenues, revenue growth and gross margins". The case was heard by Mr Justice Hildyard sitting for 93 days over a period of nine months at the Rolls Building. The judge delivered his conclusions in January 2022, ruling that Hewlett-Packard had substantially succeeded in their claims. Damages were to be decided later, but the judge said they were likely to be considerably less than the $5 billion claimed by Hewlett Packard. In July 2025, Hildyard ruled that Hussain and the estate of Lynch owed Hewlett-Packard about £740 million, effectively bankrupting the estate. Hussain had settled with Hewlett-Packard in May 2025. In March 2026, a further ruling added interest to bring the total sum owed to about £930 million.

While the civil trial was taking place in London, the American authorities were seeking Lynch's extradition to face criminal charges of conspiracy and fraud in the United States. Through his lawyers, Lynch said he "vigorously rejects all the allegations". As a formality, he submitted himself for arrest in February 2020, and was released on bail of £10 million by Westminster Magistrates' Court. The case created a debate about the workings of the Anglo-American extradition treaty of 2003. Five former cabinet ministers signed a letter to The Times arguing against the extradition, and David Davis MP said in parliament that it was an attempt by the American authorities to "exercise extraterritorial jurisdiction".

In July 2021, a district judge ruled at Westminster Magistrates' Court that Lynch could be extradited to the US. Lynch applied for a judicial review; the application was rejected by High Court Judge Mr Justice Swift in January 2022 and Home Secretary Priti Patel approved his extradition. During the extradition proceedings Lynch was represented by Alex Bailin KC, who argued that Lynch should face trial in the UK. After a further appeal failed, Lynch was flown to the US in May 2023, and held under house arrest in San Francisco to await trial.

Lynch and Chamberlain went on trial in San Francisco on 18 March 2024. Lynch was charged with 16 counts of wire fraud, securities fraud and conspiracy, while Chamberlain faced 15 counts of wire fraud and conspiracy. Both pleaded not guilty. The court heard evidence and arguments over the course of 11 weeks, and one count of securities fraud was dropped. The jury retired for deliberation on 4 June. On 6 June 2024, Lynch and Chamberlain were found not guilty of all charges. Chamberlain died on 20 August 2024, three days after he was hit by a car while out jogging in Stretham.

=== Awards and honours ===
Lynch was appointed Order of the British Empire (OBE) for services to enterprise in the 2006 New Year Honours. In June 2008, he was elected a Fellow of the Royal Academy of Engineering (FREng). In 2011, he was named as the most influential person in UK IT by Computer Weekly. In 2014, Lynch was elected a Fellow of the Royal Society (FRS) and appointed a Deputy Lieutenant of the County of Suffolk. He was Lady Margaret Beaufort Honorary Fellow of Christ's College, Cambridge.

== Personal life ==
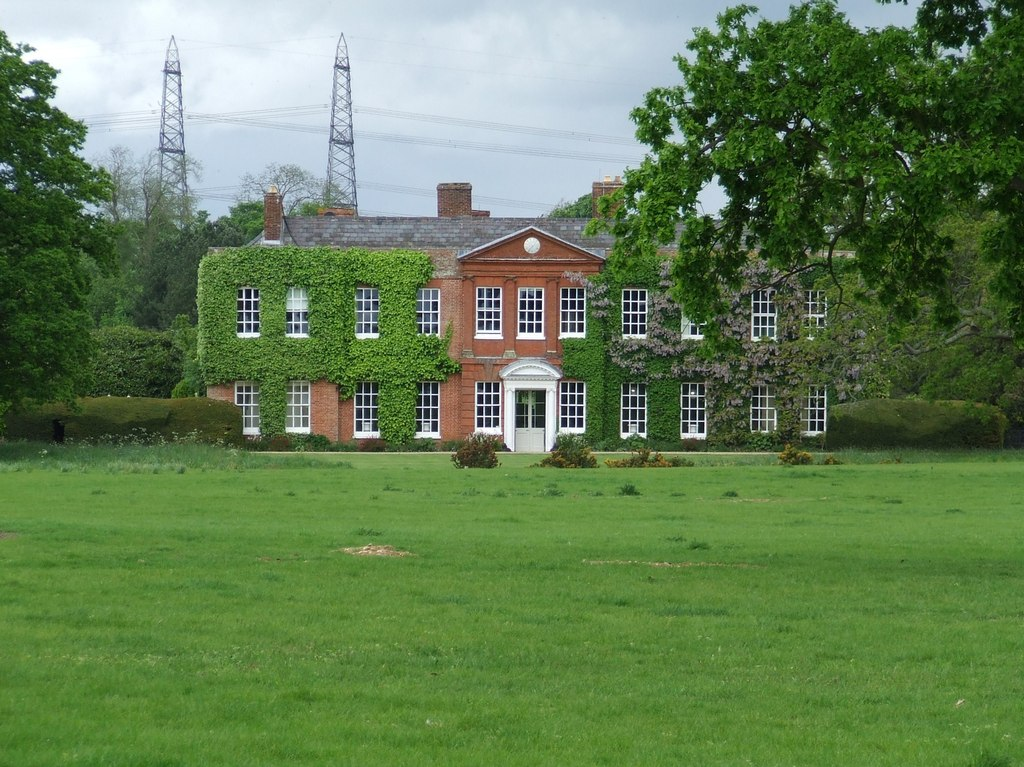
Loudham Hall in Pettistree in 2014

Lynch was married to Angela Bacares and they had two daughters. In 2023, the Sunday Times Rich List estimated the couple's net worth at £852 million. Lynch's entry in Who's Who lists his recreations as jazz saxophone and preserving rare breeds. He kept a herd of Red Poll cattle on his Loudham Hall estate at Pettistree, in East Suffolk.

== Death ==
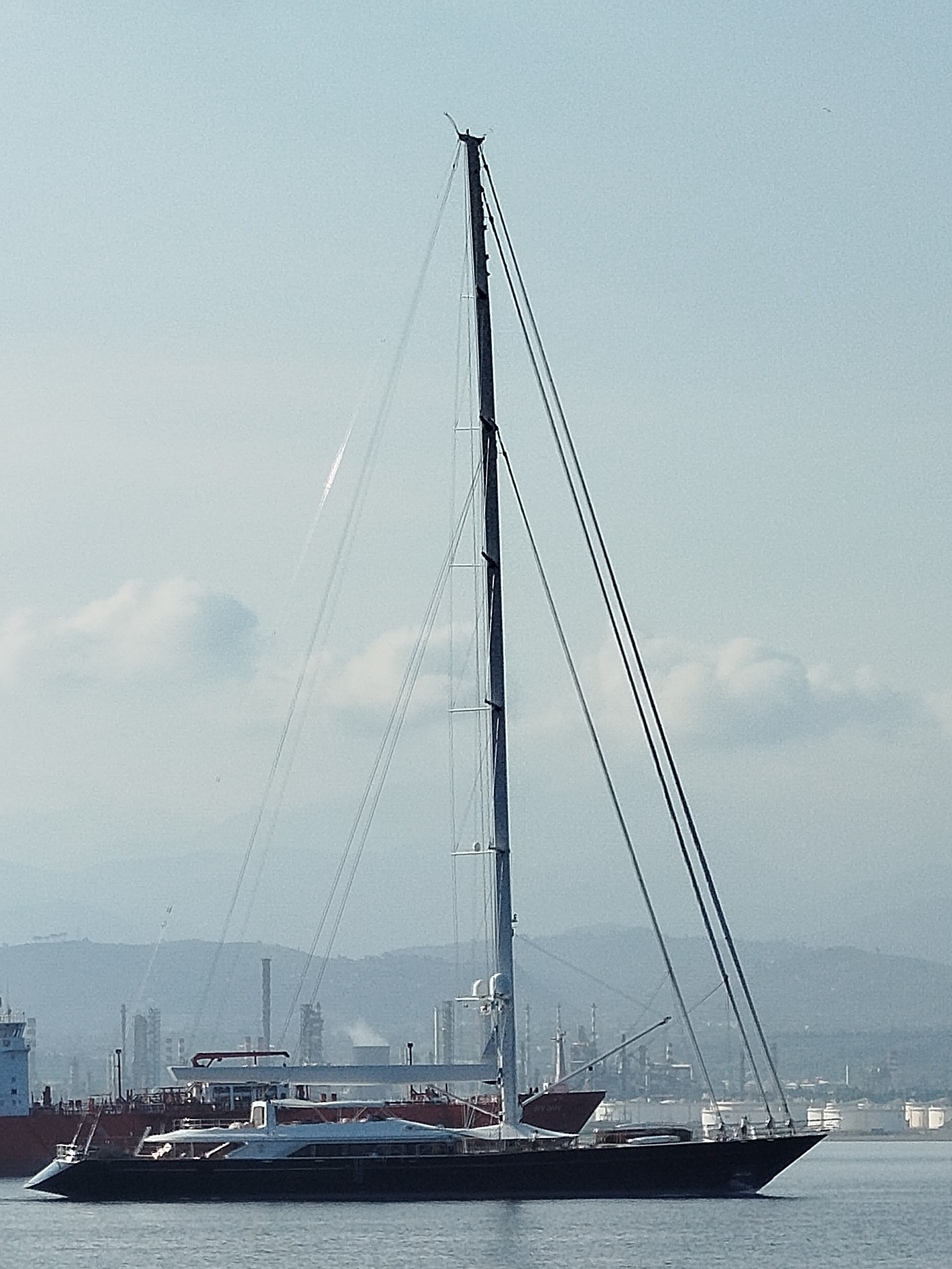
Bayesian superyacht at Milazzo, Sicily

In August 2024, Lynch celebrated his acquittal in the San Francisco trial with a cruise on the family superyacht, Bayesian. He was joined by his wife and daughter and nine invited guests, including two lawyers from his defense team. In the early hours of 19 August, the yacht sank off the coast of Sicily, outside the port of Porticello, during a powerful storm, with 22 people on board. Lynch, his teenage daughter Hannah, four guests, and one member of the crew died. Lynch's wife, Angela Bacares, was among the 15 persons who were rescued. Lynch's body was recovered by the Italian Coast Guard on 22 August. Italian authorities opened an investigation into the sinking.
