= WallyIsland =

WallyIsland (proposal)
History
- Builder: Wally Yachts
- Status: not built

General characteristics
- Type: Motor yacht
- Displacement: 2,730 tonnes
- Length: 99.05 m (325 ft 0 in) LOA; 99 m (324 ft 10 in) LWL
- Beam: 18 m (59 ft)
- Draft: 4.05 m (13.3 ft)
- Propulsion: 2 × 3,350 horsepower (2,500 kW) Azipods
- Speed: 17.5 knots (32.4 km/h; 20.1 mph) (max), 16 knots (30 km/h; 18 mph) (cruise)
- Range: 15,000 nmi (28,000 km; 17,000 mi)

WallyIsland was a 325-foot-long (99 m) steel motor yacht proposal published by Wally Yachts in 2007. She was intended to be one of the world's largest private yachts.

The defining feature of WallyIsland was her large main deck area. Measured at 1,000 square metres (11,000 sq ft), it was designed to maximize open space and allow a large garden to be built. The main deck and the three upper decks featured a large swimming pool, garden spaces, tennis or mini soccer field, a helipad, guest sleeping quarters, a master suite, main saloon, living/dining room, library, theater, spa, fitness area, as well as service and crew areas. The aft deck provided storage areas for tenders, and water toys. The vessel as designed to sleep 24 guests.
