= Sir Robert Baden Powell (ship, 1957) =

Dutch-flagged schooner

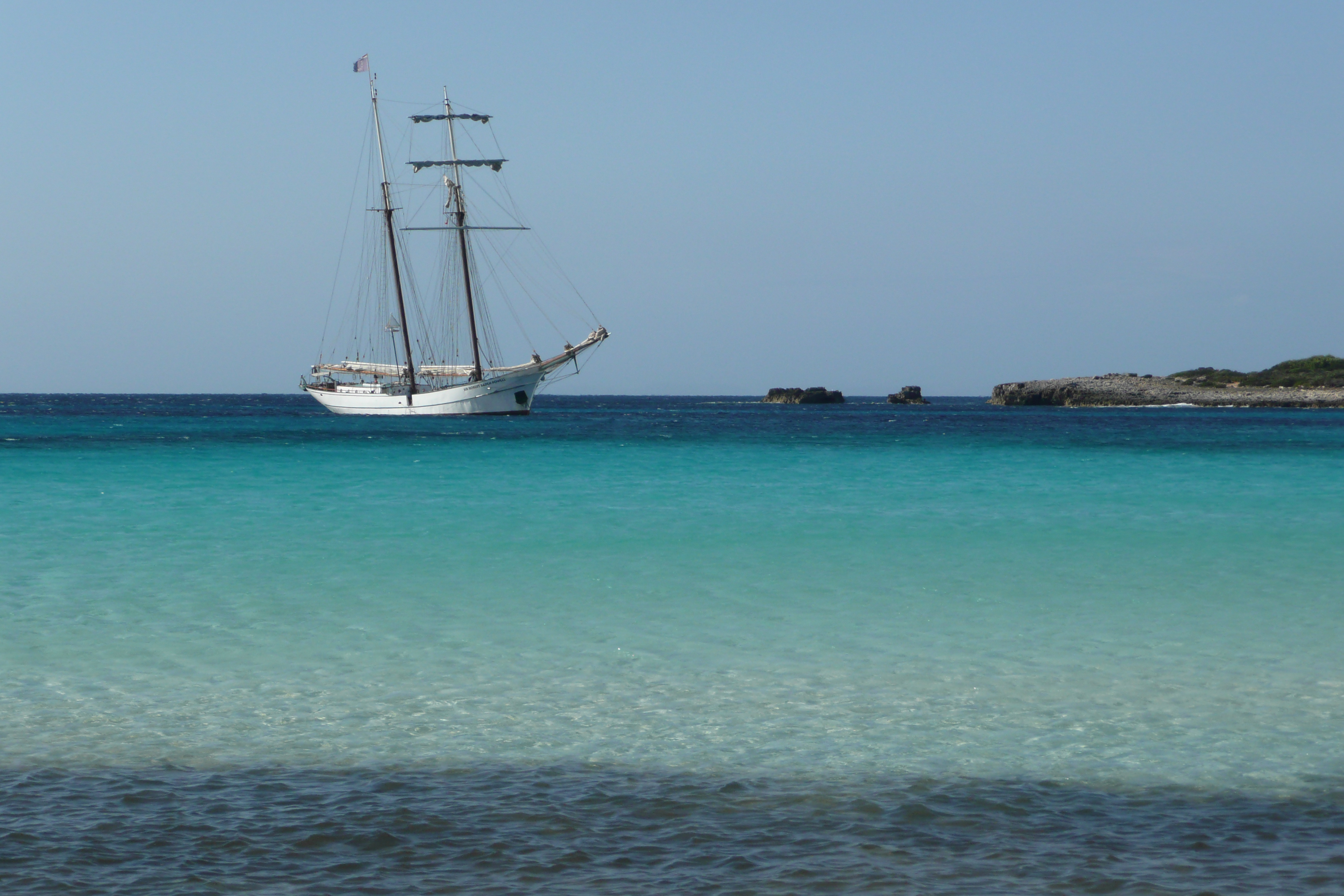

History

NE
- Name: Sir Robert Baden Powell
- Laid down: 1957
- Identification: IMO number: 5297414

General characteristics
- Displacement: 250 tons
- Length: 42 meters (138 ft)
- Beam: 6.3 meters (21 ft))
- Complement: 4/5

Sir Robert Baden Powell is a 42m steel-hulled schooner flying the Dutch flag. Her home port is Lemmer in the Netherlands. She is named after Lord Robert Baden-Powell, the founder of Scouting.

== Background ==
The schooner was built in Magdeburg, East Germany in 1957 and launched under the name Robert.

In 1991, she was refitted to give the appearance of a Baltimore Clipper and named after the founder of the scouting movement, Sir Robert Baden Powell.

She took part in the 2008 Brest Maritime Festival.

In 2024, she rescued the 15 survivors of the Bayesian sinking off Sicily.

== See also ==
- Brest Maritime Festival
