= Autonomy Corporation =

British software company, 1996–2017

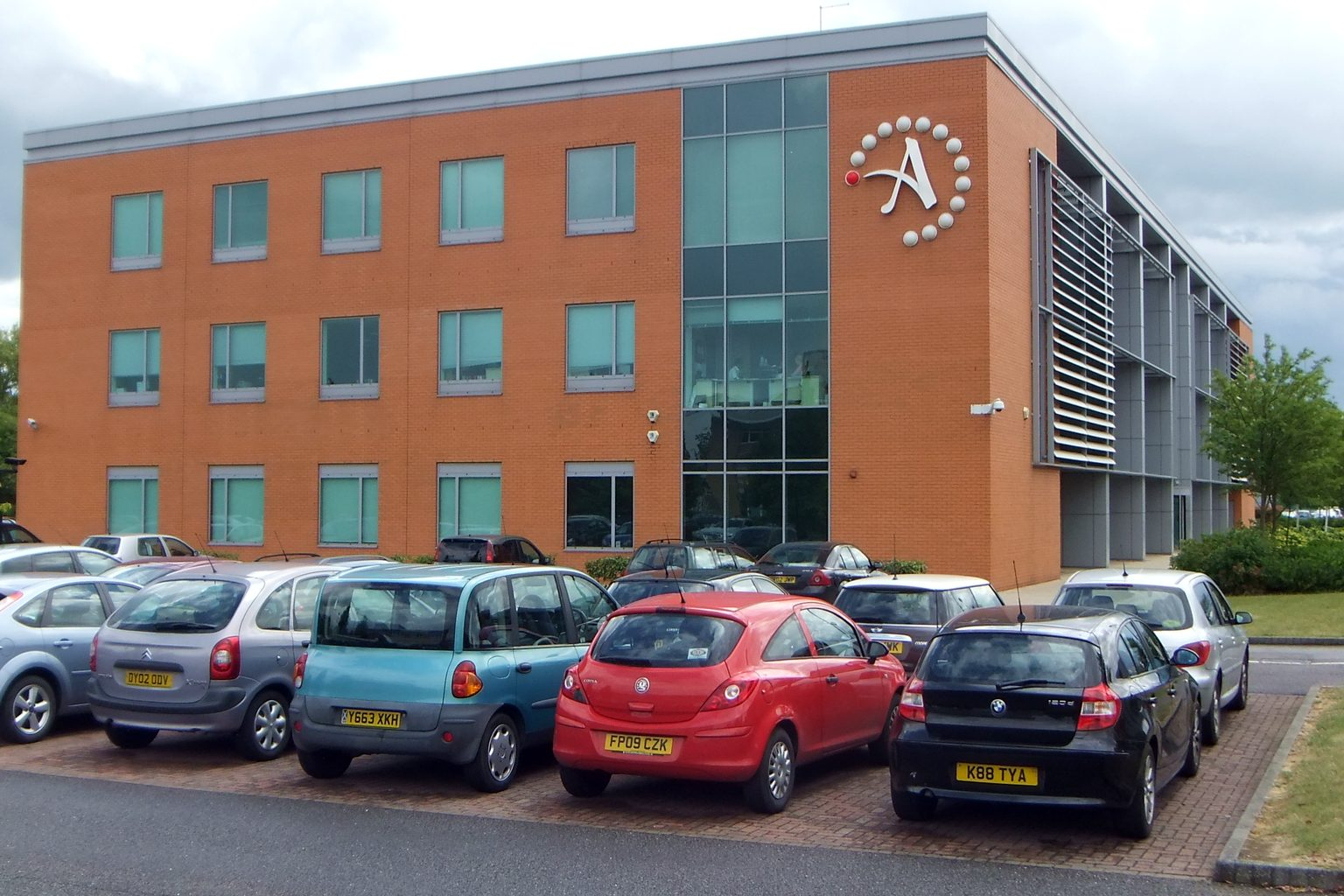
- Headquarters at Cambridge Business Park, pictured in 2011
- Formerly: HP Autonomy (2011–2015)
- Industry: Information technology
- Founded: June 1996; 30 years ago (as Autonomy Corporation PLC); Cambridge, England, U.K.
- Founder: Michael Lynch; Richard Gaunt
- Defunct: 2017; 9 years ago
- Fate: Assets divided and later merged with Micro Focus and OpenText
- Successor: OpenText
- Headquarters: Cambridge, United Kingdom; San Francisco, United States
- Area served: Global
- Key people: Robert Youngjohns (SVP & General Manager)
- Products: Big data analytics, information governance, data protection and digital marketing

Autonomy Corporation PLC was an enterprise software company founded in Cambridge, United Kingdom in 1996. The company developed and sold a variety of enterprise software, including for big data analytics, information governance, data protection, and digital marketing.

Autonomy was acquired by Hewlett-Packard (HP) in October 2011, renaming it HP Autonomy. The deal valued Autonomy at $11.7 billion (£7.4 billion). Within a year, HP had written off $8.8 billion of Autonomy's value. HP claimed this resulted from "serious accounting improprieties" and "outright misrepresentations" by the previous management. The former CEO, Mike Lynch, said that the problems were due to HP's running of Autonomy.

HP recruited Robert Youngjohns, ex-Microsoft president of North America, to take over HP Autonomy in September 2012. In 2015, HP was split into HP Inc and Hewlett Packard Enterprise (HPE); HP Autonomy assets were divided between them with HPE taking the larger part. HP Inc later sold its Autonomy content management assets to Canadian software company OpenText in 2016. In 2017, HPE sold its remaining Autonomy assets, as part of a wider deal, to the British software company Micro Focus. In 2023, OpenText acquired Micro Focus, and reunited the two halves of former Autonomy assets.

== History ==
=== Inception and expansion ===
Autonomy was founded in Cambridge, England by Michael Lynch and Richard Gaunt in 1996 as a spin-off from Cambridge Neurodynamics, a firm specializing in computer-based fingerprint recognition. It used a combination of technologies born out of research at the University of Cambridge and developed a variety of enterprise search and knowledge management applications using adaptive pattern recognition techniques centered on Bayesian inference in conjunction with traditional methods. It maintained an aggressively entrepreneurial marketing approach, and sales controls described as a "rod of iron" - allegedly firing the weakest 5% of its sales force each quarter whilst cosseting the best sales staff "like rock stars".

Autonomy floated in 1998 on the EASDAQ exchange at a share price of approximately £0.30. At the height of the "dot-com bubble", the peak share price was £30.

December 2005: Autonomy acquired Verity, Inc., one of its main competitors, for approximately US$500 million. In 2005 Autonomy also acquired Neurodynamics.

May 2007: After exercising an option to buy a stake in technology start up Blinkx Inc, and combining it with its consumer division, Autonomy floated Blinkx on a valuation of $250 million.

July 2007: Autonomy acquired Zantaz, an email archiving and litigation support company, for $375 million.

October 2007: Autonomy acquired Meridio Holdings Ltd, a UK company based in Northern Ireland that specialised in Records Management software, for £20 million.

28 May 2008: Kainos extended its partnership with Autonomy for high-end information processing and Information Risk Management (IRM) to deliver information governance solutions to its customer base.

January 2009: Autonomy acquired Interwoven, a niche provider of enterprise content management software, for $775 million. Interwoven became Autonomy Interwoven and Autonomy iManage.

In 2009 Paul Morland, a leading analyst, started raising concerns about Autonomy's exaggerated performance claims.

June 2010: Autonomy announced that it was to acquire the Information Governance business of CA Technologies. Terms of the sale were not disclosed.

5 May 2011: The Mercedes Formula One team announced an $8 million sponsorship deal with Autonomy, and on 8 July 2010 Tottenham Hotspur FC announced a two-year sponsorship deal with Autonomy for its Premier League kit. For the 2011–12 season Spurs' Premier League shirt featured Autonomy's augmented reality technology Aurasma.

16 May 2011: Autonomy acquired Iron Mountain Digital, a pioneer in E-discovery and online backup solutions provider, for $380 million from Iron Mountain Incorporated.

=== Hewlett-Packard ===
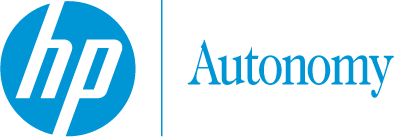
Logo of Autonomy following acquisition by Hewlett-Packard (HP)

On 18 August 2011, Hewlett-Packard (HP) announced that it would purchase Autonomy for US$42.11 per share with a premium of around 79% over market price that was widely criticized as "absurdly high", a "botched strategy shift" and a "chaotic" attempt to rapidly reposition HP and enhance earnings by expanding the high-margin software services sector. The transaction was unanimously approved by the boards of directors of both HP and Autonomy and the Autonomy board recommended that its shareholders accept the offer. On 3 October 2011 HP closed the deal, announcing that it had acquired around 87.3% of the shares for around $10.2 billion, and valuing the company at around $11.7 billion in total.

On 10 January 2012, legal entity Autonomy Corporation PLC was converted into private company Autonomy Corporation Limited.

In May 2012, Mike Lynch left his role as Autonomy CEO after a significant drop in revenue in the previous quarter.

In September 2012, Robert Youngjohns was appointed SVP & GM of Autonomy/Information Management Business Unit.

In November 2012, Hewlett-Packard announced that it was taking an $8.8 billion accounting charge after claiming "serious accounting improprieties" and "outright misrepresentations" at Autonomy; its share price fell to a decades' low on the news. Previous management in turn accused HP of a "textbook example of defensive stalling" to conceal evidence of its own prior knowledge and gross mismanagement and undermining of the company, noting public awareness since 2009 of its financial reporting issues and that even HP's CFO disagreed with the price paid. External observers stated that only a small part of the write-off appeared to be due to accounting mis-statements, and that HP had overpaid for businesses previously. Lynch said that the problems were due to HP's running of Autonomy, citing "internecine warfare" within the organization. Major culture clashes had been reported in the press.

The Serious Fraud Office (United Kingdom), and the U.S. Securities and Exchange Commission joined the FBI in investigating the potential anomalies. In January 2015, the SFO closed its investigation as the chance of successful prosecution was low.

Three lawsuits were brought by shareholders against HP, for the fall in value of HP shares. In August 2014, a United States district court judge threw out a proposed settlement involving a fee of up to $48 million: Autonomy's previous management had argued the settlement would be collusive and was intended to divert scrutiny of HP executives' own responsibility and knowledge.

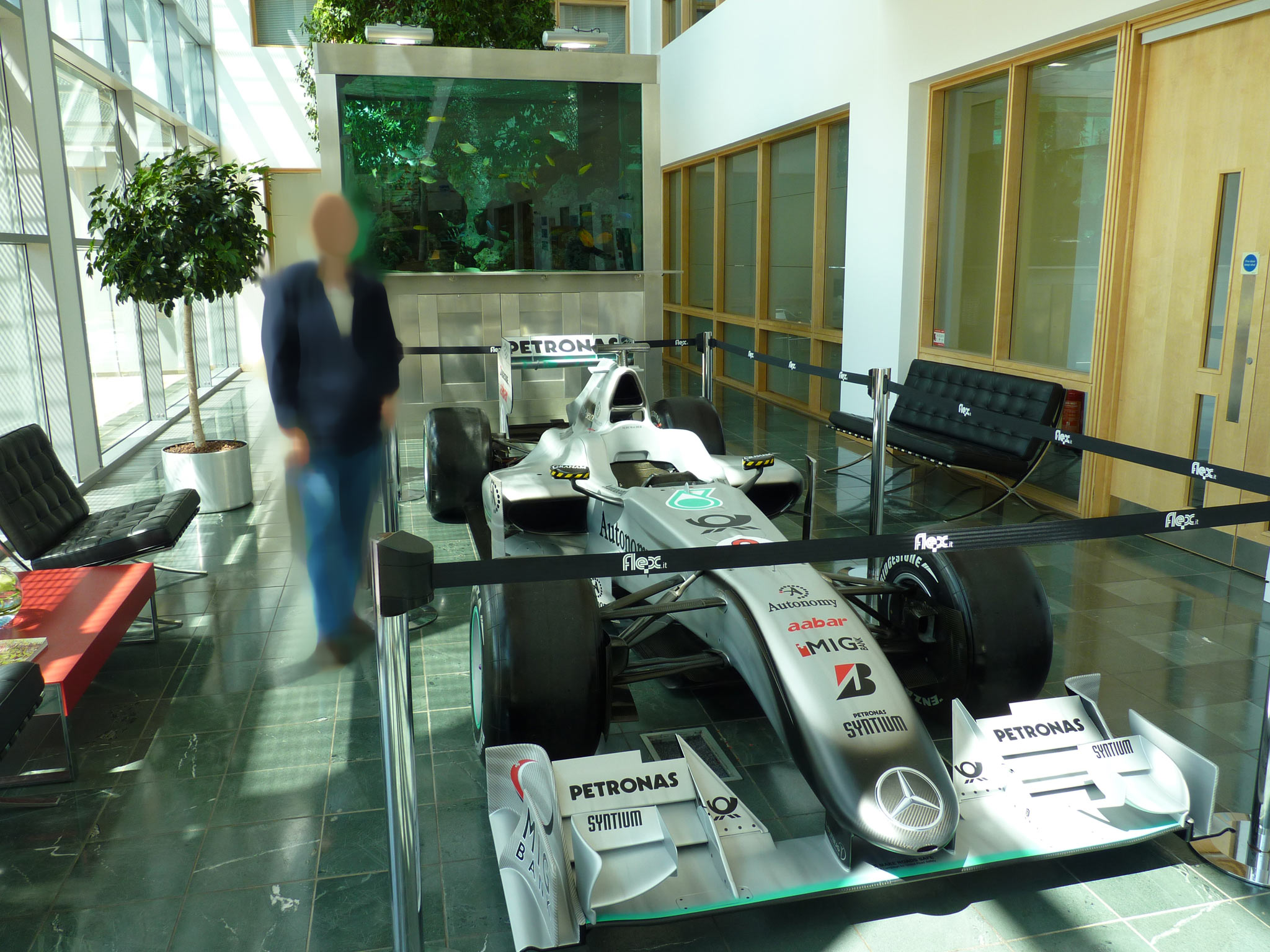
Model of 2009 Brawn GP Formula One Team car in Mercedes F1 livery at the Cambridge Business Park Autonomy building lobby.

In November 2013, the HP Exstream customer communication management (CCM) business, formerly part of the HP LaserJet and Enterprise Solutions (LES) business, joined the HP Autonomy organization.

On 30 January 2014, the company announced that one of its partners, Kainos, had integrated HP IDOL 10.5, the new version of HP Autonomy's information analytics engine, into Kainos's electronic medical record platform, Evolve.

On 31 October 2015, Autonomy's software products were divided between HP Inc (HPQ) and Hewlett Packard Enterprise (HPE) as a result of the Hewlett-Packard Company separation. HP Inc was assigned ownership largely consisting of Autonomy's content management software components including TeamSite, Qfiniti, Qfiniti Managed Services, MediaBin, Optimost, and Explore. Hewlett Packard Enterprise retained ownership of the remaining software and legal entity of Autonomy Corporation Limited.

=== Acquisition by Micro Focus and OpenText ===
OpenText acquired HP TeamSite, HP MediaBin, HP Qfiniti, HP Explore, HP Aurasma, and HP Optimost from HP Inc for $170 million on 2 May 2016.

In 2017, HPE sold its Autonomy assets, as part of a wider deal valued at $8.8 billion, to the British software company Micro Focus. Micro Focus acquired the operating subsidiary Autonomy Systems Limited and related foreign subsidiaries on 1 September 2017. Legal entity and former parent company Autonomy Corporation Limited was merged with fellow HPE subsidiary ACL Netherlands B.V. and ceased to exist.

In April 2018 Autonomy's ex-CFO Sushovan Hussain was charged in the US and found guilty of accounting fraud, and subsequently allowed out on bail after his appeal raised a "substantial question over his conviction." Hussain's appeal failed in August 2020.

Based on Hussain's evidence, Lynch and Stephen Chamberlain, former vice president of finance at Autonomy, were charged with fraud in November 2018. Lynch said he would contest extradition and that he "vigorously rejects all the allegations against him."

In March 2019, HP brought a civil action in the UK courts. The case was heard in a trial lasting 93 days, with Lynch present in the witness box for 22 days, making it one of the longest cross-examinations in British legal history. In January 2022, the High Court in London ruled that HP had "substantially won" its civil case against Lynch and Hussain in which HP claimed that the two individuals had "artificially inflated Autonomy's reported revenues, revenue growth and gross margins". Lynch and Chamberlain went on trial in San Francisco on 18 March 2024. Lynch was charged with 16 counts of wire fraud, securities fraud and conspiracy, while Chamberlain faced 15 counts of wire fraud and conspiracy. Both pleaded not guilty. The court heard evidence and arguments over the course of 11 weeks, and one count of securities fraud was dropped. The jury retired for deliberation on 4 June. On 6 June 2024, Lynch and Chamberlain were found not guilty of all charges.

In September 2020, Deloitte, who audited Autonomy between 2009 and 2011, were fined £15m for its audits that contained “serious and serial failures”.

In August 2022, OpenText announced that it would acquire Micro Focus in a deal valued at US$6 billion. The acquisition was approved by the court on 27 January 2023, the transaction was completed on 31 January 2023.

In August 2024, Lynch celebrated his acquittal in the San Francisco trial with a cruise on the family superyacht, Bayesian. He was joined by his wife and daughter and nine invited guests, including two lawyers from his defense team. In the early hours of 19 August, the yacht sank off the coast of Sicily, outside the port of Porticello, during a powerful storm, with 22 people on board. Lynch, his teenage daughter Hannah, four guests, and one member of the crew died. Chamberlain died one day later, on 20 August 2024, three days after he was hit by a car while out jogging in Stretham.

== Products and services ==
HP Autonomy products include Intelligent Data Operating Layer (IDOL), which allows for search and processing of text taken from both structured data and unstructured human information—including e-mail and mobile data—whether it originates in a database, audio, video, text files or streams. The processing of such information by IDOL is referred to by Autonomy as Meaning-Based Computing.

HP Autonomy's offerings include:

Marketing Optimization
Web Experience Management, Web Optimization, Search Engine Marketing, Marketing Analytics, Contact Center Management, Rich Media Management
Information Analytics
Voice of the Customer, Media Intelligence, Video Surveillance, Big Data Analytics, SFA Intelligence
Unified Information Access
Enterprise Search, Knowledge Management, Content Access & Extraction
Information Archiving
Compliance Archiving, Litigation Readiness Archiving, Storage Optimization Archiving, Database & Application Archiving, Supervision & Policy Management
eDiscovery
Legal Hold, Early Case Assessment, Review & Analytics, Investigations, Post-Review
Enterprise Content Management
Policy-driven Information Management, Records Management, Legal Content Management, Business Process Management, Document and Email Management
Data Protection
Server Data Protection, Virtual Server Data Protection, Remote & Branch Office Data Protection, Endpoint Device Data Protection
Customer Communications Management
Healthcare Communications, Transactional Communications, State, Local & Federal Communications, Utility & Smart Meter Communications, High Volume Communications
Automated Information Capture
Multichannel automated information capture:, Intelligent document recognition, Intelligent document classification, Remote capture, Validation
Haven OnDemand
The API platform for building data rich applications. Haven OnDemand features a wide range of APIs for indexing and performing analytics on a range of information from plain text and office documents through to audio and video.
Haven Search OnDemand
An easy-to-use and quick-to-deploy Enterprise Search solution built onto of the Haven OnDemand API Platform.

== Offices ==
The Autonomy business had primary offices in Cambridge, England, and Sunnyvale, California, as well as other major offices in the UK, the US, Canada, France, Japan, Australia, Singapore, Germany, and smaller offices in India and throughout Europe and Latin America.
