= Lulworth (yacht) =

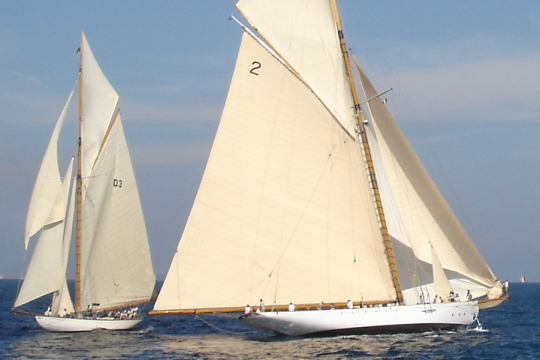
- Tuiga (D3) and Lulworth (2) in race. France, 2006

History

United Kingdom
- Name: Lulworth
- Namesake: Lulworth Castle
- Port of registry: Guernsey
- Builder: White Brothers, Itchen Ferry (1920); Classic Yacht Darsena, Viareggio (2006)
- Christened: Terpsichore (1920); Lulworth (1924)
- Yacht designer: Herbert William White (1919); Paul Spooner (2001)
- Burgee: Royal Yacht Squadron (1920)

General characteristics
- Class & type: British Big Class gaff-rigged cutter
- Displacement: 188 tonnes (2006); of which ballast 80 tonnes
- Length: 46.30 m (151 ft 11 in) overall; 36.87 m (121 ft) on deck (rating); 28.64 m (94 ft) waterline (rating)
- Beam: 6.60 m (21 ft 8 in)
- Draught: 5.50 m (18 ft 1 in)
- Sail plan: spars (1926/2006): 52.00 m (170 ft 7 in) spruce mast; 27.60 m (90 ft 7 in) spruce boom; 20.00 m (65 ft 7 in) sitka spinnaker pole; Sails: 465 m^{2} (5,010 sq ft) mainsail; 133 m^{2} (1,430 sq ft) marconi topsail; 114 m^{2} (1,230 sq ft) staysail; 69.5 m^{2} (748 sq ft) jib; 46.5 m^{2} (501 sq ft) jib topsail; 500 m^{2} (5,400 sq ft) spinnaker
- Build: mahogany planking on steel frames

Lulworth is a racing yacht that was built in Southampton in 1920.

== The Big Class ==
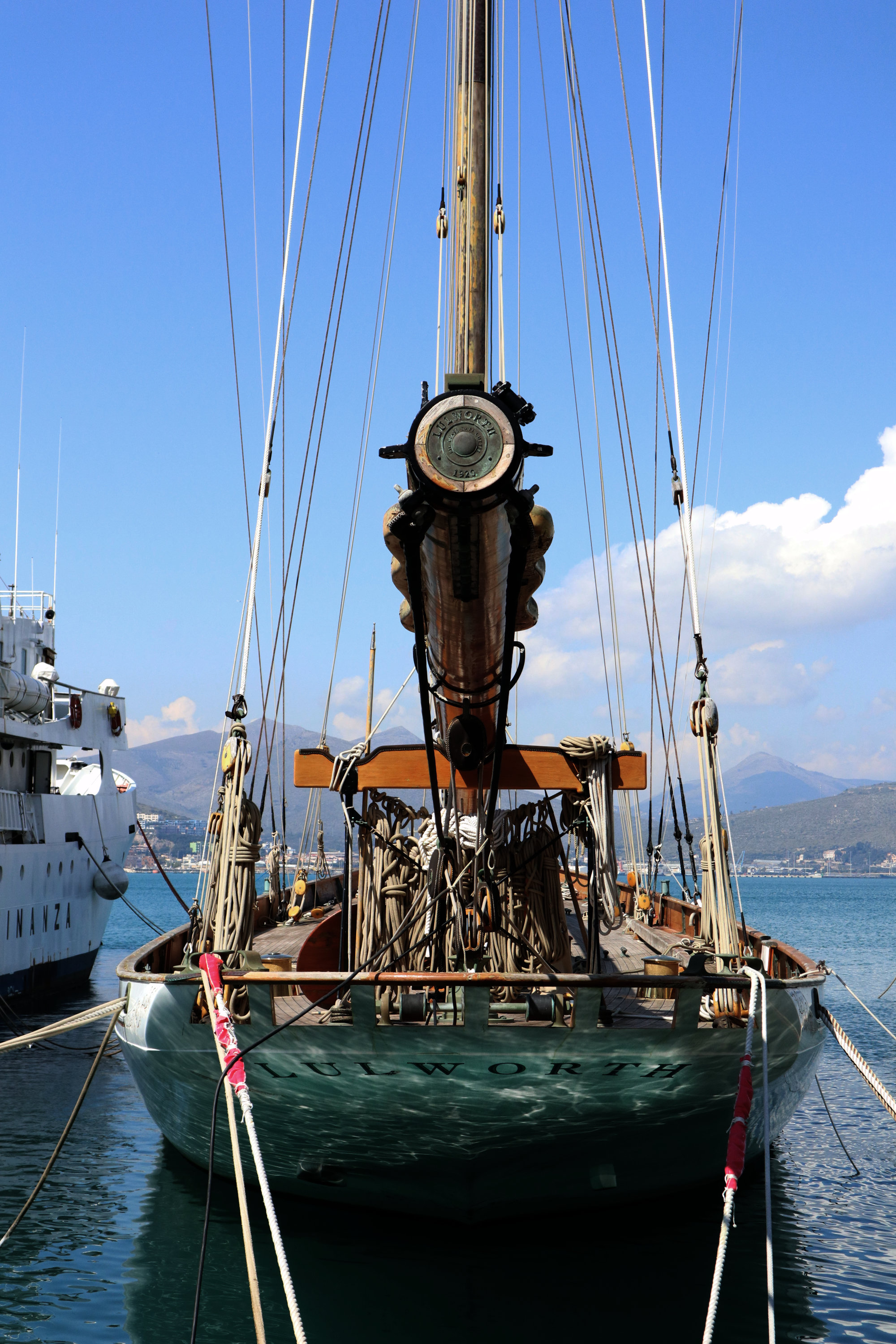

The boat's name comes from Lulworth Castle, which belonged to her second owner, Herbert Weld, whose grandfather was a charter-member of the Royal Yacht Squadron. The Lulworth (1920) was built by the White Brothers' Yard for Richard H. Lee, who wanted a racing boat to compete in the premier yachting league in Europe: the British "Big Class".

Shortages in the supply of premium spruce after World War I meant that Lulworth's original lower-mast was made of steel instead of wood. This constraint handicapped Lulworth greatly, leaving her trailing older, more famous Big Class racers like Thomas Benjamin Frederick Davis's Herreshoff-designed schooner Westward (1910), HMY Britannia I (1893) and Sir Thomas J. Lipton's Fife-designed 23mR Shamrock (1908).

Her gaff-rigged sail plan was updated several times to no avail, until America's Cup naval architect Charles Ernest Nicholson redesigned the rig with a wooden lower-mast and adjusted the keel balance. By 1924, Lulworth's flaws were corrected and she became an accomplished racer in all subsequent seasons of the Big Class: from 1920 to 1930, she took part in 258 regattas, taking 59 first places, 47 of which were after 1924.

== Obsolescence and revival ==
The 1930 America's Cup saw the arrival of the innovative J-Class designs that made all gaff-rigged yachts obsolete. Despite The Lulworth's early successes against the J-Class Shamrock V (1930) before the America's Cup, handicapping rules in the Big Class were ended and Lulworth's racing career was over. In 1947 Lulworth was saved from the scrap yard by Richard Lucas and his wife Rene. She was taken to Whites Shipyard for restoration and mud-berthed in the River Hamble where she served as a houseboat.

In 1990 her hull was shipped to Italy in hopes of a refit. In 2001 she was bought by Johan J.M. van den Bruele a Dutch yachtsman who owned a mall shipyard for classic boats in Viareggio. A meticulous renovation was started in 2002 which saved 70% of her furnishings and 80% of her steel frames. The sail plan from 1926 was replicated to recreate Lulworth's rig, which features the world's tallest wooden mast. She was relaunched in 2006. Lulworth immediately re-entered racing competition and subsequently won a Boat International Award for the "Best refit of 2006". Lulworth is the world's largest gaff-rigged cutter.

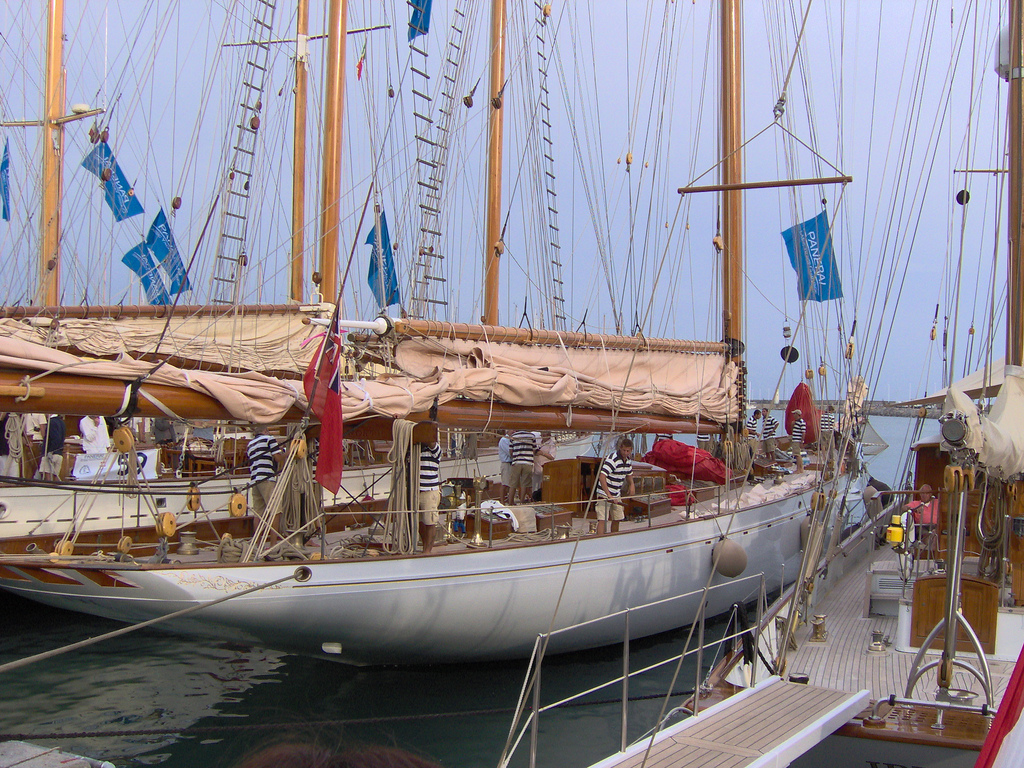
Vele d'Epoca Imperia, 2006

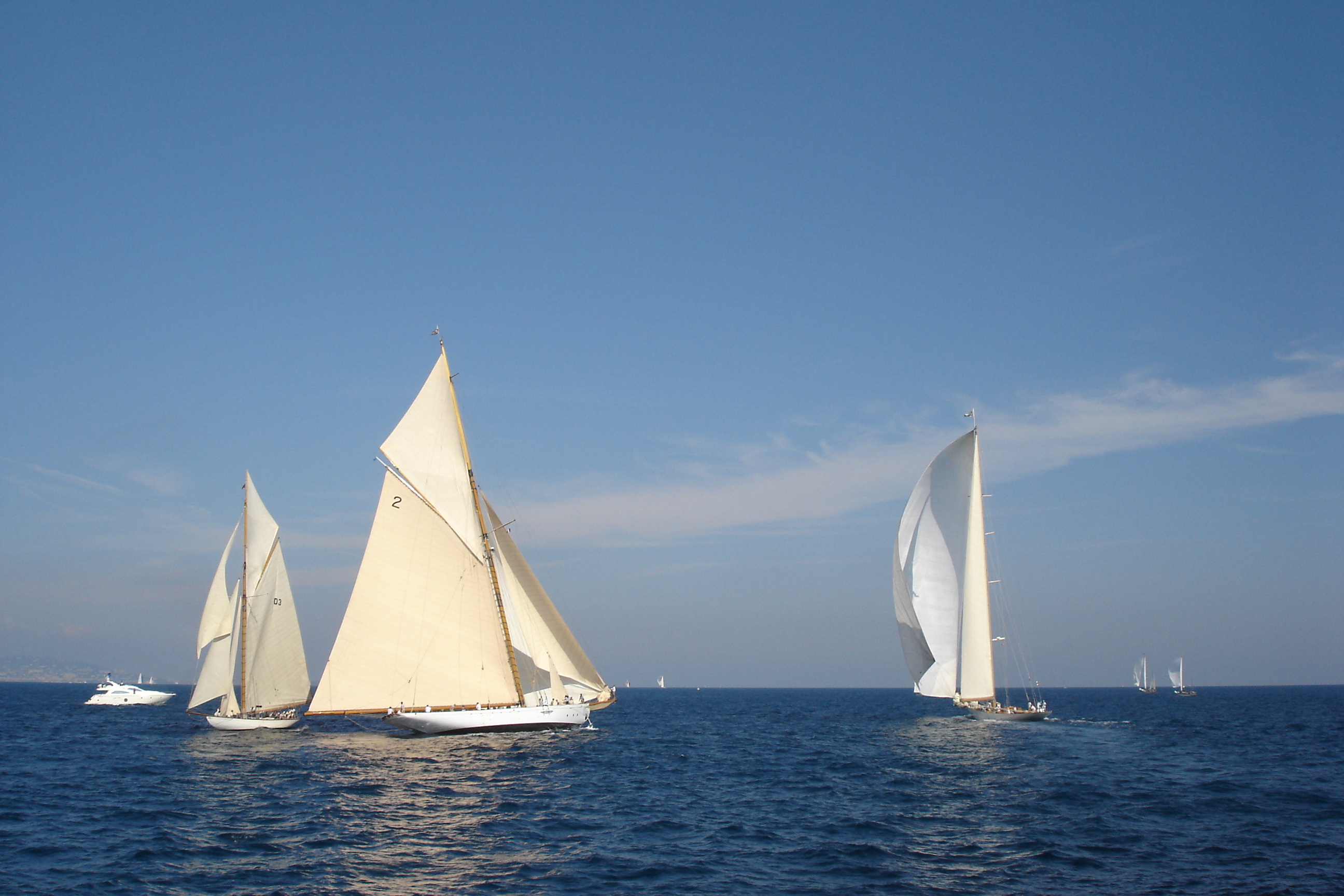
Regates Royales, 2006

== See also ==
- List of large sailing yachts
- Yacht racing
- Comparison of large sloops
