= Bayesian (yacht) =

Sailing superyacht sunk in 2024

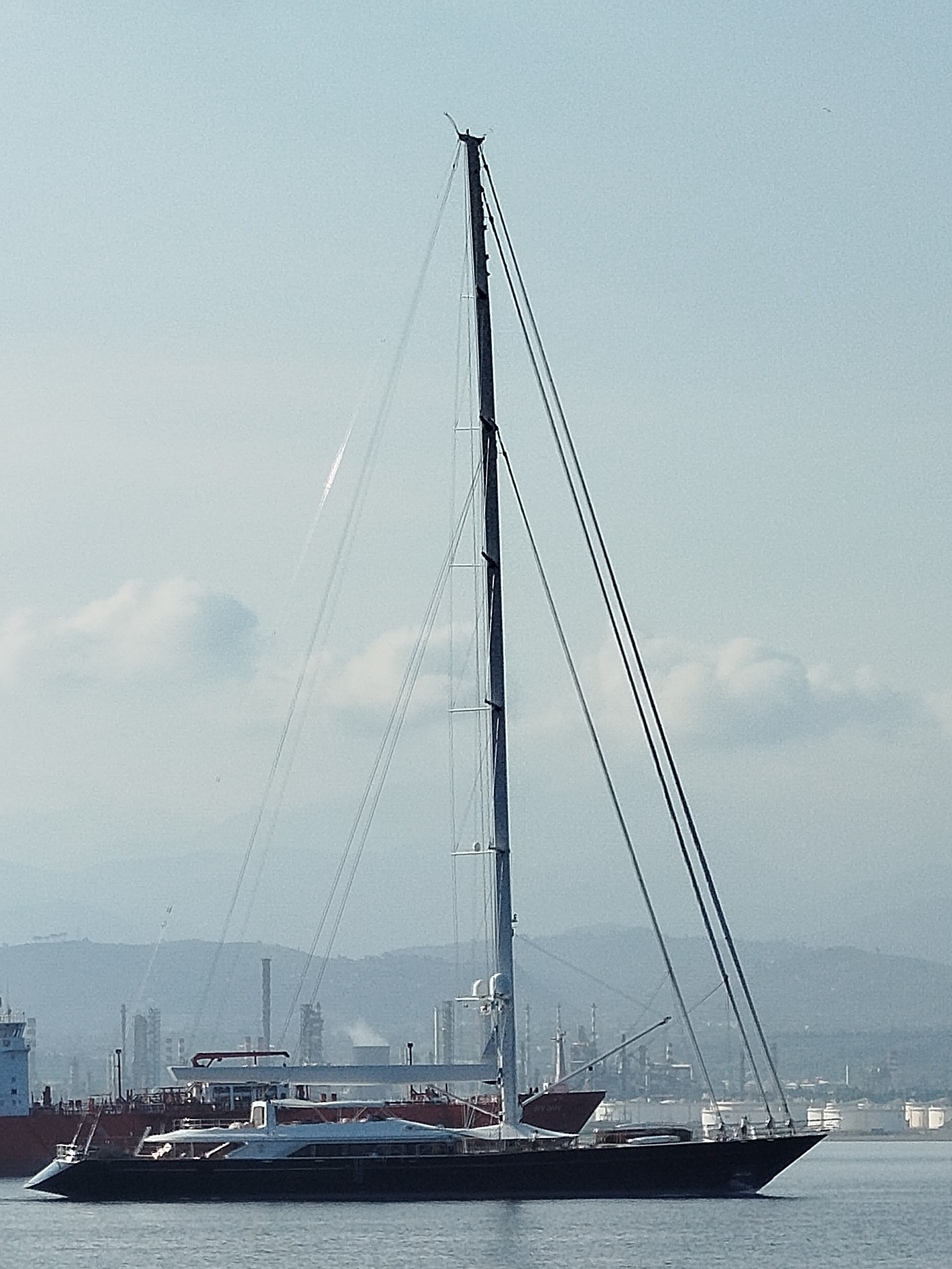
- Bayesian at Milazzo, Sicily, in 2024

History
- Name: 2008–2014: Salute; 2014–2024: Bayesian
- Namesake: Bayesian inference
- Owner: 2008: Eric Albada Jelgersma; 2008–2014: John Groenewoud; 2014–2024: Revtom Ltd (Angela Bacares)
- Operator: 2022–2024: Camper & Nicholsons International
- Port of registry: 2008–2010, 2013–2014 (Netherlands); 2010–2013 (Malta) Valletta; 2014–2024: (United Kingdom) London
- Builder: Perini Navi, Viareggio, Italy
- Cost: £30M
- Completed: 2008
- Out of service: 19 August 2024
- Refit: 2020
- Identification: IMO number: 9503392; Call sign: 2ICB8 (2014–2024)
- Fate: Sank in a storm off Porticello, Sicily

General characteristics
- Class & type: Superyacht; flybridge sloop
- Tonnage: 473 GT
- Displacement: 543 t (534 long tons)
- Length: 56.0 m (184 ft)
- Beam: 11.5 m (38 ft)
- Height: Mast 72 m (236 ft) above DWL
- Draught: 4 m (13 ft); 10 m (33 ft) with retractable keel fully extended
- Installed power: MTU (8V 2000 M72) 8-cylinder 965hp 1,440 kW (1,930 hp)
- Propulsion: Single shaft; fixed pitch propeller
- Sail plan: Cutter rig; 2,900 m^{2} (31,000 sq ft)
- Speed: 12 knots (22 km/h; 14 mph) (cruising)
- Range: 3,600 nm @ 13 knots (24 km/h; 15 mph)
- Boats & landing craft carried: Two tenders
- Capacity: 12 guests
- Crew: 10
- Notes: Aluminium hull, superstructure and mast; tallest ever mast at launch Ballast: retractable keel 60 tonnes; fixed keel box 140 tonnes Fuel: 49,700 litres (10,900 imp gal) / 58,700 litres (12,900 imp gal); (Note: From the site's technical data and plans section and downloadable brochure respectively.) fresh water: 10,900 litres (2,400 imp gal) / 15,500 litres (3,400 imp gal)

Bayesian (/ˈbeɪziən/ BAY-zee-ən or /ˈbeɪʒən/ BAY-zhən) was a 56-metre (184 ft) sailing superyacht, built as Salute by Perini Navi at Viareggio, Italy, and delivered in 2008. It had a 72-metre (237 ft) mast, one of the tallest in the world. The yacht was last refitted in 2020. It was in the legal ownership of Angela Bacares, wife of British technology entrepreneur Mike Lynch. It was at anchor off the northern coast of Sicily near Porticello on 19 August 2024, when it was struck shortly before dawn by a powerful storm and sank.

== Design and construction ==
Bayesian was a sloop designed by Ron Holland and built by Perini Navi with a 56 m (184 ft) long aluminium hull and superstructure and a single-masted cutter rig. One of the world's largest sailing yachts, it was one of a number of similar vessels from this designer and shipyard, though the only one of their ten 56-metre series that, at the initial client's request, was not a two-masted ketch. The mast of 72 m (237 ft), as measured from the designwaterline (DWL), was at the time of construction the world's tallest yacht mast and continues to be the world's tallest aluminium one. The yacht had a retracting keel, allowing its draught to be reduced from 10 m (33 ft) to 4 m (13 ft). It had a traditional aft cockpit, an additional 60 m^{2} (650 sq ft) fully encloseable cockpit forward, and a flying bridge. The interior was outfitted in Japanese style by the French company Rémi Tessier Design. The yacht won best interior at the International Superyacht Society Awards 2008, and best sailing yacht over 45 m (148 ft) at the 2009 World Superyacht Awards.

== History ==
The yacht, allocated IMO Number 9503392, was ordered by Dutch entrepreneur Eric Albada Jelgersma (1939–2018), but in 2005 he was paralysed in a yachting accident; on completion it was sold in 2008 to Dutch property developer John Groenewoud and named Salute. In November 2014, it was sold to Revtom Ltd., an Isle of Man company owned by Angela Bacares, wife of the technology entrepreneur Mike Lynch, and renamed Bayesian, a reference to Bayesian inference, which was used in statistical machine learning by Lynch's company Autonomy Corporation. From then, the yacht was registered in the United Kingdom, with London as port of registry. It was refitted in 2016 and again in 2020 and was managed since 2022 by Camper & Nicholsons International. The yacht had been put up for sale in the spring of 2024 but was withdrawn from the market in July for the summer.

== Sinking and aftermath ==
=== Sinking ===
Lynch was celebrating his acquittal for fraud in his trial in San Francisco and had invited lawyers, friends and associates to join him, his wife and their daughter, to visit the Aeolian Islands, off the northern coast of Sicily. Bayesian sank shortly before daybreak on 19 August 2024 during a storm when anchored 300 metres (980 ft) off the port of Porticello, a small fishing village about 15 kilometres (9.3 mi) east of Palermo, Sicily. Admiral Raffaele Macauda of the Palermo coastguard said there was no storm alert for that evening and the weather forecast was of isolated thunderstorms but not of any extreme weather systems. Karsten Börner (sometimes written Borner), captain of Sir Robert Baden Powell, which was anchored nearby, said that in the event, the wind was "violent, very violent" and thought it reached force 12 on the Beaufort scale—hurricane strength. He said: "It was tonnes of water coming down. I never saw that before, there was a water tornado". Although early eyewitness accounts led to reports that the yacht had been struck by a waterspout, the Italian authorities said a downburst was more likely.

Data from the tracking of the automatic identification system (AIS) showed that at 3:50 a.m. CEST Bayesian was already being buffeted by the storm and then began to drag its anchor. At 4:05 a.m. it was entirely underwater and a few seconds later its emergency position-indicating radiobeacon (EPIRB) raised the alarm, which was picked up by the satellite station managed by the Bari Coast Guard. Power had been lost by 3:56 a.m. as electrical circuits became flooded. Börner said: "I have never seen a vessel of this size go down so quickly. Within a few minutes, there was nothing left." The yacht came to rest on its starboard side on the seabed at a depth of 50 metres (160 ft).

=== Rescue and recovery ===
The yacht had been carrying ten crew and twelve passengers. The fifteen survivors were rescued from their inflatable life raft by Börner and his crew. One body was recovered from the sea, while six people remained missing. Divers from the fire and rescue service immediately began searching the wreck. The task was challenging on account of the depth, which limited divers to eight minutes to work on the wreck. They also found access to the cabins was blocked by furniture. Six bodies were eventually recovered from the interior of the yacht on 21, 22, and 23 August. The yacht was lying on its right side on the sea floor, and the bodies of the passengers were found in cabins on the left side where, investigators suggested, they had been taking refuge. Post-mortem examinations revealed that four of the deceased had no water in their lungs, suggesting they had died of asphyxiation, in an air pocket, some time after the sinking.

==== Survivors ====
The fifteen survivors were Angela Bacares and five guests, captain James Cutfield, and eight other members of the crew.

==== Dead ====
- Jonathan Bloomer, chairman of Morgan Stanley International and past chairman of Autonomy Corporation
- Judy Bloomer, wife of Jonathan Bloomer
- Mike Lynch, founder of Autonomy Corporation and Invoke Capital
- Hannah Lynch, daughter of Mike Lynch
- Christopher J. Morvillo, partner at Clifford Chance US LLP and Lynch's lawyer
- Neda Morvillo (née Nassiri), jewellery designer and wife of Christopher Morvillo
- Recaldo Thomas, the yacht's chef

On 25 August, a special mass and candlelit vigil were held for the victims in Porticello and wreaths were laid on the sea.

=== Speculation about causes ===
In the immediate aftermath of the sinking, there was media speculation about how Bayesian could have sunk so quickly, especially as a nearby yacht was undamaged in the storm. The editor of Sailing Today suggested that the exceptionally tall mast might have affected the yacht's stability, while the chair of the Maritime Search and Rescue Council described the sinking as a potential black swan event. A former captain of Bayesian said that ventilation ducts on the yacht were vulnerable to downflooding over 40–45 degrees of heel. A naval architect interviewed by a yachting magazine opined that the low positioning of the cockpits and a heavy salon door that could slide open were also possible ingress points for downflooding. Turkish TV interviewed a yacht builder who suggested that a hatch might have been open or that a door might have been open between watertight compartments, and an oceanographer who suggested that the wide beam might have contributed to the wind pinning the yacht and that the height of the mast might have prevented turtling after it capsized. There was speculation that a large door on the port side may have been left open; The Times, however, reported that a photograph taken from the Sir Robert Baden Powell 14 minutes before the sinking appeared to show that the door was closed.

Luca Mercalli, president of the Italian Meteorological Society, said that the authorities had issued a moderate weather alert, and that weather radar enabled the arrival of an intense thunderstorm to be estimated 15 to 30 minutes in advance, although it was impossible to predict the level of wind intensity. He said that record high sea surface temperatures around Sicily at the time could have increased the intensity of storms in the area. Giovanni Costantino, chief executive officer of The Italian Sea Group, which now owned the shipyard which built the yacht, defended its design, describing it as "unsinkable" and suggested the crew should, given the approaching storm, have shut doors and hatches, started the engine, lowered the keel and faced the wind. He pointed to the fact that Sir Robert Baden Powell, built in 1957, had not been damaged in the storm. The seafarers' union Nautilus International cautioned against blaming the crew before the full facts were known, saying it was "not only unfair but also harmful to the process of uncovering the truth and learning any lessons from this tragedy".

The New York Times interviewed more than twelve naval architects and other experts who identified a number of weaknesses in the design of the yacht that may have contributed to the sinking, including: the height and weight of the mast; the positioning of air vents; two tall glass doors and a sunken deck. The retractable keel, which could have lent stability to the yacht, was in the raised position.

=== Judicial investigation and salvage ===
The chief prosecutor of nearby Termini Imerese, Ambrogio Cartosio, initiated a judicial investigation into the sinking. On 26 August, the captain of the yacht was placed under investigation. On 28 August, two British crew members were also put under investigation. Cartosio said that there were plans to salvage Bayesian. Under Italian law, the owner is responsible for the cost of salvage and the yacht would then be handed to the investigating authorities. The recovery cost will be covered by insurance while total claims related to the shipwreck could reach $150 million, according to initial estimates by industry experts.

The salvage operation got underway at the beginning of May 2025, with the arrival of the floating crane HEBO Lift 10 from Rotterdam. On 9 May 2025, a 39-year old Dutch diver died during preparations for the salvage operation, prompting a suspension of procedures. The vessel's hull was finally surfaced on 20 June, after salvage crews had detached the mast, to be recovered later, so that the hull could be raised upright. On 22 June Bayesian was put ashore in the nearby port of Termini Imerese for further examination.

=== Legal cases ===
In January 2026, the Italian Sea Group sued Lynch's widow, the yacht's owner, for 456 million euros, asserting that the sinking was due to crew negligence and incompetence and that it had a disastrous effect on their revenues.

=== MAIB investigation ===
As Bayesian was a UK-registered vessel, the Marine Accident Investigation Branch (MAIB) also opened an investigation into the causes of the sinking and sent a team of four inspectors to Italy. In May 2025, MAIB published an interim report on the sinking, having commissioned a report on weather conditions at the time from the Met Office and modelling on the stability of the yacht from the Wolfson Unit at the University of Southampton. The report gave a timeline of the sinking, from the deckhand on night watch posting an image of the approaching storm on their social media feed at 3:55 AM to the survivors in the life raft being picked up by Sir Robert Baden Powell about forty minutes later. According to the Met Office report, conditions at the time were borderline for the development of supercells. The Wolfson Unit analysis concluded that, in motoring condition (i.e. with sails lowered and the keel raised), the yacht was vulnerable to capsizing in gusting wind speeds of over 117.4 kilometres per hour (73.0 mph). The report pointed out that the yacht's vulnerability to capsizing was not evident in the stability information book and therefore not known to the crew. The report also said that the MAIB investigation was not intended to apportion blame, and was subject to change pending release of further information by the Italian authorities and examination of the wreck.

MAIB released a further report in November 2026.

== See also ==
- Yachts built by Perini Navi
- List of large sloops
- List of large sailing yachts
- Shipwrecks in 2024
