= Santa Flavia =

- Comune
- Comune di Santa Flavia
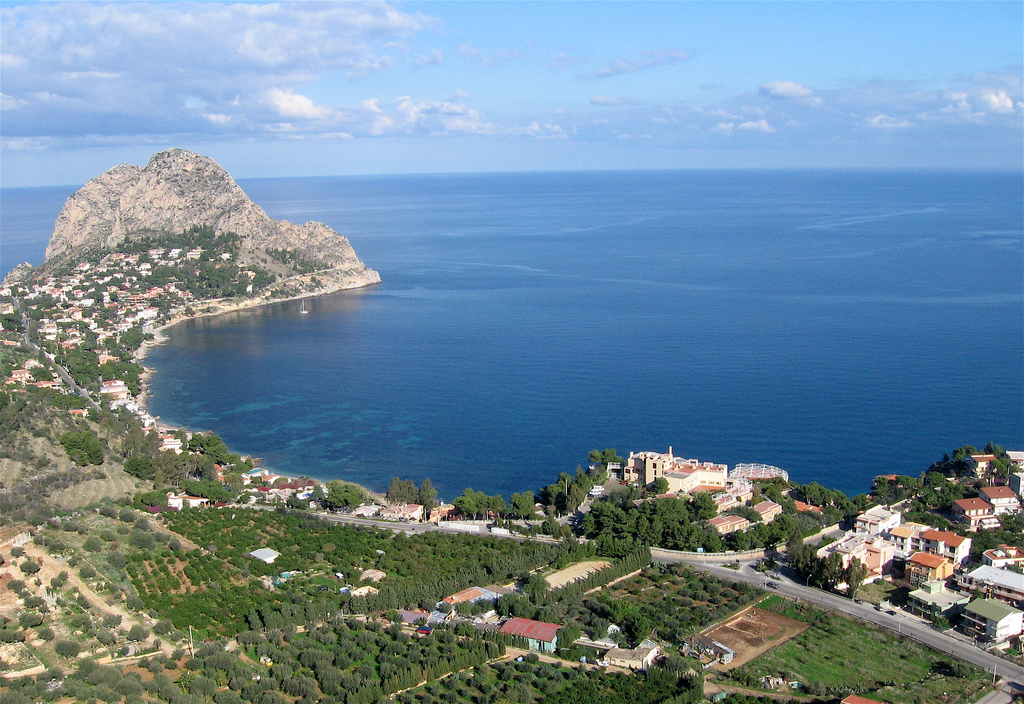
- Panorama of Santa Flavia

- Coat of arms

- Location within Italy Location within Sicily
- Coordinates: 38°5′N 13°32′E
- Country: Italy
- Region: Sicily
- Metropolitan city: Palermo (PA)
- Frazioni: Porticello, Sant'Elia, Solanto

Government
  - Mayor: Guiseppe D'Agostino

Area
  - Total: 14 km^{2} (5.4 sq mi)
- Elevation: 55 m (180 ft)

Population (31 August 2018)
  - Total: 11,186
  - Density: 800/km^{2} (2,100/sq mi)
- Demonym: Flavesi
- Time zone: UTC+1 (CET)
  - Summer (DST): UTC+2 (CEST)
- Postal code: 90017
- Dialing code: 091
- ISTAT code: 082067
- Patron saint: St. Anne
- Saint day: 26 July
- Website: Official website

Santa Flavia (known as Solunto until 1880) is a town in the Metropolitan City of Palermo, Sicily, southern Italy.

== Overview ==
The town is situated between the Gulf of Palermo and the town and hot springs known as Termini Imerese, on the Tyrrhenian Sea, 15 kilometres (9 mi) east of Palermo. Inside the town are the remains of the ancient city of Soluntum.

The main agricultural product of Santa Flavia is the grapefruit. The town is known for its variety of fresh fish. The town caters to tourism and has numerous seaside resorts.

== Archeology ==
There is an archaeological area of the Phoenician and then the Hellenistic city of Solunto. In addition to the ruins of the ancient site, a small museum, the Antiquarium, located at the entrance to the excavations, can be visited; various types of materials are on display: ceramics, fragments of painted plaster, steles, statuettes, votive reliefs, capitals and coins from Solunto and other origins.

== Monument ==
The town is famous for being one of the favorite places of the Sicilian aristocracy who built numerous residences there which represent architectural masterpieces and are rich in works of art.

- Villa Filangeri, seat of the town hall.
- Villa San Marco (Private property)
- Villa Sperlinga (Private property)
- Villa Valdina (Private property)
- Villa Campofranco is a holiday residence, built at the beginning of the 18th century by the Lucchesi Palli, Princes of Campofranco. (Private property)
- Villa Oliva is an incomplete holiday residence commissioned by a cadet member of the Branciforte family, princes of Butera. (Private property) Probably originally consisting of a vast courtyard on which a tower rose which must have ended up as a tower of the winds. Never completed, in the 19th century, it was owned by Baron Riso who sold it to the Countess of Asaro (near Mazzarino). Characteristic of the villa is the large horseshoe-shaped stable based on the French model. In the 20th century the villa, now a ruin, was purchased by a food industrialist who radically renovated it while maintaining both the stables and the grandiose holm oak avenue that constituted the courtly access.
- Villa Cefalà was built by the Pilo Counts of Capaci to manage a lush citrus grove. The tuff portal has the year 1778 engraved in the keystone. In the 20th century, the building underwent interventions. Today the complex has been converted into a farmhouse.
- Villa Torremuzza was the holiday residence of the Castelli di Torremuzza princes. Dating from the 18th century, it was destroyed after the Second World War.
- Villino Basile. First work by Ernesto Basile, created between 1874 and 1878 with the collaboration of his father Giovan Battista Filippo, the villa was the bizarre residence for the family's summer holiday, which combines a neo-Renaissance style structure with lively phytomorphic decorations that adorn the cylindrical tower on the left side, which anticipate the Liberty style. The exteriors are enlivened by the chromatic contrast between the smooth surfaces covered with red hexagonal tiles, and the decorations and ashlars in golden-yellow tuff. The building is currently in a worrying state of disrepair. (Private property)
- Castle and Royal Palace of Solanto

The castle of Sòlanto gave its name to the barony of the same name, an ancient administrative division of part of the territory of Santa Flavia, located on the sea. Built in the time of King Roger on a high cliff, it was once intended to protect an adjacent coast. As state property, the castle was assigned by Frederick III to Manfredo Layhabixa, in return for compensation from the tuna fisheries. It was the residence of Queen Blanche of Navarre. King Martin, in 1392, granted the castle and tuna fishery to Francesco de Casaya. His son sold the castle to Corrado Spadafora in 1415 and around 1500 it still belonged to this family, in the person of Giovanni Antonio Spadafora, baron of Solanto. Later it came to Gerardo Alliata, son-in-law of Spadafora (1517) in whose family it remained until around 1660 with Ludovico Alliata baron of Solanto. At that time it was sold at public auction and purchased by Asdrubale Termini, Duke of Vatticani. At the time of Charles II, Francesco Catena (1666) and then Mario Antonio Joppolo Colnago, prince of Sant'Elia (1682), were lords of the castle. Subsequently, through the female line, it came to Cristoforo Riccardo Filangeri, prince of Santa Flavia (1765). In a small room of the castle, are the coats of arms of the lords who owned it from King Roger until 1879, the year in which it came to Benedetto Mantegna, prince of Gangi. The so-called Royal Palace of Sòlanto is a wing of the castle that was restored at the beginning of the 19th century in Neo-Gothic style, to host Ferdinand I of Bourbon. (Private property)

- Perez-Raimondi building

It was the summer holiday home of statesman Francesco Paolo Perez, built at the end of the 19th century.

- Giuseppe Pezzillo Orphanage

Large building from the late 19th century, partially remodeled by interventions in the mid-20th century.

- Graveyard

Built to a design by the engineer Mario Umiltà in the years 1934/35 with an extension of 9000 m², it replaced the previous late 18th-century cemetery wanted by the Filangeri princes, which stood in the area now occupied by Giovan Battista Filippo. Basile State Middle School. The monumental entrance with exedra, located on state road 113, shows a courtly layout faithful to the canons of the architecture of the fascist period; in the center of the cemetery stands a circular chapel in gray marble; some interesting tombs and chapels, with architecture, sculptures and decorations in eclectic, liberty and art deco styles. In 1981 the cemetery was expanded.

- Railway station.

Designed by Roberto Narducci in 1932, it presents a language adhering to fascist architecture, lightened in the rational façade with an asymmetrical clock tower. In the square in front, noteworthy is the Monument to Francesco Paolo Perez, a marble bust from the 1910s by the sculptor Francesco Sorgi, placed on a high base with Liberty ribbon friezes.

- Basilica Soluntina di Sant'Anna
- Chiesa di Maria Santissima del Lume – Porticello (church)
- Chiesa di Maria Santissima Addolorata (Sant'Elia) (church)

== Twin towns ==
- Ondarroa, Spain
