= Luca Bassani =

Italian businessman (born 1956)

- Born: 24 November 1956 (age 68)
- Occupation(s): Founder and president of Wally Yachts

Luca Bassani Antivari is the Italian founder and president of the Monaco-based maritime design company Wally Yachts.

== Biography ==
He was born on 24 November 1956 into a wealthy Milanese family. As a child he learnt to sail while staying at their house in Portofino on the Italian Riviera. Later he studied economics at Bocconi University, where he was awarded a Ph.D., before working in his father's electrical supply business.

He formed the Wally Yachts company after having directed the design of a yacht for his own use in 1991. He founded the company headquarters to Monaco in 1994.

== Bibliography ==
- Dan Neil (November 2008). "Sword in the Water". Men's Vogue. Archived from the original on 26 December 2008.
