= Skade (yacht) =

46 m (151 ft) Superyacht

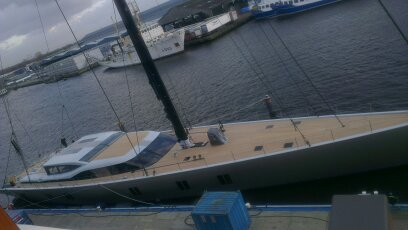
- SY Skade at the Holland Jachtbouw yard

History

Cayman Islands
- Name: Skade
- Builder: Holland Jachtbouw
- Launched: 2016
- In service: 2016
- Identification: IMO number: 9778272; MMSI number: 319093500; Callsign: ZGF02

General characteristics
- Class & type: Sailing yacht
- Tonnage: 271 gross tonnage
- Length: 46 m (151 ft)
- Beam: 9.32 m (30.6 ft)
- Draught: 6.50 m (21.3 ft)
- Speed: 12 knots (22 km/h) (max)
- Capacity: 8 guests
- Crew: 6

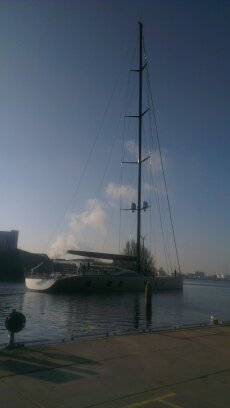
on her way to her sea trials

The 46 m (151 ft) superyacht Skade was launched at the Holland Jachtbouw yard in Zaandam. United States–based Tripp Design Naval Architects designed the exterior of Skade, with interior design by Rhoades Young Design.

== Design ==
Her length is 46 m (151 ft), beam is 9.32 m (30.6 ft) and she has a draught of 6.50 m (21.3 ft). The hull is built out of aluminium as well as the superstructure, with teak laid decks. The yacht is classed by Lloyd's Register and registered in the Cayman Islands. She has a sail area of 3,995m².

== See also ==
- List of large sailing yachts
- Comparison of large sloops
- Luxury yacht
- Holland Jachtbouw
