= 118 WallyPower =

Luxury motor yacht

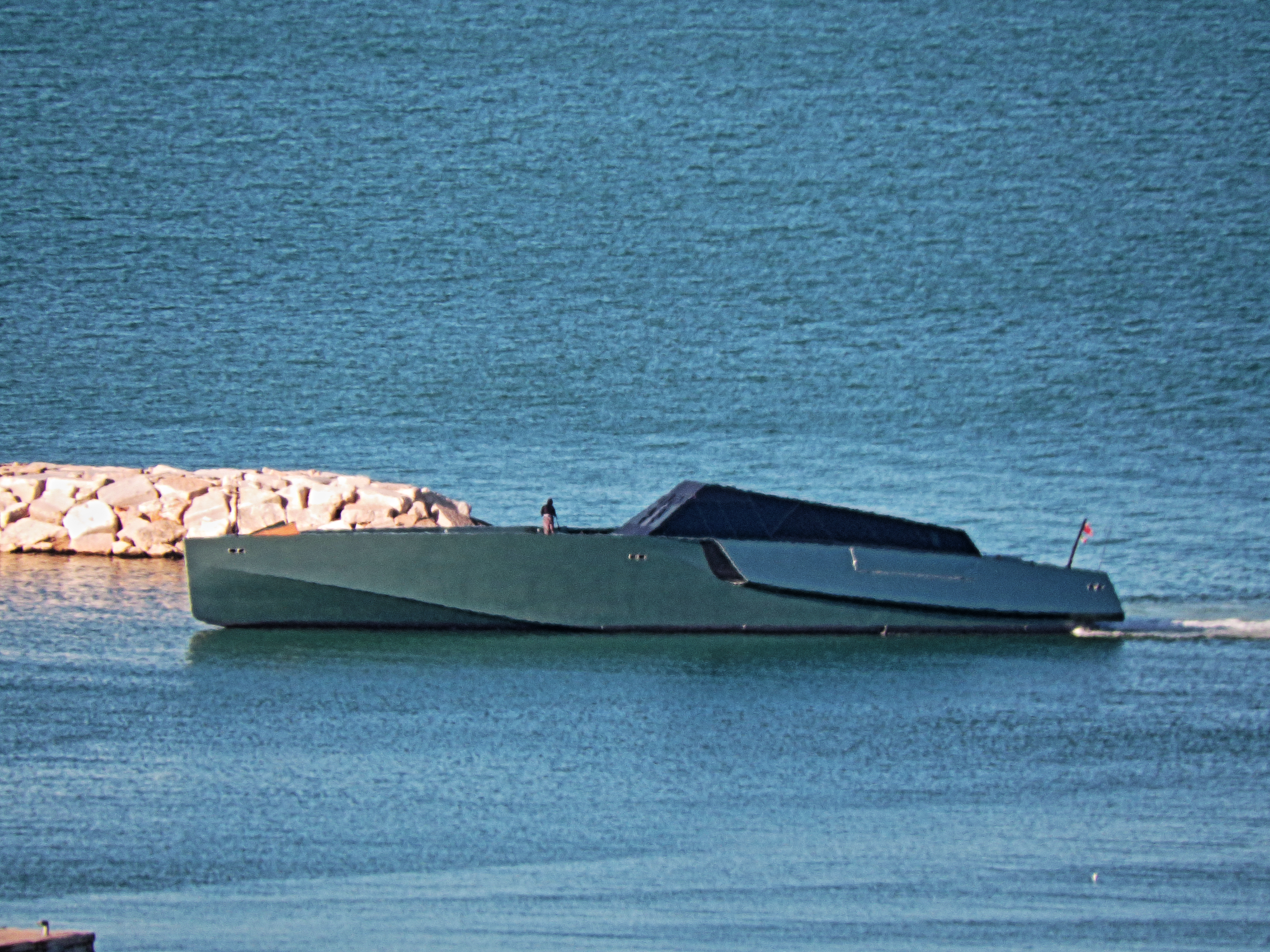
Galeocerdo in 2018

118 WallyPower, christened Galeocerdo, is a 118-foot (36 m) luxury motor yacht with a maximum speed of 60 knots (110 km/h; 69 mph), the exterior was designed by Architect Stefano Pastrovich and Luca Bassani and the interior by Lazzarini Pickering Architetti, produced by Wally Yachts. The yacht is narrow and angular in design with black glass housing, driven by three Vericor TF50 gas turbines generating 5,600 horsepower (4,200 kW), each driving a Rolls-Royce Kamewa water jet, two steerable outboard and a non-steering booster on the centerline. The steerable water jets also have a diesel engine input for a 370 hp (280 kW) Cummins diesel, thus making the ship a combined diesel or gas turbine (CODOG) configured vessel. The total power output is 16,800 horsepower (12,500 kW). One 118 WallyPower has been constructed. It is owned by the Kondakji family and cost £14m.

== Construction ==
The hull of the 118 WallyPower is the result of extensive research and development, including tank testing at the SSPA facility in Gothenburg, Sweden, and smoke testing in the Ferrari Wind Tunnel Facility in Maranello, Italy. It is stable at speed as a result of the deep V (22 degrees) hull shape and a straight stem bow designed to pierce waves.

The air inlets of the gas turbines are optimised to minimise any turbulence and back flow of exhaust gas on deck and living areas. The bottom of the hull is solid fibreglass. The boat's topsides, from the waterline up, are hybrid fibreglass/carbon composite with balsa core. The deck is a Nomex/full carbon composite. The deck superstructure is made of a carbon frame to which glass panels are glued. The glass is composed of Lexan and a triple laminate of glass. The interior bulkheads and cabin soles carry no structural loads, so they are made of thin wood and laminate veneer skins with cores. The bath fixtures and dining tables are made from carbon composites to reduce weight.

The paint finish is metallic dark green, and changes reflections and colour depending on the light and landscape. The deck, cockpit, navigation, dining and saloon areas were designed as one continuous element. The open space incorporates three areas, from stern to bow: the saloon, the dining/seating area, and the navigation cockpit. There is a 360-degree view from the dining area. Underneath the 8-place dining table is a skylight which illuminates the lower corridor. The dining and lounge cockpit is forward of the superstructure for privacy, and away from the heat of engines. Two fore dining tables can be mechanically lowered into place in the bow. The deck of the Wally 118 has a hidden crane and compartment for a tender. The boat also features six plasma screen TVs.

Inside, the owner's stateroom is forward, lighted by a top skylight, and has a king-size bed and side cabinets and his and hers en-suite bathrooms. Two identical guest cabins have queen-size beds and en-suite bathrooms. The stainless steel galley, which includes the crew mess, has an oven, stove, television, and refrigerators.

== Technical specifications ==
The price of the 118 Wallypower is US$33 million for the triple gas turbine version, or $22 million for twin diesels. It has a range of 1,500 nautical miles (2,800 km) at 9 knots (17 km/h), or 300 nautical miles (560 km) at 60 knots (110 km/h). Fuel capacity is 22,000 liters (5800 US gallons). At the maximum speed of 60 knots (110 km/h) the gas turbine uses 15 US gallons / 58 liters of fuel per nautical mile, 900 gallons / 3500 liters per hour. The boat displaces only 95 tons because of the sophisticated building technology that uses a hybrid structure to save weight, and can accommodate six guests and six crew.

== Awards ==
The 118 WallyPower won the Millennium Yacht Design Award, organised by Seatec (the yachting and shipping technology show of Carrarafiere), for the "Layout of the Third Millennium." It was the sole boat in the San Francisco Museum of Modern Art architecture and design exhibition (2004/5), 'Glamour: Fabricating Affluence'.
