= Mediasurface =

Mediasurface Limited (previously known as Webdevelopment Ltd) was a UK-based supplier of content management systems and associated services, founded in February 1996 by Ben Hayman and Steve Hebditch.

Their product, (renamed Morello in 2004) was used for websites and intranets at organisations including Aegon, Borealis, T-Mobile, UK Government Home Office, Citigroup, UK Government Environment Agency and Prudential plc.

== History ==
The company was headquartered in London Bridge until early 2001 when the company moved to a new headquarters in Newbury, UK. Mediasurface floated on the Alternative Investment Market of the London Stock Exchange in August 2004. Mediasurface had international offices in the USA, Netherlands, and Australia.

In April 2005 Mediasurface acquired Silverbullet, a small CMS vendor in the Netherlands. Mediasurface redeveloped and relaunched this CMS as Pepperio in May 2006.

In June 2007 Mediasurface acquired Immediacy, a competing CMS vendor, for approximately £5.6 million.

In January 2008 the Pepperio product was acquired by Purestone (a UK based digital agency)

In July 2008 Mediasurface was acquired by Alterian, a marketing software vendor.

Under the ownership of Alterian the Morello product was renamed Alterian Content Management (ACM)

In 2010 Alterian consolidated to a single CMS platform (ACM) and dropped the Immediacy product.

In January 2012, Alterian was acquired by SDL PLC, a UK-based technology company.
