= Wally Yachts =

Boat manufacturer; yacht brand in Monaco

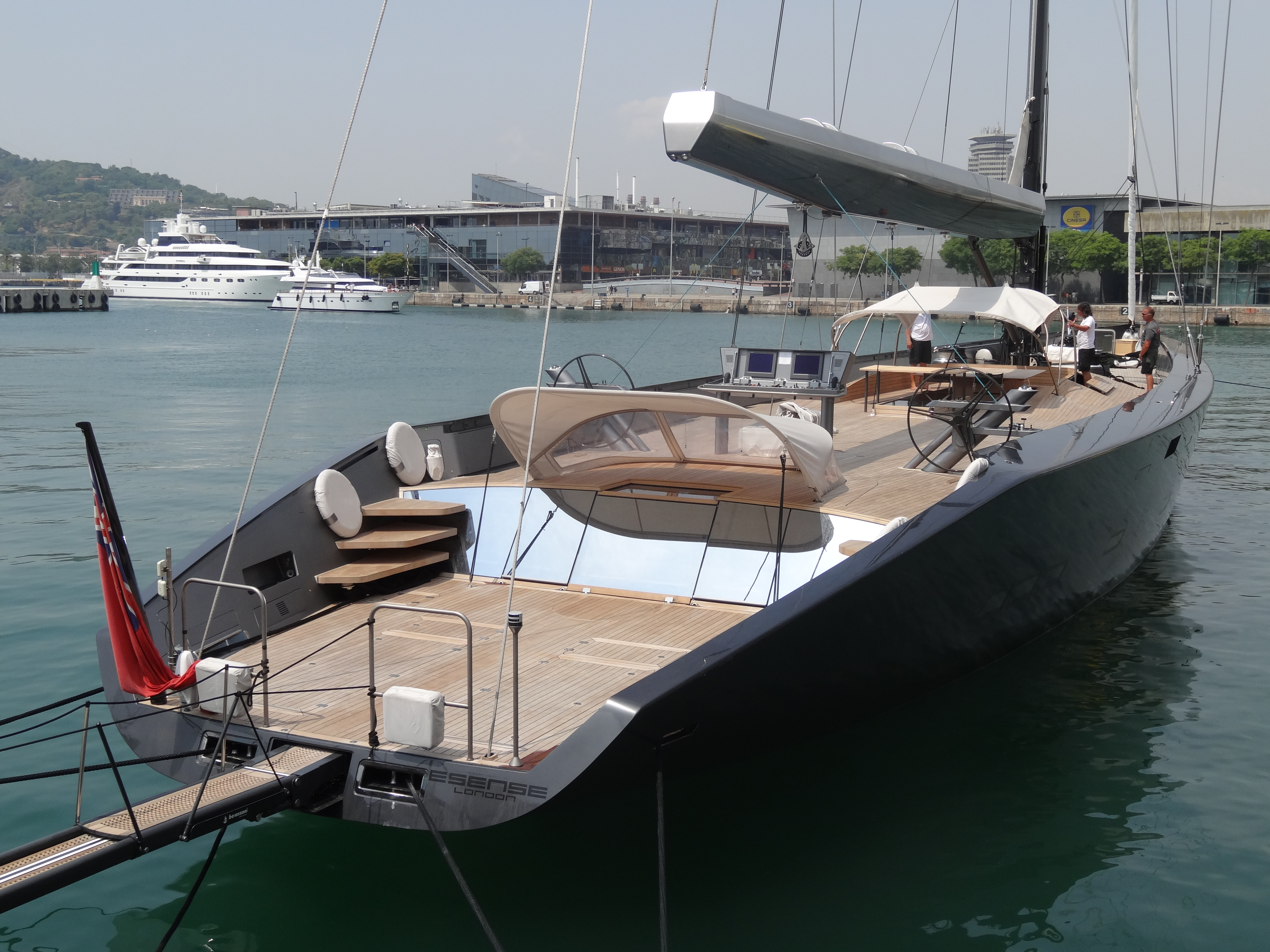
Esense, launched in 2006

Wally Yachts is a yacht brand headquartered in Monaco.

== Company history ==
Founded by Italian entrepreneur Luca Bassani in 1994, Wally started out with sailing boats and then branched out into designing motoryachts, including the 118 WallyPower.

Wally launched sailing yachts ranging from the Wallynano 37 feet (11 m) day sailer to the 166 feet (51 m) flybridge carbonfiber sloop Better Place.

Wally is known for being a pioneer of carbon fiber as a yacht-building material.

On 31 January 2019 Ferretti Group acquired Wally Yachts.

== In film ==
In 2005, the 118 WallyPower was featured in the film The Island, starring Ewan McGregor. The yacht appeared to be a distant memory in the mind of McGregor's character. A 2004 Top Gear UK TV episode also featured the 118 WallyPower.

== See also ==
- List of large sailing yachts
- List of sailboat designers and manufacturers
- WallyIsland
