= Porticello, Sicily =

Coastal village in Sicily, Italy

Porticello
- Frazione or village
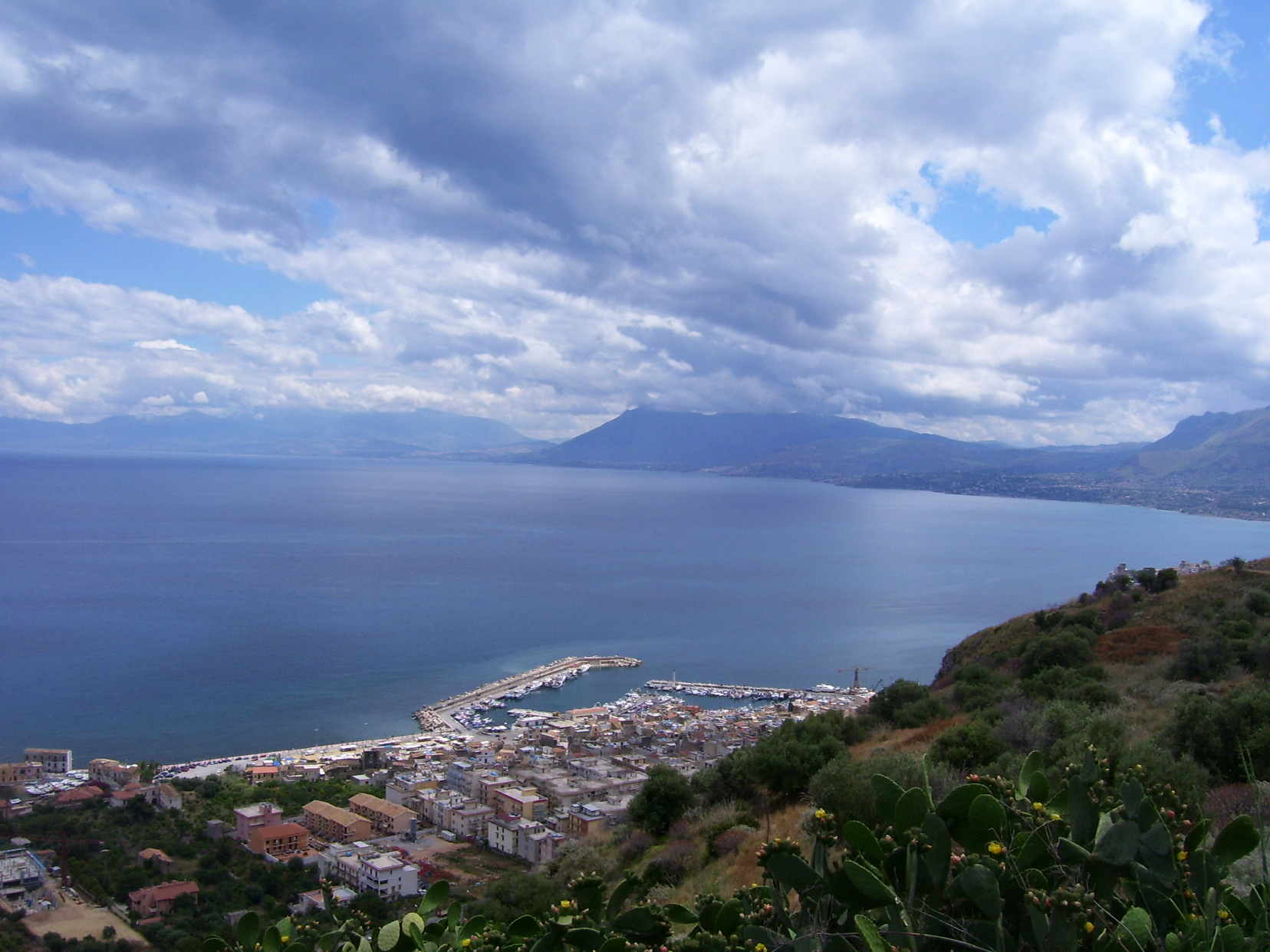
- View of the port at Porticello from above

- Location within Sicily
- Coordinates: 38°5′17.2144″N 13°32′15.3222″E
- Country: Italy
- Island: Sicily
- Metropolitan area: Metropolitan City of Palermo
- Township: Santa Flavia
- Time zone: UTC+1 (CET)

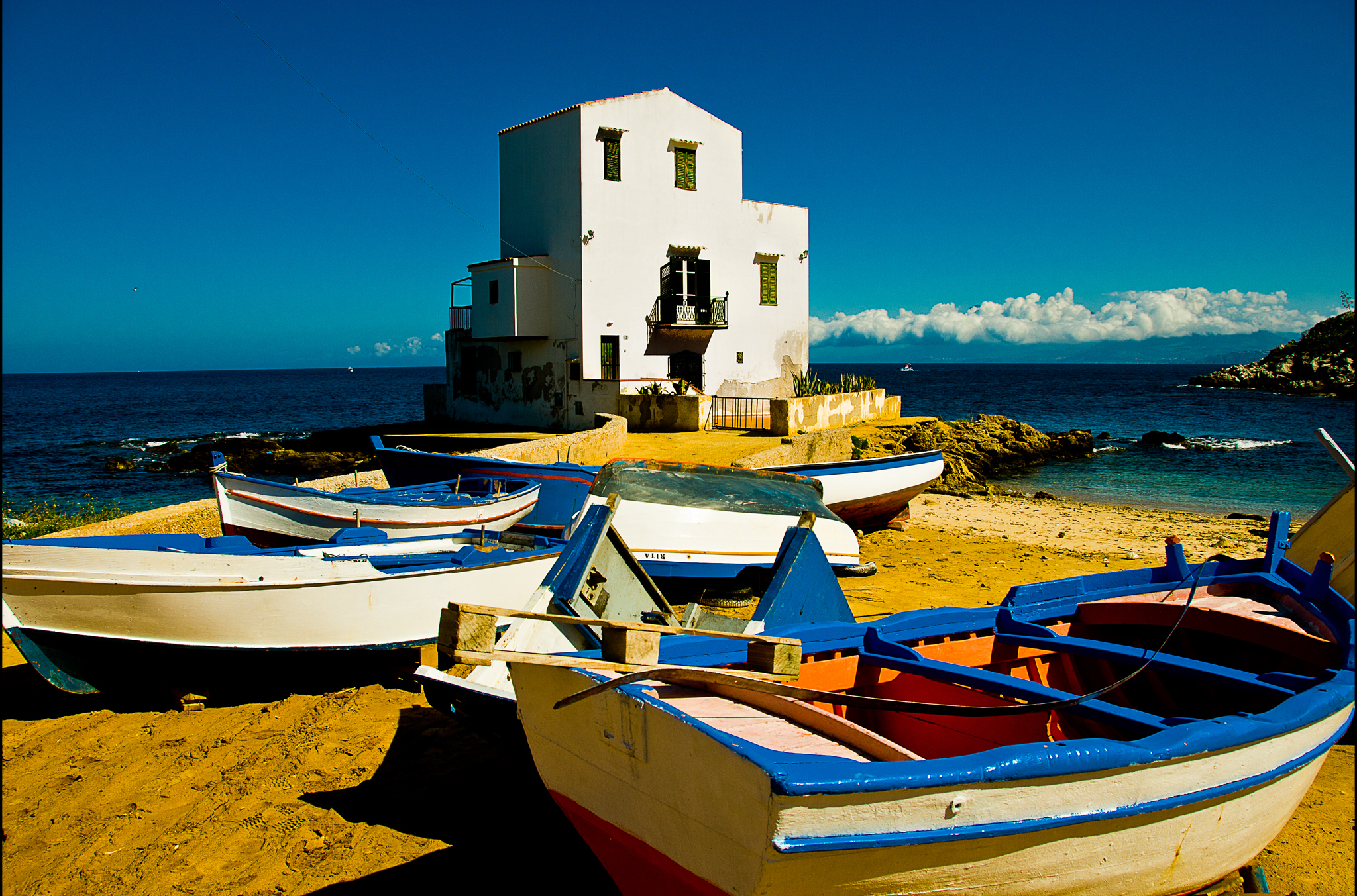
Sea view with boats at Porticello

Porticello is a fishing port in Sicily, Italy, located between Palermo and Cefalu. It is a frazione or village within the township of Santa Flavia.

The village is dominated by the remains of the Punic civilization city of Solunto, one of the first Phoenician trading posts established in Sicily. The city, which had been prosperous until then, was sacked and destroyed in the Middle Ages by the Arabs. The ruins still exist.

In August 2024, a severe storm capsized and sank the Bayesian, a large luxury superyacht owned by the British tech entrepreneur billionaire Mike Lynch, while moored overnight just offshore from Porticello. Lynch, his daughter and five others died.
