= Visual Interactive Voice Response =

Visual Interactive Voice Response (Visual IVR) is conceptually similar to voice Interactive voice response (IVR). Visual IVR uses web applications to "instantly create an app-like experience for users on smartphones during contact center interactions without the need to download any app." The user interacts with a visual interface by touch or click commands on his mobile or computer screen. The technology can be used either on a mobile device app or directly over the web. Visual IVR can be used for companies to interact with their monthly customers, to provide electronic billing and to order other information through a single access point. The user can realize in a few clicks a selfcare journey to find his answer, use another channel made available by the company (email, chatbot, SMS …) or to be put in relation directly with the good skill. Visual IVR has shown advantages over its legacy IVR counterpart, including reducing the average time to resolution by 300 seconds per call, earning a Net Promoter Score of 91 for ease of use, and increasing call containment by 75%. It can overcome inherent challenges in mobile app adoption. Visual IVR can also utilize video as a part of its interface, sometimes referred to as Video IVR. The Interactive Display Response System, which is one form of Visual IVR, was patented in 2009.
