= Fabio Perini =

Italian inventor

Fabio Perini (born 1940) is an Italian entrepreneur and inventor, founder of the machinery company Fabio Perini S.p.A. (1966), Perini Navi shipyard (1983) and Faper Group S.p.A. (2001). He is also Honorary Chairman and founder of Futura S.p.A and founder of the Perini Business Park. He was awarded the Leonardo Qualità Italia award in 2007.

His inventive abilities have allowed him to create world-leading businesses in the fields of boating and engineering based on the innovation nature of his patents.

== Biography ==
Perini was born in Vorno, near Lucca, Tuscany, into a family of paper entrepreneurs.

His entrepreneurial activity started in the paper machinery industry, an important economic sector in Lucca. At the age of 20, in 1960, Fabio Perini patented machinery for automatic cutting of tissue paper.

=== Fabio Perini S.p.A. (1966 - 1994) ===
In 1966 Perini founded in Lucca the Fabio Perini company, a mechanical engineering business specializing in design and manufacturing of industrial machinery for the paper making industry and the tissue converting industry.

The company develops innovative machinery in the paper converting field, achieving growing success which lead it to become, in 1973, a joint-stock company. Fabio Perini S.p.A. expanded to have offices on three continents, a world leader capable of covering 75% of the tissue paper converting machinery market. Starting in the 1970s, abio Perini created an international network of companies: Perini France (1974), Perini Brazil (1975), Perini Deutschland (1976), Perini America (1978), Perini UK (1984), Perini Japan ( 1984), Perini Hong Kong (1985) and Perini Central America (1990).

In 1994 Perini sold the company to the German multinational group Körber PaperLink to devote himself to his business Perini Navi, which he had founded in the 1980s.

=== Perini Navi (1983 - ) ===
In the early eighties Fabio Perini started a new entrepreneurial activity by founding the Perini Navi shipyards with the aim of designing and building large sailing superyachts. Perini invented a system that makes it possible to command large boats (over 40 metres) with small crews. The Perini Navi revolution was based on three principles:

- Automatic control of the sails thanks to the invention of the captive reel winch, a system for winding the sheets and halyards on horizontal drums controlled by electric or hydraulic motors, and equipped with electronic sensors able to perceive excessive load conditions, discharging the wind from the sails and thus protecting boat and crew from potential maneuvering errors
- Internal comfort comparable to that of motor yachts, with large living spaces inside the deckhouse and the entire sleeping area below deck
- Introduction for the first time of a flying bridge on a sailboat, to optimize visibility under sail and allow guests and owner to enjoy open-air navigation

Perini Navi has launched 52 ships since 1983, becoming the world's leading company in the design and construction of large luxury sailing ships (ketch and sloop) (63% of the world market of the 40+ in 2002).

In May 2017, the Tabacchi family joined Perini Navi and assumed its operational and strategic management, as well as full ownership.

In 2021 Perini Navi went bankrupt. It was bought by The Italian Sea Group for €80M after two other companies declined to pay €62.5M, deeming it overpriced.

=== Perini Business Park (1999 - ) ===
In Joinville, Brazil, Fabio Perini launched the Perini Business Park, the largest technological-industrial park in South America. To start his new project, he founded Perville, a construction company that will follow the construction of the Perini Park.

=== Faper Group S.p.A. (2001 - ) ===
Faper Group was founded by Fabio Perini in 2001 and operates from headquarters in Viareggio. Born as an aggregator reference for the innovative tissue mechanics sector, today it specializes in engineering solutions for tissue paper, sterilization systems and real-estate. It has been led by CEO Fabio Boschi since 2009.

=== Futura Converting (2003 - ) ===
In 2003 Fabio Perini, after having sold the company of the same name to the German Körber, restarted in the sector of industrial machines for tissue with a new engineering company, created the new engineering company Futura. The company developed patents that allow it to produce innovative machinery, becoming one of the leading companies in the sector under the guidance of Perini.

Today, Futura together with Picchiotti and Cisa is part of the Faper Group.

== Awards and honours ==
- Order of Merit for Labour (1991)
- Superyacht Society Award for Leadership (2004)
- Capital Entrepreneur of the year (2007)
- Italian Quality Committee - Leonardo Award (2007)
