= Rémi Tessier =

French interior designer (born 1964)

- Born: January 2, 1965 (age 61); Paris, France
- Occupation: Interior designer
- Known for: Private superyachts
- Website: www.remi-tessier.com

Rémi Tessier (born 1964) is a French interior designer specializing in private superyachts, luxury residences and aircraft interiors. Based in Paris, he founded his own studio in 1988 and has worked internationally since. His yacht projects include Parsifal III (2005), Nahlin (2010), Vava II (2012) and Grace E (2014).

== Early life and training ==
Tessier was born in Paris in 1964 and grew up in Saint-Étienne. He trained as a cabinetmaker and in 1979 joined the Compagnons du Devoir, the French guild of craftsmen, where he completed an eight-year apprenticeship, moving between workshops every six months. He founded his own studio in 1988.

== Career ==
Tessier's early work focused on retail and residential interiors, including projects in Lyon, Geneva and Saint-Tropez. In April 2002, he opened the Galerie Saint-Père at 19 rue des Saints-Pères in the 6th arrondissement of Paris, an exhibition space devoted to design and the visual arts.

In 2000, Tessier relocated his studio to Paris and was commissioned to design the interior of the 52-metre ketch Squall, marking his transition toward yacht interior design. Based in Paris, his studio has since designed interiors for more than twenty yachts, alongside residential projects in Europe and the United States and several private aircraft, including a Boeing 787 delivered in 2022. By that date, the studio employed about fifteen people and was working on roughly twenty projects simultaneously.

In September 2025, Tessier was sued by a longtime client, Jan Koum, alleging a "pattern of predation" related to a series of projects Tessier did for Koum. Koum alleged that Tessier misrepresented the value and origin of objects, and took kickbacks from third parties for items he procured. The case was settled confidentially in February 2026.

=== Notable yacht projects ===
Yacht	Year	Length	Builder	Awards
Parsifal III	2005	54 m (177 ft)	Perini Navi	Sailing Yacht of the Year and Best Interior Design – Sail Yacht, World Superyacht Awards 2006; Best Sailing Yacht Interior, ShowBoats Award 2006
Nahlin	2010	91 m (299 ft)	John Brown & Company	
Vava II	2012	96 m (315 ft)	Devonport Yachts	
Grace E	2014	73 m (240 ft)	Perini Navi	Motor Yacht of the Year, World Superyacht Awards 2015; Baccarat Trophy for Interiors, Monaco Yacht Show 2014; Best Interior Design (Motor Yacht over 500 GT), ShowBoats Design Awards 2015
Bayesian	2008	56 m (184 ft)	Perini Navi	Best Interior, International Superyacht Society Awards 2008

Bayesian, originally launched as Salute in February 2008, was a 56-metre Perini Navi sloop and Tessier's third collaboration with the Italian shipyard. The interior, by Tessier's studio, drew on a Japanese-influenced aesthetic. The yacht sank during a storm off the coast of Porticello, Sicily, on 19 August 2024.

=== Projects on land ===
Aside from yachts, Tessier has worked for the Maybourne Hotel Group in hospitality. He designed the glass penthouse at Claridge's in London, profiled by the Financial Times in 2024. At The Emory, the Knightsbridge hotel designed by Richard Rogers that opened in 2024, Tessier designed the principal common spaces, including the abc kitchens restaurant by Jean-Georges Vongerichten, the rooftop Bar 33 and Cigar Merchants, and the Surrenne wellness center. He also designed the Cédric Grolet boutique and tea salon at The Berkeley, which opened on 14 February 2022.

A private residential project in Palm Beach, Florida by Tessier was featured in Architectural Digest. His design approach has also been featured in AD Magazine.

== Personal ==
He is married to Carole Tessier, also a designer.
