= Estimates of victims of the Volhynia and Eastern Galicia massacres =

This list shows the estimates of the number of casualties in the mutual massacres between Poles and Ukrainian Insurgent Army (UPA).

= Historian	= Political science	= Research group

Estimates of casualties, Poles killed by Ukrainians
Author	Volhynia	Galicia	VOL+GAL	E. Poland	V+G+EP	Quotes / Sources / Notes
Timothy Snyder	50k	—	—		—	"Ukrainian partisans killed about fifty thousand Volhynian Poles and forced tens of thousands more to flee in 1943."
Timothy Snyder	>40k	10k	—	—	—	>40k in July '43, 10k is in March '44.
Timothy Snyder	40-60k	25k	—	5k	—	"UPA killed forty to sixty thousand Polish Civilians in Volhynia in 1943." "This apparent change, ..., limited the death toll of Polish civilians to about twenty-five thousand in Galicia." "All told, in the Lublin and Rzeszow regions, Poles and Ukrainians killed about five thousand of the other's civilians in 1943-44."
Timothy Snyder	—	5–10k	—	—	—	"Throughout spring 1944 [...] Polish preparations and Ukrainian warnings limited the deaths to perhaps 5,000–10,000"
Grzegorz Motyka	40-60k	—	—	6-8k	80-100k	net is from '43 to '47.
Grzegorz Motyka	40-60k	30-40k	—	6-8k	100k	
Ivan Katchanovski	35-60k	—	—		—	Katchanovski considers the lower bound 35k to be more likely; cited Snyder (1999), Hryciuk (2001).
Grzegorz Hryciuk	35-60k	—	—		—	Cited by Katchanovski (2010), p. 7.
Grzegorz Hryciuk	35.7-60k	—	—	—	—	(Note: Hryciuk writes (quote): "Dotychczasowe ustalenia zdają się świadczyć, że straty bezpowrotne ludności polskiej na Wołyniu w latach 1941-1944 wynieść mogły 70 tys. osób, z czego około 35,7 do 60 tys. przypadałoby na polskie ofiary ukraińskiej "czystki etnicznej".") Cited by Kalischuk.
Grzegorz Hryciuk	—	20–24k	—	—	—	(Note: Hryciuk writes (quote): "Po uwzględnieniu tej dokumentacji, a także informacji zaczerpniętych z powojennych relacji i wspomnień polskich mieszkańców Galicji Wschodniej, wstępny bilans strat polskich poniesionych w wyniku akcji nacjonalistycznych oddziałów ukraińskich w latach 1941-45 mógłby wynosić 20-25 tys. ofiar. Jak się wydaje, ogólna liczba strat ludności polskiej w 1941 roku nie przekroczyła zapewne 500-1000 osób. W latach 1943-1946 można ją szacować na około 20-24 tys. osób") Cited by Kalischuk; from 43 to 46; 8820 in '43-mid'44; "according to relevant contemporary Polish sources".
Grzegorz Hryciuk	35.7-60k	20-24k	—	—	—	(Note: Hryciuk writes (quote): "Odwołując się do wyrywkowej i często niekompletnej dokumentacji polskiej, ukraińskiej i radzieckiej, uwzględniając także informacje zaczerpnięte z powojennych relacji i wspomnień polskich mieszkańców Galicji Wschodniej wstępny bilans strat polskich poniesionych w wyniku akcji nacjonalistycznych oddziałów ukraińskich na tym obszarze określić można w latach 1941-1946 na 20-25 tys. ofiar, z tego w 1943 r. - do około 2 tys., w 1944 r. 13-16 tys., 1945-1946 – 5-6 tys.; 3-3,5 tys. w woj. stanisławowskim, 5-6 tys. w woj. lwowskim i najwięcej - 12 do 15 tys. w woj. tarnopolskim.") For Eastern Galicia "primary balance" relied on "fragmentary and often incomplete documentation" and witnesses' testimonies; 20-25k in 1941-1946 and 20-24k in 1943-1946.
Paul Robert Magocsi	—	—	—	—	50k	"among the more reasonable estimates"
Niall Ferguson	—	—	60-80k		—	Fergusson is citing other authors (which ones?)
John Paul Himka	—	—	(Note: "tens of thousands")		—	"One of the things that emerged clearly from this discussion was that UPA and OUN were responsible for the murder of tens of thousands of Poles in Western Ukraine."
Per Anders Rudling	40-70k	—	—	7k		"Most mainstream estimates give the number of Volhynian Polish victims [...] as 40,000–70,000, [...] In Poland, [...] with 7,000 Poles [killed]."
Grzegorz Rossoliński-Liebe	—	—	70-100k	—	—	
Ewa Siemaszko	60k	70k	130k		133k	According to Rudling, this is the most extensive study of the Polish casualties.
Marek Jasiak	—	—	—		60-70k	"In Podole, Volhynia, and Lublin".
Mikolaj Terles		50k	60-70k	100-200k	—	
KARTA	35k	29.8k	—	6.5k	—	KARTA based mostly on: Siemaszko for Volhynia (documented number) and Czesław Blicharski for Tarnopol voivodsh. Cited by Kalishchuk: here
Kataryna Wolczuk	—	—	—		60-100k	Cited by Marples.
Common communicate of PL and UKR historians.	50-60k	20-25k	—	5-6k		"Polish casualties acc. to Polish sources"
Ryszard Torzecki	30-40k	30-40k		10-20k	80-100k	
IPN	60-80k	—	—		—	"It is estimated that about 60, or even 80 thousand people of Polish nationality were murdered in Volhynia."
Norman Davies	—	—	—		(Note: "hundreds of thousands")	Estimate includes both Poles and Ukrainians killed by UPA.
Czesław Partacz	—	—	—		134-200k	
Lucyna Kulińska	—	—	—		150-200k	
Anna M. Cienciala	—	—	40-60k			"During WWII, the Bandera faction of the Ukrainian Insurrectionary Army (UPA) murdered 40,000–60,000 Poles living in the villages of former Volhynia and former East Galicia."
Pertti Ahonen, et al.		—	—	—	100k	"The ethnic cleansing conducted by Ukrainian nationalists, discussed in chapter 2, killed about 100,000 Poles and made refugees out of another 300,000."
George Liber	25-70k	20-70k	50-100k		—	"Scholars in Poland, Ukraine, the United States, and Europe estimate that in 1943 and 1944 the members of the OUN-B and UPA killed between 25,000 to 70,000 Poles in Western Volhynia, and then another 20,000 to 70,000 in Eastern Galicia... between 50,000 to 100,000 Poles... died by violent means."

Table notes:

Estimates of casualties, Ukrainians killed by Poles
Author	Volhynia	Galicia	VOL+GAL	E. Poland	V+G+EP	Quotes / Sources / Notes
Grzegorz Motyka	2-3k	—	—	8-12k	10-20k	1943–1947, The number for total includes those killed in Volhynia, Galicia, territories of present-day (eastern) Poland.
Grzegorz Motyka	2-3k	1-2k	—	8-10k	11-15k	1943–1947; According to Motyka, numbers of Ukrainian casualties from hands of Poles >= 30k are "simply pulled out of thin air".
Per Anders Rudling	20k	—		11k		"Most mainstream estimates give the number of Volhynian Polish victims [...] compared with some 20,000 Ukrainians killed by Polish forces. In Poland, the situation was the reverse, with some 11,000 Ukrainians killed, [...]"
Paul Robert Magocsi	—	—	—		20k	"among the more reasonable estimates"
Timothy Snyder	10k	—	—			"Over the course of 1943, perhaps ten thousand Ukrainian civilians were killed by Polish self-defence units, Soviet partisans, and German police."
Timothy Snyder	—	—	—	about 5k		"All told, in the Lublin and Rzeszow regions, Poles and Ukrainians killed about five thousand of the other's civilians in 1943–44."
Grzegorz Rossoliński-Liebe	—	—	—	—	10-20k	"Poles were fully responsible for killing between 10,000 and 20,000 Ukrainians (both OUN-UPA members and civilians) during and after World War II."
Kataryna Wolczuk	—	—	15-30k			Cited by Marples.
Katrina Witt	—	—	15-30k			Cited Marples (2007), pp. 222–223, who cites Wolczuk.
KARTA	unknown	unknown	—	7.5k		Cited by Kalishchuk: here
L. Zashkilniak and M. Krykun	—	—	35k			Cited by Kalishchuk.
Anna M. Cienciala	—	—	—	—	20k	"... the Poles killed some 20,000 Ukrainians, mostly in former East Galicia in reprisal."
George Liber	2-20k	1-4k	8-20k		—	"In [1943–44], the Home Army and other Polish underground units killed 2,000 to 20,000 Ukrainians in Western Volhynia and another 1,000 to 4,000 in Galicia."

== Sources ==
- Ahonen, Pertti; Corni, Gustavo; Kochanowski, Jerzy; Schulze, Rainer; Stark, Tamás; Stelzl-Marx, Barbara (2008). People on the Move: Population Transfers and Ethnic Cleansing Policies During World War II and Its Aftermath. Berg Publishers.
- Cienciala, Anna M. (Spring 2002) [(Revised Fall 2007. Spring 2012)]. "The Rebirth of Poland". History 557 Lecture Notes. University of Kansas.
- Davies, Norman (2005). God's Playground A History of Poland: Volume II: 1795 to the Present. Oxford: Oxford University Press. ISBN 9780199253401 – via Google Books.
- Ferguson, Niall (2006). The War of the World: Twentieth-Century Conflict and the Descent of the West. New York: Penguin Press. ISBN 9781594201004.
- Himka, John-Paul (2010). "The Organization of Ukrainian Nationalists and the Ukrainian Insurgent Army: Unwelcome Elements of an Identity Project". Ab Imperio. 2010 (4): 83–101. doi:10.1353/imp.2010.0101. S2CID 130590374.
- Hryciuk, Grzegorz (2001). "Vtraty naselennia na Volyni u 1941-1944rr". Ukraina-Polshcha: Vazhki Pytannia. Vol. 5. Warsaw: Tyrsa. pp. 249–270.
- Hryciuk, Grzegorz (2005). Przemiany narodowosciowe i ludnosciowe w Galicji Wschodniej i na Wolyniu w latach 1931–1948. Torun: Adam Marszalek Publishing House.
- Jasiak, Marek (2001). "Overcoming Ukrainian Resistance: The Deportation of Ukrainians within Poland in 1947". In Siljak, Ana; Ther, Philipp (eds.). Redrawing Nations. Ethnic Cleansing in East-Central Europe, 1944-1948. Harvard Cold War studies book series. Blue Ridge Summit: Rowman & Littlefield Publishers. pp. 173–194. ISBN 9781461642985.
- Katchanovski, Ivan (2010). Terrorists or National Heroes? Politics of the OUN and the UPA in Ukraine. Annual Conference of the Canadian Political Science Association, Montreal, June 1-3, 2010.
- Kulińska, Lucyna (2009). Dzieci Kresów III. Jagiellonia. ISBN 9788385729761.
- Liber, George (2016). Total wars and the making of modern Ukraine, 1914-1954. Toronto: University of Toronto Press. ISBN 9781442649774.
- Magocsi, Paul Robert (2010). A History of Ukraine: the land and its peoples (2nd ed.). Toronto: University of Toronto Press. ISBN 9781442640856.
- Marples, David (2007). Heroes and Villains: Creating National History in Contemporary Ukraine. Budapest, New York: Central European Press.
- Motyka, Grzegorz (2009). W kręgu "Łun w Bieszczadach". Szkice z najnowszej historii polskich Bieszczad [In the circle of "Lun in the Bieszczady Mountains". Sketches from the Latest History of the Polish Bieszczady Mountains] (in Polish). Warszawa: "Rytm" Publishing House. ISBN 978-83-7399-340-2.
- Motyka, Grzegorz (2011). Od rzezi wołyńskiej do Akcji "Wisła": konflikt polsko-ukraiński 1943-1947 (in Polish). Kraków: Wydawnictwo Literackie. ISBN 9788308045763.
- Niedzielko, Romuald, ed. (2000a). Polska-Ukraina: trudne pytania [Poland-Ukraine: difficult questions] (in Polish). Vol. 6 (1st ed.). Warszawa: Ośrodek KARTA. ISBN 83-908944-7-5.
- Niedzielko, Romuald, ed. (2000b). Polska-Ukraina: trudne pytania [Poland-Ukraine: difficult questions] (in Polish). Vol. 7. Translated by Buczo, Maria; Misiło, Eugeniusz (1st ed.). Warszawa: Ośrodek KARTA. ISBN 83-908944-9-1.
- Niedzielko, Romuald, ed. (2002). Polska-Ukraina: trudne pytania [Poland-Ukraine: difficult questions] (in Polish). Vol. 9 (1st ed.). Warszawa: KARTA. ISBN 83-915111-5-4.
- Partacz, Czesław (2011). "Przemilczane w ukraińskiej historiografii przyczyny ludobójstwa popełnionego przez OUN-UPA na ludności polskiej". In Paź, Bogusław (ed.). Prawda historyczna na prawda polityczna w badaniach naukowych. Przykład ludobójstwa na Kresach Południowo-Wschodniej Polski w latach 1939–1946 [Historical Truth and Political Truth in the Scientific Research. The Genocide on the South Eastern Polish Borderland in 1939-1946] (in Polish). Wrocław: Wydawnictwo Uniwersytetu Wrocławskiego. ISBN 9788322931851.
- Rossoliński-Liebe, Grzegorz (2010). "Celebrating Fascism and War Criminality in Edmonton. The Political Myth and Cult of Stepan Bandera in Multicultural Canada" (PDF). Kakanien Revisited. 12: 1–16.
- Rossoliński-Liebe, Grzegorz (2011). "The "Ukrainian National Revolution" of 1941: Discourse and Practice of a Fascist Movement". Kritika: Explorations in Russian and Eurasian History. 12 (1): 83–114. doi:10.1353/kri.2011.a411661 – via Project MUSE.
- Rudling, Per Anders (December 2006). "Theory and Practice: Historical Representation of the War Time Activities of the OUN-UPA (the Organization of Ukrainian Nationalists - the Ukrainian Insurgent Army)". East European Jewish Affairs. 36 (2): 163–189. doi:10.1080/13501670600983008.
- Rudling, Per Anders (2011). "The OUN, the UPA and the Holocaust: A Study in the Manufacturing of Historical Myths". The Carl Beck Papers in Russian and East European Studies (2107). Pittsburgh: University Center for Russian and East European Studies. doi:10.5195/CBP.2011.164. #2107.
- Siemaszko, Ewa (2010). "Bilans zbrodni". Biuletyn Instytutu Pamięci Narodowej (7–8). Instytut Pamięci Narodowej. Archived from the original on 2011-07-28.
- Snyder, Timothy (1999). ""To Resolve the Ukrainian Problem Once and for All": The Ethnic Cleansing of Ukrainians in Poland, 1943-1947". Journal of Cold War Studies. 1 (2): 86–120. doi:10.1162/15203979952559531.
- Snyder, Timothy (November 2001). "To Resolve the Ukrainian Question Once and For All: The Ethnic Cleansing of Ukrainians in Poland, 1943–1947" (PDF). Working Paper: 1–28. #9.
- Snyder, Timothy (2002). "Poland, Lithuania and Ukraine, 1939–1999". In Jan-Werner Müller (ed.). Memory and Power in Post-War Europe. Cambridge University Press. ISBN 052100070X.
- Snyder, Timothy (2003). The Reconstruction of Nations. Yale University Press. ISBN 9780300128413.
- Snyder, Timothy (May 2003a). "The Causes of Ukrainian-Polish Ethnic Cleansing 1943". Past and Present (179): 197–234. JSTOR 3600827.
- Terles, Mikolaj (1993). Ethnic Cleansing of Poles in Volhynia and Eastern Galicia, 1942-1946. Alliance of the Polish Eastern Provinces. ISBN 9780969802006.
- Torzecki, Ryszard (1993). Polacy i Ukraińcy. Sprawa ukraińska podczas II wojny światowej na terenie II Rzeczypospolitej [Poles and Ukrainians: the Ukrainian issue during World War II in the Second Polish Republic] (in Polish) (1st ed.). Warszawa: Wydawn. Nauk. PWN.
- Witt, Katrina (April 2010). "Ukrainian Memory and Victimhood. Narratives after the Second World War". Constellations. 1 (2): 96–109. doi:10.29173/cons8055.
- Zashkilniak, L.; Krykun, M. (2002). Istorii︠a︡ Polʹshchi: vid naĭdavnishykh chasiv do nashykh dniv [History of Poland: from ancient times to the present day] (in Ukrainian). Lʹviv: Lʹvivsʹkyĭ nat︠s︡ionalʹnyĭ universytet im. Ivana Franka.
