= Körber Foundation =

German nonprofit organization

- Founded: 1959; 67 years ago
- Founders: Kurt A. Körber
- Type: Nonprofit
- Headquarters: Hamburg, Germany
- Key people: Thomas Paulsen (chairman); Eva Nemela
- Website: koerber-stiftung.de

The Körber Foundation (German: Körber-Stiftung) is a nonprofit organization, established in 1959 by German businessman Kurt A. Körber. Its operational work is organised into seven subject areas: 'Age and Demography', 'Education', 'Democracy and Cohesion', 'History and Politics', 'International Politics', 'Culture' and 'Science'. The foundation is nationally and internationally active with its own projects and events at its locations in Hamburg's Hafencity, Bergedorf and Berlin.

The foundation is a corporate investment foundation: it is the sole shareholder of Körber AG, the strategic holding company of the Körber Group. It receives an annual dividend from its investment, which it uses exclusively for charitable purposes. The foundation's assets amount to around 580 million euros, of which 556 million euros is equity.

In 2025, the foundation was listed as an undesirable organization in Russia.

== Committees ==
The foundation has an executive board, a foundation board and a board of trustees. The executive board is responsible for fulfilling the objectives of the statutes through operational work and funding. The members of the executive board are Thomas Paulsen, as chairman, and Eva Nemela. The foundation board has the task of monitoring the charitable activities of the executive board. The Board of Trustees monitors the foundation's asset management and decides on the exercise of rights in companies in which the foundation holds more than 20 per cent of the capital.

== Activities ==
The Körber Foundation has an annual budget of around €26 million for its operational projects.

The foundation is involved in the fields of vibrant civil society, knowledge for tomorrow and international understanding. It is divided into eleven departments:

- Age and demography
- Education
- Democracy and cohesion
- History and politics
- International politics
- Culture
- Science
- Communication
- Assets, administration and IT
- Personnel

More than 40 projects and activities are carried out operationally. These are organised by field of activity. A partial list is as follows:

Vibrant civil society

- Ageing with Tech: The annual conference brings together stakeholders from relevant sectors and addresses current technology trends and debates around age-appropriate digitalisation.
- Logged in: During Eingeloggt (Logged in) Week, the Körber Foundation offers events to promote digitalisation of older people.
- Engagierte Stadt: The network Engagierte Stadt (A Committed City), which is supported by five foundations, a company and the Federal Ministry for Family Affairs, and is based in the foundation, aims to strengthen the municipal infrastructure for engagement. Founded in 2015, the network had over 100 member cities as of 2021.
- Exile Media Forum: Once a year, the Körber Foundation invites more than 100 media professionals in exile, representatives from politics and aid organisations to Hamburg to discuss future issues, exchange experiences and network.
- Körber Demography Symposium: The Körber Demography Symposium invites everyone who bears responsibility for the issues of demographic change to be inspired by new ideas from national and international thought leaders and proven good practice projects.
- Strong in office: In response to an increasing number of insults, threats or attacks against people who take on political responsibility for their community, the online portal Stark im Amt (Strong in Office), launched in April 2021 in cooperation with Deutscher Städtetag, Deutscher Landkreistag, and German Association of Towns and Municipalities, offers support to local officials and elected representatives in Germany.
- Days of Exile: The event series Tage des Exils (Days of Exile), held in Hamburg, gives exiles an opportunity to present themselves and their art to a wider audience.
- Encore Prize: The Encore Prize honours social entrepreneurs aged 60 and up who have found solutions to the social challenges of our time with an entrepreneurial spirit and have built an organisation to address them.

Knowledge for tomorrow

- German Thesis Award: The Körber Foundation honours the best doctoral graduates in all disciplines with the German Thesis Award. The social significance of the research is what counts most.
- Hamburg Science Summit: At the Hamburg Science Summit, leading minds from science, politics, business and NGOs discuss the necessary framework conditions for Europe as a centre of research and innovation.
- Körber European Science Prize: The Körber European Science Prize is awarded annually to outstanding individual scientists working in Europe for their innovative and promising research work. With prize money of one million euros, the Körber Foundation honours application-oriented research in the life and physical sciences.
- MINTvernetzt: The MINT-Vernetzungsstelle is the umbrella organisation for extracurricular MINT education in Germany. It supports committed individuals in MINT education by providing networking and transfer opportunities to help them provide even better educational opportunities for children and young people, while also addressing broader and more diverse target groups.
- Young Science Hamburg: At Young Science Hamburg, research-loving school students work together to develop ideas and research questions and implement their projects.

International Understanding

- Bergedorf Round Table: Since 1961, high-ranking international politicians and experts have been discussing fundamental issues of German and European foreign policy in small and confidential groups.
- Berlin Forum Außenpolitik: Since its founding in 2011, the Berlin Forum on Foreign Policy has become the leading foreign policy conference in Berlin.
- EUSTORY: The EUSTORY network connects civil society organisations from over 20 countries that run national history competitions.
- History Competition of the Federal President: In Germany's largest historical research competition, children and young people research history independently on site.
- Körber History Forum: This international conference, held annually in Berlin, focuses on current conflicts and political challenges in the context of their historical background.
- Körber Network Foreign Policy: The Körber Network Foreign Policy, based in Berlin, offers a fixed group of young foreign policy experts the opportunity to engage in dialogue with each other and with international actors.
- Memorial: With the special project Zukunft MEMORIAL, the Körber Foundation supports its partner MEMORIAL International, which was liquidated in Russia in 2022, in building a new organisation in German exile
- Munich Young Leaders: The Munich Young Leaders are a joint project of the Körber Foundation and the Munich Security Conference that offers tomorrow's decision-makers a platform to introduce new ideas into the foreign and security policy discourse and to strengthen their international networks.

Cultural impulses for Hamburg

- Boy-Gobert Prize: Since 1981, the foundation has awarded the Boy-Gobert Prize, worth €10,000, to young actors on Hamburg's stages.
- International Opera Studio at the Hamburg State Opera: The International Opera Studio offers young singers the opportunity to supplement and complete their training under real-life theatre conditions.
- Körber Studio Junge Regie: Together with the Thalia Theater Hamburg and the Theaterakademie Hamburg, the foundation has been organising a festival for young German-speaking directors since 2003.
- The Art of Music Education: Initiated in 2008 and co-hosted with Elbphilharmonie, The Art of Music Education (TAOME) is a series of international symposia on the future of concert halls. The ninth edition was held in 2024.

Körber Start-Hub

Since December 2023, the foundation has been operating the Körber Start-Hub, an incubator and co-working space for young start-ups and founders. At the opening of the Start-Hub, the foundation launched the associated NextGeneration Incubator Programme, which supports several young start-ups per year with a content-based programme and awards one of the teams 50,000 euros.

Communication

The foundation publishes studies every year to communicate the impulses and suggestions of the foundation's work to the public. The Berlin Pulse, an annual survey, captures the foreign policy attitudes of Germans, the study Parents in Focus takes a look at satisfaction with the German school system, and the annually recurring representative survey Democracy in Crisis asks the population about their attitude towards German democracy.

In addition, the Körber Foundation produces the podcasts History is Present!, Listen to Knowledge, Better Society and Future Changers. At the KörberForum in Hamburg's Hafencity and the KörberHaus in Hamburg-Bergedorf, the foundation hosts around 100 free events a year that address current social issues.

== Criticism ==
Connections between Körber Foundation and politics have been described as too close by some media. A history contest for children, youths, and young adults, organized by the foundation, has been under the patronage of the President of Germany. According to critics, such connections violate guidelines of the WHO Framework Convention on Tobacco Control regarding the relations between governments and the tobacco industry, as the Körber AG owned by the Körber Foundation is one of the largest producers of tobacco making machines globally. Critics saw the philanthropic efforts of the tobacco industry as a key reason for why they were able to maintain a generally positive public image in Germany, notwithstanding the harmful effects of tobacco consumption on society. In 2015, the foundation published a statement that denied any connections between its activities and the business areas in which Körber AG operated, and said that it was not attempting to negate the negative effects of tobacco consumption.
