= Kuliński =

Kuliński (feminine: Kulińska; plural: Kulińscy) is a Polish surname. Notable people with the surname include:

- Kyle Kulinski (born 1988), American political commentator
- Lucyna Kulińska (born 1955), Polish historian

== See also ==
- Kulinsky District
