= Nautilus (yacht) =

Turkish yacht

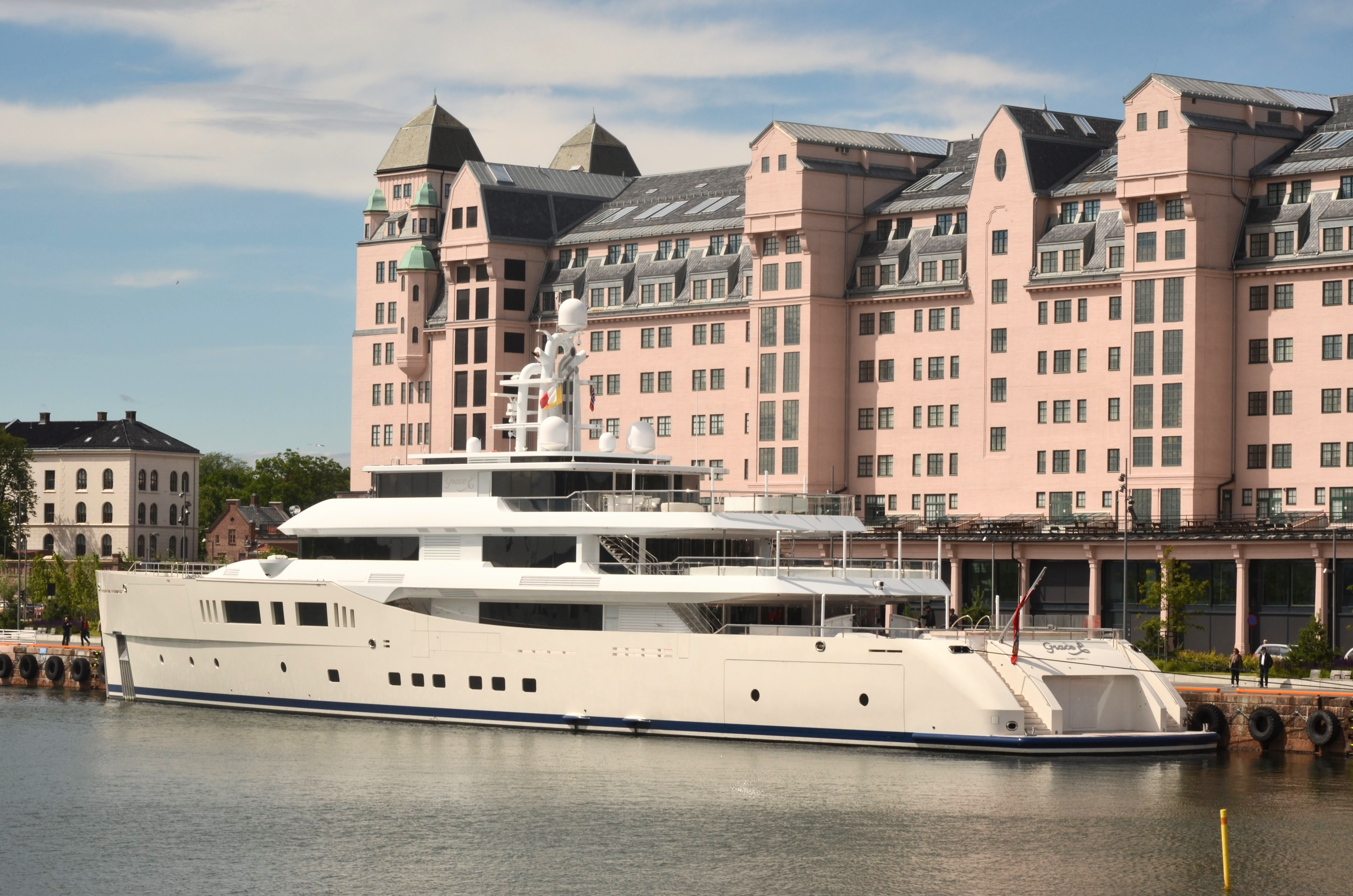
- Grace E in Oslo, 2015

History
- Name: Nautilus (since 2018) Grace E (before 2018
- Port of registry: Cayman Islands
- Ordered: 1012
- Builder: Perini Navi
- Launched: 16 September 2013
- Identification: IMO number: 1011886; MMSI number: 319048800

General characteristics
- Class & type: Motor yacht; conversion
- Tonnage: 1,876 GT
- Length: 73.0 m (239.5 ft)
- Beam: 13.3 m (44 ft)
- Draft: 4.0 m (13.1 ft)
- Capacity: 12
- Crew: 20

Nautilus is a 73-meter (239 ft) long motor yacht originally built for Bob Stiller and his wife Christine, debuting in 2014. Originally named Grace E, she was renamed Nautilus in 2018, following her sale to Thierry Stern. She was built and launched by Perini Navi based on a design by Philippe Briand of Vitruvius Yachts. She is the third motor yacht in the Picchiotti Vitruvius series, following Exuma and Galileo G. Her interior design was by Rémi Tessier.

== History ==
In May 2015, the hull for Grace E arrived in La Spezia after being constructed in the company's facility in Turkey. She was launched in September 2013 and underwent sea trials which were completed in March 2014. She debuted in September at the 2014 Monaco Yacht Show.

She was listed for sale in October 2017 with the sellers reportedly asking €78,500,000. She was sold to new owners in March 2018 and redelivered following refit and maintenance by NCA Refit. She was renamed Nautilus by her new owners in 2018.

== Design and specifications ==
Originally envisioned as a smaller craft, the project grew in size to improve space and comfort evolving from a three-deck 53-metre yacht into a five-deck 73-metre vessel. The design brief delivered by Tessier emphasized efficiency, quiet operation, and “Zen-like” onboard living.

The yacht has a steel hull and aluminium superstructure and uses diesel-electric propulsion with two ABB Azipod units. She has a maximum speed of about 17.5 knots, a cruising speed of about 14 knots, and a range of about 7,800 nautical miles at 12 knots. Her notable features include a dedicated wellness deck, dynamic positioning to reduce anchoring in sensitive marine environments, advanced waste-management and exhaust-filtration systems, and a panoramic elevator connecting guest decks.

== Awards ==
At her debut in September 2014 at the Monaco Yacht Show, she won 4 Showboats Design Awards and the Baccarat Trophy. In March 2015, she won four Neptune awards for Naval Architecture – Displacement Motor Yacht, by Philippe Briand, Exterior Design & Styling Motor Yacht above 500 GT, by Vitruvius Yachts, Environmental Protection Award by Vitruvius Yachts Ltd, and Interior Design - Motor Yacht above 500 GT, by Remi Tessier Design. In May 2015, Grace E won Motor Yacht Of The Year at the 10th edition of the Boat International World Superyacht Awards.

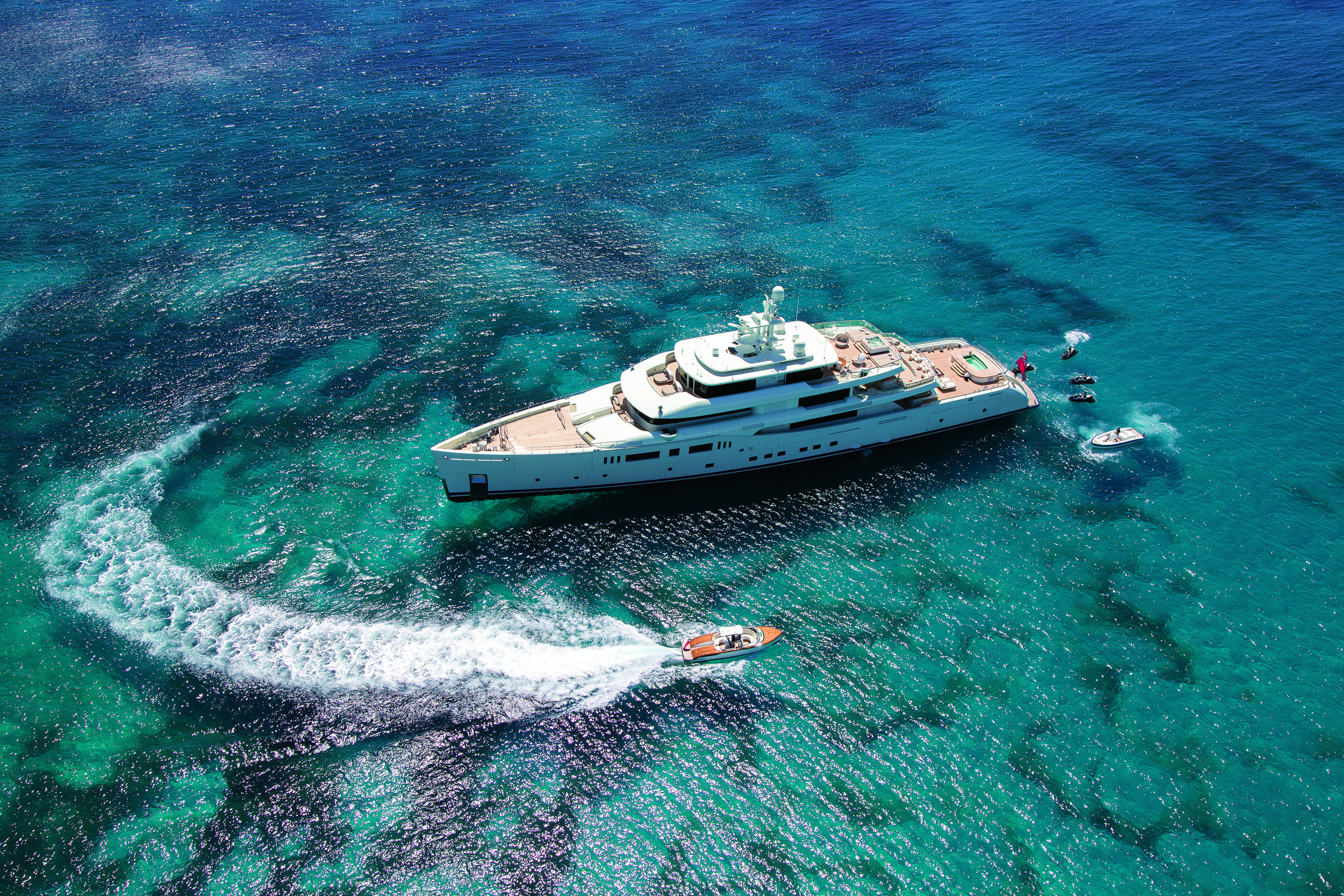
Nautilus

== Sightings ==
In June 2016, she was spotted in London and in Ireland that July. In February 2020, she was spotted in Saint Thomas. She was in Europe during summer 2022, with photographs taken of her docked in Corfu in June and cruising off Antibes in September. She was spotted off Saint Barthélemy during New Years festivities in 2026. In June 2026 she docked in Poole Harbour.

== See also ==
- List of yachts built by Perini Navi
