= Parsifal III =

Sailing yacht built in 2005

History

United Kingdom
- Name: Parsifal III
- Builder: Perini Navi
- Completed: 2005
- Notes: IMO number: 9451111

General characteristics
- Type: Yacht for charter
- Tonnage: 460 GT
- Length: 54 m (177 ft)
- Beam: 10.70 m (35.1 ft)
- Draft: 4.50 m (14.8 ft)
- Speed: 11 knots (20 km/h; 13 mph) (cruising)
- Capacity: 12 passengers in 5 cabins
- Crew: 9 crew members

Parsifal III is a 54-metre (177 feet) sailing yacht built in 2005 by Perini Navi, currently owned by Danish entrepreneur Kim Vibe-Petersen. Parsifal III became popular through Bravo's television show Below Deck Sailing Yacht.

The yacht was last refitted in 2012, with its interior designed by Rémi Tessier and its exterior styled by Perini Navi.

In 2006, Parsifal III won the World Superyacht Awards Sailing Yacht of the Year Award, as well as Best Interior Design – Sail Yacht. It also won Sailing Yacht Interior at the ShowBoats Awards in 2006.

== Accommodation ==
Parsifal III can accommodate up to 12 guests in five rooms, including a master suite, two double cabins, two twin cabins and two Pullman beds. It can carry up to nine crew members.

== See also ==
List of yachts built by Perini Navi
