= Fabio Perini (company) =

Fabio Perini S.p.A.
- Type: Società per Azioni
- Industry: Mechanical engineering
- Founded: Lucca, Italy (1966)
- Founder: Fabio Perini
- Headquarters: Lucca, Italy
- Area served: Worldwide
- Key people: Stefano Di Santo, CEO
- Products: Paper making and tissue converting industrial machinery
- Services: Machine and production line installation; Training; Overhauling; Engineering solutions and replacement kits for obsolete parts Reconditioning and commercializing of second-hand tissue converting equipment.
- Number of employees: 566 (2011)
- Parent: Körber
- Divisions: Körber Process Solutions
- Website: www.fabioperini.com

Fabio Perini S.p.A. is an Italian engineering company, specialized in machine design and manufacturing of industrial machinery for the paper making industry and the tissue converting industry. The company is a part of the international technology group Körber and belongs to its division Körber Process Solutions. The management holding of the Körber Group, Körber AG, is located in Hamburg, Germany.

== Overview ==
Fabio Perini S.p.A. is a mechanical engineering company, established in Lucca, Italy, in 1966 by the inventor/entrepreneur Fabio Perini. The company is specialized in design and manufacturing of industrial machinery for the paper making industry and the tissue converting industry.

Based in Lucca, the company has eleven overseas branches located in three continents (Europe, America and Asia).

Since 1994 Fabio Perini S.p.A. is part of the German technology group Körber, and belongs to the division Körber Process Solutions.

== History ==
=== Fabio Perini and the Company rising ===
Fabio Perini started his activity in 1960, when he invented a machinery for the automatic cut of tissue paper.

In 1966, he found a company, called Fabio Perini, which prior focus was designing new engineering technologies and manufacturing industrial machinery for the tissue converting industry.

With the change and the improvement of lifestyles, the Italian tissue industry raised noticeably during the 1960s.

This fact favored Fabio Perini's company, which grew up until 1973, when the company was turned into a Società per Azioni, becoming the Fabio Perini S.p.A..

=== Fabio Perini S.p.A. ===
Under the new form of Società per Azioni, Fabio Perini S.p.A. initiated an international expansion. In the 1970s new offices were opened in Europe and America: two selling offices in Europe (Paris, 1974; Düsseldorf, 1976), one selling office in the United States (Green Bay, Wisconsin, 1978, at the Green Bay Engineering Company) and one manufacturing plant in Latin America (Joinville, Brazil, 1975).

During the '1980s and the '1990s further branches were opened in Asia (Yokohama, 1984; Hong Kong, 1985; Fuji, 1991), Europe (London, 1984) and United States (Miami, 1990).

Over the course of around 20 years, the company Fabio Perini became a multinational enterprise that served 75% of the worldwide market of the paper making industry and the tissue converting machinery.

As acknowledgement of his entrepreneurship, in 1991 the founder Fabio Perini was ordered Knight of the Italian Republic, under the Order of Merit for Labour.

=== Entering the Körber Group ===
In 1994 the founder Fabio Perini sold his company to the German multinational group Körber, meanwhile remaining company's headquarters in Lucca, Italy.

Next years after Körber acquisition, three new overseas branches were opened in Asia: two selling offices (Singapore, 1994; Seoul, 1995) and one manufacturing plant (Shanghai, 2002).

In 2003 Perini Engraving S.r.l. (it. Società a responsabilità Limitata) was opened in Lucca, a division of the Fabio Perini S.p.A. group specialized in the design and manufacturing of customized embossing rolls for tissue production.

== Products ==
Some of the machinery designed and manufactured by Fabio Perini S.p.A. are:

- Toilet roll and kitchen towel converting lines;
- Table napkin converting equipment;
- Embossers, laminators, printing units;
- Slitter rewinders for the production of industrial rolls;
- Customized embossing rolls for tissue production.

== Publishing Activity ==
Since 1979 Fabio Perini S.p.A. publishes the Perini Journal, a six-monthly review completely dedicated to the tissue paper industry.

== See also ==
- List of Italian companies
- Fabio Perini
- Körber Process Solutions
- Perini Journal
- Toilet roll
- Table napkin
- Kitchen Towel
- Embossing
- Tissue paper
- Pulp and paper industry
