= KARTA Center =

Polish non-governmental institute

- KARTA Center Foundation
- Ośrodek KARTA
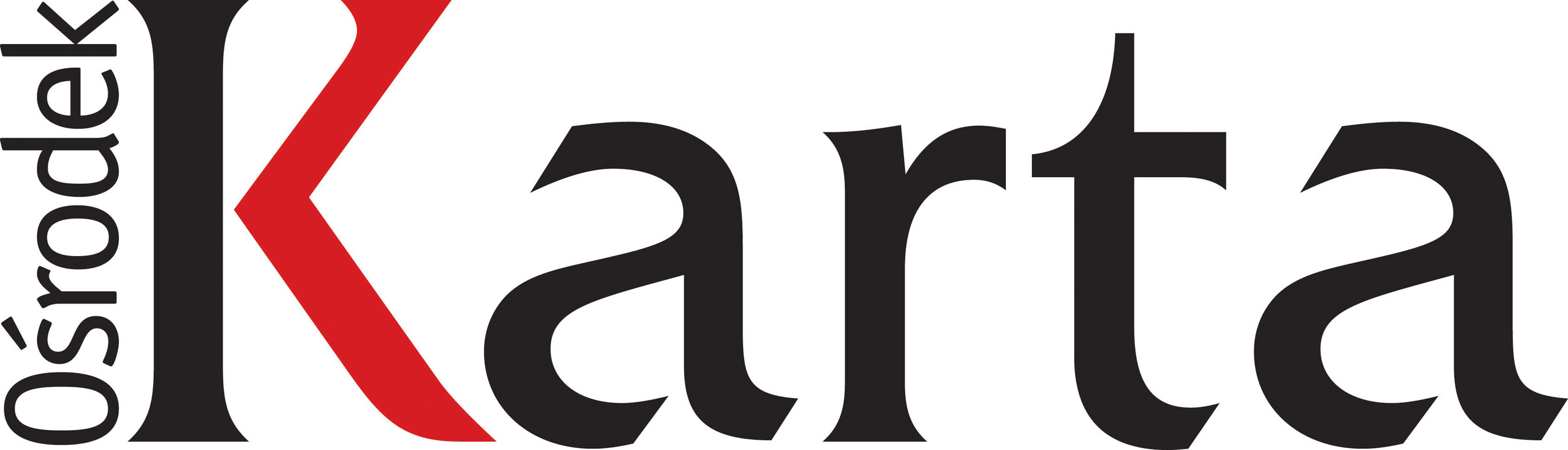

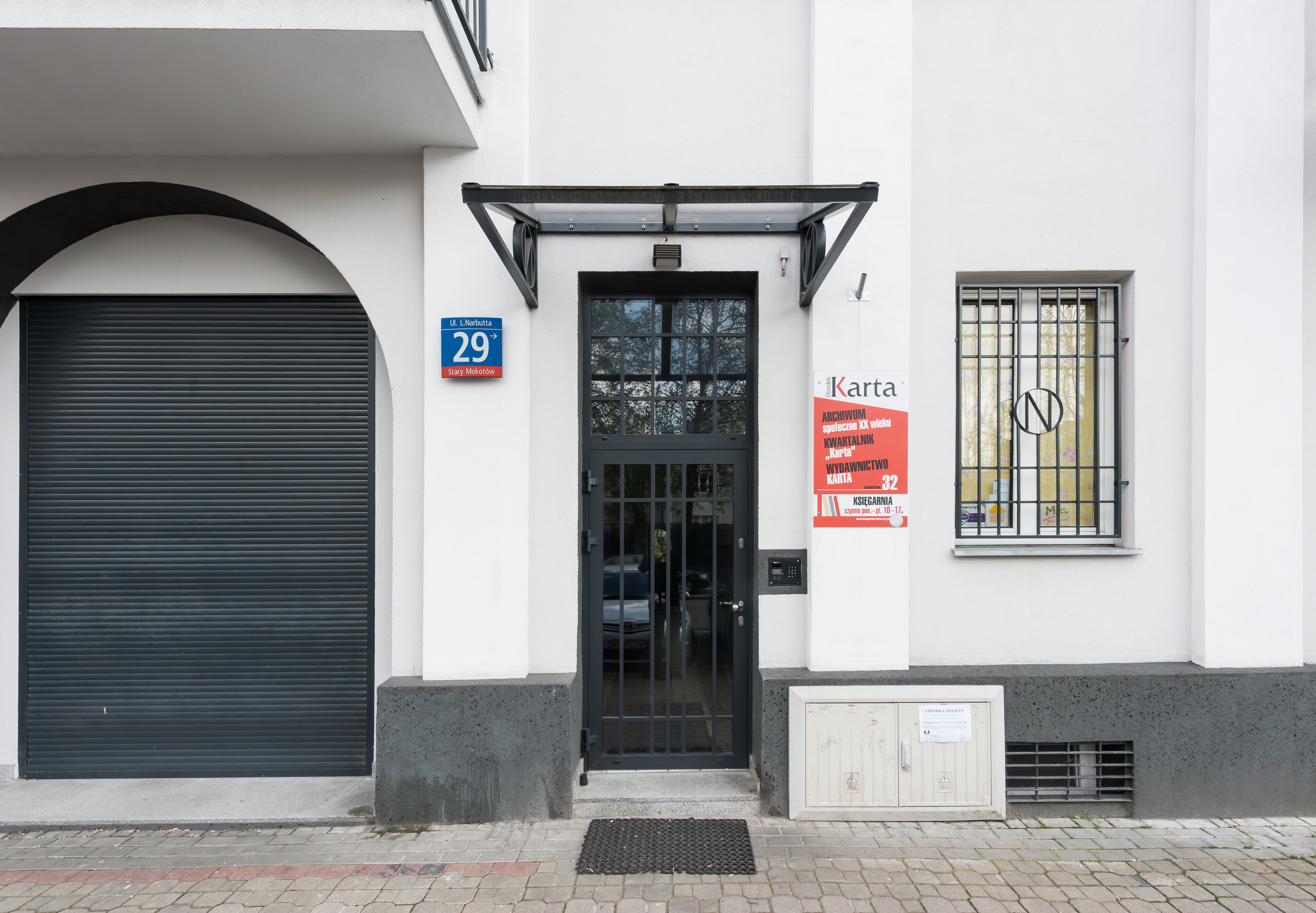
- The KARTA Cente's headquarters in Mokotów, 2023
- Merged into: Memorial
- Formation: January 1982; 44 years ago
- Type: NGO
- Headquarters: 29 Ludwik Narbutta Street
- Location: Mokotów, Warsaw, Poland
- Region served: Central and Eastern Europe
- Publication: Karta
- Subsidiaries: History Meeting House
- Website: karta.org.pl
- KRS: 0000119146

The KARTA Center (Polish: Ośrodek KARTA) or the KARTA Center Foundation (Polish: Fundacja Ośrodka KARTA) is a Polish non-governmental public benefit organization, whose aim is documenting and popularizing the recent history of Poland and history of Eastern Europe and strengthening tolerance and democracy.

== History of the KARTA Center Foundation ==
The KARTA community founded in 1982 in Warsaw during the time of martial law in Poland as an illegal underground paper, named Karta, focusing on political commentaries (19 issues), which was transformed after a few months into an independent almanac presenting human attitudes towards dictatorship (seven issues). In 1987 the Karta editorial team initiated the foundation of the independent Eastern Archive - a social movement documenting the concealed and distorted "Eastern" past (with nearly 200 people organized in 12 branches all over Poland in one year). Since 1990 Incorporation of the Eastern Archive Foundation and the KARTA Foundation had been cooperated closely with each other. In 1991 the KARTA Center founded combining all branches of both Foundations. In 1992 the KARTA Center began its international activities with "The Conscience Week in Poland", a meeting in Warsaw with 54 members of the Memorial. In 1996 the two Foundations merged. The objective of new KARTA Center Foundation was to "promote and strengthen tolerance and democracy". In 1996 there was the final of the first competition for high school students, the so-called "History at Hand".

The KARTA Center Foundation is a book and magazine publisher, organizes many exhibitions and educational events, and acts as an archive for documents. The KARTA Center co-founded in 2001 the EUSTORY, the European network of organizers of history competition in Europe, and take part in summer schools, autumn academies and General Assemblies. In 2005 KARTA initiated the History Meeting House in Warsaw with a permanent multimedia exhibition "The Faces of Totalitarianism", in the same year the launch of the Learning from history site. It is the center promoting the 20th century history, a place of educational and opinion-forming activities in Warsaw, Poland and internationally. Since March 2006 the History Meeting House is a local government cultural institution.

== Focal points of the KARTA Center Foundation ==
=== Retaining the past ===
The KARTA Center Foundation is collecting the oral and written statements and documents:

==== Oral-History-Team ====
The oral-history-team records interviews and collects written statements about people experiences. The aim of the program is to record, archive and make available biographic accounts of the 20th century history witnesses.

==== Documents Emergency Service ====
The team of the documents emergency service helps to rescue the documents or to exhibit the documents to the publicity.

==== Archives and collections ====
The KARTA Center Foundation curates its archives and collections:

- the Eastern Archive 1901-56,
- the Index of the Repressed 1939-56 - part of the Eastern Archive,
- the Opposition Archive 1956-89,
- the Archive of Victims of the Polish-Ukrainian Conflicts in the 40th of the 20th century,
- the photographic archive and
- the oral history archive.
  Most of the databases and archives of “Karta” are available online.

=== Popularizing history ===
==== Exhibitions and educational events ====
The KARTA Center Foundation organizes exhibitions and educational events in the „History Meeting House“

==== Books and magazines ====
The KARTA Center Foundation publishes books and magazines, e.g. quarterly journal „Karta“ and selling them in the Internet.

==== Historic competitions ====
The KARTA Center organizes competition for pupils „History at Hand“ – projects of pupils based on history of everyday live and experiences of people in the 20th century. The competition is a part of the EUSTORY network.

==== Historic Websites ====
The KARTA Center Foundation develops and manages Websites on historic topic: „Learning from the history“ (since 2005) and „The 20th century“ (since 2009).

=== Networking with European NGOs to popularize history ===
The KARTA Center Foundation co-founded in 2001 the EUSTORY, the European network of history competition organizers from 20 European countries, established by the Körber Foundation of Hamburg, and takes part in summer schools, autumn academies and General Assemblies.

== Awards ==
- 1990 - Award of the Association of Polish Journalists - for new way of writing about the contemporary history
- 2001 - Certificate of the Polish Foreign Minister for promotion of Poland abroad
- 2001 - Saint-George-Award of "Tygodnik Powszechny" for the campaign against the misremember
- 2002 - Jerzy-Giedroyc-Award of the newspaper "Rzeczpospolita"
- 2002 - Grand Prix in "Pro Publico Bono" for the best civil initiative in Poland
- 2005 - Award of the Office for War Veterans and Victims of Oppression
- 2008 - Award of Memoria Iustorum for the supporting of Polish-Ukrainian dialogue
- 2008 - Award in "Pro Publico Bono" for the supporting of the civil society in Poland
- 2009 - Grand Prix in "Pro Publico Bono" for the best civil initiative of the last 20 years of the independent Poland

== See also ==
- History Meeting House
