= History Meeting House =

Historical and cultural institute in Poland

- Other name: DSH
- Parent institution: KARTA Center
- Established: 2006; 20 years ago
- Director: Katarzyna Puchalska
- Address: 20 Karowa Street
- Location: Śródmieście, Warsaw, Masovian Voivodeship, Third Polish Republic
- Website: dsh.waw.pl

The History Meeting House (Polish: Dom Spotkań z Historią, DSH) is a municipal institution of culture in Warsaw, Poland. The DSH was founded in 2006 and its activity is focused on the testimonies of the 20th century history. The idea to set up DSH was developed by the KARTA Center - non-governmental institution documenting history.

The base of the DSH's activities is multimedia exhibition "The Faces of Totalitarianism", which presents the totalitarian experience in the 20th century from several national perspectives.

The DSH offers also other historical exhibitions, film shows, meetings and debates.
