= Vava II =

Megayacht owned by Ernesto Bertarelli

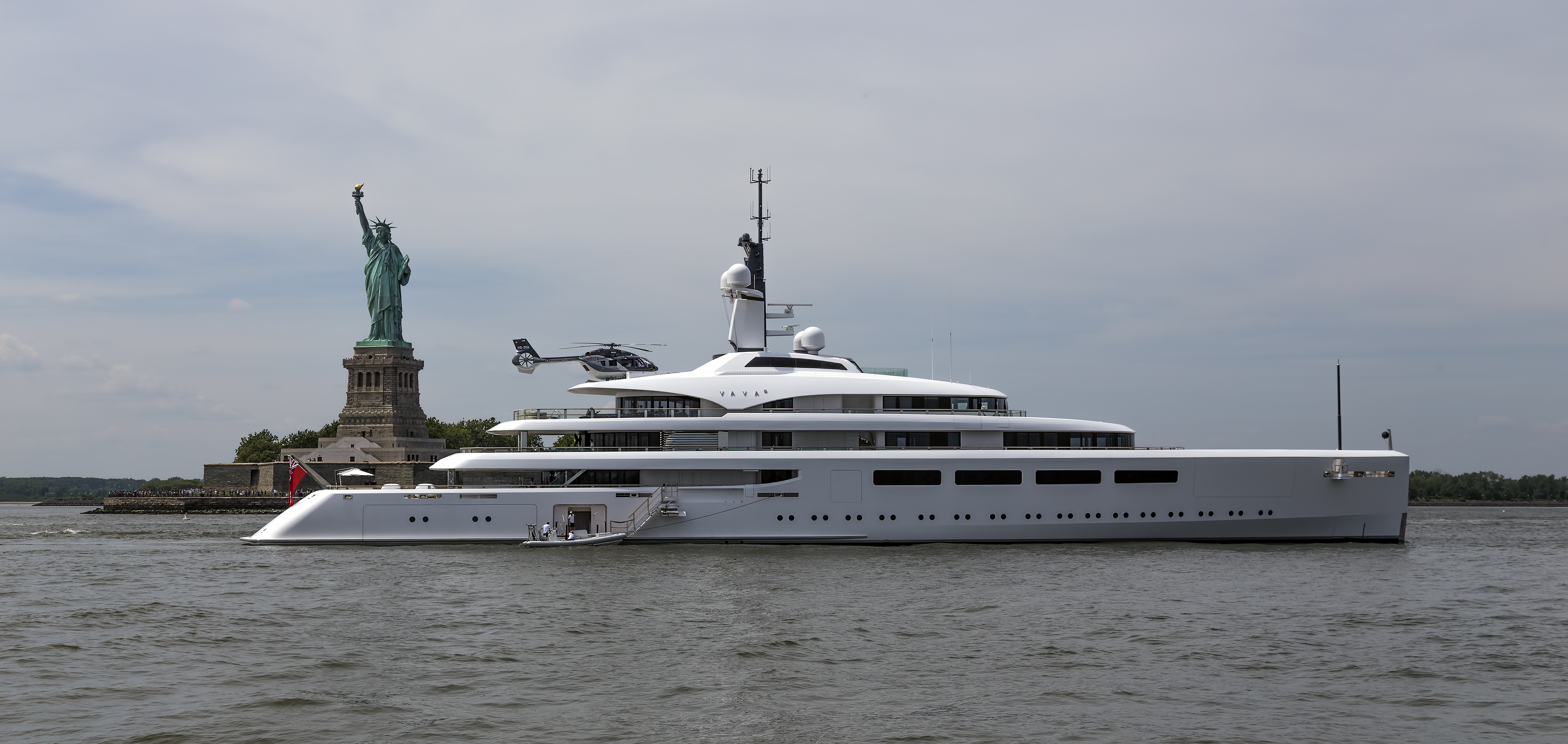
- Vava II in New York Harbor (2017)

History
- Name: Vava II
- Owner: Ernesto Bertarelli; (Lighthouse Marine Ltd)
- Port of registry: George Town, Cayman Islands
- Ordered: 2007
- Builder: Devonport Yachts and Appledore Shipbuilders
- Cost: c. GB£150 million
- Yard number: 55
- Launched: 2 December 2009
- Christened: 10 September 2011
- Identification: IMO number: 1010387; MMSI number: 319808000; Callsign: ZGBG9
- Status: In service

General characteristics
- Type: Private motor yacht
- Tonnage: 3,933 GT; 1,179 NT
- Length: 96.83 m
- Beam: 17.21 m
- Height: 8.5 m
- Draught: 4.79 m
- Decks: 6
- Installed power: 8770kW (11922bhp)
- Propulsion: 4 x MTU, twin propellers
- Speed: 18.5 kts
- Capacity: 52 persons
- Crew: 30 persons

MY Vava II is the 97-metre superyacht commissioned by Swiss entrepreneur Ernesto Bertarelli in 2007. Built by Devonport Yachts at Plymouth, England, the hull was built by sister shipyard Appledore Shipbuilders, both being owned by Babcock Marine. She was launched on 2 December 2009 and then taken to Devonport for the accommodation section to be lifted onto the ship. She was fully completed in February 2012. When constructed she was claimed to be the largest British-built superyacht and was the last yacht built by Devonport Yachts following its acquisition by Pendennis Shipyard. The yacht's designers were Hampshire-based firm Redman Whitely Dixon (exterior) and the French interior designer Remi Tessier.

Vava II has a length of 96.83 m (317 ft 8 in), breadth of 17.21 m (56 ft 6 in) and draught of 4.79 m (15 ft 9 in). The yacht is powered by four MTU engines, two of 12cyl (type 12V4000M71) of 2610 bhp each, and two of 16cyl (type 16V4000M71) of 3351 bhp each, totalling 11922 bhp. They are geared to twin propellers and produce a service speed of 18.5 knots.

The yacht, previously known as Project-55, was christened on 10 September 2011 and sailed on her maiden voyage in early 2012. Vava II's registered owner is Lighthouse Marine Ltd of St Helier, Jersey and she flies the Cayman Islands flag with port of registry George Town.

The Bertarellis' previous yacht was Vava, a 47-metre motor yacht built by Royal Van Lent/Feadship, Netherlands in 1996.
