= The Italian Sea Group =

Italian shipbuilding company

The Italian Sea Group S.p.A. (The Italian Sea Group)
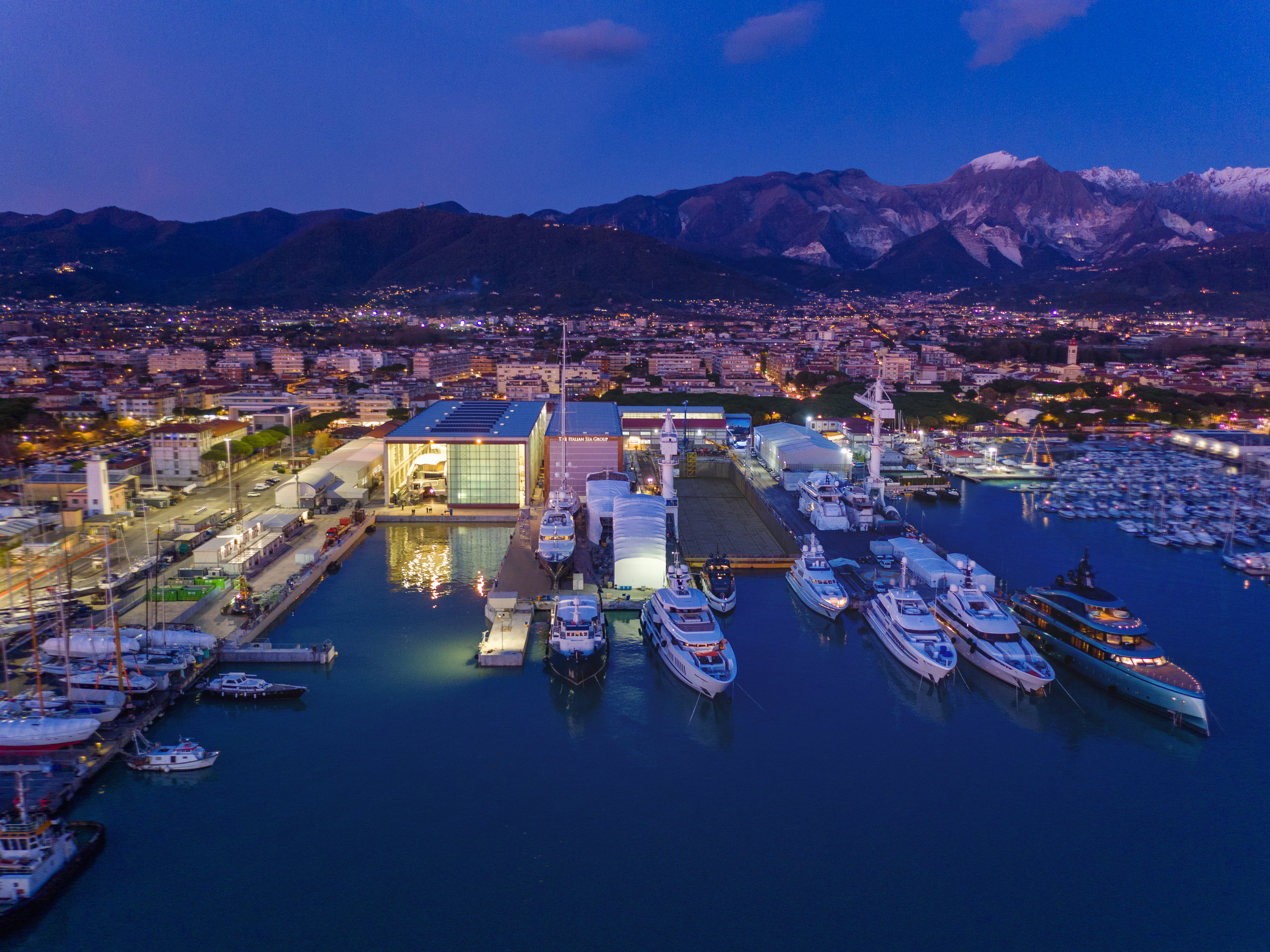
- The Italian Sea Group's headquarters, Marina di Carrara
- Type: Società per Azioni
- Traded as: BIT: TISG
- Industry: Shipbuilding
- Founded: 2009; 17 years ago
- Founder: Giovanni Costantino
- Headquarters: Marina di Carrara, Massa Carrara, Tuscany, Italy
- Area served: Worldwide
- Key people: Giovanni Costantino (founder and CEO); Fabio Zanobini (CFO)
- Products: Yachts
- Revenue: US$0.39 Billion (2024)
- Owner: Giovanni Costantino
- Website: www.theitalianseagroup.com

The Italian Sea Group S.p.A. is an Italian shipbuilding company headquartered in Marina di Carrara which specialises in the construction and refit of luxury motor yachts and sailing yachts up to 140 metres, and it's the first builder in Italy for yachts over 50 metres.

== History ==
The Italian Sea Group was founded in 2009 by Giovanni Costantino with the acquisition of Tecnomar. In 2012 The Italian Sea Group acquired Nuovi Cantieri Apuania (NCA). On 25 May 2020, in the midst of the COVID-19 pandemic, the collaboration between The Italian Sea Group and Automobili Lamborghini was announced for the design and construction of "Tecnomar for Lamborghini", Tecnomar's new motor yacht inspired by the Lamborghini Sián FKP 37. On 4 June 2020, The Italian Sea Group launched Geco, the new 55-meter charter yacht by Admiral. On 30 June 2020, Automobili Lamborghini and The Italian Sea Group presented the world premiere of Tecnomar for Lamborghini 63. The new motor yacht represented the union of two Italian technical excellence in the nautical and automotive fields and immediately found particular interest among enthusiasts and collectors. The production of the Tecnomar for Lamborghini 63 was planned as a limited series of only 63 units, in reference to Lamborghini’s year foundation. On 2 February 2021, The Italian Sea Group expressed interest in acquiring Perini Navi, which went bankrupt in January 2021. On 26 February 2021, The Italian Sea Group filed for listing on the Borsa Italiana. In March 2021, The Italian Sea Group continued the expansion of its shipyard in Marina di Carrara and in April 2021 inaugurated its own academy in collaboration with the University of Genoa and the Promostudi Foundation, dedicated to courses for employees and graduates of the Naval Engineering and Mechanical Engineering programs and the Master's degree program in Yacht Design. On 8 June 2021, The Italian Sea Group launched its IPO on the Milan Stock Exchange, with an IPO price of €4.90. The offering was successful, raising €97.02 million. On 29 February 2024, The Italian Sea Group had a market capitalization of US$0.58 Billion.

=== The crisis ===
The company's growth trend is abruptly interrupted when the owners investigate its management. On 20 February 2026, the CEO invested 25 million euros in the company to cover additional costs related to nautical projects under development. The stock price drops by 35.8%. The owners discover a disproportionate rise in project costs, primarily resulting from actions taken in bad faith by company executives and engaged KPMG to assess the company's financial situation. The owners report this conduct to the judicial authorities on 9 March 2026. On 16 March 2026, the negotiated crisis settlement procedure is initiated at the Court of Florence. In March 2026, Leonardo Maria Del Vecchio's LMDV Capital seemed to be considering a financial stake or a purchase of the entire corporate group. However, these assessments are not followed by concrete actions and the shareholding structure does not change. Other competitors are also evaluating a possible acquisition of the group in whole or in part. The request for a negotiated resolution of the crisis caused the stock to plummet by 47% on 17 March 2026. On 21 April 2026, the stock price recovered by 11.9% after the Florence Court confirmed the protective measures. As of the end of May 2026, however, the company continues to operate at full capacity and is carrying out an assessment of its financial situation. On 1 July 2026, the company filed an application with the Court of Florence to access a crisis resolution procedure. On 3 July 2026, the Court of Florence granted the petition, initiated the crisis resolution procedure, and appointed the judicial commissioners: Professor Niccolò Abriani (lawyer), Riccardo Forgheschi, and Manuela Olastri. On 6 July 2026, the Court of Florence initiated the composition with creditors procedure for business continuity. The objective is to preserve business continuity and safeguard the company's value in the interest of creditors and stakeholders. On 20 July 2026, Giovanni Costantino resigned as Chairman and CEO of The Italian Sea Group; at the same time, his son, Gianmaria Costantino, also stepped down as a board member. As July 2026, Costantino indirectly holds, through GC Holding S.p.A. , a 53.604% stake in the company's share capital, corresponding to 28,410,000 ordinary shares. The board member, Gianmaria Costantino does not hold any stake in the company, either directly or indirectly. On 31 July 2026, the Board of Directors approved the consolidated financial statements for the year ended December 31, 2025. The Italian Sea Group closed the 2025 financial year with total revenues of 295.1 million euros, a 27% decrease compared to 2024. Operating revenues stood at 282 million, down 31%. EBITDA was -99.2 million, a decline from the positive 70.3 million recorded as of December 31, 2024. Total direct costs related to the production of vessels and refit projects—covering raw materials, processing, technical consulting, personnel, and other items—amounted to 393 million euros, an increase of 59 million compared to the 2024 financial statements, despite the drop in revenues and the limited number of new orders secured in 2025. EBIT was -141.2 million, a decline from the positive 57.7 million reported for the previous financial year. The net result stood at -170.9 million, compared to a profit of 33.9 million in 2024. The net financial position was negative at 129.6 million, compared to a negative net financial position of 12.5 million as of December 31, 2024. The total value of the order book—defined as the gross value of existing contracts for new yachts not yet delivered to clients—amounted to 1.03 billion as of December 31, 2025, compared to 1.24 billion at the end of 2024. The total value of existing contracts for yachts not yet delivered to clients, net of revenues already recognized in the income statement (net backlog), stood at 349.5 million as of December 31, 2025, compared to 433.4 million at the end of 2024. The 2025 financial year highlights that this wasn't merely a matter of additional costs; rather, the company’s entire economic and financial management was critical. On 4 August 2026, Sri Group Global, owned by Giulio Gallazzi (52%) and Bernardo Vacchi (48%, via Finvacchi), submitted a non-binding expression of interest to the company’s board of directors and judicial commissioners, subject to due diligence, for the acquisition of the company’s business assets. As of August 31, 2026, TISG's net equity was negative at €422.651 million, a decrease of €30.3 million compared to June 30. The net loss for the first eight months amounted to €46.14 million, and shipbuilding operations continued to generate losses.

=== The acquisition ===
On 16 November 2026, the Court of Florence accepted a €220 million offer from Sri Global for the full acquisition of the company. The shareholders are prepared to take legal action against the executives, managers, and owners of The Italian Sea Group should the procedure for indirect business continuity be initiated.They opposed to any compulsory liquidation of the company, as well as the wiping out of the value of their shares, and are calling for its continued operation and its economic and financial recovery. As of 19 November 2026, operations at the shipyards are at a standstill, and the necessary liquidity is being provided by the new incoming entity, Sri Global, in the amount of 20 million. At the moment, The Italian Sea Group is not producing yachts; rather, it is producing debt and burning through cash.

== Operations ==
=== Brands ===
The Italian Sea Group specializes in the design, construction and marketing of luxury yachts through its brands:

Brand	Type	Country
Tecnomar	Shipbuilding	Italy
Admiral	Shipbuilding	Italy
Nuovi Cantieri Apuania (NCA)	Refit	Italy
Celi	woodworking furnishings Interior design	Italy
Perini Navi	Shipbuilding	Italy
Picchiotti	Shipbuilding	Italy

Furthermore, Tecnomar has a collaboration with Lamborghini. While Admiral has a collaboration with Giorgio Armani.

== Main shareholders ==
The main shareholders of The Italian Sea Group on 12 August 2025 are:

Name	%
GC Holding S.p.A	53.6%
Market	30.01%
Alychlo NV/SA	11.4%
Giorgio Armani S.p.A.	4.99%

The main shareholders of The Italian Sea Group on 27 August 2026 are:

Name	%
GC Holding S.p.A	53.6%
Market	46.4%
