= Kurt A. Körber =

German businessman

Kurt A. Körber (7 September 1909 – 10 August 1992) was a German founder and businessman, who founded a group of companies including the Hauni Maschinenbau AG, an internationally leading company for the production of machines for the tobacco industry. The sole shareholder of the companies is the Körber Foundation, which was initiated in 1959 by Körber. Until his death in 1992, he was the sole owner of the Körber AG. His philanthropic slant also manifested itself in donations to Thalia Theater, Hamburger Kunsthalle, and Hamburg State Opera.

Körber became member of the NSDAP in 1940.

He was born in Berlin and died in Hamburg.
