= Perini Journal =

Perini Journal – The World of Tissue
- Type: Two yearly issues magazine
- Format: A4: 210X297 mm
- Owner(s): Fabio Perini S.p.A.
- Editor: Maura Leonardi
- Founded: 1979
- Language: Italian/English, English/Chinese
- Headquarters: Lucca
- Circulation: 20,000
- Website: www.perinijournal.com

The Perini Journal is the main trade journal in the world completely dedicated to the tissue paper industry.

It is published in two yearly issues and in two different editions: the western, in Italian/English language, with an average printed copies of 17,500; and the eastern, in English/Chinese language, with an average printed copies of 2,500. The illustrations are made by Italian painter Guido Scarabottolo.

== History ==
Published by Fabio Perini S.p.A., the first issue of the publication (dated back to 1979, printed under the name Perini News Sheet) represented a house organ for the company, and was aimed at supplying useful information on the tissue market. It was published in bilingual form (Italian and English) and delivered to recipients on a worldwide scale.

Growth of the tissue industry in the 1980s led the company in 1989 to transform its original publication into the first trade magazine dedicated exclusively to the tissue and related fields: the Perini Journal – PJL. Today the magazine, published twice a year in 20,000 copies, is an independent trade publication.

== Distribution ==
The Perini Journal is sent directly to over 17,500 contacts contained in a mailing list covering a distribution network that reaches Europe, Canada, USA, South America, Asia, Africa, Australia and New Zealand. It is also available online through the official website or an iPhone app.

== Perini Journal's TidBits ==
PJL's Tidbits is a new editorial initiative by Perini Journal – PJL with the scope of supplying "bits" of news & curiosities on and around the world of paper.

== See also ==
- Toilet paper
- Paper
- Toilet roll holder
