= Körber Process Solutions =

Division of technology group Körber

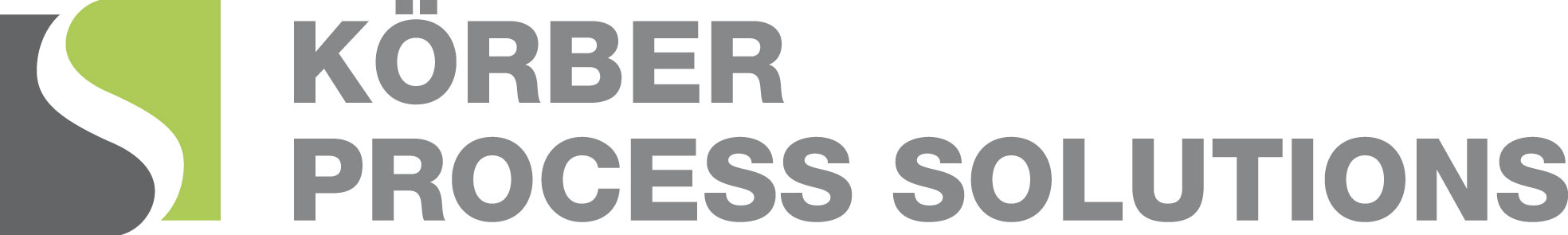
- Company type: GmbH
- Industry: Mechanical engineering
- Founded: 1999 (as Körber PaperLink)
- Headquarters: Hamburg, Germany
- Key people: Hildemar Böhm, President
- Number of employees: 2,101 (2011)
- Website: www.koerberprocess.com

Körber Process Solutions is a division of the international technology group Körber. Körber Process Solutions GmbH is the division's management holding company, advising and supporting the divisional companies.

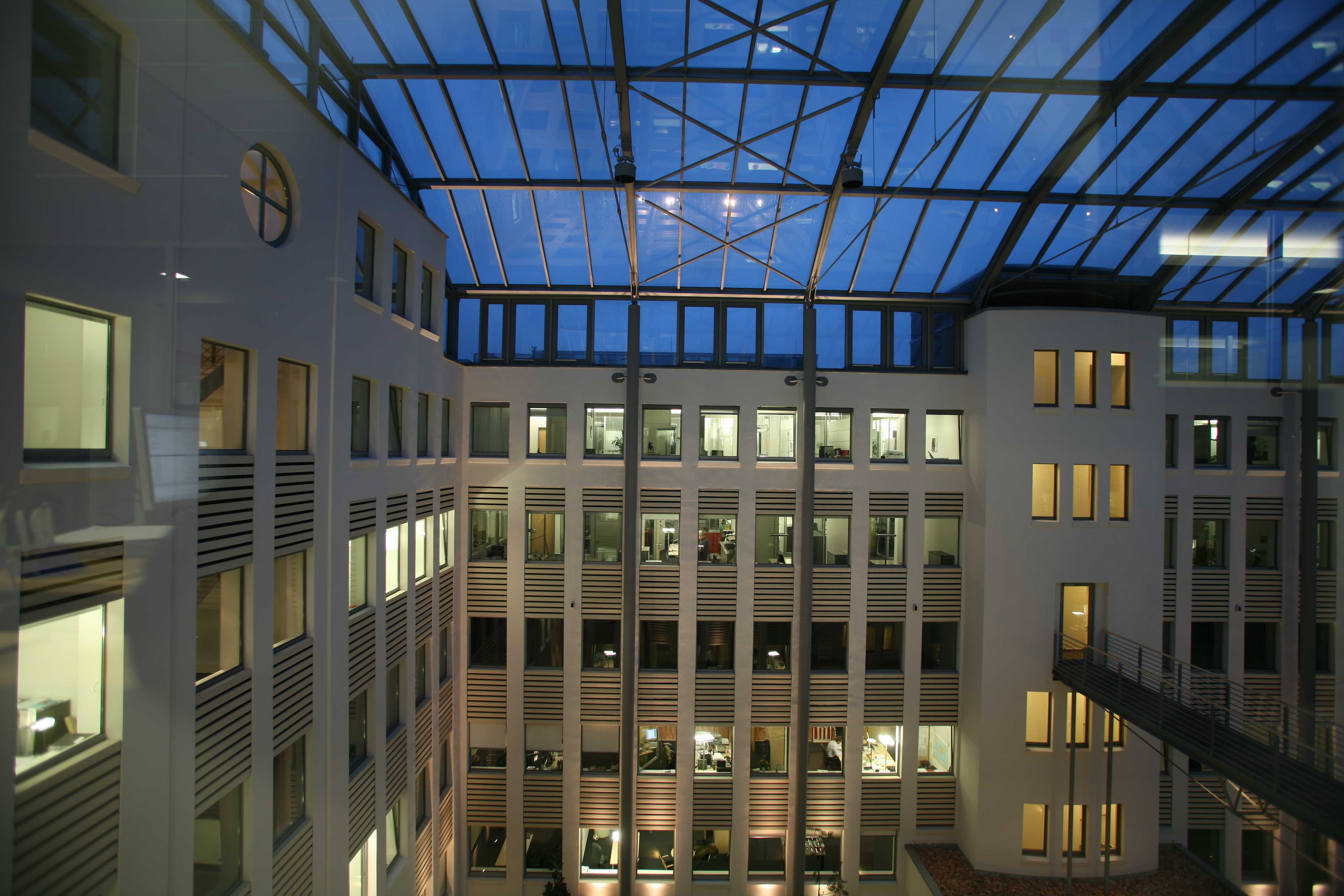
Körber Process Solutions Headquarter, Hamburg (Germany)

== Division ==
Körber Process Solutions (formerly Körber PaperLink) based in Hamburg, Germany, combines internationally operating companies specialized in manufacturing machines and providing solutions, technologies and services for the following areas: Converting and packaging of tissue products (Business Unit Tissue), hygiene products (Business Unit Hygiene), mail solutions (Business Unit Mail Solutions) as well as intralogistics (Business Unit Intralogistics) and electronics manufacturing.

The following companies are part of Körber Process Solutions: Aberle, Baltic Elektronik, Fabio Perini S.p.A., KPL Packaging, Körber Engineering Shanghai, Winkler + Dünnebier, W+D Direct Marketing Solutions and Langhammer.

Körber Process Solutions is represented with sales and service offices in Europe, North America, South America and Asia. In 2011, the division had 2,101 employees worldwide. Sales amounted to EUR 453 million.

== Products and services ==
The Körber Process Solutions companies offer machinery, lines and systems for envelopes and pockets, envelope inserting as well as tissue and hygiene products. In addition, transport and palletizing solutions, further automation solutions for intralogistics as well as electronic printed circuit boards (printed electronics) and devices on customer order are part of their product portfolios.

== See also ==
- Fabio Perini S.p.A.
- Winkler+Dünnebier
