= List of yachts built by Perini Navi =

This is a list of all the yachts built by Italian ship manufacturer Perini Navi and its subsidiary Cantiere Navale Beconcini, sorted by year.

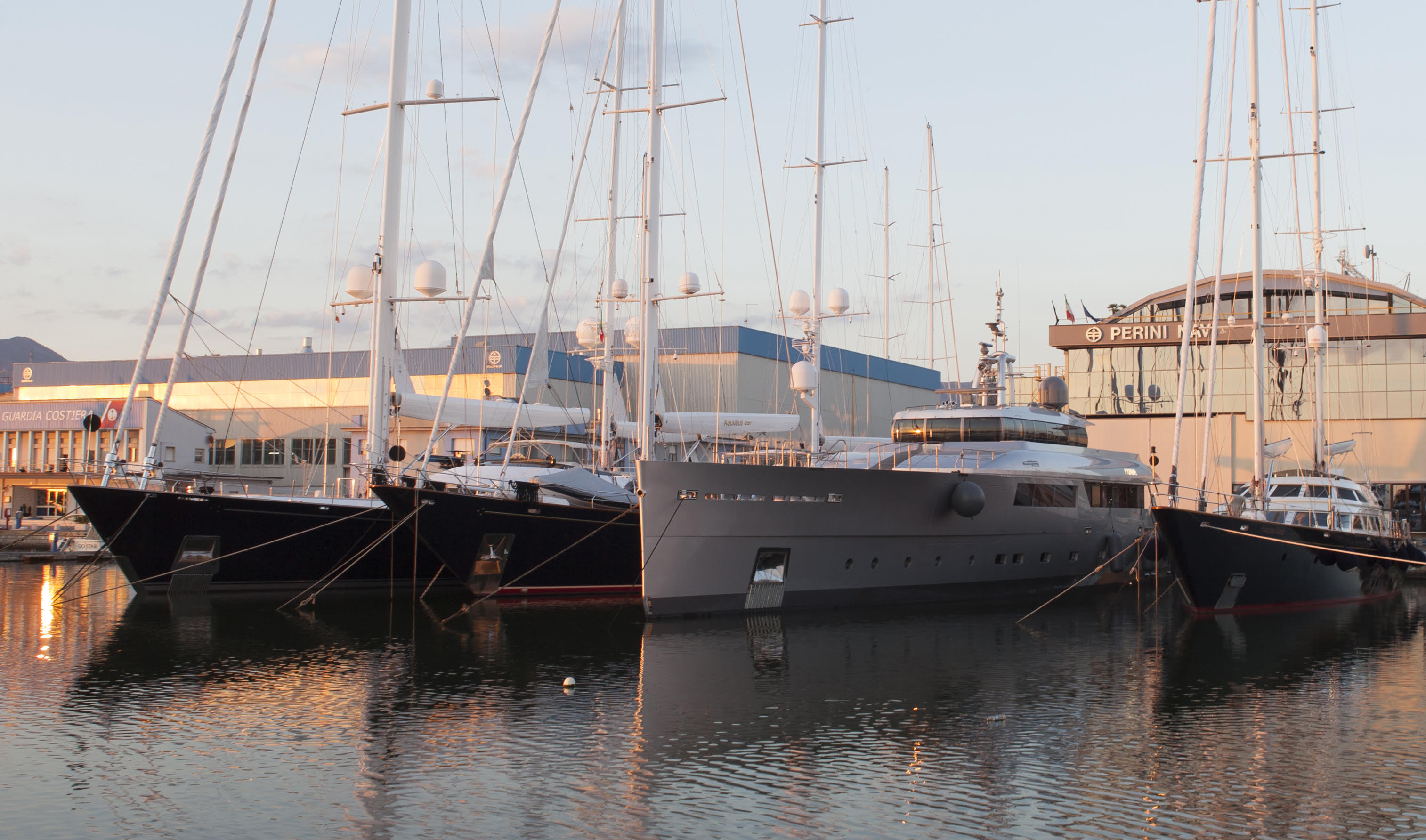
Perini Navi yard in Viareggio, Italy

Was the longest yacht upon completion.

== 1974-1994 ==
Year	Length overall in meters	Name	Reference
1974	31.76	Surama	
1983	38.95	Clan VI	
1986	41.8	Christianne B	
1987	43	Paz	
1989	43.3	Enterprise	
1989	36	Gitana	
1989	24.38	Malizia	
1990	47	Andromeda la Dea	
1990	47	Aquarius	
1991	46	Piropo IV	
1991	40.4	Principessa Vaivia	
1991	46.5	Antara	
1992	37	Carlotta	
1993	48.17	Morning Glory	
1993	48.17	Corelia	
1994	58.08	Taouey	

== 1995-2004 ==
Year	Length overall in meters	Name	Reference
1995	51.84	Xasteria	
1995	48.17	Legacy	
1997	52	Luna	
1997	37	Khaleesi	
1998	53	Jasali II	
1999	50	Phryne	
2000	33.5	Heritage M	
2000	53	Atmosphere	
2000	49.8	Ariane	
2001	49.8	Silencio	
2001	40.4	Ellen V	
2002	52.34	Squall	
2003	55.7	Burrasca	
2003	49.8	Is A Rose	
2003	64	Spirit of the C’s	
2004	43.45	Victoria	
2004	55.9	Zenji	

== 2005-2014 ==
Year	Length overall in meters	Name	Reference
2005	53.8	Parsifal III	
2006	45.3	Heritage	
2006	56	Rosehearty	
2006	88	The Maltese Falcon	
2007	56	Selene	
2007	52	Tamsen	
2007	45	Helios	
2008	24.42	Elettra	
2008	56	Bayesian	
2008	38	P2	
2008	56	Silvana	
2008	50	Baracuda Valletta	
2009	56	Asahi	
2009	56	Panthalassa	
2010	49.5	Exuma	
2010	45	Fivea	
2010	56	Melek	
2011	45	Clan VIII	
2011	56	Fidelis	
2011	55.2	Galileo G	
2012	50	Enterprise	
2012	30.65	Xnoi	
2013	40	State of Grace	
2013	73.3	Nautilus	
2013	60	Seahawk	
2014	60	Perseus 3	

== 2015 - Present ==
Year	Length overall in meters	Name	Reference
2016	70	Sybaris	
2016	38.15	Dahlak	
2017	60	Seven	
2019	25.5	Eco-Tender	

== Under construction ==
Planned delivery	Length overall in meters	Name	Reference
2019	52.6	Project Voyager	
2020	42	Project E-volution, hull #1	
2020	55.6	Project Voyager	
2021	42	Project E-volution, hull #2	
TBA	60	Project C.2239	

== Concept ==
Name	Length overall in meters	Reference
Project Argonaut	92	
Project 55m Heritage	55	
Project 65m Heritage	65	
Project 75m Heritage	75	
Falcon Rig Gallery 56	56	
Falcon Rig Gallery 64	64	
Falcon Rig Gallery 72	72	
Falcon Rig Gallery 80	80	
Falcon Rig Gallery 92	92	
Falcon Rig 102	102	

== See also ==
- List of large sailing yachts
- List of motor yachts by length
- Luxury yacht
- Perini Navi
