= Devonport Management Limited =

Owner of Her Majesty's Naval Base Devonport

Devonport Management Limited owned and managed Devonport Royal Dockyard, the largest dockyard in Western Europe from 1987 until 2007. DML was purchased by Babcock International and was rebranded Babcock Marine.

== History ==
DML, then owned by Brown & Root and Vickers, was one of three companies bidding for the Devonport contract in 1986. The others were Devonport Dockyard, formed by the then management of the dockyard, and a consortium of Foster Wheeler, Appledore Shipbuilders and Wharton Williams.

The DML ownership structure was restructured in 1987, with Brown & Root, Balfour Beatty and Weir Group each owning 29.9% and Barclays de Zoete Wedd owning 10.3%. Vickers had formed a joint venture with Brown & Root which included its contracting arm. The management contract was awarded to DML on 24 February 1987, with management officially transferred on 6 April 1987 The dockyards remained property of the Ministry of Defence at this stage.

In June 1993 DML was awarded the contract for refitting of Royal Navy nuclear submarines. This was the result of a two-year highly politicised battle between DML and the management of Rosyth Dockyard in Scotland. The Rosyth Dockyard already had nuclear refitting facilities under construction when, in 1993, DML made an unsolicited bid to take over the work which in future would only be awarded to one yard. For the next two years the two dockyards made tit-for-tat claims regarding the suitability of their own facilities compared to their competitor.

In 1994 GEC acquired Vickers Shipbuilding & Engineering and withdrew it from the DML consortium. At the urging of the Ministry of Defence, Brown & Root took a 51% stake DML. In February 1993 DML purchased the Devonport yard for £40.3 million.

In 1998 Brown & Root's parent, Halliburton indirectly acquired The M. W. Kellogg Company and merged it with Brown & Root to form KBR. In 2006 it was announced that Halliburton would be floating its subsidiary KBR on the stock market, this went ahead against the wishes of the UK government and Ministry of Defence as they felt the floating of KBR would make the DML group unstable. In 2004 DML acquired Appledore Shipbuilders in North Devon.

In early 2007 it was announced that the DML group was for sale and major players in the world defence industry were rumoured to be interested in buying the company from the current share holders. BAE Systems was one of the companies rumoured to be interested; The Independent on Sunday suggested that the Ministry of Defence was keen to see these combined with BAE's submarine manufacturing facilities. In the end this sale was not completed and DML was bought by Babcock International instead. Only two companies lodged bids by the closing date; Babcock International and Carlyle Group.

Babcock was announced as the successful bidder for Devonport in a deal that was worth £350 million and would secure them a 100% stake in the company. Babcock international announced that the DML Group would then become part of Babcock Marine, a new sector (of which Rosyth Dockyard is also a part) within its organisation.

The deal was approved by the Ministry of Defence at the end of June 2007.

== Devonport Yachts ==
Devonport Yachts
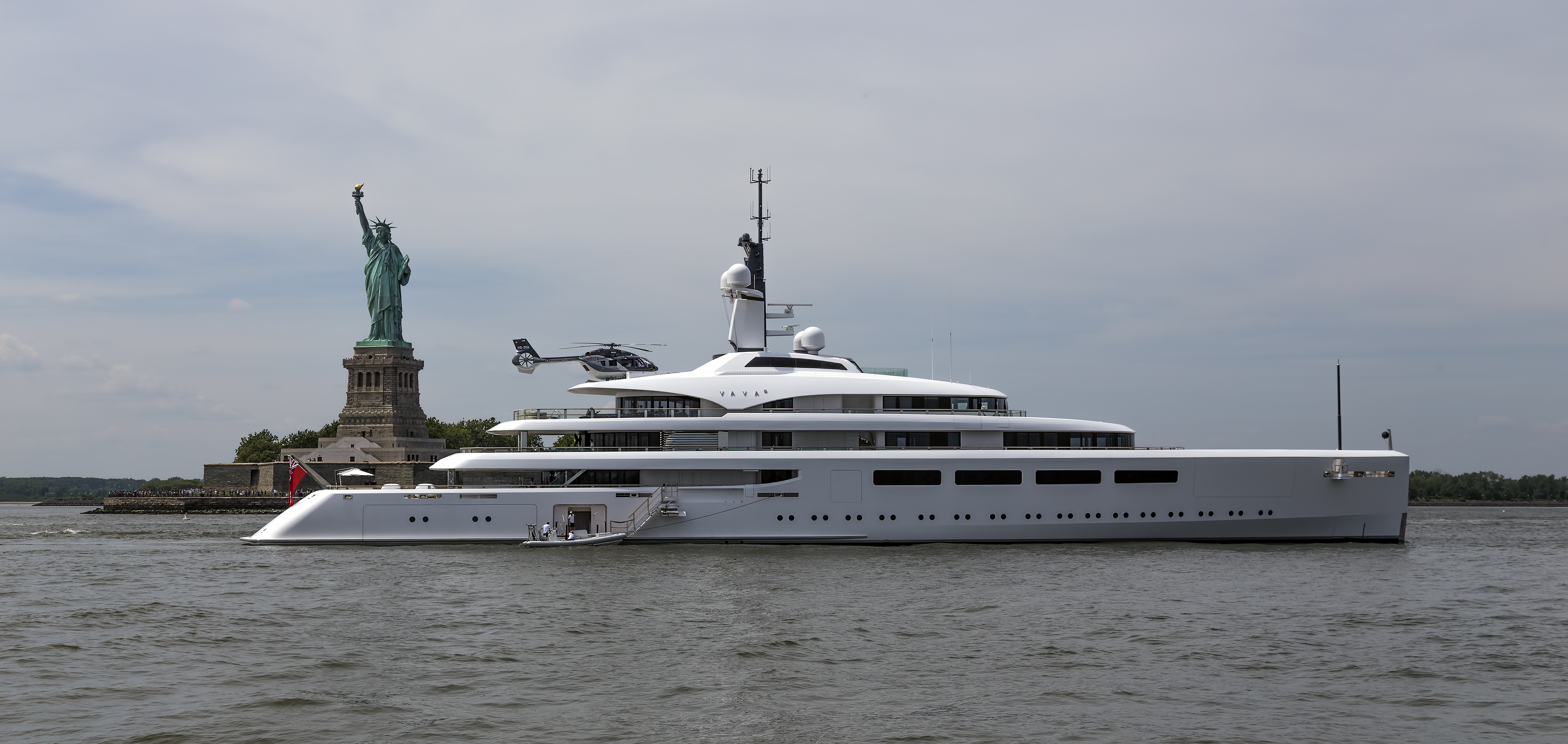
- Superyacht Vava II built by Devonport Yachts
- Type: Subsidiary
- Industry: Yacht manufacturing
- Founded: 1987; 39 years ago
- Defunct: 2011
- Fate: Acquired by Pendennis
- Key people: Stephen Hills
- Products: Superyachts

Devonport Management Limited operated Devonport Yachts, a yacht-building and refit business, at the Devonport Royal Dockyard. The yacht operation originated within the dockyard business in the late 20th century and later became a standalone company, Devonport Yachts Limited, before being acquired by Pendennis in 2010. The yard was involved in the construction, conversion or completion of several large yachts, including Samar, Sarafsa I Pure, Vava II and Alamshar.

The yacht division was formed in 1987 alongside Devonport Management Limited. The dockyard was privatized in 1997.

The yacht business developed from the dockyard's large-vessel construction and refit capabilities. One early major project was the rebuild of the classic motor yacht Talitha, which began at Devonport Management Limited in 1991 and lasted three years. Stephen Hills later headed Devonport's yacht business as it began a new-build programme in 1999.

In 2007, Babcock International acquired Devonport Management Limited and the yacht division. The following year, Babcock said Devonport would stop bidding for future yacht contracts in order to prioritize naval work at the dockyard. Devonport Yachts Limited was incorporated on March 5, 2009. Later that year, the Devonport brand had returned under private ownership, with Hills as managing director.

In February 2010, Pendennis acquired Devonport Yachts. The company was initially expected to continue operating as a sister company to Pendennis, with Hills overseeing operations. In 2011, the business rebranded to the Pendennis Plus name. This came following the christening of the Vava II, the largest motoryacht manufactured in the United Kingdom. The legal name of Devonport Yachts Limited was changed to Pendennis Plus Limited on December 21, 2011.
