= EUSTORY =

EUSTORY - History Network for Young Europeans is an international network of non-governmental organizations carrying out historical research competitions for young people. Since the network was founded in September 2001 on the initiative of the Hamburg-based Körber Foundation, some 252,000 youth have already participated in the history competitions with about 102,000 contributions. In addition to those involved in the individual national member organizations, there are about 2,500 teachers, experts, scholars and volunteers who give their time to EUSTORY and its projects.

The critical confrontation with controversial aspects of European history is the basis of the youth encounters, where prize winners from all national history competitions meet. Every year, youth from EUSTORY member countries set out on the trail of history, tracking numerous themes. The independent national history competitions encourage young people to look for traces of history in their immediate environment.

== The Network Structure ==
The EUSTORY network was established in 2001, initiated by the Körber Foundation. With its coordination office at the Körber Foundation in Hamburg, Germany, the network currently connects 23 civic organisations in 23 countries across Europe. They are: Belarus, Belgium, Bulgaria, the Czech Republic, Denmark, Estonia, Finland, Germany, Italy, Israel, Latvia, Norway, Poland, Romania, Russia, Serbia, Slovak Republic, Slovenia, Switzerland, Sweden, Spain, the Ukraine and Wales. All members agreed on a common document, the Charter, postulating the "disarmament of history", for tolerance and mutual understanding in Europe.

== Board of Patrons ==
- Jacques Delors
- Romano Prodi

Martti Ahtisaari, Sir Peter Ustinov and Johannes Rau have been Patrons in their lifetime.
