= Lucyna Kulińska =

Polish historian

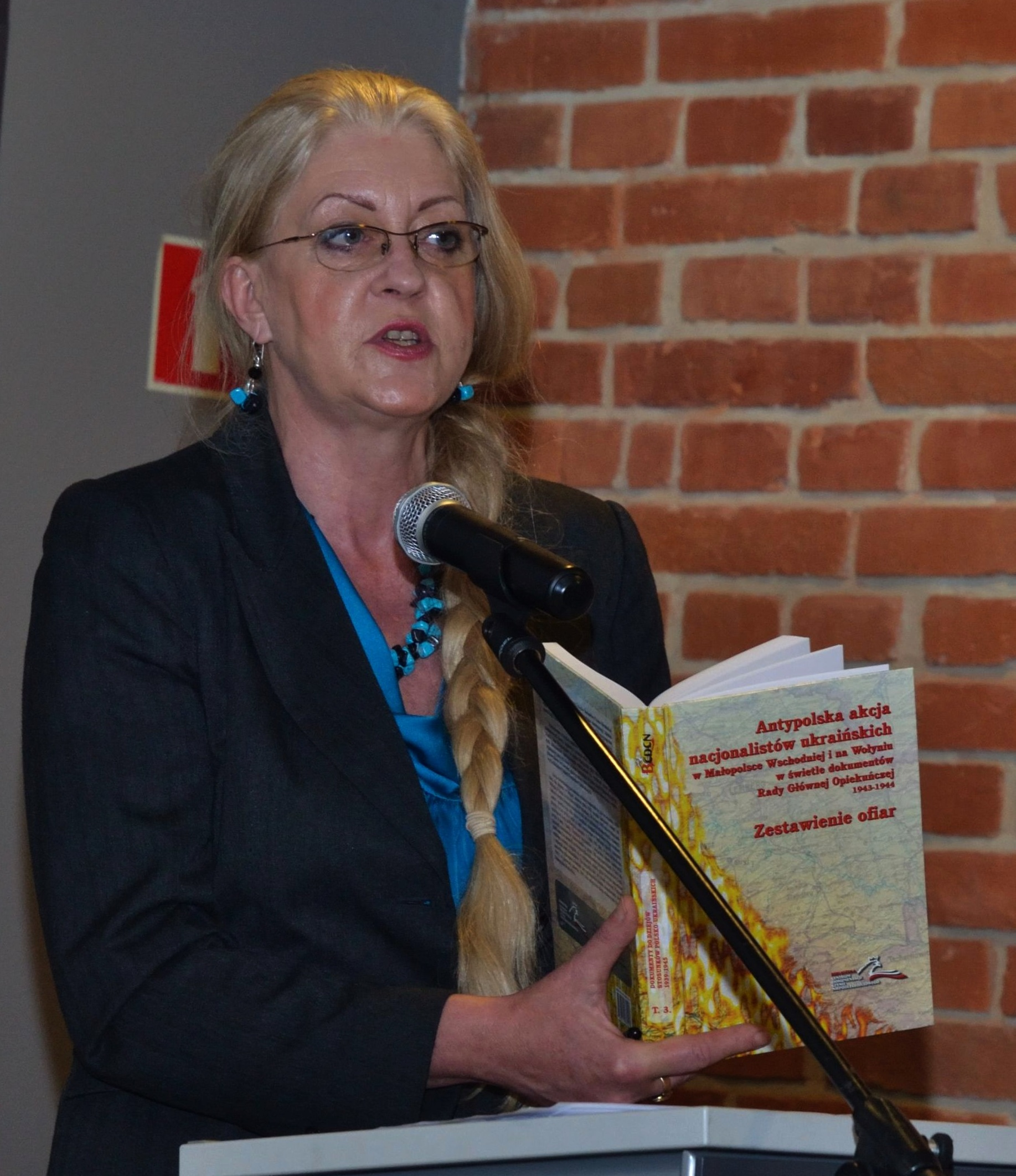
Lucyna Kulińska

Lucyna Kulińska (born 1955 in Kraków) is a Polish historian specializing in modern history and university lecturer. She has authored several books, collections of documents, publications and articles on the subject of Polish-Ukrainian relations, globalization and international relations. Lucyna Kulińska is the chairwoman of Społeczna Fundacja Pamięci Narodu Polskiego.

== Career ==
Lucyna Kulińska graduated from the Faculty of History in the Jagiellonian University in 1978. In 1997 she received a Ph.D. degree from the Pedagogical University of Cracow.

She was an assistant professor working in the Faculty of Humanities at the AGH University of Science and Technology in Kraków, as part of the Department of Political Science and Contemporary History, where she lectured on topics such as International Relations (with emphasis on Central and Eastern Europe), Contemporary Terrorism and Problems of Globalization.

She was a member of the organizing committee of the exhibition Eastern Borderlands drowning in Polish blood in the Palace of Fine Arts Kraków (Pałac Sztuki w Krakowie), organized under the auspices of the Society of the friends of the Volhynia and Polesia (Towarzystwo Miłośników Wołynia i Polesia). Her work has been published in many books, internet portals, journals and newspapers related to the Kresy (former Easter Borderlands of Poland). She is also focused on the collection of historical records related to Polish-Ukrainian relations and UPA and OUN mass genocide of Poles before, during and after the Second World War.

== Bibliography ==
- Narodowcy. Z dziejów Obozu Narodowego w Polsce w latach 1944-1947, Warszawa-Kraków 1999.
- Narodowcy. Myśl polityczna i społeczna Obozu Narodowego w Polsce w latach 1944-1947, [The nationalist politicians: political and social ideas promoted by the nationalist orientation in Poland 1944–1947], (co-authored with Mirosław Orłowski and Rafał Sierchuła), Warszawa-Kraków 2001.
- Związek Akademicki Młodzież Wszechpolska i Młodzież Wielkiej Polski w latach 1922-1947, Kraków 2000, wyd. II Warszawa 2004.
- Dzieje Komitetu Ziem Wschodnich na tle losów ludności polskich Kresów w latach 1943-1947, t. 1 i 2, [The history of Committee for Eastern Territories and the fate of Polish population in Eastern Territories in the period 1943–1947. Vol. 2 : Documents and sources gathered by Committee for Eastern Territories members and supporters], Kraków 2002, 2003.
- Antypolska akcja nacjonalistów ukraińskich w Małopolsce Wschodniej w świetle dokumentów Rady Głównej Opiekuńczej 1943-1944, [The anti-polish action of Ukrainian nationalists in Eastern Malopolska in view of Central Welfare Council files 1943–1944], (co-authored with Adam Roliński), Kraków 2003.
- Kwestia ukraińska i eksterminacja ludności polskiej w Małopolsce Wschodniej w świetle dokumentów Polskiego Państwa Podziemnego 1942-1944, [Ukrainian case and ekstermination of Polish people in Eastern Małopolska], (co-authored with Adam Roliński), Kraków 2004.
- Dzieci Kresów, [Children of South-Eastern Poland], Warszawa 2003.
- Dzieci Kresów II, [Children of South-Eastern Poland II] Kraków 2006.
- Dzieci Kresów III, [Children of South-Eastern Poland III] Kraków 2009
- Działalność terrorystyczna i sabotażowa nacjonalistycznych organizacji ukraińskich w Polsce w latach 1922-1939, [Terrorystic and nacionalist ukrainian organization in Poland in 1922-1939], Kraków 2009.
- Children of the Borderlands, 2020. (Book "Dzieci Kresów II" translated into English)
