= Perini Navi =

Italian shipyard

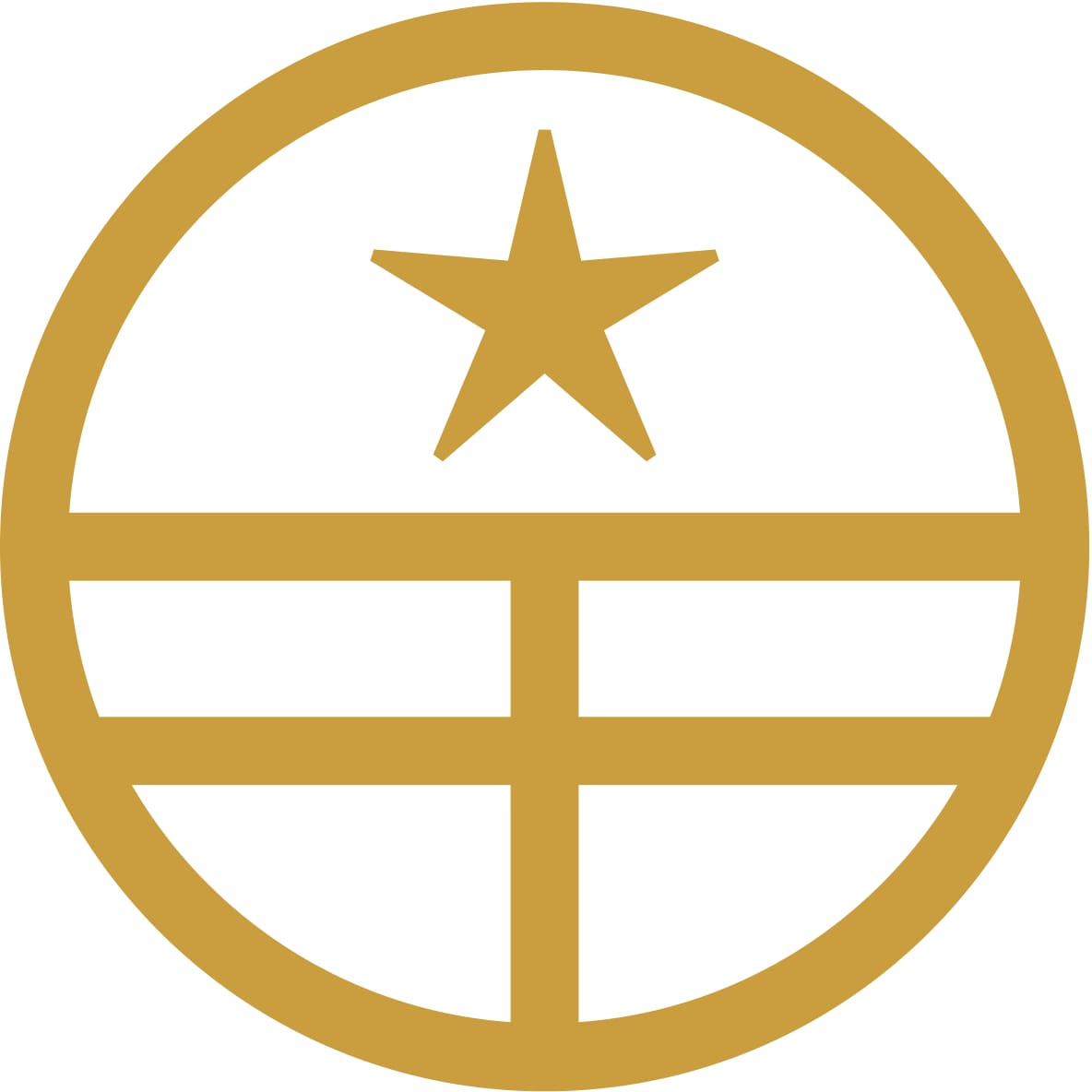
- Company type: Shipyard
- Traded as: FTSE Italia Mid Cap (The Italian Sea Group)
- Founded: 1983
- Headquarters: Viareggio, Tuscany, Italy (1983–), Marina di Carrara; Viareggio, Italy
- Area served: Viareggio
- Key people: Fabio Perini (Founder)
- Products: 25m–90m sailing yachts
- Services: new builds, refits
- Owner: The Italian Sea Group
- Parent: The Italian Sea Group
- Website: perininavi.it

Perini Navi is an Italian shipyard based in Viareggio, Tuscany, Italy. It was founded in 1983 by Fabio Perini, who pioneered automation and furling systems in large sailing yachts. The ships it built are among the world's largest.

In 2021 Perini Navi went bankrupt and it was bought by The Italian Sea Group for €80M at auction.

== See also ==
- List of large sailing yachts
- List of motor yachts by length
- Superyachts
- List of yachts built by Perini Navi
