= Körber =

Holding company in Hamburg, Germany

Körber AG
- Type: Aktiengesellschaft
- Industry: machines, software, technology
- Founded: July 14, 1946
- Founder: Kurt A. Körber
- Headquarters: Hamburg, Germany
- Key people: Stephan Seifert (Chairman of the Group Executive Board)
- Revenue: €3.1 billion (2025)
- Number of employees: 13.252 (2025)
- Website: www.koerber.com

Körber AG is a strategic management holding company based in Hamburg. In 2025, the group had more than 13,000 employees at more than 100 locations worldwide and generated sales of €3.1 billion.

== History ==
=== 1946–1992 ===
On July 14, 1946, Kurt A. Körber paved the way for the first business deals in Hamburg. On February 1, 1947, he established Hauni Maschinenfabrik Körber & Co. KG (from 1958: Hauni-Werke Körber & Co. KG). The company originally only produced machines for the tobacco industry. In 1953, it moved to a new location within Hamburg's Bergedorf district. One year later, it had more than 1,000 employees. The group's international expansion began in 1948, when Eric M. Warburg, who had been living in exile, helped Körber establish contact with American cigarette manufacturers. In 1951, Körber's machines were successful at a tobacco trade show in Amsterdam. By 1953, his company exported 80 percent of its products, and machines from Hauni plants were used in 48 countries. In 1955, the company established a plant in Richmond, Virginia, which was followed by additional facilities through the mid-1960s.

The diversification of the company began in 1970, when it purchased E. C. H. Will, a manufacturer of paper-processing machines that was based in Hamburg-Lokstedt. The new business division was strengthened in 1976 through the acquisition of Womako Maschinenkonstruktion GmbH (Stuttgart). At the request of German Chancellor Helmut Schmidt, Körber purchased the grinding machine manufacturer Blohm in Bergedorf in 1978. It served as the nucleus for the company's third business division. The acquisition of Schaudt Maschinenbau GmbH (Stuttgart and Ellwangen) in 1983 broadened its foundation.

In the mid-1980s, the group generated sales of over one billion DM for the first time. On June 17, 1987, the group was transformed into Körber AG, which absorbed Hauni-Werke Körber & Co. KG.

=== 1990–present ===
In the 1990s, the group's grinding machine segment, Schleifring, was under pressure due to restructuring costs, exchange rates, fluctuating commodity prices, and a tough price war within the sector. The business division for paper processing expanded during these years. Among other things, this was due to the acquisition of two Italian companies for the production and packaging of tissue products and the gradual purchase of a majority holding in a machine manufacturer for the production of envelopes and other paper products.

Following Körber's passing on August 10, 1992, the company's assets were transferred to the Körber Foundation. The Foundation was created on January 1, 1981, through the merger of the Kurt A. Körber Stiftung (established in 1959) and the Hauni Stiftung (established in 1969). Until Körber's death, the Foundation had held 34.9 percent of the shares. Since then, the group's annual dividend has been paid out completely to the Körber Foundation.

In 1995, Körber AG became a management holding company, which supervised the group's three business divisions at the time.

In 2002, the company entered a new market: packaging for pharmaceutical products. In the following years, this segment was expanded further through acquisitions. It has been a separate business division since 2009.

In 2012, Körber divested itself of several subsidiaries for paper processing machines, including E. C. H. Will.

As a result of a number of restructuring measures, Körber was divided into seven business divisions in 2015: Automation, Logistics Systems, Machine Tools, Pharma Systems, Tissue, Tobacco, and Corporate Ventures. In 2017, the business division Körber Digital was added. It manages the digitization of the group and the development of new digital business models. One year later, the group sold the Machine Tools and Automation business divisions. Since 2020, the group and its business divisions and companies have appeared as a single, unified brand: Körber. The only exception was the Tobacco business division, which operated on the market as the Hauni Group. From September 2022 onwards, the Hauni Group was renamed to business division Technologies.

In early 2022, Körber acquired Siemens Logistics' mail and parcel business to strengthen its Supply Chain business area. The company sold its Tissue business division to Valmet in 2023. In August 2024, the company announced that Körber Supply Chain Software, a joint venture between Körber and KKR and provider of end-to-end supply chain software solutions, would acquire MercuryGate International, a provider of transportation management systems.[32] Since March 2025, the division has been operating under the Infios brand. In March 2026, Körber entered into a technology partnership with Nvidia to develop digital twins for logistics facilities.

== Group structure ==
The group is active in three business divisions:

- Pharma offers machines for processes for the manufacturing, inspection, and packaging of medications and for the traceability of these products.
- Supply Chain focuses on technologies for production logistics. Its product range includes software, automation machines, voice applications, robotics, and transportation systems.
- Technologies is responsible for offerings in the fields of machinery, equipment, software, measuring instruments and flavors. It also develops services, particularly for the luxury food industry.
