= ActionQuest =

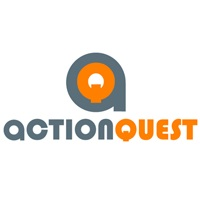
- Type: Private
- Industry: Summer Camp
- Founded: 1986
- Founders: Jim Stoll
- Headquarters: Sarasota, Florida, United States
- Area served: Worldwide
- Parent: Global Expeditions Group
- Website: https://www.actionquest.com

ActionQuest is an organization which offers adventure programs for teenagers during the months of June, July and August. These programs include sail training, marine science, and SCUBA training courses in locations throughout the Caribbean, Australia, Ecuador and the Galapagos, Tahiti, and the Mediterranean. ActionQuest is a member of the Global Expeditions Group family of brands. ActionQuest is a Tall Ships America affiliate member and participates in its annual conference in Boston.

== Mission ==
ActionQuest is an institution dedicated to "guiding diverse groups of young adults on exceptional global expeditions; challenging them with high action adventures that promote personal growth, teamwork and leadership".

== History ==
ActionQuest began running programs in the British Virgin Islands in the mid-1980s; however, its seafaring history extends back to the Flint School. In his youth before starting ActionQuest, Jim Stoll worked as an educator and sailed with his mother and father at their family preparatory school known as the Flint School. Additionally, he had the opportunity to sail with Irving and Exy Johnson, who are considered the pioneers of sea training and was inspired to continue creating sail training programs himself.

ActionQuest headquarters are located in Sarasota, Florida. A large bulk of the summer programs are run out of West End, Tortola, at Soper's Hole Marina using yachts chartered from Sunsail. Sunsail has since moved its charter base from West End to Hodge's Creek and finally to Road Town in 2007. ActionQuest continues to charter boats through them.

When the founder's son decided to complete his goal of sailing around the world, he sailed to various locations in which ActionQuest later decided to expand their programs. By the late 1990s, ActionQuest included programs in satellite locations such as Tahiti and French Polynesia, Fiji, Australia, and the Galapagos.

In 2006, ActionQuest's sister company Sea|mester built the 112-foot staysail schooner Argo for college students; however, in the summertime, programs are opened to high school teenagers to sail aboard in either the Mediterranean or the Western Pacific.

ActionQuest uses PADI certified scuba instructors and offers courses from Open Water Diver through Divemaster. ActionQuest also works with International Yachtmaster Training (IYT) for sailing certifications. The Majority of students gain an Open Water certification in the British Virgin Islands. Marine Biology is also offered for high school credit in the BVI's. [3]

From ActionQuest grew two other institutions, Seamester Global Programs and GoBeyond Student Travel. Sea|mester owns three schooners, Ocean Star and Argo and Vela to run full-time training programs for college students around the world. GoBeyond Student Travel runs community-service based programs in the British Virgin Islands, Australia, China, Galapagos, Costa Rica, and Thailand.

== Awards ==
- Sea Education Program of the Year Award from Tall Ships America 2011
- PADI Recognition of Excellence
- PADI 20 Years of Outstanding Service
