= List of ships named Argo =

Several vessels have been named Argo for the ship Argo of Greek mythology. Such ships are listed below in ascending chronology.

- Argo (1800 ship) was an American schooner that was wrecked in Fiji during January 1800.
- Argo (1804 ship) was launched in 1802 in France, possibly under another name, and captured c.1804. She became a whaler in the British Southern Whale Fishery and made two complete whale hunting voyages. A US Navy frigate captured her on her third voyage.
- Argo (1806 Chittagong ship) was built in 1806 at Chittagong, present-day Bangladesh. She was registered in Calcutta to Payne & Tyrce. She disappeared in 1814 off the coast of Tasmania after having been "run away with" by convicts.
- Argo (1806 Liverpool ship) was built in France in 1783 and was taken in prize circa 1806. She sailed as a slave ship and was lost on the coast of Africa before she had acquired any slaves.
- Argo (1807 ship) was launched at Whitby as a West Indiaman. She made one voyage to India under a license from the British East India Company (EIC). Thereafter she traded between Liverpool and Miramichi, New Brunswick. She was last listed in 1824 and may have foundered in June 1824.
- SV Argo (1841)
- Argo (1853 ship) was an iron screw steamer. She was the first screw steamship to circumnavigate the Earth.
- Argo (barge) was a tank barge that sank in Lake Erie in October 1937.
- Argo (2006 ship) is a two-masted Marconi rigged schooner. She was built in 2006 in Samut Prakan, Thailand at Marsun Shipyards. She is owned and operated by Seamester Study Abroad Programs as one of two sail training vessels the company operates.
- Italian ship Argo, several ships of the Italian Navy

Argo is also the name of a deep-sea exploration sled, most famous for its role in the discovery of the wreck of RMS Titanic.
