= Global Expeditions Group =

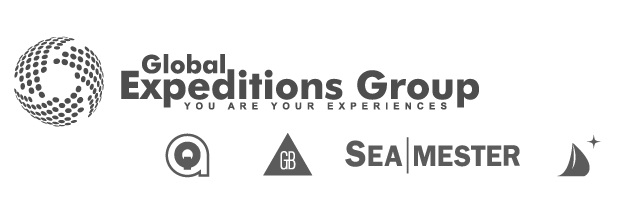
- Type: Private
- Headquarters: Sarasota, Florida, United States
- Key people: Mike Meighan CEO
- Brands: Seamester; ActionQuest; GoBeyond Student Travel
- Website: https://globalexpeditionsgroup.com

Global Expeditions Group, or GXG, is the parent company of the Sea|mester, ActionQuest, and GoBeyond Student Travel brands. The company's origins began in 1985 with ActionQuest some years after its founder Jim Stoll left the Flint School. Over the course of the next 40 years ActionQuest expanded into several other brands including ARC, Sirius Sailing, Lifeworks International, and Sea|mester. In 2012 Global Expeditions Group was formed to organize all of the brands that had grown out of ActionQuest under one parent company.

== GXG Foundation ==
The GXG Foundation is a non-profit Private Foundation created to provide scholarships and financial aid for students seeking to join an ActionQuest, Sea|mester or GoBeyond (formerly Lifeworks International) program.

== Family of Brands ==
ActionQuest - Summer adventure programs for teenagers

Go Beyond Student Travel - Community service travel programs for teenagers

Sea|mester - Study abroad college program for university students and gap year students

Sirius Sailing - Adult Sailing Programs
