= Black Douglas =

Black Douglas may refer to:

== People ==
- James Douglas, Lord of Douglas (c. 1286–1330), companion in arms of Robert I of Scotland
- Archibald Douglas, 3rd Earl of Douglas, called Archibald the Grim or Black Archibalde (c. 1330 – c. 1400), 3rd Earl of Douglas
- Any Earl of Douglas until their forfeiture in 1455

== Others ==
- Schooner Black Douglas, a ship built in 1930
- The Black Douglas (novel), by S. R. Crockett
