= Artaiouteichos =

Greek town located near the coast of the Propontis in ancient Mysia

Coordinates: 40°22′00″N 28°28′42″E

Artaiouteichos (Ancient Greek: Ἀρταίων τεῖχος) was a Greek town located near the coast of the Propontis in ancient Mysia. According to the historian Craterus, it was located on the banks of the river Rhyndacus. The first part of the town's name was of Persian origin, the second part means 'wall' in Greek. The town belonged to the Delian League since it appears in the tribute registry of Athens for the years 425/4 and 422/1 BCE where it had to pay a phoros of 1000 drachmae.

It has been suggested that it could be the same city that Pliny the Elder mentions by the name of Ariace but most scholars consider that the Ariace of Pliny should be identified with Artace.

Its site is located on the lower Rhyndacus.
