= Messier 93 =

Open cluster in the constellation Puppis

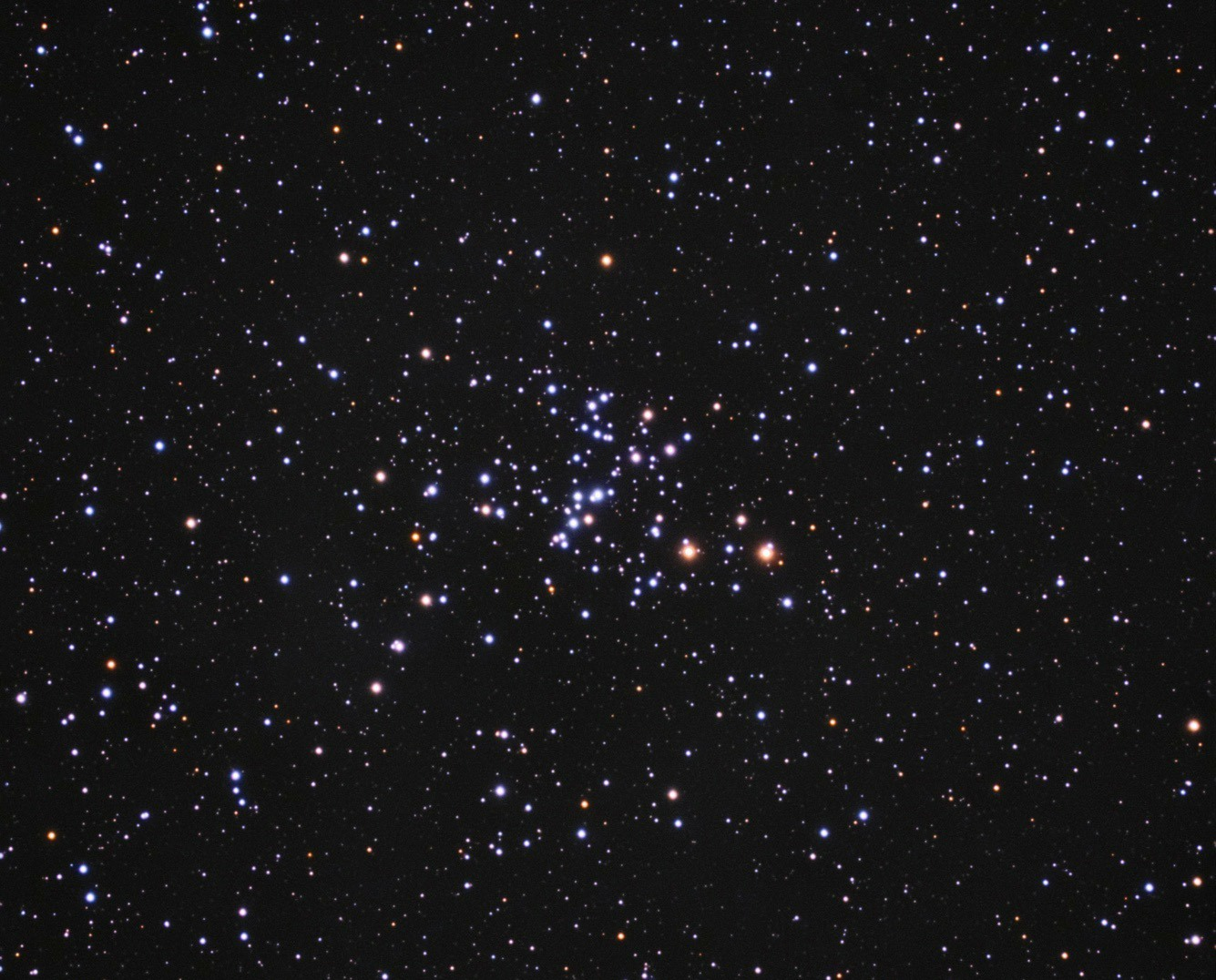
- Open cluster Messier 93 in Puppis

Observation data (J2000.0 epoch)
- Right ascension: 07^{h} 44^{m} 30.0^{s}
- Declination: −23° 51′ 24″
- Distance: 3.38 kly (1.037 kpc)
- Apparent magnitude (V): 6.0
- Apparent dimensions (V): 10′

Physical characteristics
- Mass: 723 M_{☉}
- Radius: 10 ly
- Estimated age: 387.3 Myr
- Other designations: NGC 2447, Cr 160, OCl 649.0

Associations
- Constellation: Puppis

Messier 93 or M93, also known as NGC 2447 or the Critter Cluster, is an open cluster in the modestly southern constellation Puppis, the imagined poop deck of the legendary Argo.

== Observational history and appearance ==
It was discovered by Charles Messier then added to his catalogue of comet-like objects in 1781. (Note: On March 20) Caroline Herschel, the younger sister of William Herschel, independently discovered it in 1783, thinking it had not yet been catalogued by Messier.

Walter Scott Houston (died 1993) described its appearance:

Some observers mention the cluster as having the shape of a starfish. With a fair-sized telescope, this is its appearance on a dull night, but [a four-inch refractor] shows it as a typical star-studded galactic cluster.

== Properties ==
It has a Trumpler class of I 3 r, indicating it is strongly concentrated (I) with a large range in brightness (3) and is rich in stars (r).

M93 is about 3,380 light-years from the solar radius and has a great spatial radius of 10 light-years, a tidal radius of 13.1±2.3 ly, and a core radius of 4.2 ly. Its age is estimated at 387.3 million years. It is nearly on the galactic plane and has an orbit that varies between 28–29 kly (8.5–8.9 kpc) from the Galactic Center over a period of 242.7±7.9 Myr.

Fifty-four variable stars have been found in M93, including one slowly pulsating B-type star, one rotating ellipsoidal variable, seven Delta Scuti variables, six Gamma Doradus variables, and one hybrid δ (Note: Delta Scuti) Sct/γ Dor (Note: Gamma Doradus) pulsator. Four spectroscopic binary systems within include a yellow straggler component.

== Gallery ==
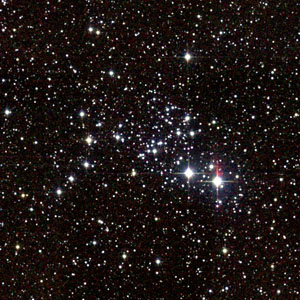
Messier 93 atlas image

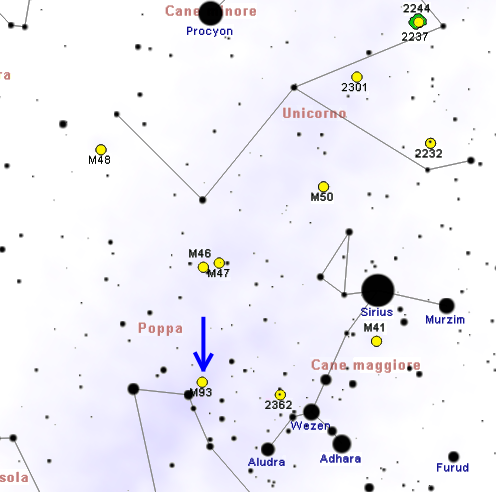
Finder chart for M93

== See also ==
- List of Messier objects
