= GoBeyond Student Travel =

- Formerly: Lifeworks International
- Type: Private
- Industry: Service Learning Organization
- Founded: 2003
- Founders: Jim Stoll; Mike Meighan
- Headquarters: Sarasota, Florida, United States
- Area served: Worldwide
- Parent: Global Expeditions Group
- Website: https://www.gobeyondtravel.com

GoBeyond Student Travel is an organization which offers community service based adventure programs during the Northern Hemisphere summertime to teenagers. Programs are run in the British Virgin Islands, Ecuador and the Galapagos, Thailand, China, Costa Rica, India, Peru and Australia.

== History ==
GoBeyond grew from the experience of its sister institutions, ActionQuest and Seamester, with a decided aim on global community service. After the events of September 11, 2001, ActionQuest decided to develop a program aimed at service, which became GoBeyond Student Travel.

GoBeyond ran its first programs in 2003 in the British Virgin Islands, Australia, and the Galapagos. In 2004, GoBeyond Thailand began, and in 2005, GoBeyond China and Costa Rica began. In 2010, GoBeyond expanded offerings to India and Peru.
