= Ocean Star (disambiguation) =

Ocean Star was an Australian children's television series.

Ocean Star or Ocean Starr may also refer to:

- Ocean Star (schooner), a schooner built in 1991
- Ocean Star Offshore Drilling Rig & Museum in Galveston, Texas, USA
- R/V Ocean Starr, an American oceanographic research ship that formerly served in the National Oceanic and Atmospheric Administration fleet as NOAAS David Starr Jordan (R 444)
