= Schooner Te Vega =

German auxiliary schooner

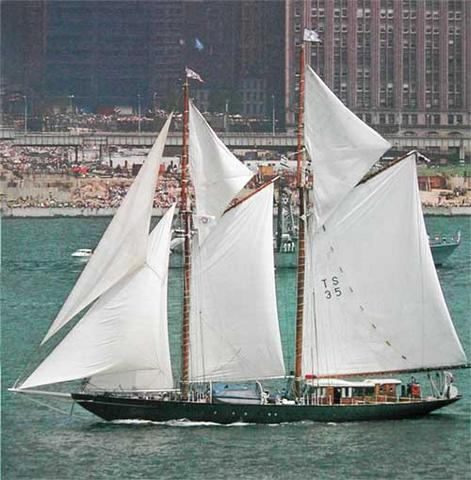
- Operation Sail 1976: T/S Te Vega on the Hudson River.

History
- Name: Etak
- Builder: Friedrich Krupp Germaniawerft Kiel, Germany
- Launched: 1930
- Identification: MMSI number: 232030742; Callsign: MIFU9

United States
- Name: Juniata IX-77
- Namesake: Juniata River
- Operator: US Navy
- Acquired: 1942
- In service: 11 August 1942
- Out of service: 1 January 1945
- Fate: Sold to civilian

General characteristics
- Type: Gaff-rigged auxiliary schooner
- Tonnage: 242
- Length: 137 ft (42 m)
- Beam: 28 ft 2 in (8.59 m)
- Draft: 17 ft 5 in (5.31 m)
- Propulsion: Built with a 200-hp Winton marine diesel engine; Replaced by a 400-hp English Mirrlees in the 1950s; From the mid-1990s a 700-hp German MTU
- Speed: 11 kn (20 km/h; 13 mph)

Te Vega is a two-masted, gaff-rigged auxiliary schooner. Originally launched as the Etak, she was designed by New York naval architects Cox & Stevens in 1929 for American businessman Walter Graeme Ladd and his wife, Catherine ("Kate") Everit Macy Ladd. Etak ("Kate" spelled backwards) was built at the Friedrich Krupp Germaniawerft shipyard in Kiel, Germany, and launched in 1930. During World War II she served the US Navy as Juniata (IX-77). She is among the largest steel-hulled schooners afloat.

== History ==
The Etak has been renamed several times, her subsequent names being Vega, USS Juniata and Te Vega. She is currently Deva.

The ship has changed hands over fifteen times and has undertaken a variety of functions: private yacht, United States Navy patrol vessel during World War II, charter yacht in the West Indies and French Polynesia, research vessel for Stanford University's Hopkins Marine Station, and school ship for seaborne prep school the Flint School. She is one of the many tall ships to have appeared in a feature film, the cinerama travelogue South Seas Adventure.

Some of the ship's more colorful owners have been Adolph Dick of the Dick sugar and banking family of New York; Hans-Wilhelm Röhl, co-owner of the Rohl-Connolly Co. (builder of the Port of Los Angeles breakwaters) and investigated in 1942 for pro-Nazi sympathies; aviation pioneer Thomas F. Hamilton; Crane Co. heir Cornelius Crane; renowned Honolulu-based skipper Omer Darr; Stimson Lumber Company scion Harold Miller; Dutch financier (and kundalini yoga teacher) Pieter Schoonheim Samara; and Calisto Tanzi, ex-chairman of the Parmalat group. In January 2006 she was sold to Italian fashion magnate Diego Della Valle (Tod's et al.).

She was built with a 200-hp American Winton marine diesel engine, which was replaced by a 400-hp English Mirrlees in the 1950s. From the mid-1990s she has had a 700-hp German MTU. Launched with a black hull, she has had white and dark blue hulls as well. She has flown the flags of the United States, France, Liberia, Panama, The Netherlands, and Italy (current).

=== World War II service ===
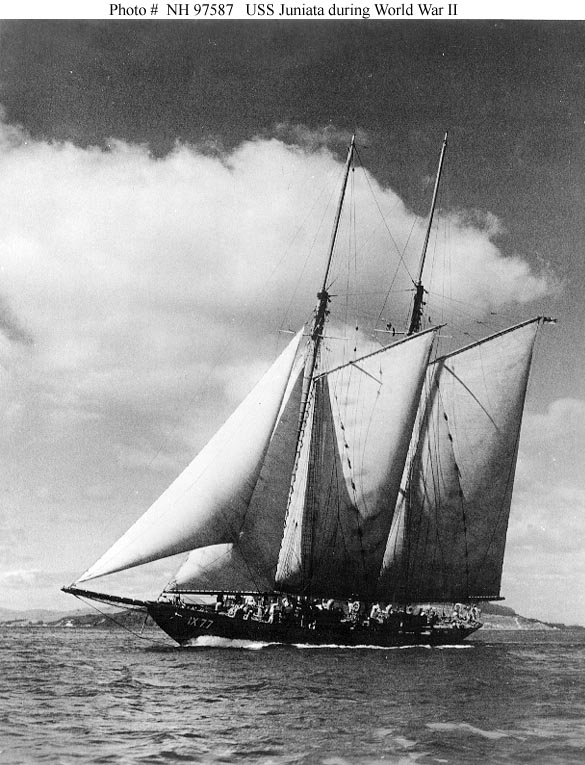
USS Juniata on San Francisco Bay off Angel Island during World War II

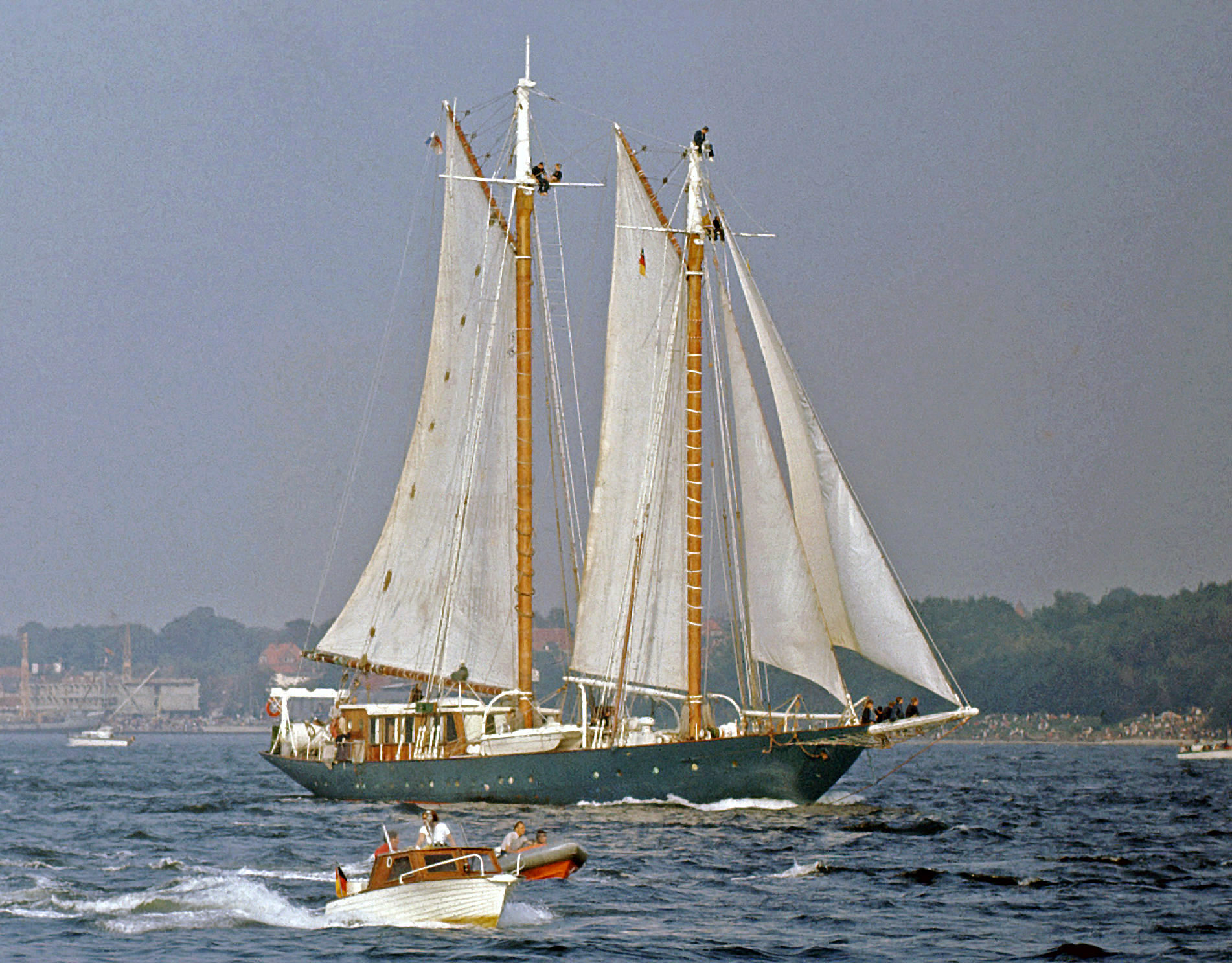
Te Vega at Windjammer Parade 1972 in Kiel

==== Army controversy ====
Allegations were made that Army officers involved in construction of Pacific air ferry routes and bases prior to the war mismanaged the effort and had improper associations with Röhl, particularly with respect to the proposed charter of his yacht Vega as a survey vessel.

==== Navy ====
The yacht, then named Vega, was offered by Röhl to the United States Coast Guard and accepted on July 9, 1942. Subsequently, Vega was acquired by the US Navy from H. W. Röhl in 1942, renamed Juniata and designated (IX-77). The vessel was placed in service on August 11.

Juniata was assigned to the Western Sea Frontier and was based at San Francisco, California. She alternated with other ships on patrol for the great circle route to Hawaii, sailing to and from her station some 500 miles west of Eureka, California. Juniata was placed out of service at Treasure Island, San Francisco, California, on 1 January 1945, returned to the Maritime Commission, and sold to Thomas Hamilton in June 1945.

== National Science Foundation ship ==
The National Science Foundation converted the ship in 1964 for use as a research vessel to be operated by Stanford University. The ship was sold in 1969, replaced by the Proteus.

== In the press ==
- Untitled Winton Engine Company advertisement with photo (The Rudder, May 1930).
- "Diesel Yachts" [Cox & Stevens brochure, 1930].
- "Die Schonerjachten ‚Cressida' und ‚Étak', erbaut auf der Fried. Krupp..." (Schiffbau – Schiffahrt und Hafenbau, January 1, 1931).
- "Modern Sailing Dream Becomes Reality Today" (Bennington Evening Banner, June 10, 1955).
- "Cinerama Going to South Pacific" (New York Times, June 12, 1957).
- "Looking for Local Color in the South Seas" (New York Times, June 17, 1959).
- "New Vacation Ideas" (Kiplinger's Personal Finance, June 1960).
- "Antigua Island Invites Tourists" (St. Petersburg, Florida, Evening Independent, December 26, 1961).
- "Annual Report of the Board of Regents of the Smithsonian Institution" [publication 4613, 1965].
- "Schooner Te Vega Berths at Suva" (Fiji Times, April 28, 1965).
- "Te Vega Cruises" (Plant Science Bulletin, No. 112, July 15, 1965).
- "Birds Observed on Various Polynesian Islands aboard the Research Ship Te Vega" (Elepaio, No. 27, 1966).
- "Aspects of the Physiology of Terrestrial Life in Amphibious Fishes" (Journal of Experimental Biology, No. 50, 1969).
- "Nitrogen Uptake by Phytoplankton in the Discontinuity Layer of the Eastern Subtropical Pacific Ocean" (Limnology and Oceanography, September 1970).
- "Studies on the fauna associated with the deep scattering layer (DSL) in the equatorial Indian Ocean, conducted on R/V TE VEGA during October and November 1964" [proceedings of an international symposium on biological sound-scattering in the ocean, 1972].
- "Te Vega: Teaching School on the Sea" (Saint Petersburg Times, August 24, 1972).
- "The Living Ship Still Lives" (Yachting, January 1973).
- "Rolf L. Bolin, Marine Biologist, Stanford Professor, Dies" (New York Times, August 24, 1973).
- "»Quite normal pupils« ... nur ganz billig ist für sie die schwimmende Schule nicht" (Kieler Chronik, October 4, 1974).
- "Jovens americanos gostaram de ver brasileiro sempre sorrindo" (A Província do Pará, April 15, 1975).
- "Ecology of Conus on Eastern Indian Ocean Fringing Reefs" (Marine Biology, March 1975).
- "Bermuda Gets an Early Taste of Tall Ship Fever" (Royal Gazette, May 27, 1976).
- Cover photo (The Bermudian, August 1976).
- "Marine Algae of the Te Vega 1965 Expedition in the Western Pacific Ocean" (Atoll Research Bulletin, No. 209, May 1977).
- "Eine komplette höhere Schule kam unter Schonersegeln nach Lübeck" (Lübecker Nachrichten, October 28, 1977).
- "Te Vega in Leningrad" (The Yacht, June 1986).
- "Te Vega in the Mediterranean" (Sea History, Autumn 1986).
- "Making Headway Aboard Te Vega" (SAIL, November 1986).
- "Tweemastschoener TE VEGA onder Nederlandse vlag" (Spiegel der Zeilvaart, issue No. 1, 1988).
- "An East-West Sail For the Environment" (New York Times, June 5, 1989).
- "US-Soviet Environmental Project Develops Into Cultural Success" (Boston Globe, September 10, 1989).
- "Tweemastschoener TE VEGA van klassiek jacht tot schoolschip" (Spiegel der Zeilvaart, issue No. 8, 1990).
- "The International Program of Research on Latimeria in the 1960s" (Environmental Biology of Fishes, April 1993).
- "Benthic Marine Algae from the Maldives, Indian Ocean, Collected During the R/V Te Vega Expedition" (Contributions from the University of Michigan Herbarium, Vol. 19, May 1993).
- "Refitting del Te Vega" (Nautica – Mensile internazionale di navigazione, November 1996).
- "«Te Vega», una nuova stella per il RINA" (Registro Italiano Navale press release, 1998).
- "Omer Courtney Darr" (San Francisco Chronicle obituary, October 26, 1999).
- "Décès d'Omer Darr, pionnier du tourisme de luxe à la voile" (Tahiti-Pacifique, November 1999).
- "Exploring Neptune's gardens: From landlubber to reef biologist" (Atoll Research Bulletin Golden Issue 1951–2001, 2002).
- "An Affair to Remember" (SAIL, August 2003).
- "La scheda: il Te Vega" (Corriere della Sera, January 28, 2004).
- "Tanzi implica a banqueros, políticos y Policía fiscal" (ABC, January 29, 2004).
- "Yachtverlust" (Financial Times Deutschland, April 7, 2005).
- "Della Valle acquista lo yacht di Tanzi" (Corriere della Sera, January 21, 2006).
- "A Diego Della Valle il 'Te Vega' di Tanzi" (Città della Spezia, January 23, 2006).
- "In cantiere a Genova il «Te Vega» e altri 5 scafi d'epoca" (ANSA, February 2, 2006).
- "Большая мировая вода" (Novaya Gazeta monthly color supplement, May 2006).
- "Ban bèk – Barku di bella" (Èxtra Boneiru [Bonaire, Neth. Antilles], August 8, 2006).
- "Capri, aperitivo e tuffo per il Ministro" (Capri Press, August 14, 2007).
- "Top 200 – Die größten Segelyachten" (Boote supplement, Sept./Oct. 2007).
- "Historia de la investigación marina de la Isla del Coco, Costa Rica" (Revista de Biología Tropical, August 2008).
- "Vigilance at Sea" (California Yacht Club's Breeze newsletter, October 2008).

== In books ==
- Report of the Army Pearl Harbor Board (Washington: United States Army, 1945).
- Give Me a Ship to Sail (London: Hodder & Stoughton, 1958).
- Many Lagoons (New York: William Morrow & Co., 1958).
- Inoubliables Lagons (2010 Tahiti editeur Lagoons & Islands)
- Tahiti (New York: Viking Press, 1962).
- Two-Thirds of a Coconut Tree (New York: Little, Brown & Co., 1963).
- Te Vega Expeditions, Cruise Narratives (Pacific Grove: Hopkins Marine Station, 1963).
- Danske ekspeditioner på verdenshavene (Copenhagen: Rhodos, 1967).
- Windjammer Lübeck – Kiel 1972 (Herford: Koehlers Verlagsgesellschaft, 1972).
- Windjammer Parade 1972 (Hamburg: Gerhard-Stalling-Verlag, 1972).
- The Tall Ships: Official OpSail '76 Portfolio (New York: Sabine Press, 1976).
- Les Antilles aujourd'hui (Paris: Éditions JA, 1979).
- Beken of Cowes: A Century of Tall Ships (London: Harrap, 1985).
- Les grands voiliers à Bordeaux (Paris: Burdin, 1990).
- Catalogue of the Benthic Marine Algae of the Indian Ocean (Los Angeles: University of California Press, 1996).
- In the Spirit of Tradition – Old and New Classic Yachts (New York: W.W. Norton, 1997).
- The Superyachts – Vol. 11 (Kingston upon Thames: Boat International Publications, 1998).
- 50 Years of Ocean Discovery (Washington: National Academies Press, 2000).
- Vele d'Epoca nel mondo (Milan: Edizioni Gribaudo, 2002).
- Oceanographic History: The Pacific and Beyond (Seattle: University of Washington Press, 2002).
- Pride of the Sea: Courage, Disaster, and a Fight for Survival (Seacaucus: Citadel Press, 2004).
- Fred Terman at Stanford: Building a Discipline, a University, and Silicon Valley (Stanford: Stanford University Press, 2004).
- Chapman's Great Sailing Ships of the World (New York: Hearst, 2005).
- View From the Top of the Mast ([self-published], 2006).
- Vele allo specchio (Milan: Mondadori, 2006).
- More Curious Than Cautious ([self-published], 2010).
- Te Vega – The Story of a Schooner and Her People ([self-published], 2011).
- Perceptions of a Camino (Göte Nyman, 2014).

== In paintings ==
- Thomas Wells: Vega and Zaca.
- Thomas Wells: Schooner Vega on a Trans-Pac.
- Anthony Brandrett: Yachting Off Cowes.

== In moving images ==
- The Tahitian (privately made by Cornelius Crane; 1956).
- South Seas Adventure (New York premier July 15, 1958).
- "Soviet-American Sail" (America's Defense Monitor; original air date June 24, 1990).
