= Dawes Point Battery =

- Dawes Point, Sydney, New South Wales in Australia
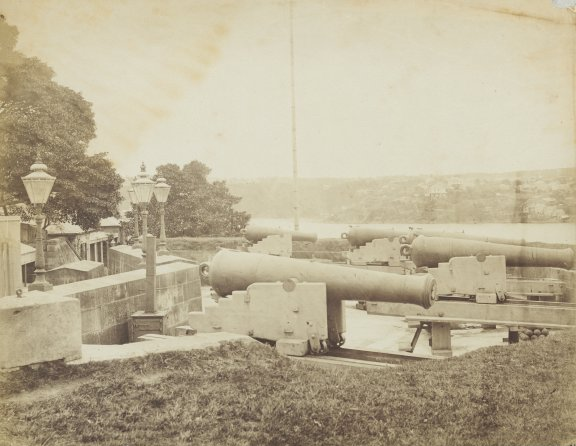
- Dawes Point Battery

Site information
- Type: Gun battery
- Condition: Demolished between 1925 and 1932; remains only

Location
- Location in Sydney central business district
- Coordinates: 33.854945°S 151.209404°E

Site history
- Built: 1791
- Built by: William Dawes; Robert Ross; Francis Greenway; George Barney
- Materials: Sandstone
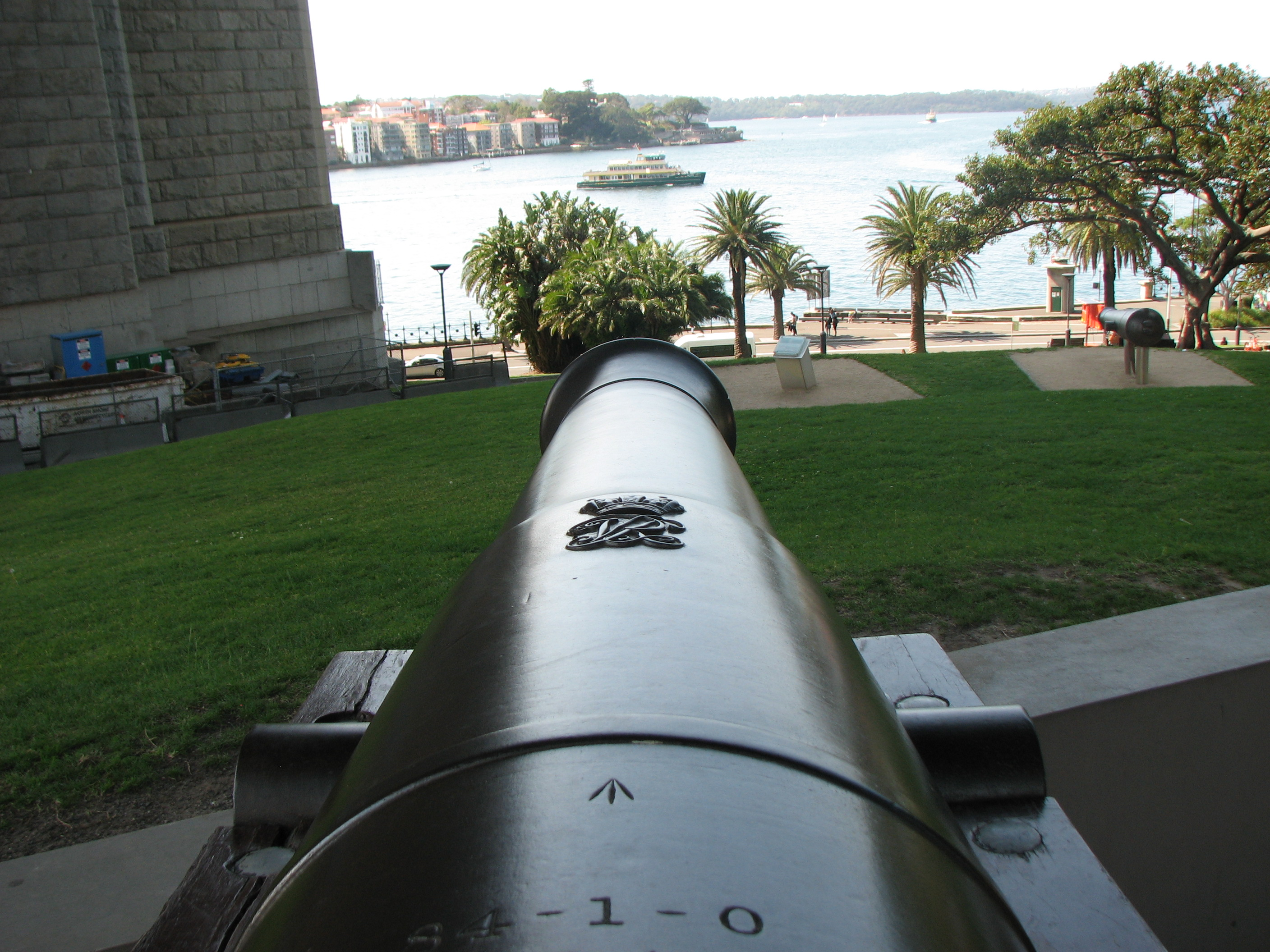
- Cannons at the Dawes Point "Tarra" interpretive park
- Location: Hickson Road, The Rocks, City of Sydney, New South Wales, Australia

History
- Built: 1791–1925
- Built for: NSW Colonial Government

Site notes
- Owner: Property NSW

New South Wales Heritage Register
- Official name: Dawes Point Battery remains
- Type: State heritage (built)
- Designated: 10 May 2002
- Reference no.: 1543
- Type: Battery
- Category: Defence

The Dawes Point Battery remains is a heritage-listed former artillery fortification and now visitor attraction located adjacent to the southern pylon of the Sydney Harbour Bridge at Hickson Road in inner city Sydney, on the boundary between Dawes Point and The Rocks in the City of Sydney local government area of New South Wales, Australia. It was built and modified from 1791 to 1925 by Lieutenant William Dawes, Robert Ross, Francis Greenway, and George Barney. The property is owned by Property NSW, an agency of the Government of New South Wales. It was added to the New South Wales State Heritage Register on 10 May 2002.

== History ==
Dawes Point is a prominent landmark in Sydney Harbour, terminating the western arm of Sydney Cove. It has a rich documented history beginning with one of the earliest recorded cultural exchanges between the Eora Aboriginals and the First Fleet. Subsequently, it remained in government ownership both as a place of strategic administration, defence and transport and as a place contributing to the magnificent landscape of our harbour city. The Point forms part of Sydney's historic Rocks precinct.

The first known building to be constructed on the site of Point Maskelyne (later renamed Dawes Point) was an observatory constructed in early 1788 by Lieutenant William Dawes, of the Royal Marines. A powder magazine was installed in 1789 followed by the battery in 1791. The first guns came from HMS Sirius, which had wrecked at Norfolk Island the year before. A dispute in 1790 between Spain and Britain, leading to fear of a Spanish attack, motivated the project. In 1798, the Governor's concerns regarding the arrival of schooner Argo prompted defensive measures at the Battery. George Barney, one of Australia's most important colonial engineers of the mid-19th century, oversaw the construction. The site had previously been used as a cemetery for prisoners executed at Sydney Gaol (1797-c. 1830).

In 1810, Napoleon ordered the French forces at Île de France to launch an attack on Sydney. However, the Royal Navy captured the island, forestalling any attack.

During the Napoleonic Wars, French and Spanish ships captured in the Pacific Ocean and brought into Sydney harbour received salutes from the battery. The fort was expanded substantially in 1819 when Governor Lachlan Macquarie ordered convict Francis Greenway, who was an architect, to design and construct improvements. The result was a semicircular battery, supported by a new, decorative castellated guardhouse built on the site of the 1780 powder magazine, which now provided the guardhouse's basement. The elaborate defenses were meant to appear threatening to ships sailing into Sydney Harbour. In that same year sandstone blocks were quarried on site at Dawes Point Park for the construction of the fort.

The fort was expanded substantially in 1819. Further buildings were constructed in the 1850s and at the end of the century. The site had also been used as a cemetery for prisoners executed at Old Sydney Gaol (1797-c. 1830). The Aroostook War, a confrontation in 1838–1839 between the United States and the United Kingdom over the international boundary between the British colony of New Brunswick and the US state of Maine, raised concerns over the harbour's defenses. The arrival of two American sloops during the night, however peaceful, highlighted the colony's vulnerability.

The Russian success in repulsing an Anglo-French force in the Siege of Petropavlovsk, in the northern Pacific during the Crimean War (1854–56), raised concerns that the Russian Pacific Fleet would attack Sydney. At the time New South Wales was undergoing an economic boom following the discovery of gold. The colonial government enlarged Fort Macquarie and Dawes Point, constructed further fortifications at Kirribilli and Mrs Macquarie's Chair, and finished Fort Denison. Dawes Point received additional subterranean powder magazines and the Royal Artillery provided a garrison. Dawes Point Battery also became the command post for the fortifications around the inner harbor.

Colonel George Barney was given the task renovating Sydney's fortifications and an extension of Dawes Point in 1860.

Sydney's Harbour defences had been relocated to the entrance of Port Jackson by the end of the 19th century, thus rendering Dawes Point obsolete. The battery was then used to store the Commandant of the Australian Military from 1901 and 1903.

Most of the fort was demolished in 1925 to make way for the construction of the Sydney Harbour Bridge. In 1932 the remaining buildings that served as a headquarters for Dorman and Long, the British company responsible for the construction of the Sydney Harbour Bridge were demolished and the whole area landscaped and set aside for public use.

In 1995 archaeological investigations were carried out at the Battery site, and the findings were incorporated into a new interpretive park which was opened to the public in 2001. The park was named "Dawes Point|Tarra" acknowledging the Cadigal name for the area.

== Description ==
The archaeological remains of the Dawes Point Battery (1791-1925) have been excavated during the past few years. They include the floor of the original powder magazine, the circular battery with evidence of 4 gun emplacements (5th emplacement probably under the path), underground magazines, a stone ramp and the footings of the officers' quarters.

Five 42-pounder cannons, muzzle loading, one on replica wooden carriage installed on an original emplacement the other four are not in situ and without carriages. Manufactured in 1843–1844, as indicated by date stamps on metal work. Built by 1788.

=== Condition ===
As at 3 November 2000, the first known building on the site was Dawes' observatory built in early 1788. A powder magazine was constructed in 1789 followed by the Battery in 1791. It was expanded substantially in 1819. Further buildings were constructed in the 1850s and at the end of the century. The site had also been used as a cemetery for prisoners executed at Old Sydney Gaol (1797-c. 1830). All buildings were levelled between 1925 and 1932 during the construction of the Sydney Harbour Bridge.

The archaeological remains revealed to date are unparalleled in Australia because they represent a broad range of significant historical periods. Archaeological sites from the 18th century are exceedingly rare with only the remains of First Government House and parts of the Dockyard on the western side of the Cove bearing witness to the first 10 years of white settlement in the Sydney CBD. Only a handful of the colonial architect Francis Greenway's structures survive. With the excavation of the semi-circular battery floor an interesting part of his work has been rediscovered. Greenway's quarry on the site is a good example of the careful mining of stone from this period in Sydney. The archaeology of the Battery floor and underground magazines also reveals elements constructed under the direction of George Barney, one of Australia's most important Colonial Engineers in the mid 19th century, such as the 1850s gun emplacements. Together with the presence of movable heritage associated with the site, the Battery is an important archive of military history. The archaeological remains also have a strong aesthetic appeal as evocative ruins of Australia's colonial past.

Battery exposed in 1995, along with remains of Officers Quarters (1856) and parts of Guardhouse (1819–1830s). Some remains of 1789 magazine and pre-1819 battery also revealed. Remains subject to conservation and interpretation 1997–98. Interpretive park opened 2000. The lower battery has not been excavated and represents a significant archaeological resource. The archaeology is partly disturbed.

=== Modifications and dates ===
Developments on the site have occurred as follows:

- 1789 – Powder magazine
- 1791 – Battery 1791
- 1801 – Battery improvements
- 1819 – Greenway constructions
- 1856 – Battery improvements
- 1904 – Military function ceases
- 1924–32 – Bridge works
- 1930–40's – Tree planting and park creation
- 1955 – Archaeological excavation
- 2000 – Partial reconstruction and interpretive park 2000

=== Further information ===
The Dawes Point Battery remains have been excavated, conserved and interpreted and these works have won several prestigious awards since 2001. These awards are:

- 2001 – Energy Australia National Trust Heritage Awards for Tourism
- 2002 – RAPI Award for Masterplan, Signage and Interpretation
- 2002 – RAIA (NSW) Lloyd Rees Award for Outstanding Urban Design
- 2002 – RAIA (NSW) Award for Architecture, Conservation and Reuse
- 2002 – Institute of Engineers Awards Highly Commended Heritage

"Tara" Interpretation has won:

- 2005 – Energy Australia National Trust Heritage Award for Interpretation and Presentation

== Heritage listing ==
As at 30 March 2011, the Dawes Point Battery remains and site are of State heritage significance for their historical and scientific cultural values. The site and building are also of State heritage significance for their contribution to The Rocks area which is of State Heritage significance in its own right.

The post 1788 archaeological remains at Dawes Point revealed to date are extremely important for their research potential. Such archaeological sites from the 18th century are exceedingly rare with the remains of First Government House and parts of the Dockyard on the western side of the Cove being some of the few examples bearing witness to the first 10 years of white settlement at Sydney Cove.

Only a handful of the colonial architect Francis Greenway's structures survive. With the excavation of the semi-circular battery an interesting part of his work has been rediscovered. Likewise, Greenway's quarry on the site is the only example of the careful mining of stone from this period in Sydney. The archaeology of the Battery floor and underground magazines also reveals elements constructed under the direction of George Barney, one of Australia's most important Colonial Engineers in the mid 19th century, such as the 1850s gun emplacements. Together with the presence of the cannon from this time, on their original timber block supports the Battery is an important archive of military history. The archaeological remains also have a strong aesthetic appeal as evocative ruins of Australia's colonial past.

Dawes Point is important for its cultural values to several identifiable groups within NSW society including present and former residents of The Rocks and Millers Point; people involved in the fight to save the Rocks in the 1970s; descendants of the many artillerymen and their families who were stationed at Dawes Point; and Bridge construction and maintenance workers, their families and descendants. Dawes Point, as a setting for the Harbour Bridge, is valued for its aesthetic and engineering significance by several identifiable groups including the Institution of Engineers (Australia) and the Royal Australian Institute of Architects

The 1789 Foundation Stone (now with the Mitchell Collection in the NSW State Library) and the five 1850s cannon contribute strongly to the heritage significance of the Place, in addition to being significant in their own right.

Dawes Point maintains vestiges of all periods of its occupation. The Point has been terraced and filled with each successive land use. All of these land uses have been closely linked with the site's unique position, occupying as it does a prominent headland with vistas up and down the harbour. Dawes Point Park still encompasses more than 90% of the area set aside for military purposes in the 18th century. Very little of this area has been alienated from public use, allowing the potential for interpretation of this period of the site's history in particular. The layers of history at Dawes Point have great potential to be used as a rich educational, cultural and tourism resource.

The excavation, conservation and interpretation of the Dawes Point Battery remains has won several prestigious awards since 2001, indicating the historical, social, technical and research significance the place holds, not only for the public, but also for professional bodies.

Dawes Point Battery remains was listed on the New South Wales State Heritage Register on 10 May 2002 having satisfied the following criteria.

The place is important in demonstrating the course, or pattern, of cultural or natural history in New South Wales.

The Battery was the first permanent fortification for the settlement and highlighted the tension between the British and other colonising European nations for dominion over the Pacific. Illustrates the construction of defence sites which are reasonably rare.

The place has a strong or special association with a person, or group of persons, of importance of cultural or natural history of New South Wales's history.

The Battery has connections with many prominent engineers and architects, particularly Dawes, Greenway, Barney, Hickson and Bradfield. Each of these men were directly responsible for a significant layer in the history of the Battery.

The place is important in demonstrating aesthetic characteristics and/or a high degree of creative or technical achievement in New South Wales.

Location on a prominent point of the harbour and set at the most northern part of the picturesque and historic The Rocks district. The Battery remains contribute to the open landscape of the Dawes Point Park which in turn showcases the magnificent landscaped setting for internationally recognised icons of Australia, the Harbour Bridge and the Opera House.

The place has a strong or special association with a particular community or cultural group in New South Wales for social, cultural or spiritual reasons.

Dawes Point is important for its cultural values to several identifiable groups within NSW society including present and former residents of The Rocks and Millers Point; people involved in the fight to save The Rocks in the 1970s; descendants of the many artillerymen and their families who were stationed at Dawes Point; and Bridge construction and maintenance workers, their families and descendants. Dawes Point, as a setting for the Harbour Bridge, is valued for its aesthetic and engineering significance by several identifiable groups including the Institution of Engineers (Australia), and the Royal Australian Institute of Architects. It listings on the registers of the National Trust and the National Estate demonstrate the esteem the site is held in by the wider community.

The excavation, conservation and interpretation of the Dawes Point Battery remains has won several prestigious awards since 2001, indicating the historical, social, technical and research significance the place holds, not only for the public, but also for professional bodies.

The place has potential to yield information that will contribute to an understanding of the cultural or natural history of New South Wales.

The post 1788 archaeological remains at Dawes Point revealed to date are extremely important for their research potential. Such archaeological sites from the 18th century are exceedingly rare with the remains of First Government House and parts of the Dockyard on the western side of the Cove being some of the few examples bearing witness to the first 10 years of white settlement at Sydney Cove.

Only a handful of the colonial architect Francis Greenway's structures survive. With the excavation of the semi-circular battery an interesting part of his work has been rediscovered. Likewise, Greenway's quarry on the site is the only example of the careful mining of stone from this period in Sydney. The archaeology of the Battery floor and underground magazines also reveals elements constructed under the direction of George Barney, one of Australia's most important Colonial Engineers in the mid 19th century, such as the 1850s gun emplacements. Together with the presence of the cannon from this time, the Battery is an important archive of military history. The archaeological remains also have a strong aesthetic appeal as evocative ruins of Australia's colonial past.

The 1789 Foundation Stone (now with the Mitchell Collection in the NSW State Library) and the five 1850s cannon contribute strongly to the heritage significance of the Place, in addition to being significant in their own right.

Dawes Point maintains vestiges of all periods of its occupation. The Point has been terraced and filled with each successive land use. All of these land uses have been closely linked with the site's unique position, occupying as it does a prominent headland with vistas up and down the harbour. Dawes Point Park still encompasses more than 90% of the area set aside for military purposes in the 18th century. Very little of this area has been alienated from public use, allowing the potential for interpretation of this period of the site's history in particular. The layers of history at Dawes Point have great potential to be used as a rich educational, cultural and tourism resource.

The place possesses uncommon, rare or endangered aspects of the cultural or natural history of New South Wales.

The Dawes Point Battery Remains is a rare historical precinct that contains evidence and associations of over 200 years of European occupation and as a contact site between the Eora and European cultures. It spans occupation and activity that includes scientific, defence, engineering and social values for the length of European occupation on the site. It is a magnificent landscaped setting for the Sydney Harbour Bridge and holds evidence of the Bridge's construction. It is the first defence installation set up in Australia and has rare surviving examples of subterranean powder magazines.

== See also ==
- Military history of Australia

== Gallery ==
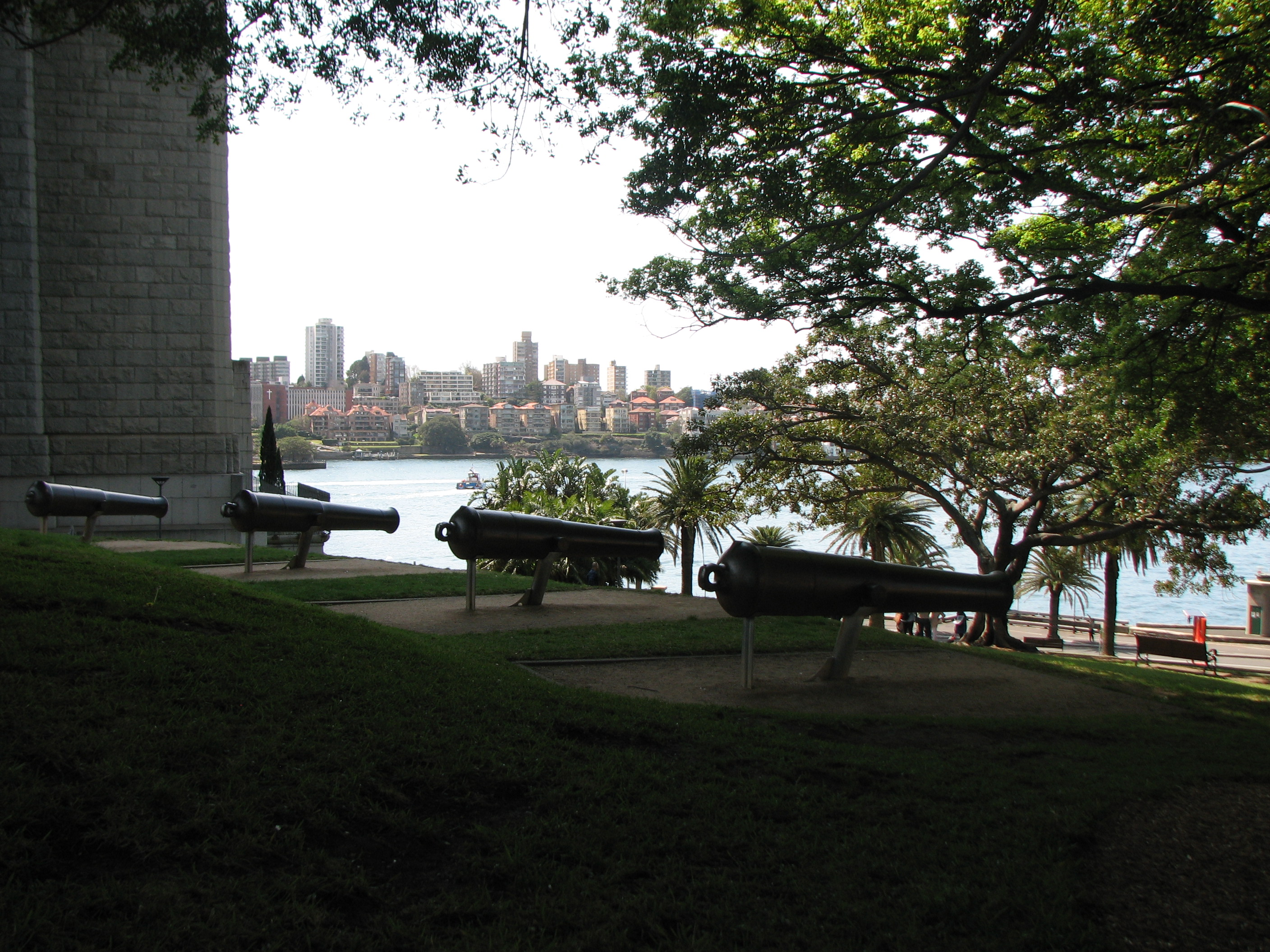
Cannons at the Dawes Point "Tarra" interpretive park

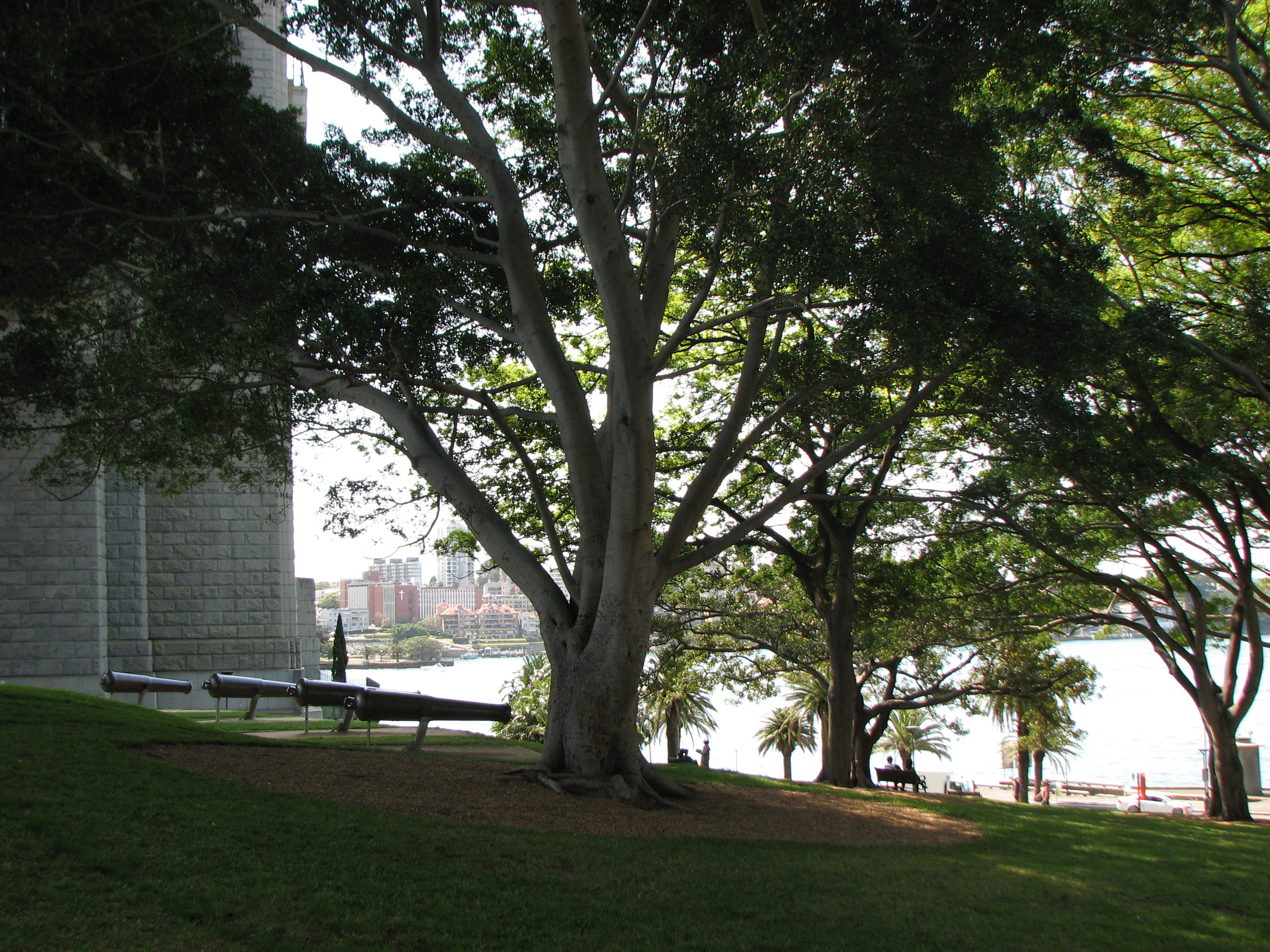
Cannons at the Dawes Point "Tarra" interpretive park

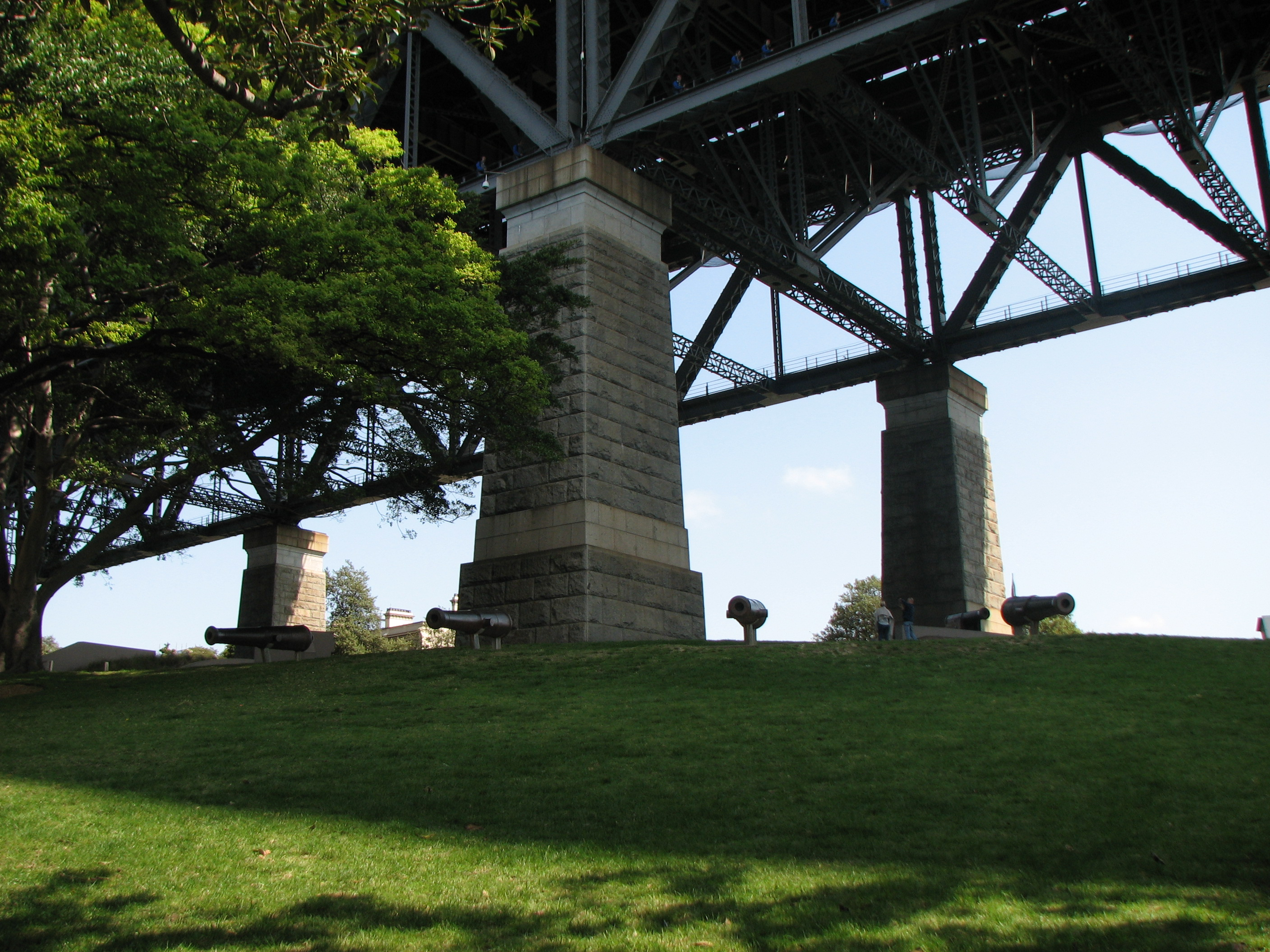
Cannons at the Dawes Point "Tarra" interpretive park

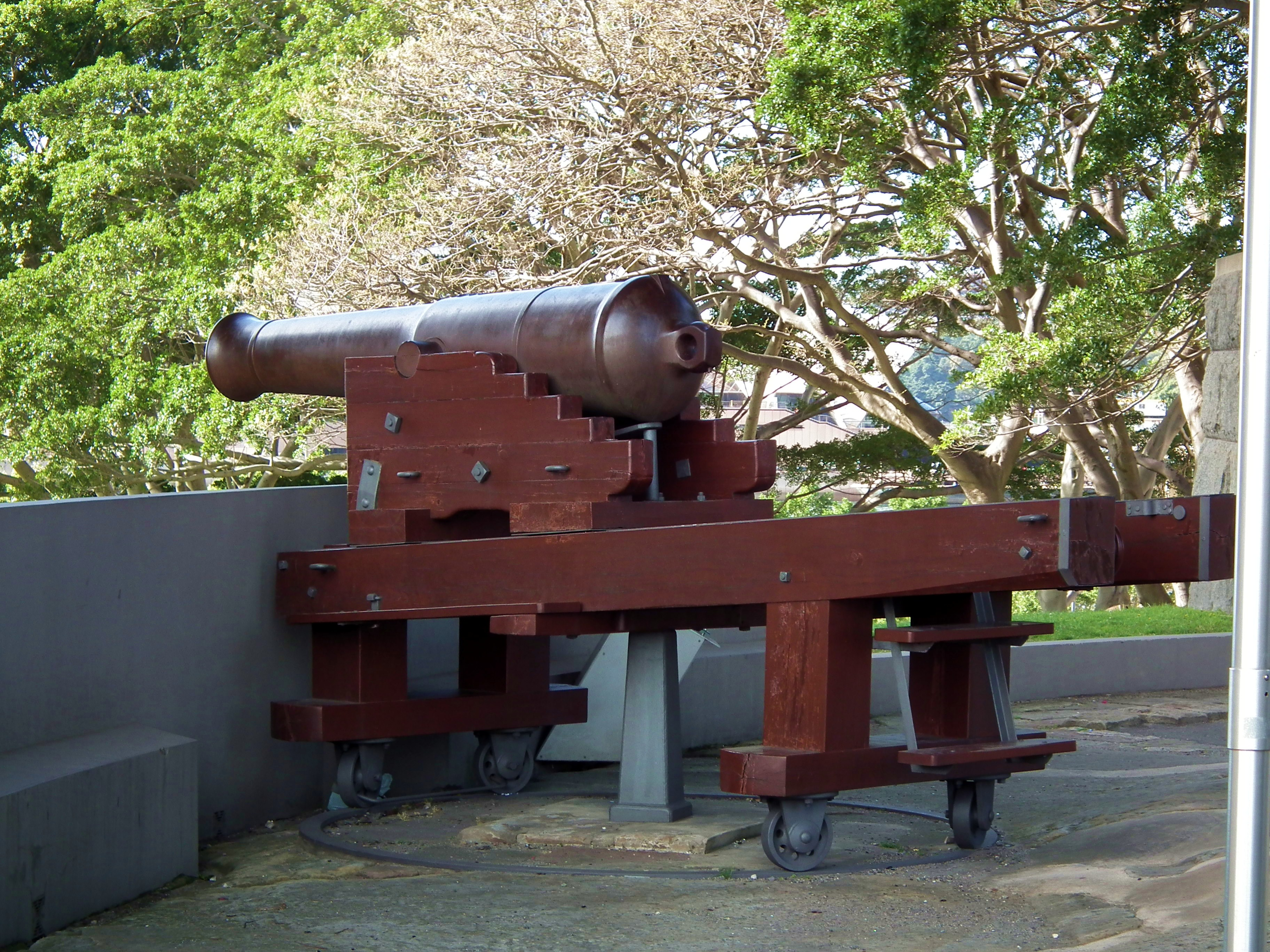
Point "Tarra" interpretive park
