= Artace (Mysia) =

Ancient city on the Propontis, Turkey

Coordinates: 40°24′11″N 27°47′47″E

Artace or Artake (Ancient Greek: Ἀρτάκη) was a town of ancient Mysia, near Cyzicus. It was a Milesian colony. It was a seaport, and on the same peninsula on which Cyzicus stood, and about 40 stadia from it. in Greek mythology, Artace is mentioned as the place where the argonauts changed the stone anchor of the Argo for a larger one. Artace was burnt, together with Proconnesus, during the Ionian Revolt, in the reign of Darius I. Probably it was not rebuilt for quite some time, for Strabo in the 1st century does not mention it among the Mysian towns: but he speaks of a wooded mountain of the name, with an island of the same name near to it, the same which Pliny the Elder calls Artacaeum. Timosthenes, quoted by Stephanus of Byzantium, also gives the name Artace or Artake to a mountain, and to a small island, one stadium from the land. In the time of Procopius (6th century), Artace had been rebuilt, and was a suburb of Cyzicus.

It was a member of the Delian League since it appears in tribute records of Athens between 454/3 and 418/7 BCE.

Its site is located near Erdek, Asiatic Turkey.
