= Argo (2006 ship) =

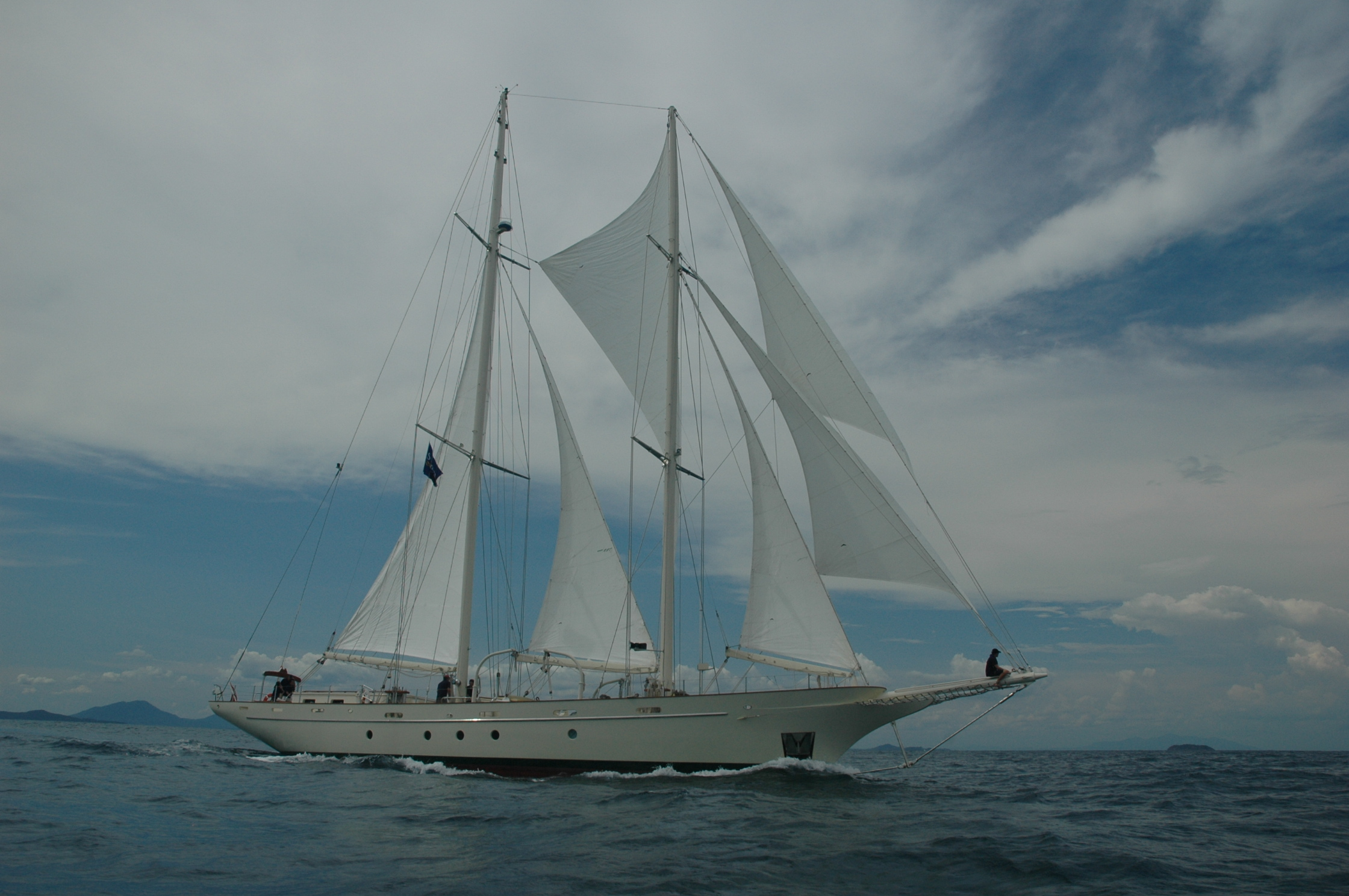
- Argo under full sail in Gulf of Thailand near Ko Samet

British Virgin Islands
- Name: Argo
- Operator: Seamester
- Port of registry: Road Harbour, British Virgin Islands
- Builder: Marsun Shipyards
- Launched: 2006
- Identification: Call sign: ZJL7509; MMSI number: 378111136
- Status: Active

General characteristics
- Displacement: 148 tonnes (146 long tons)
- Length: 112 ft (34 m)
- Beam: 25 ft (8 m)
- Draught: 10.1 ft (3 m)
- Propulsion: Sail and 1 × Caterpillar 425 hp (317 kW) diesel engine
- Sail plan: Staysail Schooner
- Capacity: 7 Professional Crew and 26 Student Trainee Crew

SY Argo is a two-masted Marconi-rigged schooner. She is owned and operated by Seamester Study Abroad Programs as one of three sail training vessels the company operates. Argo is certified and inspected by the British Maritime and Coastguard Agency as a Category “0” vessel, allowing her unrestricted operation in the world's oceans. She is registered in Road Town, Tortola, British Virgin Islands.

== History ==
SY Argo was designed by Bill Langan as an inspiration of the schooner Black Douglas (now rechristened El Boughaz I). The motivation and backing for the project came from the success experienced by Seamester's smaller schooner Ocean Star. She was completed in June 2006 in Samut Prakan, Thailand at Marsun Shipyards.

Argo is a two-masted staysail schooner that measures 112 feet (34 m) overall and accommodates twenty six students and seven professional crew on ocean voyages. Sailing under the Seamester flag, Argo circumnavigates on 90-day college semester-based programs and shorter 21-day and 60-day programs during the northern hemisphere summer.

Argo completed her first circumnavigation back to Thailand in December 2008 and was due to start her second when the piracy off of the coast of Somalia and Yemen prevented safe passage through the Gulf of Aden. Argo continues to circumnavigate with students aboard, taking the southerly route to Cape Town via Christmas Island and Mauritius.

== Specifications ==
Principal equipment

- Main engine: Caterpillar 3126, 425 hp (317 kW)
- Generators: 2 × Northern Lights 25 kW
- Hydraulic System: TRAC American Bow Thruster
- Dive Compressor: Bauer Mariner 8.4 cubic feet (0.24 m^{3}) per min
- Air Conditioning: Marine Airr
- Water Maker: Sea R.O. 1,200 US gallons (4.5 m^{3}) per day
- Refrigeration: Seafrost BG 1000
- Windlass: 2 × Maxwell VWC 8000
- Tenders: 2 × Avon SR4.0m, 50 hp (37 kW) and 30 hp (22 kW)
- Communications: Iridium Phone/Data Service, Cellular Phone, SSB, VHF

Vessel characteristics

- Designer: Bill Langan
- Builder: Marsun Shipyards
- Length Overall (Sparred): 112 ft (34 m)
- Length Overall (Unsparred): 101 ft (31 m)
- Length On Deck: 94 ft (29 m)
- Beam: 25 ft (7.6 m)
- Draft: 10.1 ft (3.1 m)
- Displacement: 148 Tons
- Height of Main Mast: 103 ft (31 m)
- Sail Area: 4,700 sq ft (440 m^{2}).
- Hull Material: Steel

== See also ==
- List of large sailing yachts
- List of schooners
