= Ocean Star (schooner) =

Sea Vessel

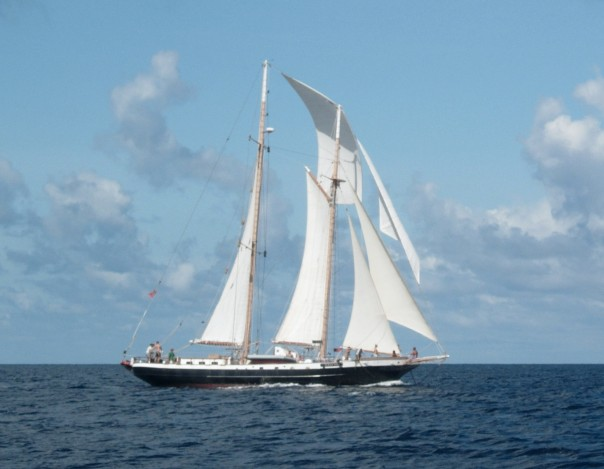
- Ocean Star in the Caribbean Sea

British Virgin Islands
- Name: Ocean Star
- Operator: Seamester
- Port of registry: Road Harbour, British Virgin Islands
- Builder: Howdy Bailey Marine Metals, Inc.
- Launched: 1991
- Identification: Call sign: ZJL6107; MMSI number: 378111171
- Status: Active

General characteristics
- Tonnage: 70 tonnes (69 long tons)
- Length: 88 ft (27 m)
- Beam: 19 ft (6 m)
- Draught: 9 ft (3 m)
- Propulsion: Sail and 1x Caterpillar 210 hp (160 kW) diesel engine
- Sail plan: Schooner; Marconi-rigged mainsail, gaff rigged foresail
- Capacity: 4 Professional Crew and 16 Student Trainee Crew

Ocean Star is a two-masted schooner which conducts educational programs for Seamester Global Programs in the Caribbean Sea. The vessel is 88 feet (27 m) in overall length and accommodates sixteen trainees and four professional staff. Ocean Star is certified and inspected by the British Maritime and Coastguard Agency for ocean service. Ocean Star undergoes an annual refit in Antigua at Antigua Slipways Ltd.

== History ==
Ocean Star was launched in 1991 as a school ship for Ocean Navigator Magazine. Over the years, she sailed the waters between Canada and the Caribbean, enabling students to learn navigation and nautical skills. She originally operated in the New England and Canadian waters during summer, and the Caribbean Sea and Gulf of Mexico in winter, making frequent stops in Bermuda during her transits north and south. During her time with Ocean Navigator Magazine, she carried six adult students and was crewed by a licensed captain and mate, a navigation instructor, two deckhands, and a cook.

After an extensive refit in 1999, Ocean Star began training students and young adults on solely Caribbean waters. In 1999, she was bought by Sea|mester to host their college sail and scuba training programs. With Sea|mester, Ocean Star sails from her home port in Road Harbour, Tortola as far south as Grenada, with stops in Saint Vincent and the Grenadines, Saint Kitts, Martinique, Nevis, Saba, Sint Eustatius, Antigua, Dominica, Guadeloupe, Saint Lucia, and Saint Barthelemy.

The programs run on Ocean Star inspired the eventual creation of Argo, a 112-foot (34 m) schooner built in Thailand in 2006, which circumnavigates the globe with students.

== Specifications ==
Principal Equipment

- Main Engine: Caterpillar 3208 (210 hp)
- Generator: Westerbeke 15 kW
- Dive Compressor: Bauer Mariner 8.4 CFM
- Air Conditioning: Marine Airr
- Water Maker: Sea R.O. 800 gallons per day
- Refrigeration: 2 x Seafrost BG 1000
- Anchor handling: Galley Maid HW-40
- Tenders: 2 x Avon SR4.0m (50 hp and 30 hp)
- Communication: Iridium Phone/Data Service, cellular phone, SSB, VHF

Vessel Characteristics

- Designer: Murray G. Peterson Associates
- Builder: Howdy Bailey Marine Metals
- Length Overall: 88 ft.
- Beam: 18.6 ft.
- Draft: 9 ft.
- Displacement: 75 Tons
- Height of Main Mast: 95 ft.
- Sail Area: 4400 Sq. ft.
- Hull Material: Steel
