= Italian ship Argo =

Argo was the name of at least three ships of the Italian Navy and may refer to:

- Italian submarine Argo (1912), a Medusa-class submarine launched in 1912 and discarded in 1918.
- Italian submarine Argo (1936), an Argo-class submarine launched in 1936 and scuttled in 1943.
- Italian ship Argo (MEN209), a presidential yacht launched in 1971
