= Argo (1800 ship) =

History

United States
- Name: Argo
- Owner: Robert Berry
- Fate: Wrecked January 1800

General characteristics
- Type: Schooner
- Propulsion: Sail

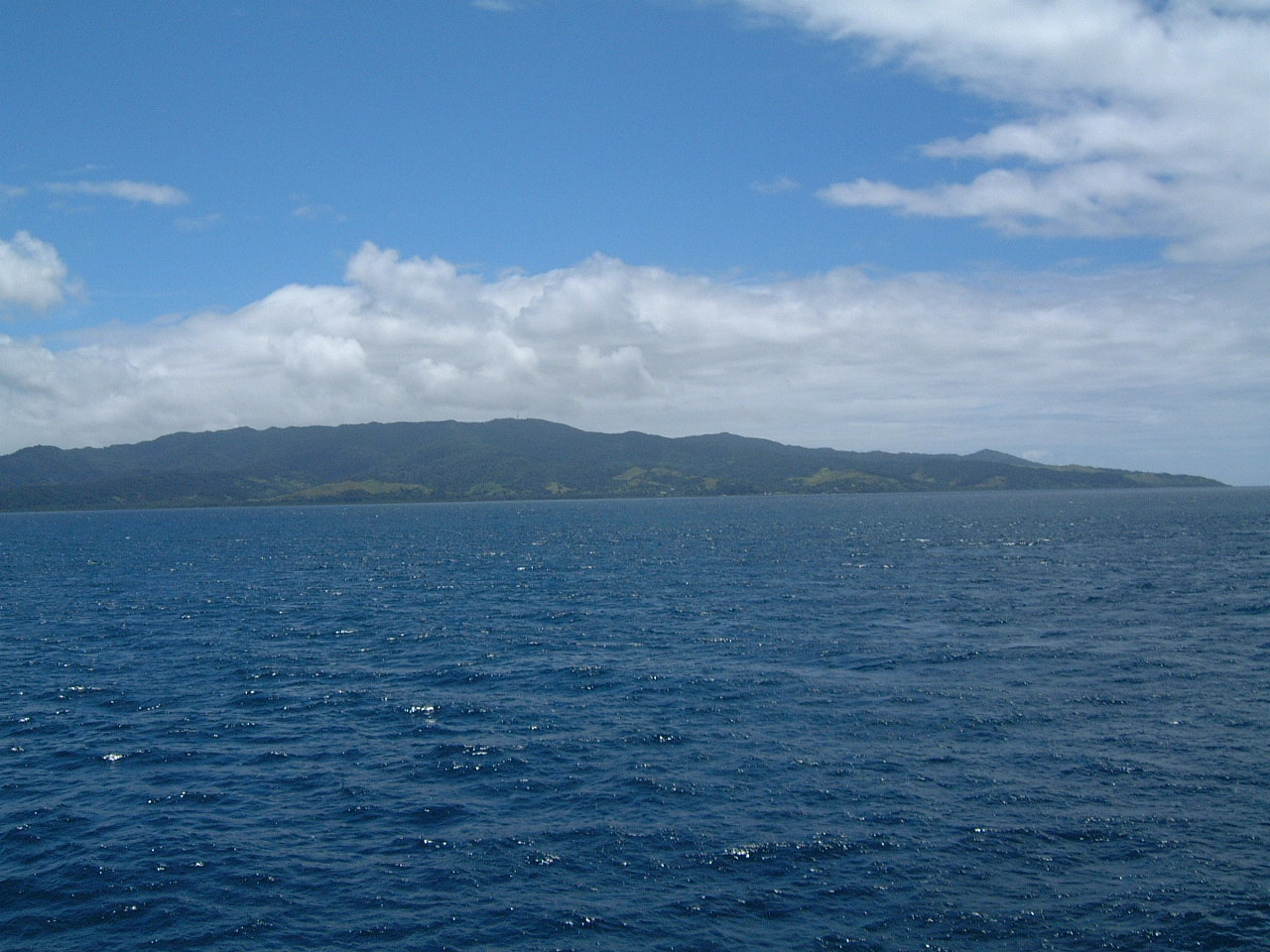
Island of Vanua Levu

Argo was an American schooner that was wrecked in Fiji during January 1800. Her owner was Robert Berry.

Argo's sailing career was not a smooth one. A contemporary account of her 1798 arrival in Port Jackson (Sydney, Australia) said:

The Argo, an American schooner, arrived from the Isle of France, having on board a cargo of salt provisions, French brandy, and other articles on speculation; which, as usual in this country, found a ready sale, much more to the advantage of the owners than the colonists. As this ship came from the Mauritius, the Governor entertained some jealousy, certainly founded on probability; and, as it was not any ways impossible, that, under neutral colours, a spy might be concealed, he thought it requisite to put the battery on Point Maskelyne, into a more secure state, and to construct two redoubts in proper and convenient situations for offensive and defensive warfare, should it prove requisite.

In January 1800, Argo was on her way from China to Sydney when she was wrecked on what thereafter was known as Argo Reef, southeast of Fiji. Her crew reached Tongatapu where all but two were killed by natives. In 1802, the two survivors were rescued.

An alternative account of the capture of the crew, told from the point of view of the natives in Fiji, gives the date as 1802 or 1803, and says that the name of the reef prior to the shipwreck was Bukakatanoa.

One of the survivors of the wreck, Oliver Slater, spent the two years after the wreck on Vanua Levu, which has also been called "Sandalwood Island". This sailor is credited with spreading the news, upon his arrival in China, that led to the development of the sandalwood trade in Vanua Levu, near Bua Bay.
