= Seamester =

Study abroad program focused on sail training and marine science

Sea|mester
- Company type: Private
- Industry: Study Abroad Program
- Founded: 1998
- Founder: Mike Meighan
- Headquarters: 1075 Central Ave Sarasota, Florida, United States
- Area served: Worldwide
- Key people: Mike Meighan CEO & Travis Yates COO
- Parent: Global Expeditions Group
- Website: https://www.seamester.com/

Seamester (also known by the trade name Sea | mester) is part of the Global Expeditions Group, an organization that offers academic, study abroad programs on board three sailing vessels, Ocean Star, Argo and Vela. Sea|mester began running programs in 1998 as an extension from its sister organization ActionQuest. A full semester's course load is offered on board including classes in Oceanography, Marine Biology, Professional Skipper Certification Training, Leadership, Basic Seamanship, and an Independent Research Project. Courses are accredited through the University of South Florida (USF).

== Mission ==
Sea|mester is an institution dedicated to the facilitation and development of practical watermanship skills and defining of academic interests in ocean and earth science, while offering college credit and promoting personal growth, teamwork and leadership through a distinctive, experiential educational program based upon active participation and individual support.

== History ==
Sea|mester ran its first program in 1998 aboard two Beneteau monohulls. In 1999, Sea|mester acquired the schooner Ocean Star and began running 80-day programs with high school graduates and college students.

Ocean Star sails throughout the Caribbean, from Tortola to Grenada. Occasionally, Ocean Star sails with another monohull or catamaran, allowing berths for over 25 students.

The steady growth of Sea|mester with Ocean Star allowed for the expansion of its fleet with the design and construction of the schooner S/Y Argo. Argo was built in Samut Prakan, Thailand and completed in June 2006. Since then, Argo has been making her way around the globe with students. She had completed her first circumnavigation of the globe in December 2008 and was hoping to start her second during the spring of 2009. Unfortunately, the vessel was unable to secure an escort from the US Navy or EU coalition through the pirate-infested waters of the Gulf of Aden and had to head back to Asia to wait out the Monsoon season in order to sail south to Cape Town. Argo has completed her second circumnavigation via Cape Town.

== Vessels ==
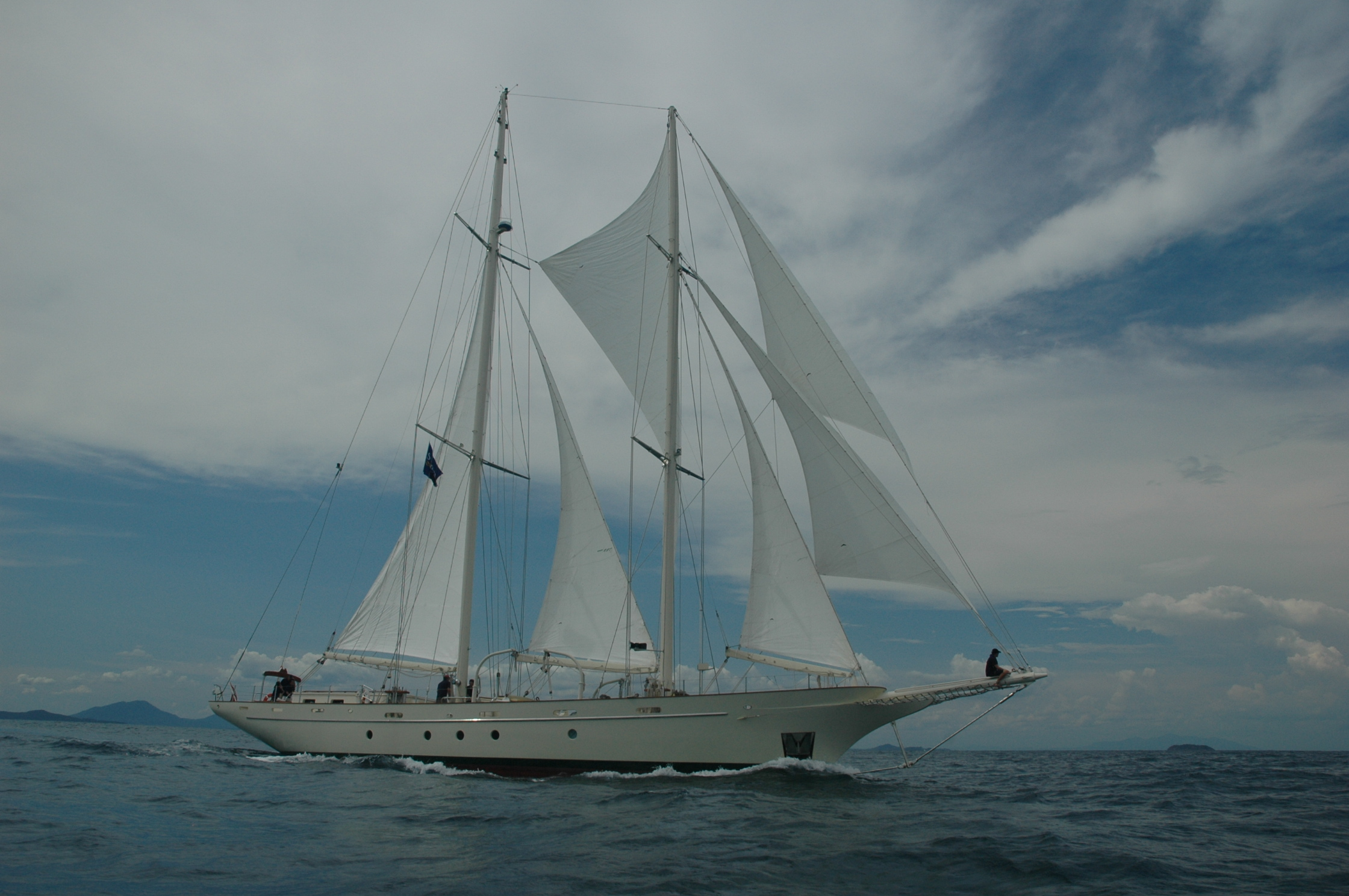
S/Y Argo sailing out of Thailand 2006

=== S/Y Argo ===
S/Y Argo is a two-masted Marconi rigged schooner designed to cross oceans with up to 26 students on board and 7 professional staff. Argo is certified and inspected by the British Maritime and Coastguard Agency as a Category “0” vessel, allowing her unrestricted operation in the world's oceans. She is registered in Road Town, Tortola, British Virgin Islands, and has been circumnavigating the globe with students since her launch in 2006. She is currently a member vessel of the Tall Ships America Organization. The name of the vessel was inspired by the constellation Argo Navis.

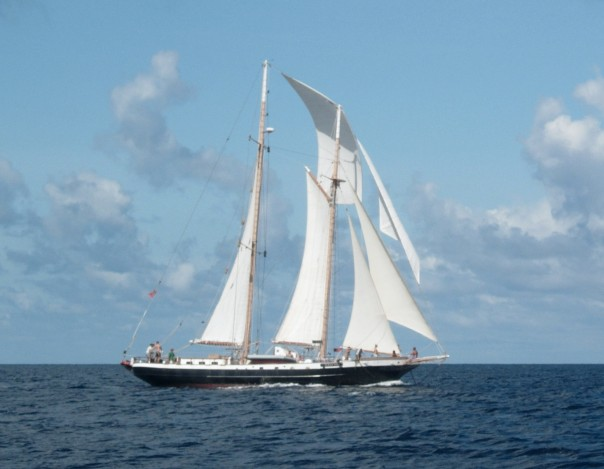
S/Y Ocean Star with every sail available to her raised

=== S/Y Ocean Star ===
S/Y Ocean Star is a two-masted schooner originally built for Ocean Navigator Magazine as a sail training and promotional vessel. Ocean Star now conducts educational programs for Sea|mester Global Programs in the Caribbean Sea, and is a member vessel of the Tall Ships America Organization. The vessel is 88 feet (27 m) in overall length and accommodates sixteen trainees and four professional staff. Ocean Star is certified and inspected by the British Maritime and Coastguard Agency for ocean service. Ocean Star undergoes an annual refit in English Harbour, Antigua at Antigua Slipway Ltd.

=== S/Y Vela ===
S/Y Vela launched in July 2020 and is a duplicate of S/Y Argo that had previously been commissioned by Seamester.

== Awards ==
Sea Education Program of the Year Award from Tall Ships America 2011
