= Black Douglas (schooner) =

Patrol vessel of the United States Navy

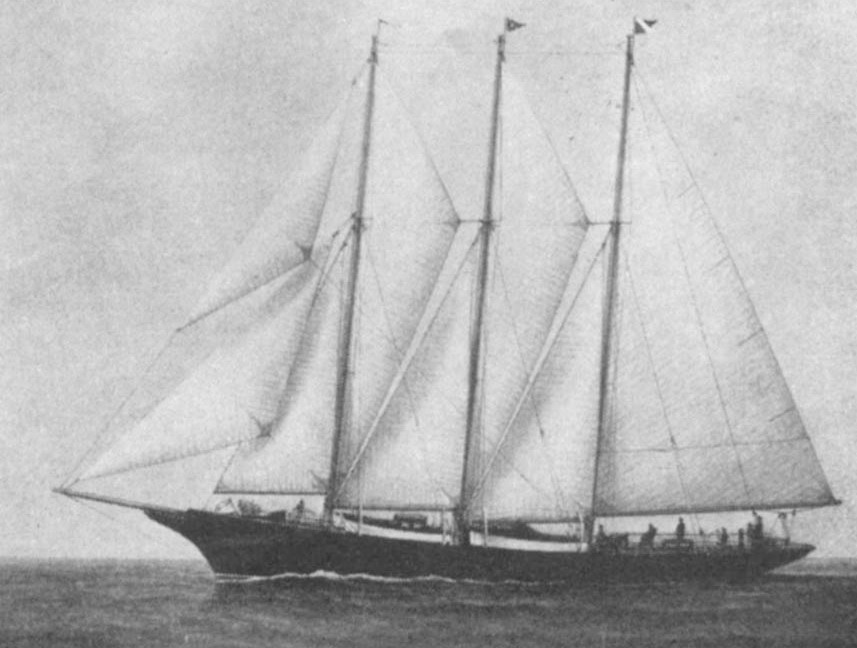

History

Morocco
- Name: El Boughaz I
- Owner: King Mohammed VI of Morocco
- Launched: 9 June 1930
- Identification: IMO number: 6915946; MMSI number: 242890000; Callsign: CNBF
- Status: In active service

General characteristics
- Class & type: Schooner
- Displacement: 371 tons
- Length: 133 ft (41 m)
- Beam: 32 ft (9.8 m)
- Draft: 12 ft (3.7 m)
- Installed power: Twin 290 hp (220 kW) Volvo Pentas
- Speed: 9.5 knots (17.6 km/h; 10.9 mph)

Black Douglas (later teQuest, Aquarius, Aquarius W; now El Boughaz I) is a three-masted staysail auxiliary schooner built for Robert C. Roebling (great-grandson of John A. Roebling and grand-nephew of Washington Roebling) at the Bath Iron Works of Bath, Maine, and launched on 9 June 1930. Designed by renowned New York City naval architects H.J. Gielow & Co., she is one of the largest steel-hulled schooners ever built.

The ship undertook a variety of functions during her first three and a half decades: private yacht for the Roebling family, patrol vessel in United States Navy service during World War II (as a "patrol yacht – coastal"; PYc-45), and research vessel for the United States Fish and Wildlife Service plying the Pacific from Alaska to Baja California.

She was bought at auction by Louis Black of Santa Monica, California, to be used as a treasure hunter in the Caribbean. Black sailed the ship through the Panama Canal and then spent eight years treasure hunting in the Turks and Caicos. He eventually sold the ship to Capt. George Stoll, who turned her into a second Flint School school ship. The school closed in 1981 and she was sold, and in 1982–1983 was reconditioned at the Abeking & Rasmussen shipyard in Lemwerder, Germany, serving as a template for the first generation of super yachts. She is currently owned by King Mohammed VI of Morocco.

She was launched with a 325-hp Cooper-Bessemer marine diesel engine, later replaced by a 600-hp (@600 RPM) model from San Francisco's Enterprise Engine & Foundry Company. She now is equipped with twin 290-hp Volvo Pentas. She has flown the flags of the United States, Panama, the Cayman Islands, the United Kingdom, and Morocco (current).

== In print ==
- "As smooth...under power as sail"; Cooper-Bessemer advertisement w/ photo (Yachting, May 1930).
- "'Black Douglas' Runs into Trouble" (Savannah Morning News, [1942]).
- Cradle of Ships (New York: G.P. Putnam's Sons, 1958).
- ""Quite normal pupils"...nur ganz billig ist für sie die schwimmende Schule nicht" (Kieler Chronik, 4 October 1974).
- "Jovens americanos gostaram de ver brasileiro sempre sorrindo" (A Província do Pará, 15 April 1975).
- "Bermuda Gets an Early Taste of Tall Ship Fever" (Royal Gazette, 27 May 1976).
- Cover photo (The Bermudian, August 1976).
- "Eine komplette höhere Schule kam unter Schonersegeln nach Lübeck" (Lübecker Nachrichten, 28 October 1977).
- Probing the Oceans 1936–1976 (San Diego: Tofua Press, 1978).
- Les Antilles aujourd'hui (Paris: Éditions JA, 1979).
- Adventures of a Zoologist (New York: Charles Scribner's Sons, 1980).
- Beken of Cowes: A Century of Tall Ships (London: Harrap, 1985).
- Bath Iron Works: The First Hundred Years (Portland: Anthoensen Press, 1987).
- "Alternate Destination: Cádiz" (SAIL, October 1987).
- The First 25 Years (Washington: U.S. Department of Commerce [Southwest Fisheries Center, La. Jolla, Calif.], 1989).
- "Aquarius, a Yacht to Treasure" (Financial Times, 30 & 31 December 1989).
- Painting (for October 2000) in the Professional Yachtsman’s Calendar (Bungay, Suffolk: Colin Squire Publishing, 1999).
- S/Y Aquarius sales brochure (Ft. Lauderdale: Fraser Yachts Worldwide, 2002).
- Chapman's Great Sailing Ships of the World (New York: Hearst, 2005).
- "Ban bèk – Barku di bella" (Èxtra Boneiru [Bonaire, Neth. Antilles], 8 August 2006).
- "Top 200 – Die größten Segelyachten" (Boote supplement, Sept./Oct. 2007).

== See also ==
- List of schooners
- List of large sailing yachts up to 1995
