= Road Harbour =

Seaport in British Virgin Islands

Coordinates: 18°26′N 64°37′W

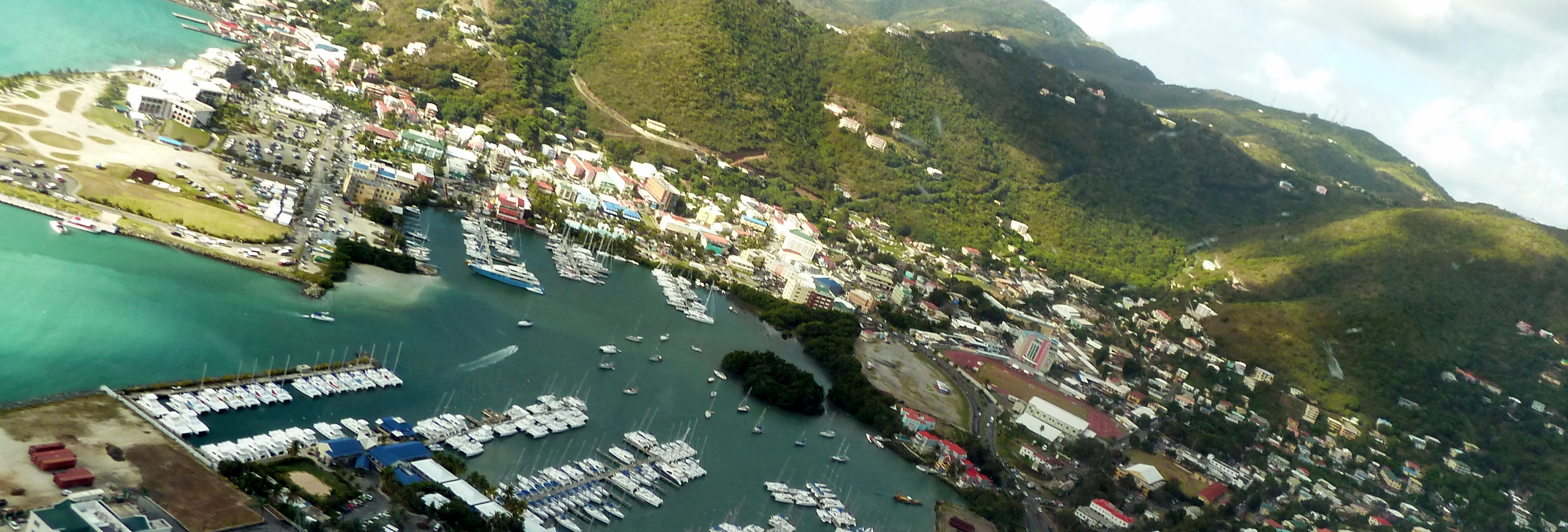
- Interactive map of Road Harbour

Road Harbour, located in Road Town, Tortola, is the commercial seaport of the British Virgin Islands. There are a number of smaller marinas around the harbour, such as the Road Reef Marina and the Fort Burt Marina, an overnight small boat anchorage, customs and immigration offices. Inter island ferries stop at the ferry dock on the NW edge of Road Harbour next to Customs. Road Harbour is deep and large enough to handle many of the cruise ships that make Tortola a port of call.

Entrance by sea to Road Harbour is straightforward, although many boats continue to run aground on the sand bar on the Road Reef/Fort Burt side of the harbour at the entrance.
