= Flint School =

The Flint School was a preparatory school founded by educators George and Betty Stoll. Based in Sarasota, Florida, United States, it operated aboard its first, then second, school ships from 1969 to 1981. Girls as well as boys aged 12 to 18 sailed the world aboard the steel-hulled auxiliary schooners Te Vega (ex-Etak, ex-Vega, ex–USS Juniata, now Deva), and teQuest (ex–Black Douglas, ex-Aquarius, ex–Aquarius W, now El Boughaz I) while studying an academic curriculum. The school was one of the very few educational institutions of any kind during the period to stress free-market or libertarian thought, making it in some ways akin to Hillsdale College. In its pedagogy, the Flint School combined elements from Alan Villiers' earlier seaborne program with Maria Montessori's Casa dei Bambini.

Although the school was not based on Objectivist philosophy, the Stolls made Ayn Rand's Atlas Shrugged the centrepiece of their program. The Stolls also included the work of Nathaniel Branden even though he had been expelled from Rand's movement some years earlier. Similarly, the Stolls emphasised the importance of the Austrian School of economics, despite Rand's having characterised Friedrich Hayek as "an example of our most pernicious enemy." The Stolls' academic program attempted to reconcile libertarianism and Objectivism.

George Stoll was regarded as an able teacher with good insights into human nature, especially relating to adolescence. He described his school as a benign dictatorship, a management style wholly appropriate to life at sea. Many students and staff members were drawn to him by dint of his personality, and he sustained his legitimacy on the basis of charismatic authority. Others thought that, as the years progressed, Capt. Stoll had allowed a small-scale personality cult to flourish around him. This was ironic because George Stoll stressed that human beings should always submit their actions and beliefs to the test of reason.

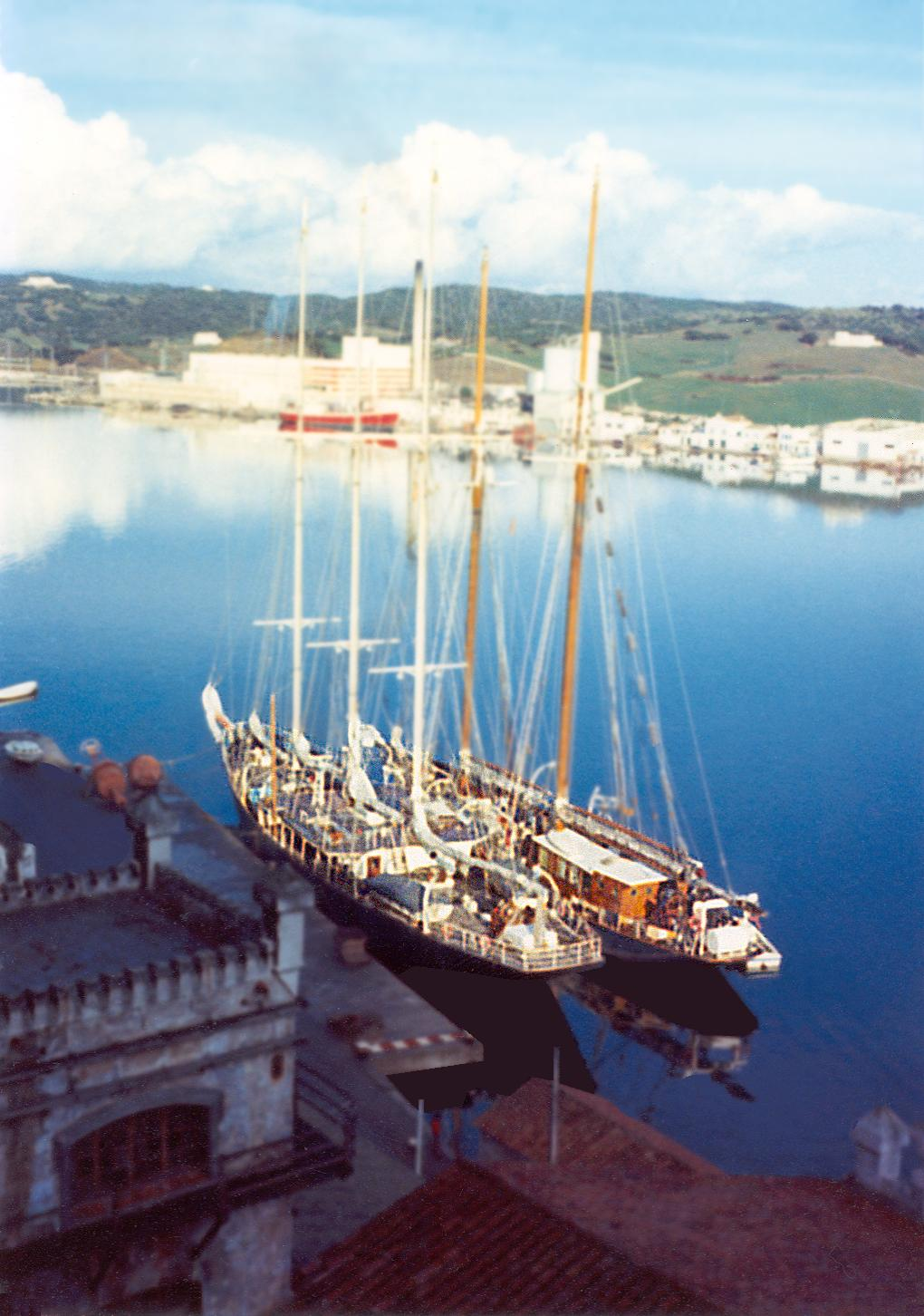
Quayside, Mahón, Menorca, March 1979.

The school's sailing program was run by the directors' son, Jim. An accomplished yachtsman, Jim Stoll spent the latter 1960s participating in many blue-water races, crewing aboard famed racing yachts Panacea, Ondine, and Kialoa. He was also a protégé of master mariner Irving Johnson, and it is unlikely the Flint School would have been sited aboard two tall ships without that connection. Sailing provided the students with a hands-on education not only in the nautical arts, but also in mathematics (navigation) and physics (engine room). The students were not in a sail training program as meant for sea cadets contemplating a career with one of the world's navies or merchant fleets. But some of them did manage to attain the requisite skills to crew Te Vega in the Cutty Sark Tall Ships' Races in 1972 (Helsinki–Falsterbo stage) and 1976 (Bermuda–Newport, Rhode Island, stage). All students participated in daily ship maintenance and periodic heavy maintenance when the vessels were in dry dock.

Though chartered and controlled by an American school, the ships flew a Panamanian flag of convenience. In 1976, Te Vega sailed into New York Harbor to take part in Operation Sail, timed to coincide with the United States Bicentennial celebrations; this was one of the rare occasions when either ship called at a United States port. (Te Vega joined many of the world's tall ships for the Parade of Sail to commemorate the event, and the Secretary of the Navy and the Commandant of the Coast Guard jointly awarded her third prize in her class in the "Smartest Ship" competition.) The ships were instead based abroad, with favorite adopted home ports being Copenhagen, Amsterdam, Pointe-à-Pitre, and La Condamine and Fontvieille, Monaco. Additionally, the ships frequented some of the world's most exclusive marinas and anchorages, among them Puerto José Banús, Porto Cervo, Portofino, Villefranche-sur-Mer, and the Gustavia roadstead in Saint Barthélemy.

Flint School students bore witness to history. They visited Jamaica, Guyana, and Dominica during times of great social strife in those places, and in the West Indies generally. They witnessed the United Kingdom's Winter of Discontent and Spain's Tejerazo. The schooners were dockside in Travemünde, Kiel, and Hamburg for much of the Deutscher Herbst, and in many Italian locales during the Anni di piombo.

Sailing offered an opportunity to visit nearly all the major coastal and insular destinations in Europe and the Caribbean Basin, many of which were poorly served by air or otherwise very remote. Among the more unusual places the ships visited were Devil's Island, Paramaribo, Bonifacio, St. Peter Port, Rønne, Heraklion, Portoferraio, Valletta, Macapá, Îles des Saintes, Gibraltar, Curaçao, Dakar, Cape Verde, Agadir, and Ponta Delgada. Students reached Europe's major cultural attractions by train and bus on a ten-day continental tour in the spring.

The Flint School's travels also provided the directors with a way to show how people put ideas and values into practice. A visit to the Normandy invasion beaches taught that the price of freedom is sometimes paid in blood. A visit to the East German border at the Priwall Peninsula gave a glimpse of what a society can look like when freedom is usurped. But perhaps the most pointed examples were visits – on the same day – to the Deutsches Museum and the Dachau concentration camp. They are a mere 20 kilometres apart.
